= Quang Trung, Cao Bằng =

Commune in Cao Bằng province, Vietnam

Quang Trung
- Commune
- Interactive map of Quang Trung
- Country: Vietnam
- Region: Northern Midland and Mountainous
- Province: Cao Bằng
- Established: June 16, 2025

Government
  - Type: Commune
  - Body: People's Council of Quang Trung commune

Area
  - Total: 82.60 km^{2} (31.89 sq mi)

Population (2025)
  - Total: 5,975
  - Density: 72.34/km^{2} (187.4/sq mi)
- Time zone: UTC+07:00

Quang Trung is a commune in Cao Bằng province, Vietnam. It is one of 56 communes and wards in the province.

== Geography ==
Quang Trung is a commune in Cao Bằng province, Vietnam. Located 25km southwest of Thục Phán ward. It borders with China to the north; Trà Lĩnh commune to the west; Quảng Uyên and Đoài Dương commune to the south; Trùng Khánh commune to the east.

== History ==
Prior to 2020, Quang Trung commune was part of Trà Lĩnh district in Cao Bằng province.

On March 1, 2020, most of Trà Lĩnh district was merged into Trung Khanh district, while Quốc Toản commune (today part of Trà Lĩnh commune) merged with Quảng Uyên and Phục Hòa districts to form Quảng Hòa district. Quang Trung commune belongs to Trùng Khánh district.

On June 16, 2025, Standing Committee of the National Assembly of Vietnam issued Resolution No. 1657/NQ-UBTVQH15 on the reorganization of commune-level administrative units in Cao Bằng province. Quang Trung commune was established by merging the entire area and population of Tri Phương, Quang Trung, and Xuân Nội communes (formerly part of Trùng Khánh district).
