= Nguyễn Huệ (commune) =

Commune in Cao Bằng province, Vietnam

- Commune
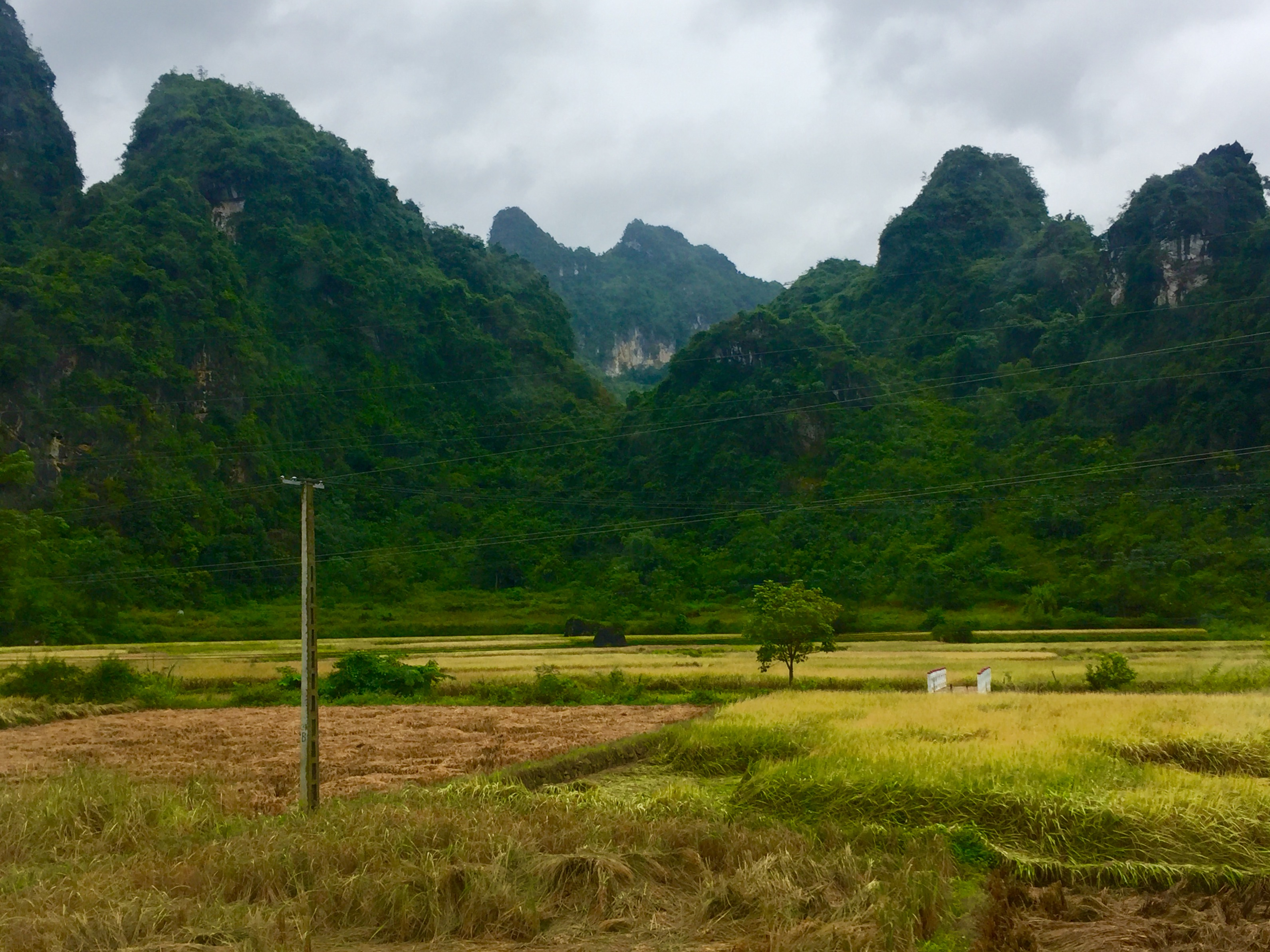
- A rural view
- Interactive map of Nguyễn Huệ
- Coordinates: 22°41′53″N 106°18′02″E
- Country: Vietnam
- Region: Northern Midland and Mountainous
- Province: Cao Bằng
- Established: June 16, 2025

Government
  - Type: Commune
  - Body: People's Council of Nguyễn Huệ commune

Area
  - Total: 146.80 km^{2} (56.68 sq mi)

Population (2025)
  - Total: 9,349
  - Density: 63.69/km^{2} (164.9/sq mi)
- Time zone: UTC+07:00

Nguyễn Huệ is a commune in Cao Bằng province, Vietnam. It is one of 56 communes and wards in the province.

== Geography ==
Nguyễn Huệ is a commune in Cao Bằng province, Vietnam. It is located 10km south of Thục Phán ward. It borders with Tân Giang and Nùng Trí Cao wards to the west, Hòa An and Quang Hán communes to the north, Trà Lĩnh and Hạnh Phúc commune to the east, Kim Đồng commune to the south.

== History ==
On June 16, 2025, the Standing Committee of the National Assembly of Vietnam issued Resolution No. 1657/NQ-UBTVQH15 on the reorganization of commune-level administrative units in Cao Bằng province. Nguyễn Huệ commune was established by merging the entire area and population of Quang Trung, Ngũ Lão, and Nguyễn Huệ communes (formerly part of Hòa An district).
