= Bảo Lâm =

Bảo Lâm may refer to several places in Vietnam, including.

- Bảo Lâm commune, Cao Bằng province.
- Bảo Lâm 1 commune, Lâm Đồng province
- Bảo Lâm 2 commune, Lâm Đồng province
- Bảo Lâm 3 commune, Lâm Đồng province
- Bảo Lâm 4 commune, Lâm Đồng province
- Bảo Lâm 5 commune, Lâm Đồng province
- Former Bảo Lâm district of Cao Bằng province.
- Former Bảo Lâm district of Lâm Đồng province.
