= Nùng Trí Cao (ward) =

Ward in Cao Bằng province, Vietnam

- Ward
- October 3rd street in Nùng Trí Cao ward

- Seal
- Country: Vietnam
- Region: Northern Midland and Mountainous
- Province: Cao Bằng
- Established: June 16, 2025

Government
  - Type: Ward
  - Body: People's Council of Nùng Trí Cao ward

Area
  - Total: 29.31 km^{2} (11.32 sq mi)

Population (2025)
  - Total: 19,507
  - Density: 665.5/km^{2} (1,724/sq mi)
- Time zone: UTC+07:00

Nùng Trí Cao is a ward in Cao Bằng province, Vietnam. It is one of 56 wards and communes in the province.

== Etymology ==
The ward is named after Nùng Trí Cao (Nong Zhigao), a leader of the Tày, Nùng, and Zhuang ethnic groups who led an uprising between the Song dynasty and Đại Cồ Việt during the Lý dynasty.

== Geography ==
Nùng Trí Cao is a ward in Cao Bằng province, Vietnam. It is located 190km north of Hanoi. It borders with Nguyễn Huệ commune to the north and east, Tân Giang ward to the south, Thục Phán ward to the southwest, Hòa An commune to the northwest.

== History ==
In the past, Cao Bằng was home to various ethnic minority tribes. During the Lý dynasty, the court repeatedly dispatched troops to conquer tribes and established châu, but still allowed local leaders to rule. Although the tribal leaders in this area submitted to the government, they occasionally rebelled and established independent kingdoms, most notably the Kingdom of Dali of Nùng Trí Cao.

During the Lê dynasty, emperor Lê Thánh Tông unified the administrative units throughout the country. Cao Bằng became a phủ of thừa tuyên Thái Nguyên. In 1499, emperor Lê Hiến Tông separated phủ Cao Bằng from Thái Nguyên to form a separate trấn named Cao Bằng.

However, according to scholar Đào Duy Anh, Cao Bằng only truly separated from Thái Nguyên to become a trấn (provincial-level administrative unit) after the Mạc dynasty was overthrown. It wasn't until after the fall of Thăng Long in 1592 that most of the remaining forces of the Mạc dynasty fled to Cao Bằng to establish a separate government against the Lê-Trịnh dynasty, a practice that lasted until 1677. After defeating the Mạc dynasty, lord Trịnh ordered the construction of the Mục Mã citadel (now located in Thục Phán ward) to serve as the administrative center for governing the Cao Bằng. During the Nguyễn dynasty, the Mục Mã citadel was renovated and renamed the capital of Cao Bằng province.

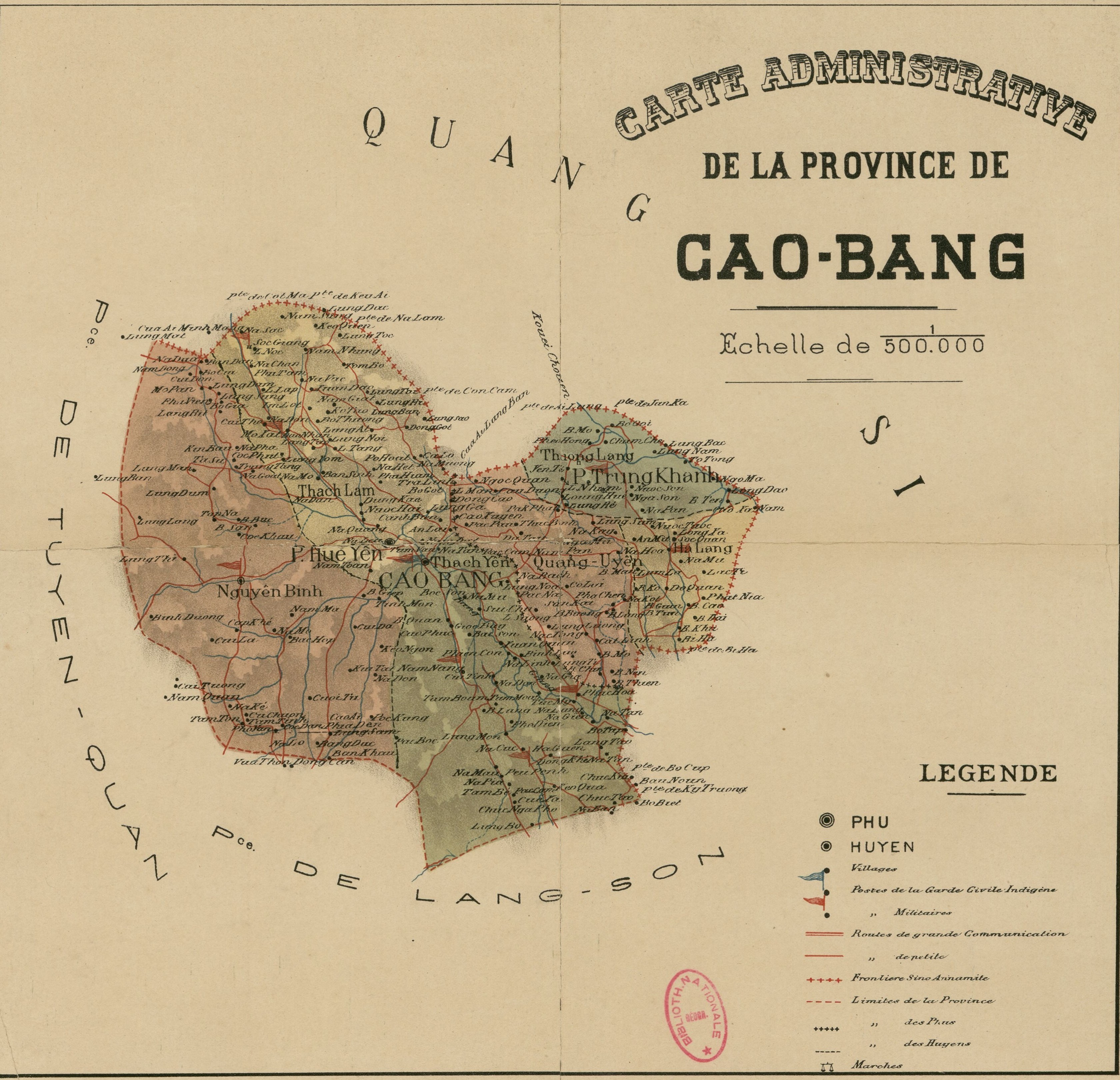
Cao Bằng province map in 1891

In October 1886, French colonial empire occupied Cao Bằng. Throughout the French colonial period, the Cao Bằng was frequently under military administration, directly governed by French officers. The area of present-day Nùng Trí Cao ward is located in the vicinity of and under the jurisdiction of the Cao Bằng sub-district commander, and administratively belongs to phủ Hòa An.

Nevertheless, due to the characteristics of the border region, Vietnamese revolutionaries often established bases here to develop forces for the independence movement. In particular, from 1941 to 1945, Cao Bằng was the main base of the Viet Minh organization, and the area of what is now Nùng Trí Cao ward was where the Cao Bằng Party Committee of the Indochinese Communist Party established its base preparing for the August Revolution. On August 15, 1945, the Japanese army officially surrendered unconditionally to the Allies. On the morning of August 21, 1945, Cao Bằng was also taken over by the Viet Minh forces.

In late 1946, the French colonial empire opened fire and re-invaded Indochina. The French suffered a defeat in the Battle of Route Coloniale 4, and the Viet Minh liberated Cao Bằng in 1950.

From then until 2025, the Nùng Trí Cao ward area will be part of Cao Bằng provincial city.

On June 16, 2025, the Standing Committee of the National Assembly of Vietnam issued Resolution No. 1657/NQ-UBTVQH15 on the reorganization of commune-level administrative units in Cao Bang province. Nùng Trí Cao ward was established by merging the entire area and population of Ngọc Xuân ward, Sông Bằng ward, and Vĩnh Quang commune (formerly part of Cao Bằng provincial city).
