= Tân Giang =

Ward in Cao Bằng province, Vietnam

- Ward
- A view of Tân Giang ward
- Interactive map of Tân Giang
- Coordinates: 22°37′N 106°16′E
- Country: Vietnam
- Region: Northern Midland and Mountainous
- Province: Cao Bằng
- Established: June 16, 2025

Government
  - Type: Ward
  - Body: People's Council of Tân Giang ward

Area
  - Total: 84.26 km^{2} (32.53 sq mi)

Population (2025)
  - Total: 18,204
  - Density: 216.0/km^{2} (559.6/sq mi)
- Time zone: UTC+07:00

Tân Giang is a ward in Cao Bằng province, Vietnam. It is one of 56 wards and communes in the province after the reorganisation in 2025.

== Geography ==
Tân Giang is a ward in Cao Bằng province, Vietnam. Located 180 km north of Hanoi and 28 km south of the border with China. It borders with Canh Tân and Kim Đồng commune to the south, Bạch Đằng commune to the west, Thục Phán and Nùng Trí Cao wards to the north, Nguyễn Huệ commune to the northeast and east.

== History ==
On June 16, 2025, the Standing Committee of the National Assembly of Vietnam issued Resolution No. 1657/NQ-UBTVQH15 on the reorganization of commune-level administrative units in Cao Bằng province. Tân Giang ward was established by merging the entire area and population of Duyệt Trung, Hòa Chung, Tân Giang wards, Chu Trinh commune (formerly part of Cao Bằng provincial city) and Lê Chung commune (formerly part of Hòa An district).
