= Bảo Lạc district =

Coordinates: 22.917°N 105.667°E

Bảo Lạc District Huyện Bảo Lạc
- District
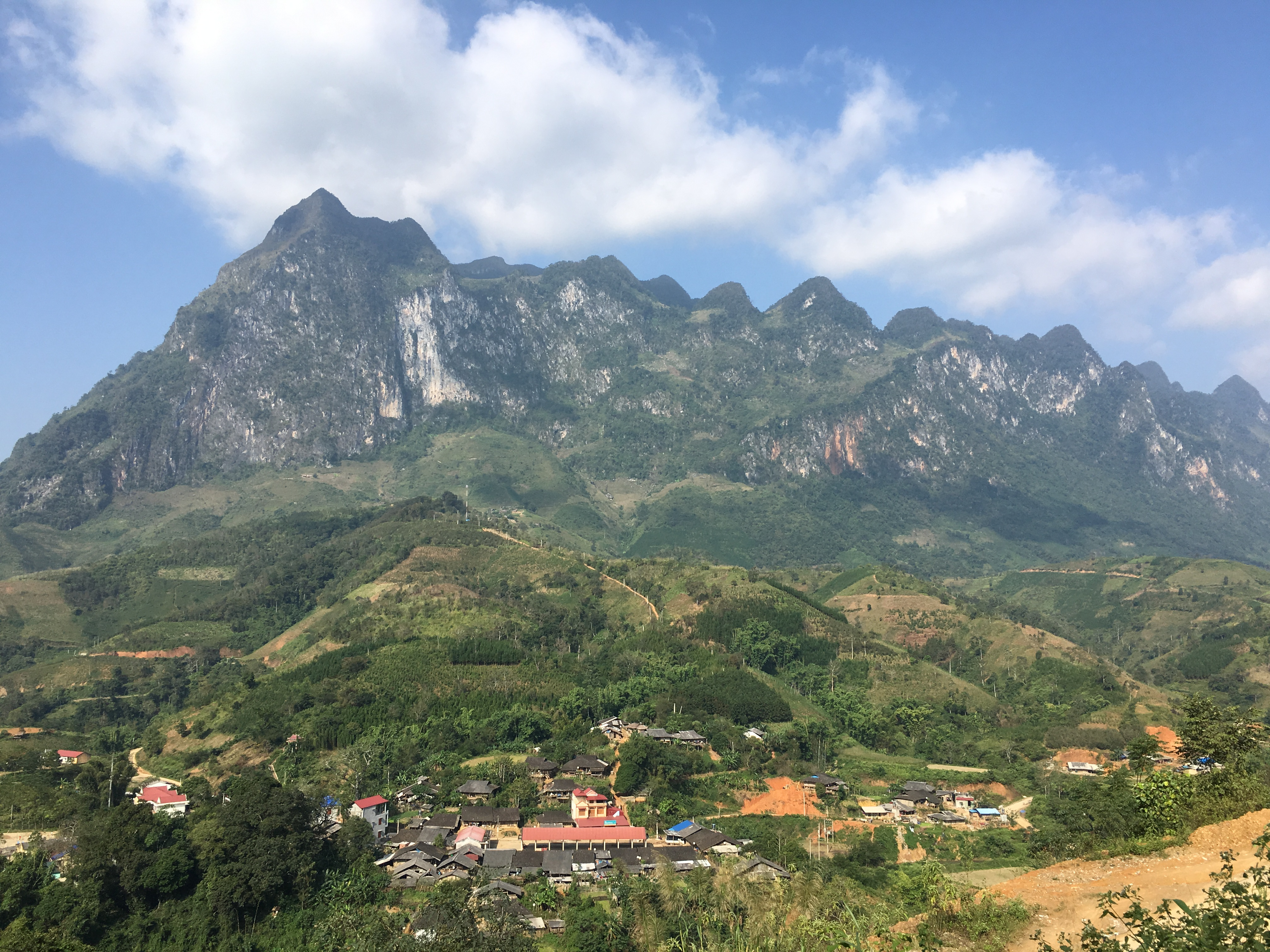
- Cốc Pàng village in Bảo Lạc district

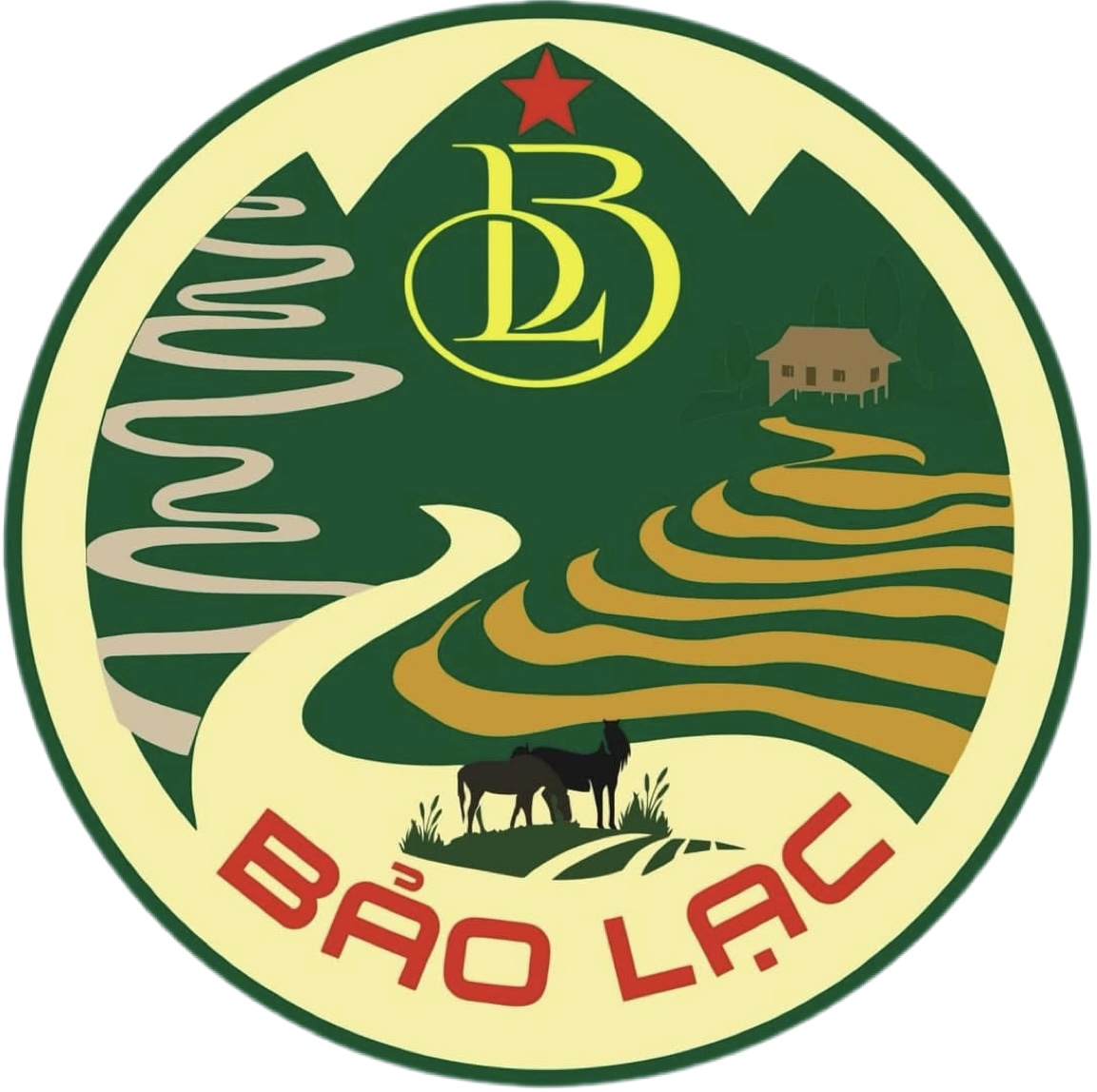
- Seal
- Interactive map of Bảo Lạc District
- Country: Vietnam
- Region: Northeast
- Province: Cao Bằng
- Capital: Bảo Lạc

Area
  - Total: 355 sq mi (919 km^{2})

Population (2019)
  - Total: 54,420
  - Density: 153/sq mi (59.2/km^{2})
- Time zone: UTC+7 (Indochina Time)

Bảo Lạc is a former rural district of Cao Bằng province in the Northeast region of Vietnam. As of 2019 the district had a population of 54,420. The district covers an area of 919 km^{2}. The district capital lies at Bảo Lạc.

== Administrative divisions ==
Bảo Lạc District consists of the district capital, Bảo Lạc, and 16 communes: Sơn Lộ, Đình Phùng, Hưng Đạo, Huy Giáp, Hồng An, Xuân Trường, Khánh Xuân, Phan Thanh, Hồng Trị, Cô Ba, Bảo Toàn, Cốc Pàng, Thượng Hà, Hưng Thịnh, Sơn Lập and Kim Cúc.

== Climate ==
Climate data for Bảo Lạc, elevation 258 m (846 ft)
Month	Jan	Feb	Mar	Apr	May	Jun	Jul	Aug	Sep	Oct	Nov	Dec	Year
Record high °C (°F)	32.2 (90.0)	36.0 (96.8)	37.5 (99.5)	40.8 (105.4)	41.7 (107.1)	40.5 (104.9)	39.8 (103.6)	39.5 (103.1)	38.5 (101.3)	37.0 (98.6)	34.5 (94.1)	32.5 (90.5)	41.7 (107.1)
Mean daily maximum °C (°F)	19.9 (67.8)	21.9 (71.4)	25.8 (78.4)	30.0 (86.0)	32.6 (90.7)	33.2 (91.8)	33.5 (92.3)	33.3 (91.9)	32.1 (89.8)	28.9 (84.0)	25.3 (77.5)	21.7 (71.1)	28.2 (82.8)
Daily mean °C (°F)	14.7 (58.5)	16.7 (62.1)	20.4 (68.7)	24.2 (75.6)	26.6 (79.9)	27.6 (81.7)	27.7 (81.9)	27.2 (81.0)	25.7 (78.3)	22.9 (73.2)	19.1 (66.4)	15.6 (60.1)	22.4 (72.3)
Mean daily minimum °C (°F)	11.9 (53.4)	13.6 (56.5)	16.8 (62.2)	20.4 (68.7)	22.8 (73.0)	24.2 (75.6)	24.5 (76.1)	24.0 (75.2)	22.4 (72.3)	19.7 (67.5)	15.9 (60.6)	12.3 (54.1)	19.0 (66.2)
Record low °C (°F)	−0.1 (31.8)	3.5 (38.3)	4.4 (39.9)	9.3 (48.7)	13.6 (56.5)	16.3 (61.3)	18.5 (65.3)	18.5 (65.3)	13.6 (56.5)	8.6 (47.5)	4.6 (40.3)	−0.1 (31.8)	−0.1 (31.8)
Average precipitation mm (inches)	24.9 (0.98)	23.3 (0.92)	45.2 (1.78)	72.7 (2.86)	158.6 (6.24)	215.5 (8.48)	238.9 (9.41)	210.2 (8.28)	104.1 (4.10)	72.6 (2.86)	42.2 (1.66)	24.4 (0.96)	1,232.6 (48.53)
Average rainy days	4.9	4.5	5.2	8.3	13.1	16.6	18.1	17.1	10.6	9.0	6.4	4.0	117.8
Average relative humidity (%)	81.5	78.9	76.4	76.3	77.9	82.5	84.3	85.2	84.2	84.3	83.8	82.5	81.4
Mean monthly sunshine hours	67.7	86.8	84.7	131.4	173.9	144.0	158.1	161.2	149.9	120.5	107.5	90.3	1,477
Source: Vietnam Institute for Building Science and Technology
