= Thục Phán (ward) =

Ward and capital of Cao Bằng province, Vietnam

- Ward
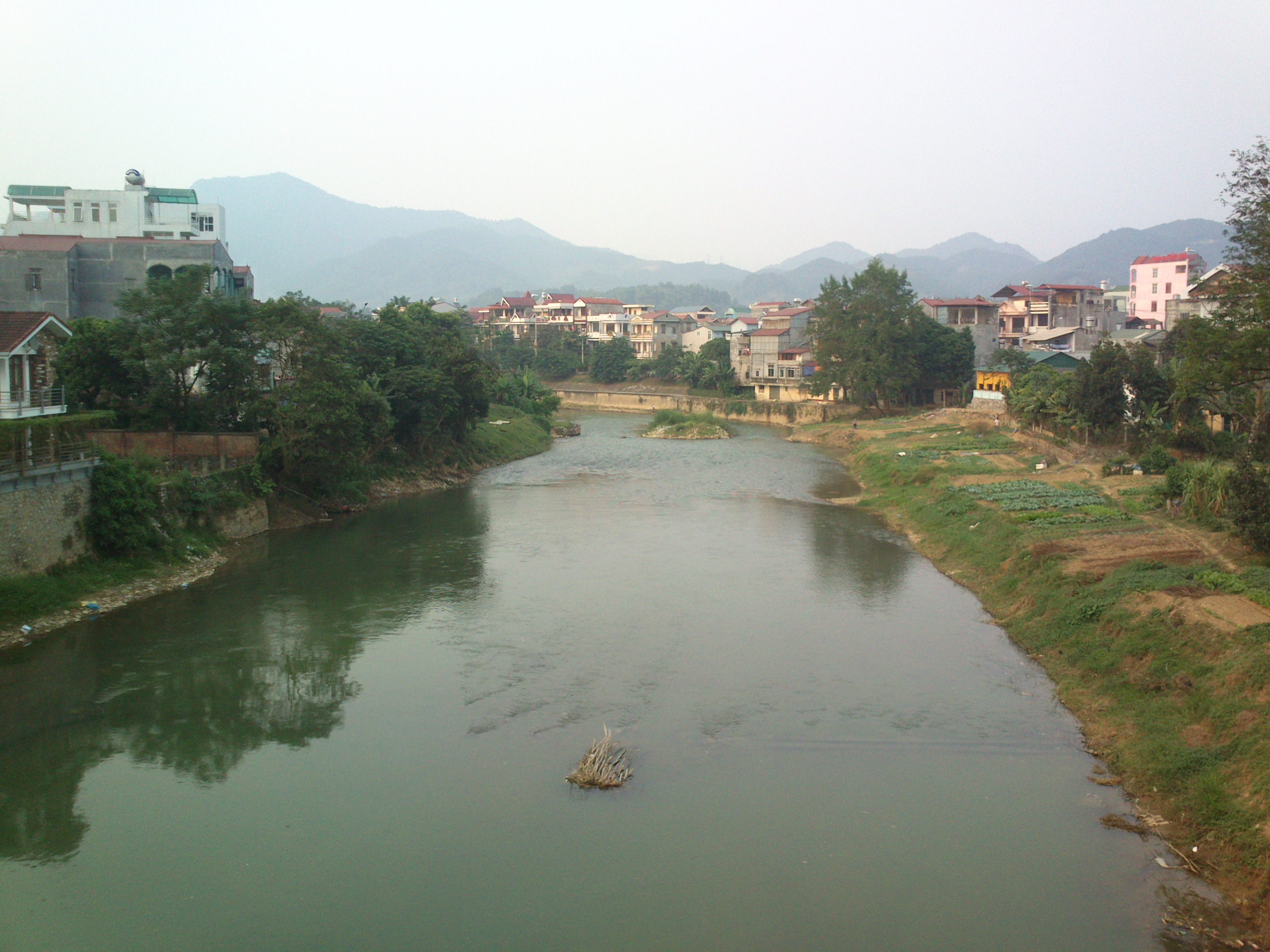
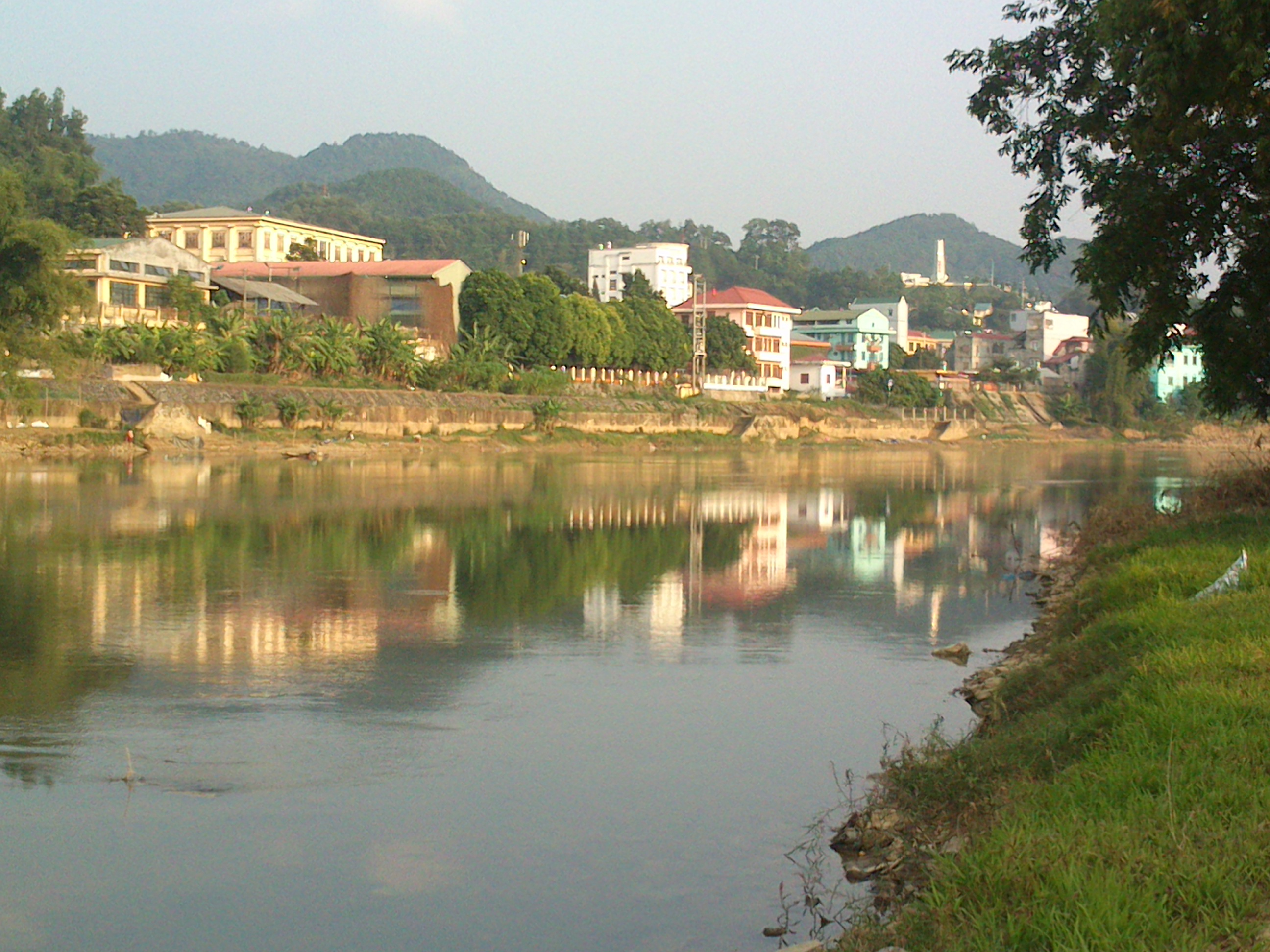
- Country: Vietnam
- Region: Northern Midland and Mountainous
- Province: Cao Bằng
- Established: June 16, 2025

Government
  - Type: Ward
  - Body: People's Council of Thục Phán ward

Area
  - Total: 55.44 km^{2} (21.41 sq mi)

Population (2025)
  - Total: 41,157
  - Density: 742.4/km^{2} (1,923/sq mi)
- Time zone: UTC+07:00

Thục Phán is a ward in Cao Bằng province, Vietnam. It is one of 56 wards and communes in the province. This is the administrative center of Cao Bằng province after the reorganization in 2025.

== Geography ==
Thục Phán is a ward in Cao Bằng province, Vietnam and located 190 km north of Hanoi, 210 km northwest of Haiphong city, 765 km northwest of Da Nang city, 1320 km north of Ho Chi Minh City and 25 km southwest of the China–Vietnam border. It borders with Hòa An commune and Nùng Trí Cao ward to the north, Tân Giang ward to the east, Bạch Đằng commune to the south and Minh Tâm commune to the west.

== Administrative divisions ==
Thục Phán is divided into 32 neighborhoods: Bằng Giang, Cao Bình, Đà Quận, Đại Thắng, Đề Thám, Đồng Chúp, Đồng Tâm, Đức Hạnh, Hà Hoàng, Hạnh Phúc, Hiến Giang, Hoàng Như, Hoàng Tung, Hợp Giang, Kho Cuốn, Kim Đồng, Lê Lai, Mỹ Sơn, Nà Cáp, Na Lữ, Nặm Lìn, Nam Phong, Nước Giáp, Phan Thanh, Phố Cũ, Phố Thầu, Sông Hiến, Thanh Sơn, Thiên Văn, Trưng Nhị, Vườn Cam, Xuân Phách.

== History ==
Prior to 2025, the area of Thục Phán ward was formerly Sông Hiến, Đề Thám, Hợp Giang wards, Hưng Đạo commune in Cao Bằng provincial city and Hoàng Tung commune in Hòa An district, Cao Bằng province.

On June 12, 2025, the Standing Committee of the National Assembly of Vietnam issued Resolution No. 1657/NQ-UBTVQH15 on the reorganization of commune-level administrative units in Cao Bằng province. Thục Phán ward was established by merging the entire area and population of Sông Hiến, Đề Thám, Hợp Giang wards, Hưng Đạo commune (formerly part of Cao Bằng provincial city) and Hoàng Tung commune (formerly part of Hòa An district).
