= Quảng Hòa district =

Quảng Hòa District Huyện Quảng Hòa
- District
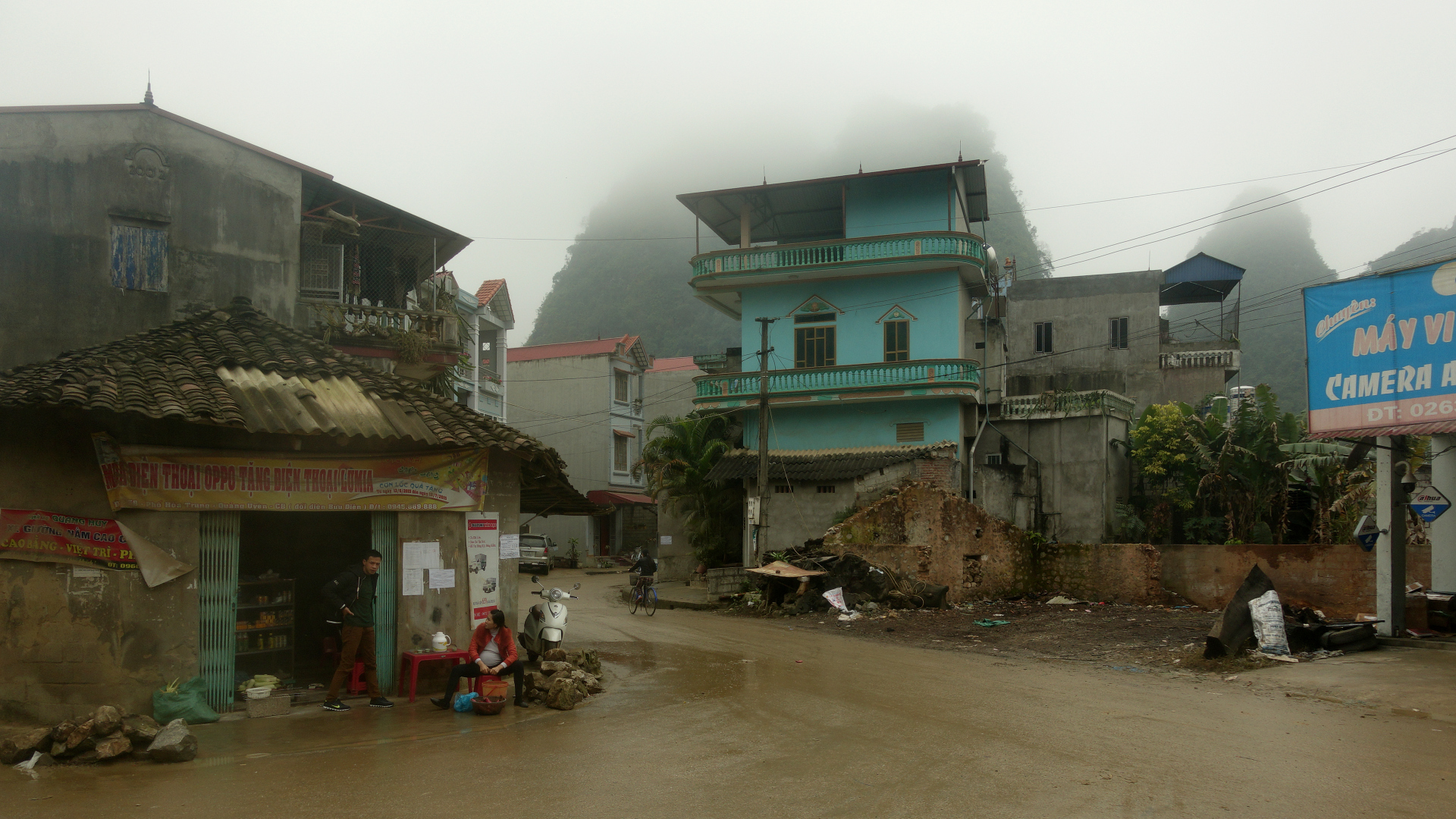

- Location within Vietnam
- Coordinates: 22.58333°N 106.5°E
- Country: Vietnam
- Region: Northeast
- Province: Cao Bằng
- Capital: Quảng Uyên

Area
  - Total: 258.28 sq mi (668.95 km^{2})

Population (2019)
  - Total: 66,620
  - Density: 260/sq mi (100/km^{2})
- Time zone: UTC+7 (Indochina Time)
- Website: quanghoa.caobang.gov.vn

Quảng Hòa is a former rural district of Cao Bằng province in the Northeast region of Vietnam. As of 2019 the district had a population of 66,620. The district covers an area of 668.95 km^{2}. The district capital lies at Quảng Uyên.

== Administrative divisions ==
Quảng Hòa district is subdivided to 19 commune-level subdivisions, including the townships of: Quảng Uyên (district capital), Hòa Thuận, Tà Lùng and the rural communes of: Bế Văn Đàn, Cai Bộ, Cách Linh, Chí Thảo, Đại Sơn, Độc Lập, Hạnh Phúc, Hồng Quang, Mỹ Hưng, Ngọc Động, Phi Hải, Phúc Sen, Quảng Hưng, Quốc Toản, Tiên Thành, Tự Do
