= Bình Long (disambiguation) =

Bình Long is a ward in Đồng Nai city, Vietnam.

Bình Long may also refer to several other places in Vietnam, including:

- Bình Long province, a former province in South Vietnam
- Bình Long (town), a former district-level town, dissolved in 2025 as part of the 2025 Vietnamese administrative reform
- Bình Long, Quảng Ngãi, formerly a commune of Bình Sơn District, now part of Bình Sơn, Quảng Ngãi
- Bình Long, An Giang, formerly a commune of Châu Phú District, now part of Châu Phú, An Giang
- Bình Long, Cao Bằng, formerly a commune of Hòa An District, now part of Hòa An, Cao Bằng
- Bình Long, Thái Nguyên, formerly a commune of Võ Nhai District, now part of Dân Tiến commune
