= Nguyên Bình =

Nguyên Bình Xã Nguyên Bình
- Commune
- Nguyên Bình commune
- Location within Vietnam
- Coordinates: 22°39′03″N 105°57′43″E
- Country: Vietnam
- Region: Northeast
- Province: Cao Bằng
- Time zone: UTC+7 (UTC + 7)

Nguyên Bình is a commune (xã) of Cao Bằng Province, Vietnam.
