= Hà Quảng =

- Commune
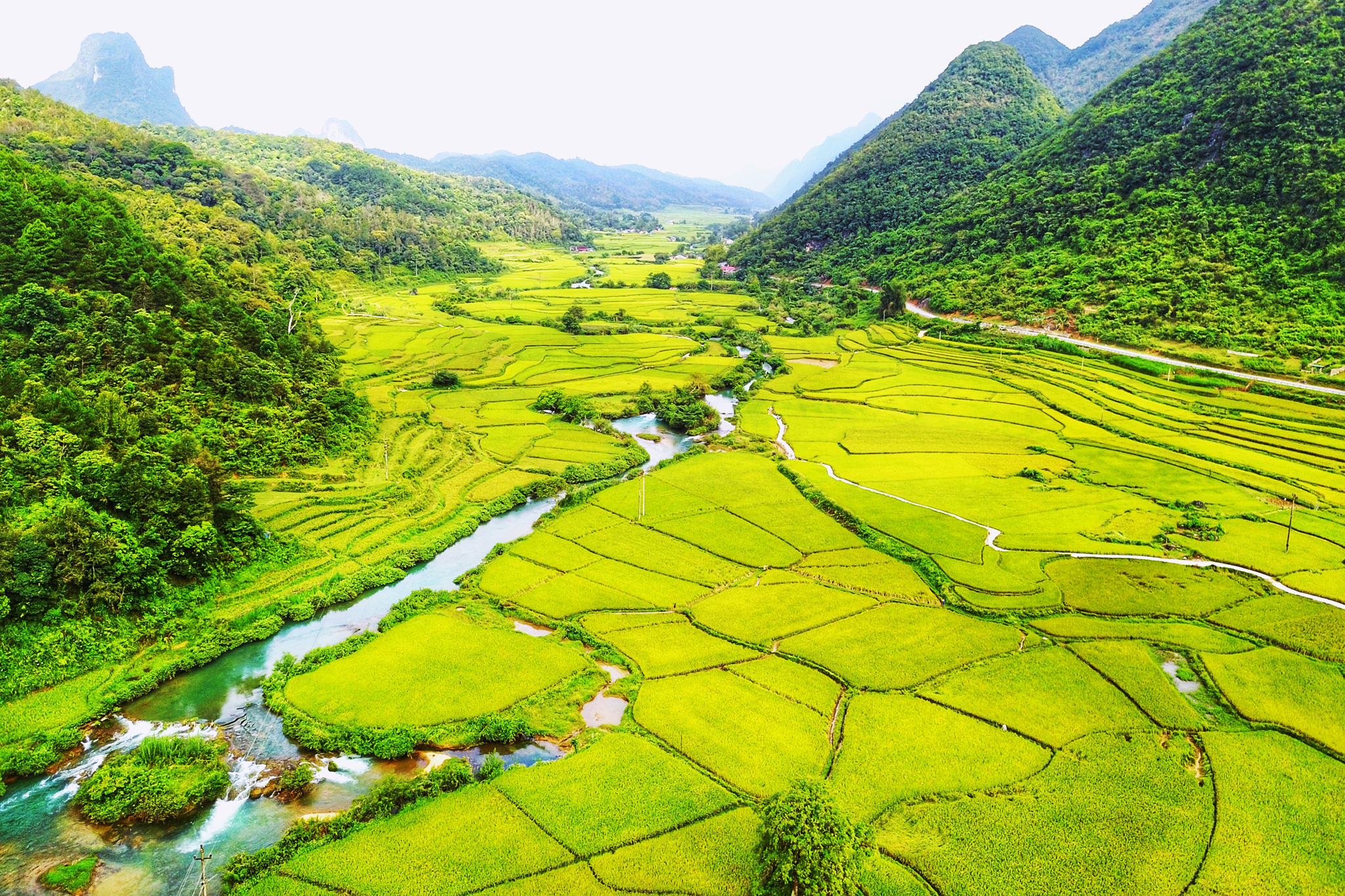
- Rice field in Hà Quảng Commune
- Interactive map of Hà Quảng
- Coordinates: 22.84472222°N 106.0961111°E
- Country: Vietnam
- Province: Cao Bằng
- Region: Northeast
- Established: 16 June 2025
- People's Committee headquarters: Bản Bó Hamlet

Area
  - Total: 112.25 km^{2} (43.34 sq mi)

Population (2025)
  - Total: 10,997
  - Density: 98/km^{2} (250/sq mi)
- Area code: 01438

Hà Quảng is a commune of Cao Bằng province, Vietnam.

== History ==
The area of present-day Hà Quảng Commune formerly comprised the communes of Hồng Sỹ, Ngọc Đào, and Mã Ba in Hà Quảng District.

On 10 January 2020, the Standing Committee of the National Assembly of Vietnam issued Resolution No. 864/NQ-UBTVQH14 on the reorganization of district- and commune-level administrative units in Cao Bằng province, which took effect on 1 February 2020. Under the resolution, the entire area and population of Đào Ngạn and Phù Ngọc communes were merged to form Ngọc Đào Commune.

On 16 June 2025:

- The National Assembly of Vietnam issued Resolution No. 203/2025/QH15 amending and supplementing several articles of the Constitution of the Socialist Republic of Vietnam, which took effect on 16 June 2025. Under the resolution, district-level administrative units ceased to operate nationwide from 1 July 2025.
- The Standing Committee of the National Assembly of Vietnam issued Resolution No. 1657/NQ-UBTVQH15 on the reorganization of commune-level administrative units of Cao Bằng province in 2025, which took effect on 16 June 2025. Under the resolution, the entire natural area and population of Hồng Sỹ, Ngọc Đào, and Mã Ba communes were reorganized to form a new commune named Hà Quảng.
