= Thanh Long, Cao Bằng =

Thanh Long
- Commune
- Interactive map of Thanh Long
- Coordinates: 22.74277778°N 105.9513889°E
- Country: Vietnam
- Province: Cao Bằng
- Region: Northeast
- Established: 16 June 2025

Area
  - Total: 118.62 km^{2} (45.80 sq mi)

Population (2025)
  - Total: 6,507
  - Density: 54/km^{2} (140/sq mi)

Thanh Long is a commune in Cao Bằng province, Vietnam.

On 16 June 2025:

- The National Assembly of Vietnam adopted Resolution No. 203/2025/QH15, amending and supplementing several articles of the Constitution of Vietnam. The resolution took effect on 16 June 2025. The resolution provided for the termination of district-level administrative units nationwide from 1 July 2025.
- The Standing Committee of the National Assembly of Vietnam issued Resolution No. 1657/NQ-UBTVQH15 on the reorganization of commune-level administrative units in Cao Bằng province in 2025, which took effect on 16 June 2025. Under the resolution, the entire area and population of the former communes of Ngọc Động, Yên Sơn, and Thanh Long were consolidated to form a new commune named Thanh Long.
