= Trùng Khánh =

Trùng Khánh Xã Trùng Khánh
- Commune
- Trùng Khánh commune
- Location within Vietnam
- Coordinates: 22°50′03″N 106°31′30″E
- Country: Vietnam
- Region: Northeast
- Province: Cao Bằng
- Time zone: UTC+7 (UTC + 7)

Trùng Khánh is a commune (xã) of Cao Bằng Province, Vietnam.
