= Bảo Lạc =

Bảo Lạc Xã Bảo Lạc
- Commune
- Location within Vietnam
- Coordinates: 22°57′4″N 105°40′42″E
- Country: Vietnam
- Region: Northeast
- Province: Cao Bằng
- Time zone: UTC+7 (UTC + 7)

Bảo Lạc is a commune (xã) of Cao Bằng Province, Vietnam.
