= Hưng Đạo, Cao Bằng =

Hưng Đạo
- Commune
- Hưng Đạo commune
- Location of in Vietnam
- Coordinates: 22°48′20″N 105°40′06″E
- Country: Vietnam
- Province: Cao Bằng province

Area
  - Total: 122.43 km^{2} (47.27 sq mi)

Population (2024)
  - Total: 9,354
  - Density: 76.40/km^{2} (197.9/sq mi)
- Climate: Aw

Hưng Đạo (Vietnamese: Xã Hưng Đạo) is a commune of Cao Bằng province, Vietnam. It is one of the 56 new wards, communes and special zones of the province following the reorganization in 2025.
