= Bảo Lâm district, Cao Bằng =

Bảo Lâm district Huyện Bảo Lâm
- District
- Interactive map of Bảo Lâm district
- Coordinates: 22.829847°N 105.493413°E
- Country: Vietnam
- Region: Northeast
- Province: Cao Bằng
- Capital: Mông Ân

Area
  - Total: 348 sq mi (902 km^{2})

Population (2019)
  - Total: 65,025
  - Density: 187/sq mi (72.1/km^{2})
- Time zone: UTC+7 (Indochina Time)

Bảo Lâm is a former rural district of Cao Bằng province in the Northeast region of Vietnam. As of 2019 the district had a population of 65,025. The district covers an area of 902 km^{2}. The district capital lies at Mông Ân.

== Administrative divisions ==
Bảo Lâm District consists of the district capital, Pác Miầu, and 12 communes: Đức Hạnh, Lý Bôn, Mông Ân, Nam Cao, Nam Quang, Quảng Lâm, Thạch Lâm, Thái Học, Thái Sơn, Vĩnh Phong, Vĩnh Quang, Yên Thổ.
