= Bảo Lâm, Cao Bằng =

Bảo Lâm Xã Bảo Lâm
- Commune
- Bảo Lâm commune
- Location within Vietnam
- Coordinates: 22°49′49″N 105°29′40″E
- Country: Vietnam
- Region: Northeast
- Province: Cao Bằng
- Time zone: UTC+7 (UTC + 7)

Bảo Lâm is a commune (xã) of Cao Bằng Province, Vietnam.

On June 16, 2025, the Standing Committee of the National Assembly issued Resolution No. 1657/NQ-UBTVQH15 on the reorganization of commune-level administrative units in Cao Bằng Province in 2025. Accordingly, the entire natural area and population of Pác Miầu Township, Mông Ân Commune, and Vĩnh Phong Commune were reorganized to form a new commune named Bảo Lâm.
