= Quảng Uyên =

Quảng Uyên Xã Quảng Uyên
- Commune
- Quảng Uyên commune
- Location within Vietnam
- Coordinates: 22°47′7″N 105°58′59″E
- Country: Vietnam
- Region: Northeast
- Province: Cao Bằng

Area
  - Total: 7.13 sq mi (18.46 km^{2})

Population
  - Total: 6,089
  - Density: 850/sq mi (330/km^{2})
- Time zone: UTC+7 (UTC + 7)

Quảng Uyên is a commune of Cao Bằng Province.

The commune was the district capital of former Quảng Uyên District.
