= Hòa An, Cao Bằng =

Hòa An Xã Hòa An
- Commune
- Hòa An commune
- Location within Vietnam
- Coordinates: 22°44′17″N 106°09′08″E
- Country: Vietnam
- Region: Northeast
- Province: Cao Bằng
- Time zone: UTC+7 (UTC + 7)

Hòa An is a commune (xã) of Cao Bằng Province, Vietnam.

On June 12, 2025, the Standing Committee of the National Assembly issued Resolution No. 1657/NQ-UBTVQH15 on the reorganization of commune-level administrative units in Cao Bằng Province. Accordingly, the entire natural area and population of Nước Hai Township, Đại Tiến Commune, and Hồng Việt Commune were merged to form a new commune named Hòa An.
