= Hòa An district =

Coordinates: 22.750°N 106.167°E

Hòa An district Huyện Hòa An
- District
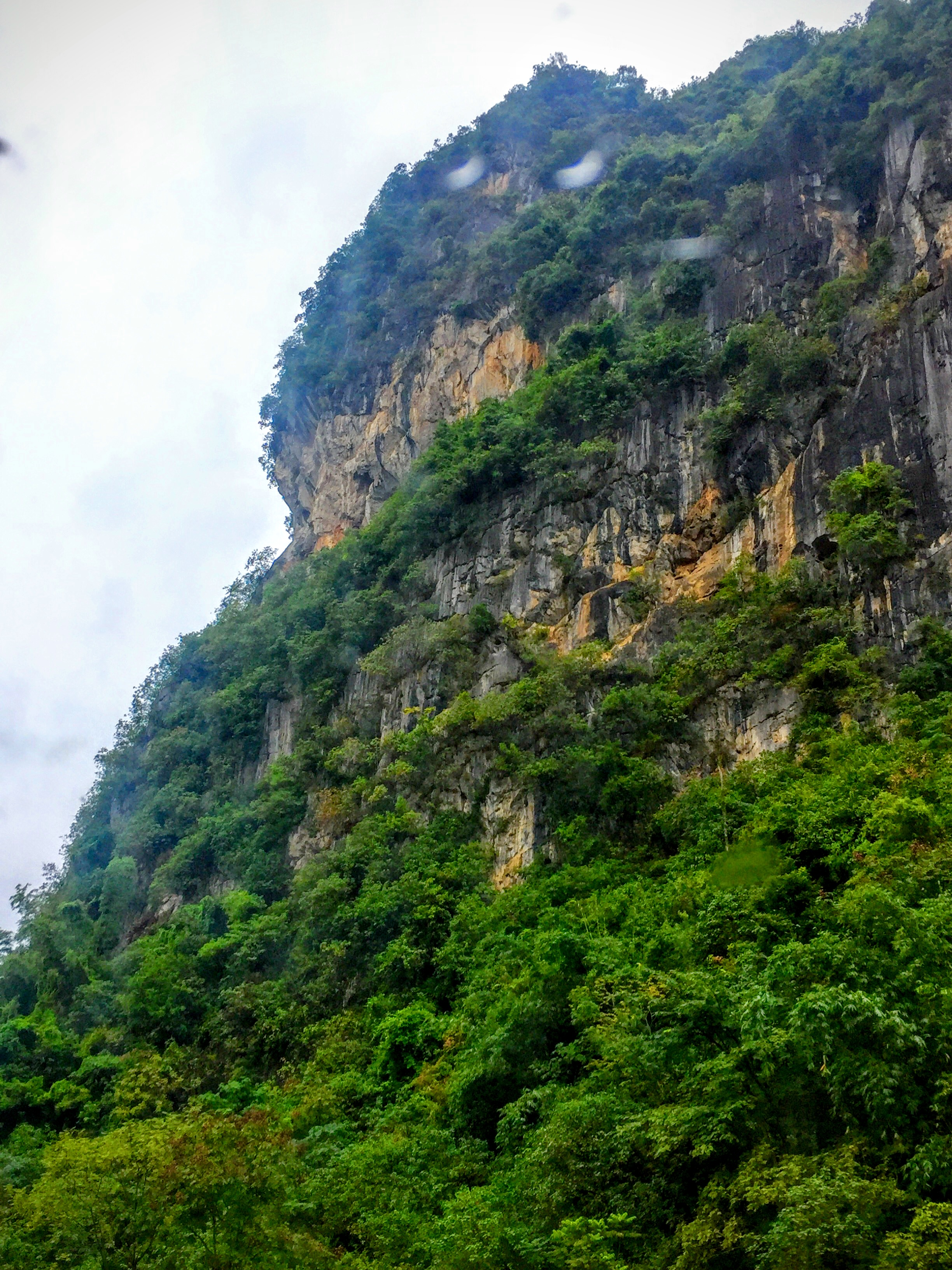
- Overlooking a cave in Hòa An

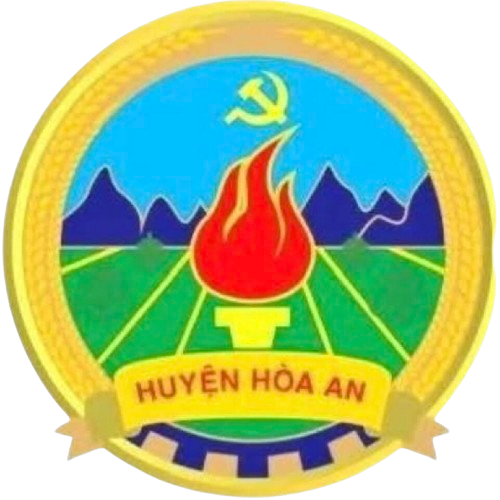
- Seal
- Interactive map of Hòa An district
- Country: Vietnam
- Region: Northeast
- Province: Cao Bằng
- Capital: Nước Hai
- Time zone: UTC+07:00 (Indochina Standard Time)

Hòa An is a former rural district (huyện) of Cao Bằng province in the Northeast region of Vietnam.

== Administrative divisions ==
Hòa An District consists of the district capital, Nước Hai, and 21 communes: Dân Chủ, Đức Long, Công Trừng, Trương Lương, Bình Long, Nam Tuấn, Đại Tiến, Đức Xuân, Ngũ Lão, Bế Triều, Vĩnh Quang, Hồng Việt, Hoàng Tung, Bình Dương, Bạch Đằng, Lê Chung, Chu Trinh, Hà Trì, Quang Trung, Nguyễn Huệ and Hưng Đạo.
