= Cao Bằng province =

Province of Vietnam

Cao Bằng
- Province
- Tỉnh Cao Bằng 省高平
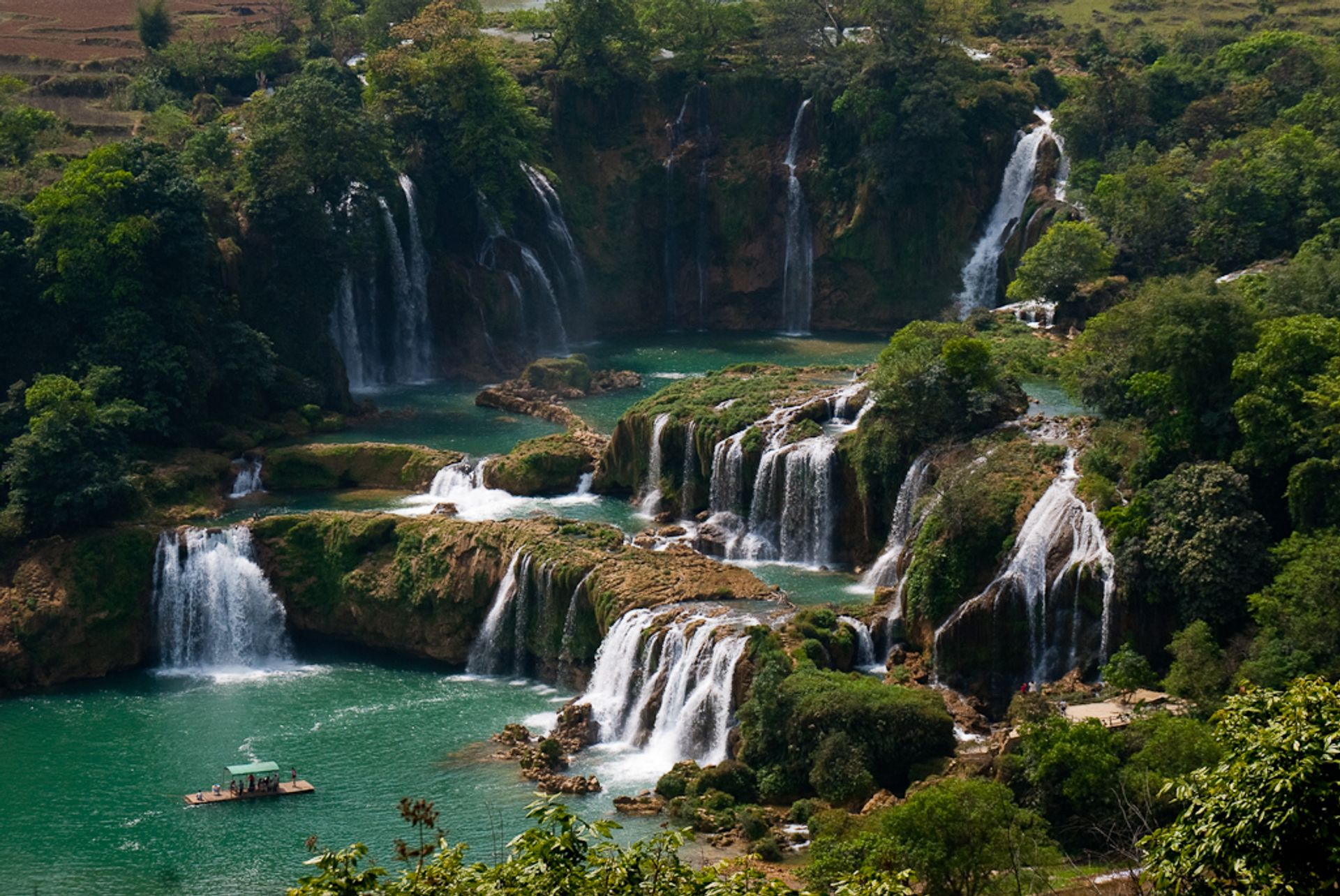
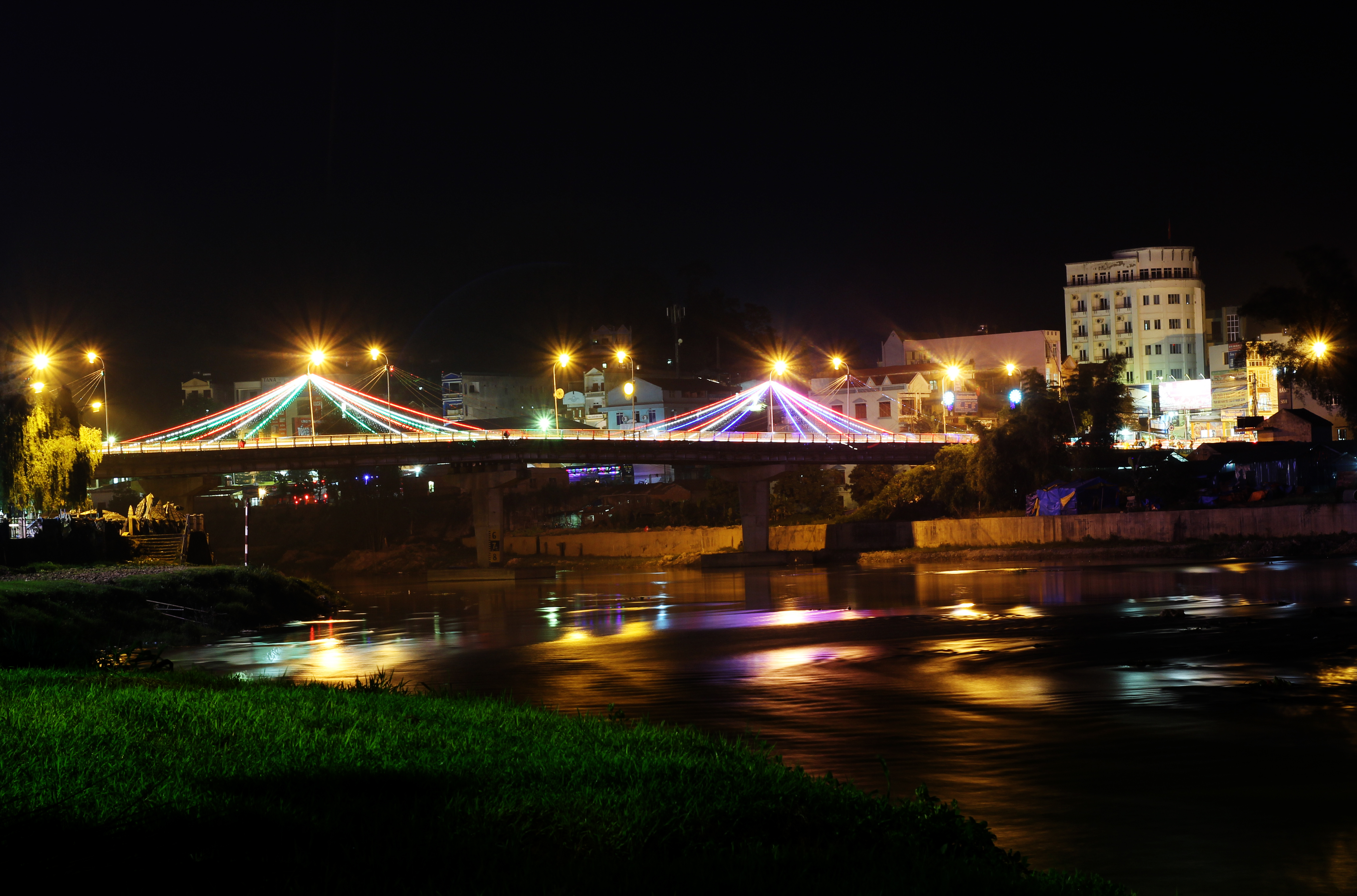
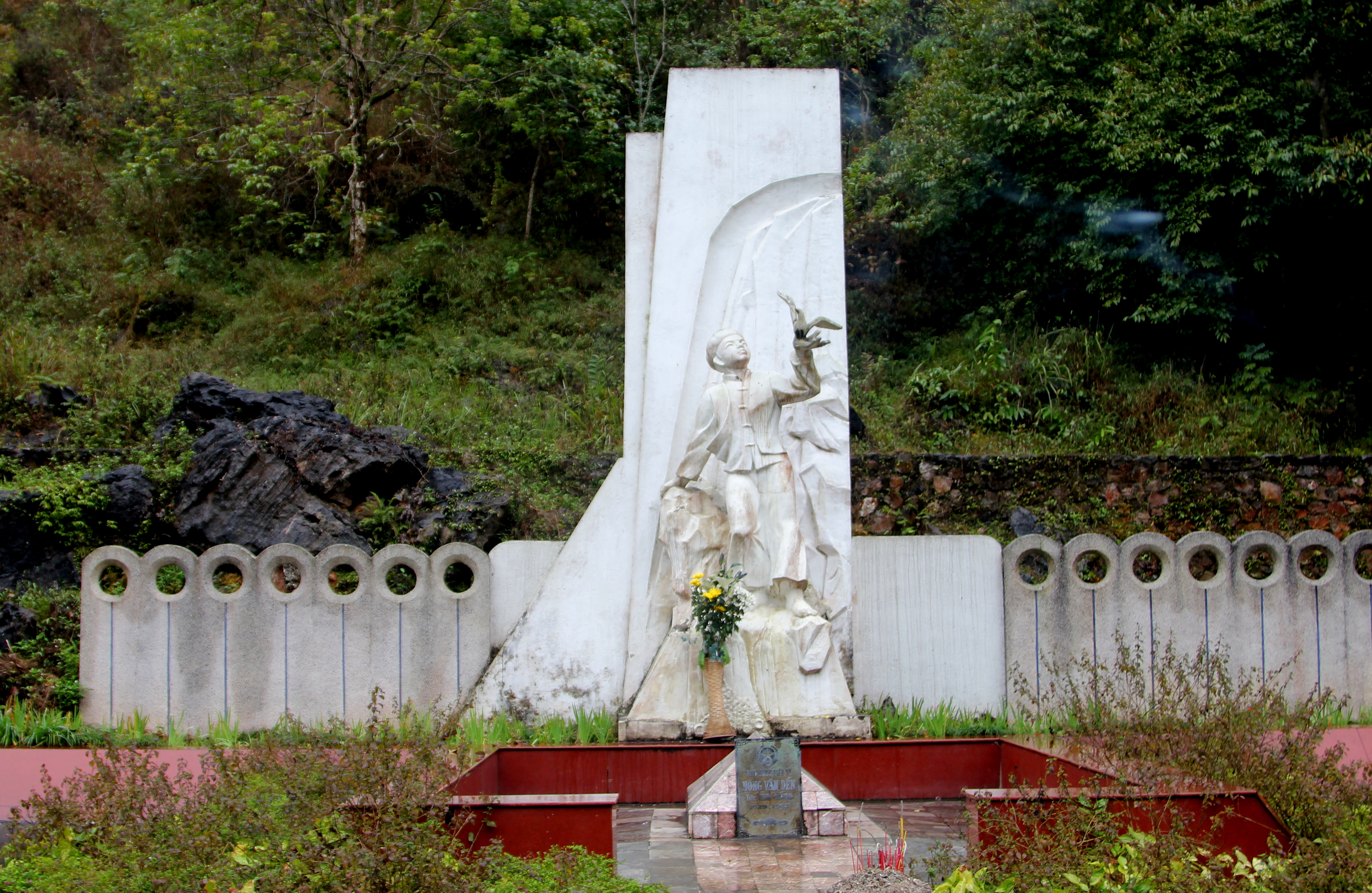
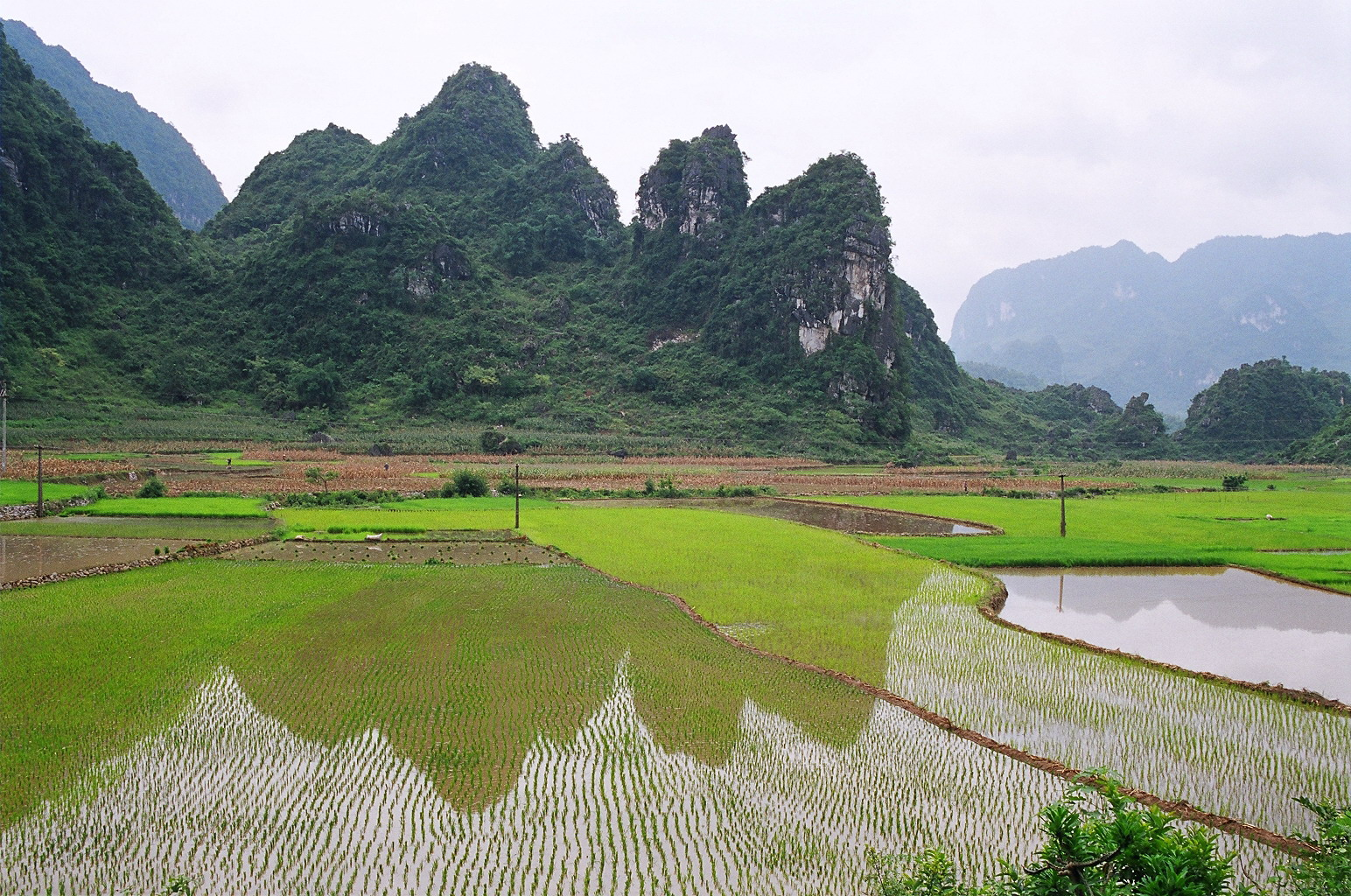
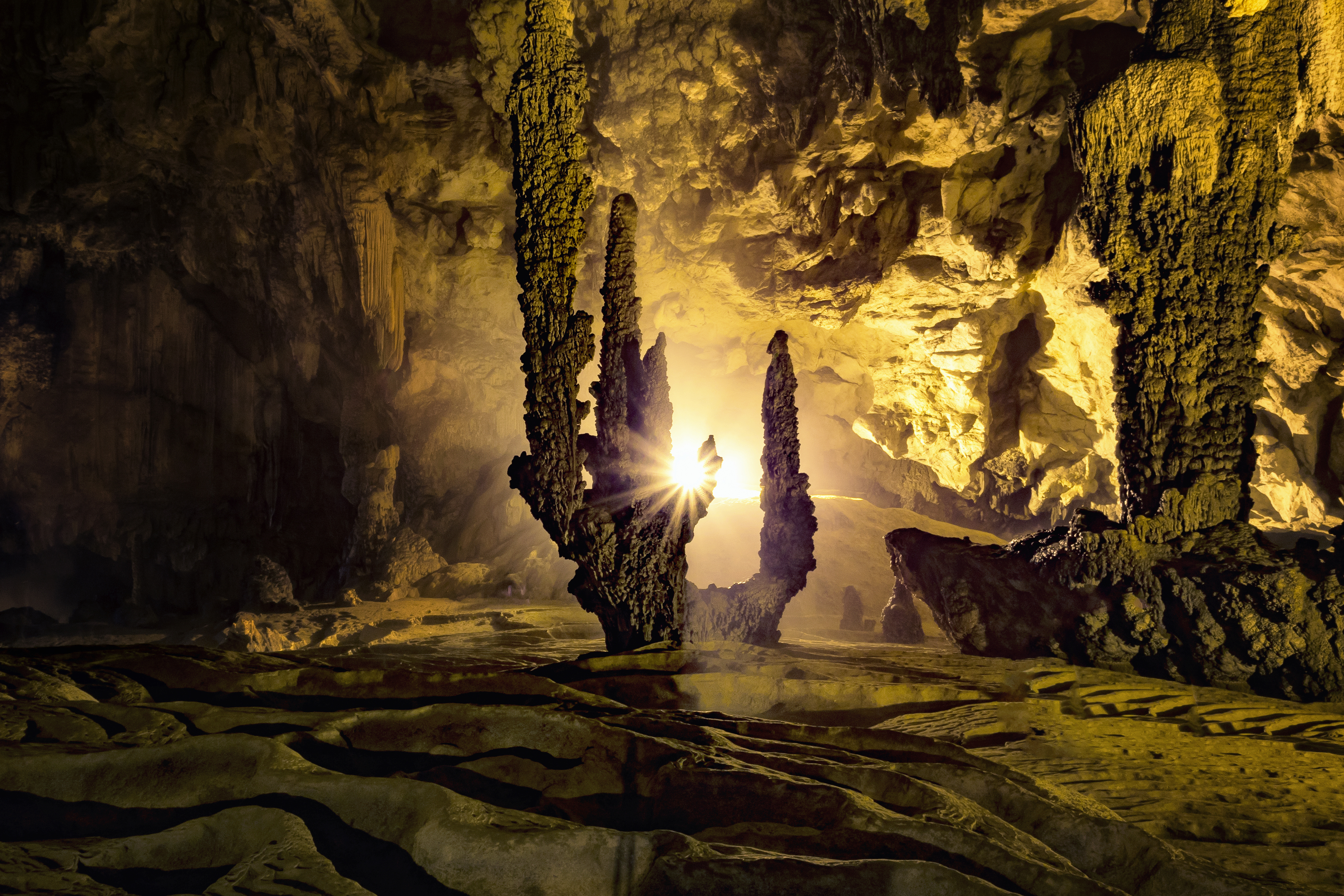
- From top, left to right: Ban Gioc Falls, Bằng Giang Bridge, Kim Đồng Tomb, Paddy field in Cao Bằng, Ngườm Ngao Cave

- Seal
- Nickname: High Plateau
- Location of Cao Bằng within Vietnam
- Interactive map of Cao Bằng
- Coordinates: 22°40′N 106°0′E
- Country: Vietnam
- Region: Northeast
- Capital: Thục Phán
- Subdivision: 3 wards, 53 communes

Government
  - Type: Province
  - Body: Cao Bằng Provincial People's Council
  - Chairman of People's Committee: Hoàng Xuân Ánh

Area
  - Total: 6,700.39 km^{2} (2,587.04 sq mi)

Population (2025)
  - Total: 573,119
  - Density: 85.5352/km^{2} (221.535/sq mi)

Ethnic groups
  - Tày: 40.84%
  - Nùng: 29.81%
  - Mông: 11.65%
  - Dao: 10.36%
  - Vietnamese: 5.12%
  - Others: 2.22%

GDP
  - Province: VND 14.429 trillion US$ 0.627 billion
- Time zone: UTC+07:00 (ICT)
- Area codes: 206
- ISO 3166 code: VN-04
- HDI (2020): ▲0.659 (57th)
- Website: www.caobang.gov.vn

Cao Bằng ([kāw ɓɐ̀ŋ]) is a province of the Northeast region of Vietnam. The province has borders with Tuyên Quang, Thái Nguyên and Lạng Sơn provinces within Vietnam. It has an international border with Guangxi Zhuang autonomous region in China. The province covers 6,700.39 km^{2} (2,587.04 mi^{2}) and, as of 2023, has a population of 547,849 people.

== History ==
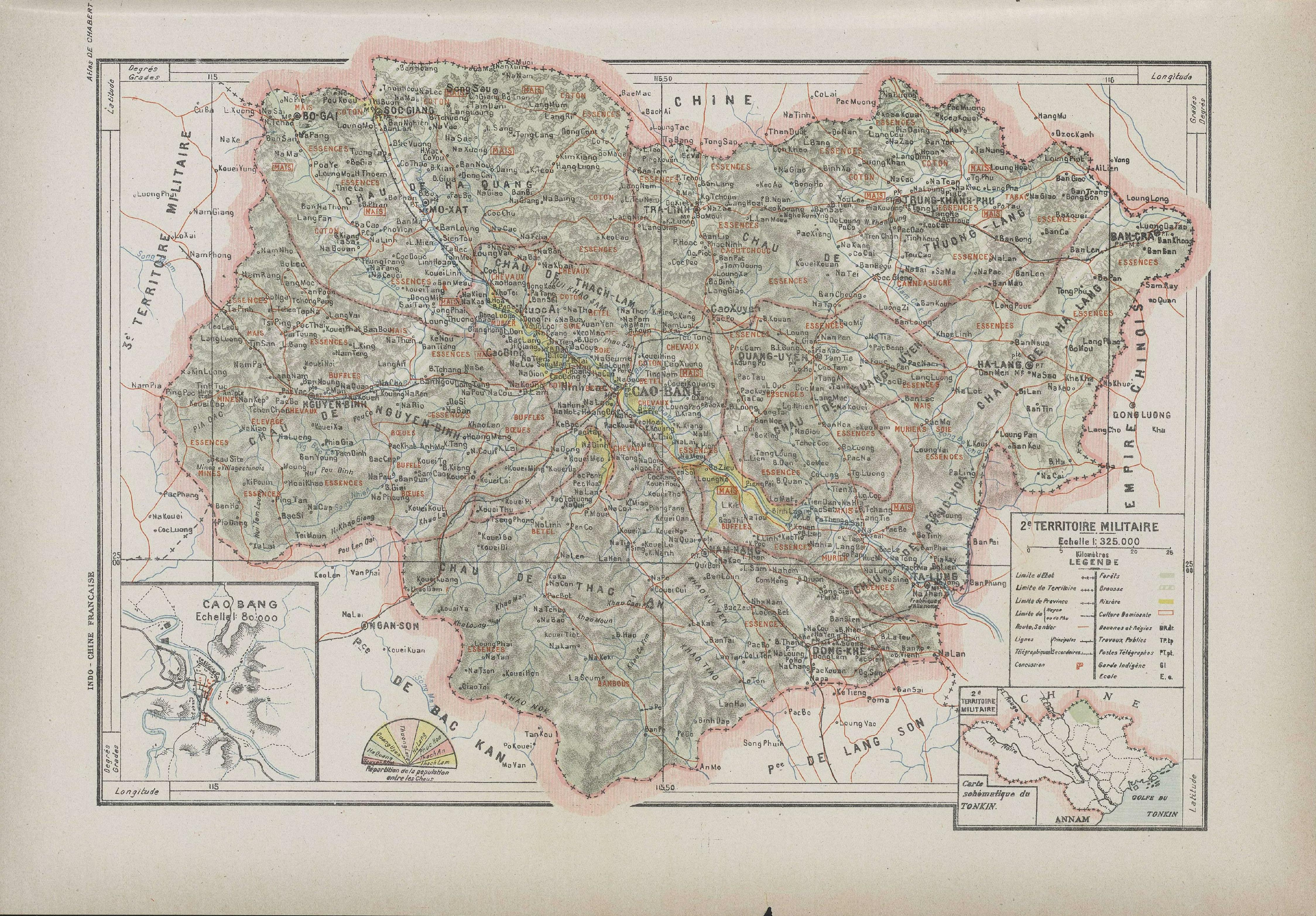
Map of Cao Bang province in 1909

Cao Bằng's history can be traced to the Bronze Age with the Tày Tây Âu Kingdom. The Tây Âu or Âu Việt were a conglomeration of upland Tai tribes living in what later is northernmost Vietnam, western Guangdong, and southern Guangxi, China, since at least the 3rd century BC.

Cao Bằng's proximity to China has meant that it has had a somewhat turbulent history, having changed hands a number of times. What are later the provinces of Cao Bằng and Lạng Sơn were known as châu Quảng Nguyên during the time of the Lý and Trần Dynasties. Quảng Nguyên became part of Đại Việt in 1039, when Emperor Lý Thái Tông expelled Nùng Trí Cao, a Tày-Nùng leader, from the area.

In the 14th century, Tày lords dynasties ruled the area, such as Bế Khắc Thiệu and Nga Dac Thai. In the 1430s, the Lê Dynasty had rebellions. Royalty faced revolt during the 16th and 17th century – Mạc Đăng Dung initially occupied the territory and the Lê throne in 1527. The Lê kings were reinstated in 1592. The war for control of the region continued and the Mạc family had the upper hand as they declared it an independent region and ruled for 75 years. As witness to this period, here lie ruins of a temple, which was also the palace of the Mạc Kings. It can be seen in the town of Cao Bình, which is located about 12 kilometres (7.5 mi) north of the town of Cao Bằng. Cao Bình was an administrative town until the French occupied the territory; the capital was shifted to the Cao Bằng peninsula when the French conquered the area in 1884. They fortified the town with a fort on a hill overlooking the town. This fort area is later a high-security zone of the People's Army of Vietnam.

Cao Bằng has a history of revolutionaries and nationalists. The history of the peninsula to the regime is recorded from the 1920s when it became the "cradle of the revolutionary movement in the north". Pro-independence groups based themselves in the mountains. The Communist Party of Vietnam chose the province as a base, using the rough terrain as protection. Hồ Chí Minh, on his return from China in exile in 1941, made his headquarters at Pắc Bó, in Trường Hà commune, Hà Quảng District, 56 kilometres (35 mi) north of Cao Bằng for the decisive revolutionary movement between 1940 and 1945.

In 1950, the province had 10 districts: Bảo Lạc, Hạ Lang, Hòa An, Nguyên Bình, Phú Thạch, Phục Hòa, Quảng Uyên, Thạch An, Trấn Biên and Trùng Khánh. In 1958, Trấn Biên was renamed Trà Lĩnh. The district of Thông Nông was created out of part of the district of Hà Quảng by Decision 67-CP on 7 April 1966. The districts of Phục Hòa and Quảng Uyên were merged to become Quảng Hòa by Decision 27-CP on 8 March 1967. The district of Hạ Lang was abolished and integrated into the districts of Quảng Hòa and Trùng Khánh by Decision 176-CP on 15 September 1969.

In December 1978, the two districts of Ngân Sơn and Chợ Rã were transferred from the province of Bắc Thái to Cao Bằng by a decree of the congress of the Communist Party. This meant that Cao Bằng had 11 districts: Bảo Lạc, Hà Quảng, Hòa An, Nguyên Bình, Quảng Hòa, Thạch An, Thông Nông, Trà Lĩnh, Trùng Khánh, Ngân Sơn and Chợ Rã. The district of Chợ Rã was renamed Ba Bể by Decision 144-HĐBT on 6 November 1984.

On 27 February 1979, during the Sino-Vietnamese War, Chinese troops entered and occupied the city of Cao Bằng, inflicting a "scorched earth" policy by levelling most of the city, including places of worship. The historical areas near the Pác Bó caves in the commune of Trường Hà in Hà Quảng district were mined and bombed, demolishing most of the cave mouth where Hồ Chí Minh based his guerrilla activities in the 1940s and 1950s. In 1996, the districts of Ngân Sơn and Ba Bể were transferred into the newly created province of Bắc Kạn. The district of Bảo Lâm was created by carving out a portion of Bảo Lạc District, in accordance with Decree 52/2000/NĐ-CP on 25 September 2000.

Since 1 July 2025, Cao Bằng is subdivided into 56 commune-level sub-divisions.

== Geography ==
Cao Bằng has borders with Tuyên Quang, Thái Nguyên, and Lạng Sơn provinces within Vietnam. It has an international border (322 kilometres (200 mi) long) with the Guangxi province of the People's Republic of China.

The average temperature reported in the province is 22 °C (72 °F). Winter temperatures in some areas occasionally experience freezing conditions and some amount of snowfall. The Bản Giốc Waterfall which is on the border with China is a natural feature in the province.

The Peninsular valley of Cao Bằng province is formed between the Bằng Giang and Hien rivers. The two rivers confluence to the northwest of the town. In the war with China the town was damaged in 1979 and has been since rebuilt. The market in Cao Bằng town is believed to be the largest in Vietnam. Cao Bằng town is located on Highway 3 and is 270 kilometres (170 mi) from Hanoi. The road from Thái Nguyên to Cao Bằng passes through the Cao Bắc Pass. Since the elevation of the town is 300 metres (980 ft) it has a salubrious temperate climate throughout the year.

=== Climate ===
Climate data for Cao Bằng
Month	Jan	Feb	Mar	Apr	May	Jun	Jul	Aug	Sep	Oct	Nov	Dec	Year
Mean daily maximum °C (°F)	18 (64)	19 (66)	23 (73)	27 (81)	31 (88)	32 (90)	32 (90)	32 (90)	31 (88)	27 (81)	24 (75)	20 (68)	26 (80)
Mean daily minimum °C (°F)	10 (50)	12 (54)	16 (61)	19 (66)	23 (73)	24 (75)	24 (75)	24 (75)	22 (72)	19 (66)	15 (59)	11 (52)	18 (65)
Average rainfall mm (inches)	22 (0.9)	26 (1.0)	39 (1.5)	91 (3.6)	174 (6.9)	229 (9.0)	224 (8.8)	249 (9.8)	150 (5.9)	91 (3.6)	44 (1.7)	20 (0.8)	1,359 (53.5)
Average rainy days	10	10	12	14	15	17	18	19	14	12	9	8	158
Mean monthly sunshine hours	62	56	93	120	186	150	186	186	180	155	120	124	1,618
Source: World Climate Guide

== Administrative divisions ==
Cao Bằng is divided into 56 commune-level administrative units, include 3 wards and 53 communes:

- 3 wards: Thục Phán, Nùng Trí Cao, Tân Giang.
- 53 communes: Bạch Đằng, Bảo Lạc, Bảo Lâm, Bế Văn Đàn, Ca Thành, Canh Tân, Cần Yên, Cô Ba, Cốc Pàng, Đàm Thủy, Đình Phong, Đoài Dương, Độc Lập, Đông Khê, Đức Long, Hạ Lang, Hà Quảng, Hạnh Phúc, Hòa An, Huy Giáp, Hưng Đạo, Khánh Xuân, Kim Đồng, Lũng Nặm, Lý Bôn, Lý Quốc, Minh Khai, Minh Tâm, Nam Quang, Nam Tuấn, Nguyên Bình, Nguyễn Huệ, Phan Thanh, Phục Hòa, Quan Hán, Quản Lâm, Quang Long, Quang Trung, Quảng Uyên, Sơn Lộ, Tam Kim, Thạch An, Thành Công, Thanh Long, Thông Nông, Tĩnh Túc, Tổng Cọt, Trà Lĩnh, Trùng Khánh, Trường Hà, Vinh Quý, Xuân Trường, Yên Thổ.

== Demographics ==
According to the General Statistics Office of the Government of Vietnam, the population of Cao Bằng province as of 2019 was 530,341 with a density of 79 persons per km^{2} over a total land area of 6,700.26 square kilometres (2,586.98 mi^{2}). The male population during this period was 265,620 while the female population was 264,721. The rural population was 406,934 against an urban population of 123,407 (about 30% of the rural population).

There are more than 40 ethnic groups in Hà Giang recognized by the Vietnamese government. Each ethnicity has their own language, traditions, and subculture. The largest ethnic groups are: Tày (40.84%), Nùng (29.81%), Mông (11.65%), Dao (10.36%), Vietnamese (5.12%). Others accounted for the remaining 2.22%.

== Economy ==
As against the national figure of 7,592 of Agriculture, Forestry and Fishery cooperatives there are 4 cooperatives in the province; all are agricultural cooperatives. There are 57 farms compared to the national total of 120,699.

The output value of agriculture produce at constant 1994 prices in the province was 676.6 billion đồngs against the national value of 156,681.9 billion đồngs. In 1994 the province produced 151,800 tonnes of cereals compared to the national production of 229.1 million tonnes. The per capita production of cereals in the district was 448.6 kg as against the national figure of 501.8 kg in 2007. In 2007, the industrial output of the province was 571.8 billion đồngs against the national output of 1.47 million billion đồngs.

== Landmarks ==
The city of Cao Bằng has buildings of World War II vintage of French design, which were in ruins and have since been rebuilt. There is an 'Exhibition Centre' in the town where the history of the revolutionary struggle in Vietnam, which originated in this province, is displayed along with Hồ Chí Minh's vintage car, bearing the registration number "BAC 808".

Pác Bó

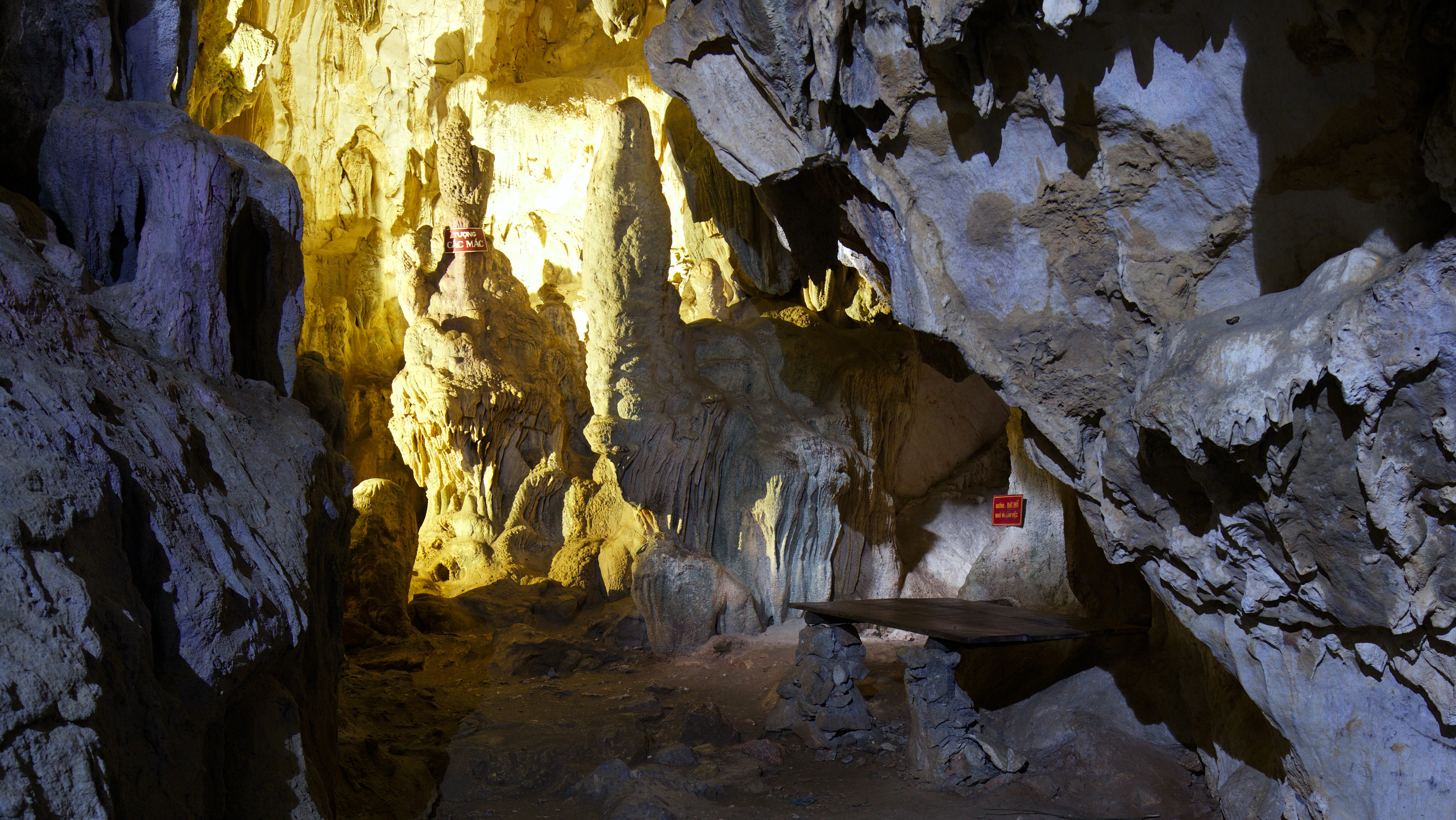
Cốc Bó cave

Pác Bó is located at the headwaters of the Lenin Stream. Hồ Chí Minh, on his return from China (where he had lived for 30 years) on 28 January 1941, established a revolutionary force at a cave near Pác Bó valley inhabited by the Nùng tribes. He organized the revolutionary movement by training the cadres, translated the History of the Communist Party in the USSR into the Vietnamese language and edited a revolutionary newspaper called the 'Independent Vietnam' from Pác Bó. The Vietnam Independence League (Việt Nam Độc Lập Đồng Minh Hội), known by its short form as Việt Minh, was established here during the Eighth Congress of the Communist Party Central Committee held at Pác Bó from 10 to 19 March 1941. The Pac Ba Vestiges Area Exhibition Centre has an array of display of artifacts of the revolution with a Hồ Chí Minh House of Remembrance. A stream and a hill near Pác Bó were named as "Lenin Stream" and "Karl Marx Mountain".

Kỳ Sầm Temple

Kỳ Sầm Temple was built as a memorial at Nùng village (200 metres (660 ft) east of Highway 203) of Ngan in honour of Nùng Trí Cao, Nùng Lord of Quảng Uyên for organizing the ethnic minority revolt in the 11th century against the Vietnamese monarchy. The first effort at rebellion against the King Lý Thái Tông was started by Nùng Trí Cao's father, Nùng Tồn Phúc, and elder brother, Nùng Trí Thông. This failed and both were caught and executed. Two years later Cao mobilised a rebellion army and captured the territory and declared himself as the king of the Nùng Kingdom and named it as Dai Lich. This occupancy ended when he was captured by Viet forces. He was let go by the King and allowed to return to Quảng Uyên. Six years later he again launched a rebellion against the king in 1048 and captured the territory in southern China and declared himself as the "Emperor of Đại Nam." His kingdom survived for 5 years by the manipulation of the King of China and the King of Viet. In 1053 the Vietnamese king Lý Thái Tông captured Cao and executed him. The temple built in his honour is a refurbished monument (renovated in the 19th century) consisting of two buildings. The outer building has the altar of one of his generals and the inner shrine housed the images of Cao, his wife and his mother till they were stolen years ago. An inscription here narrates Cao's war exploits and his avowed commitment to the cause of his nation.

Coi Binh Church

Coi Binh Church is one of the three churches that were built in 1906 by the French; the other two are at Cao Bằng and Thất Khê. Except for the Vicar's house the rest of the residential buildings around the church were destroyed in 1979. The vicarage is later the venue of "Cao Bằng region's most famous apiaries".

Mạc King's Temple

Mạc King's Temple is the 16th-century palace of the Mạc Dynasty. It is located on a hill top above the Làng Đến (meaning the "Temple Village"). It is located on the west bank of the Dau Gen River, which is a tributary of the Bằng Giang River. The construction of this palace is credited to a general of the Lê Army in 1521–1522 after he forcibly dethroned the 11 year King Lê Chiêu Tông, exiled him and installed his brother Lê Thung as the king. Two years later Lê Chiêu Tông was reinstalled as the King of Đại Việt. The Mạc Dynasty then ruled for 65 years. The Lê dynasty continued to fight the Mạc Kings and finally succeeded in regaining power in 1592 with the help of the Trịnh family. A nephew of Mạc Mậu Hợp took control of Cao Bằng and three generations of his family ruled for 75 years till the armies of the Trịnh family captured Cao Bằng in 1667. The palace building has cannons placed near the main entrance.

Bản Giốc waterfall

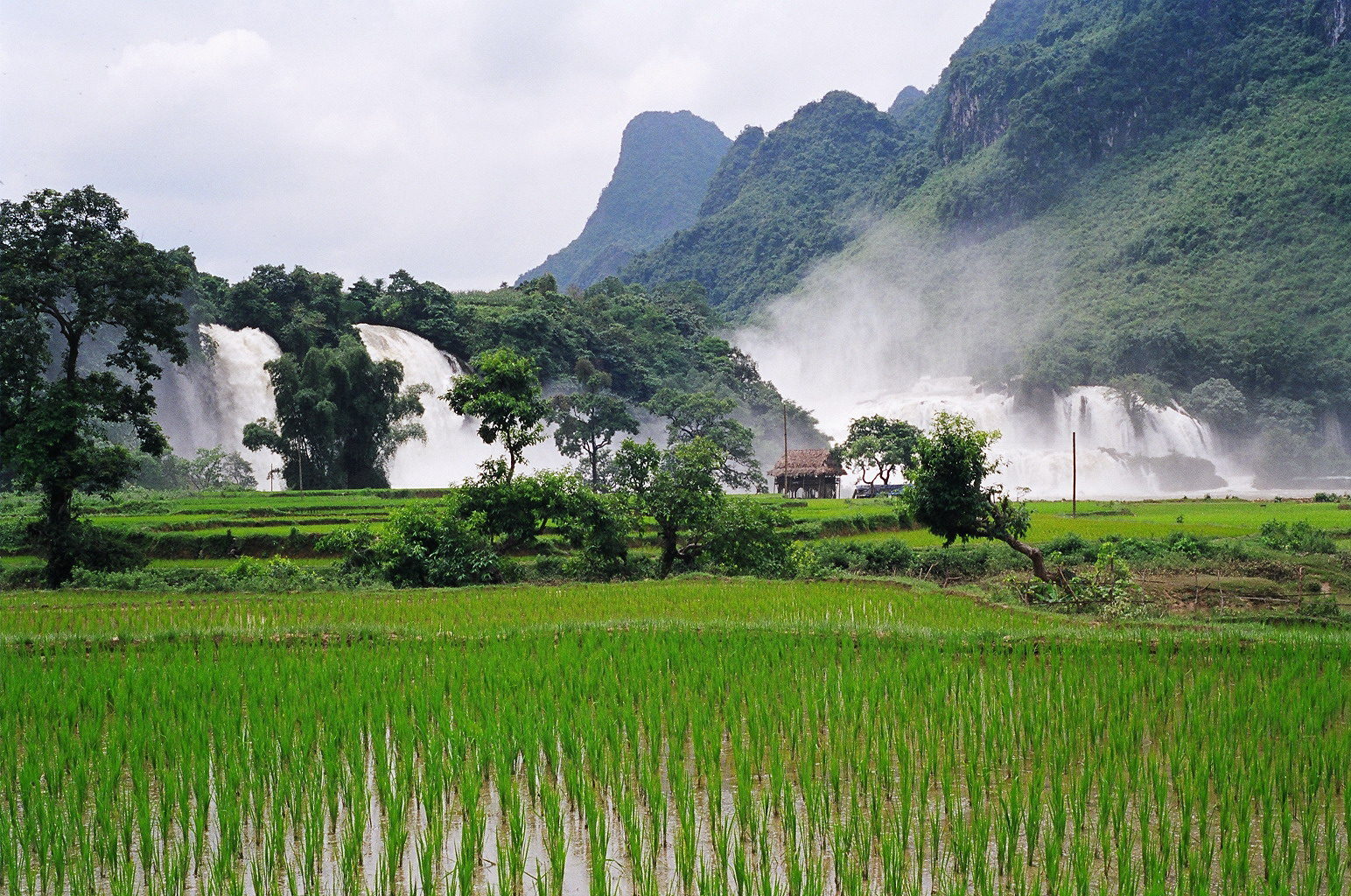
Bản Giốc waterfall during the rainy season

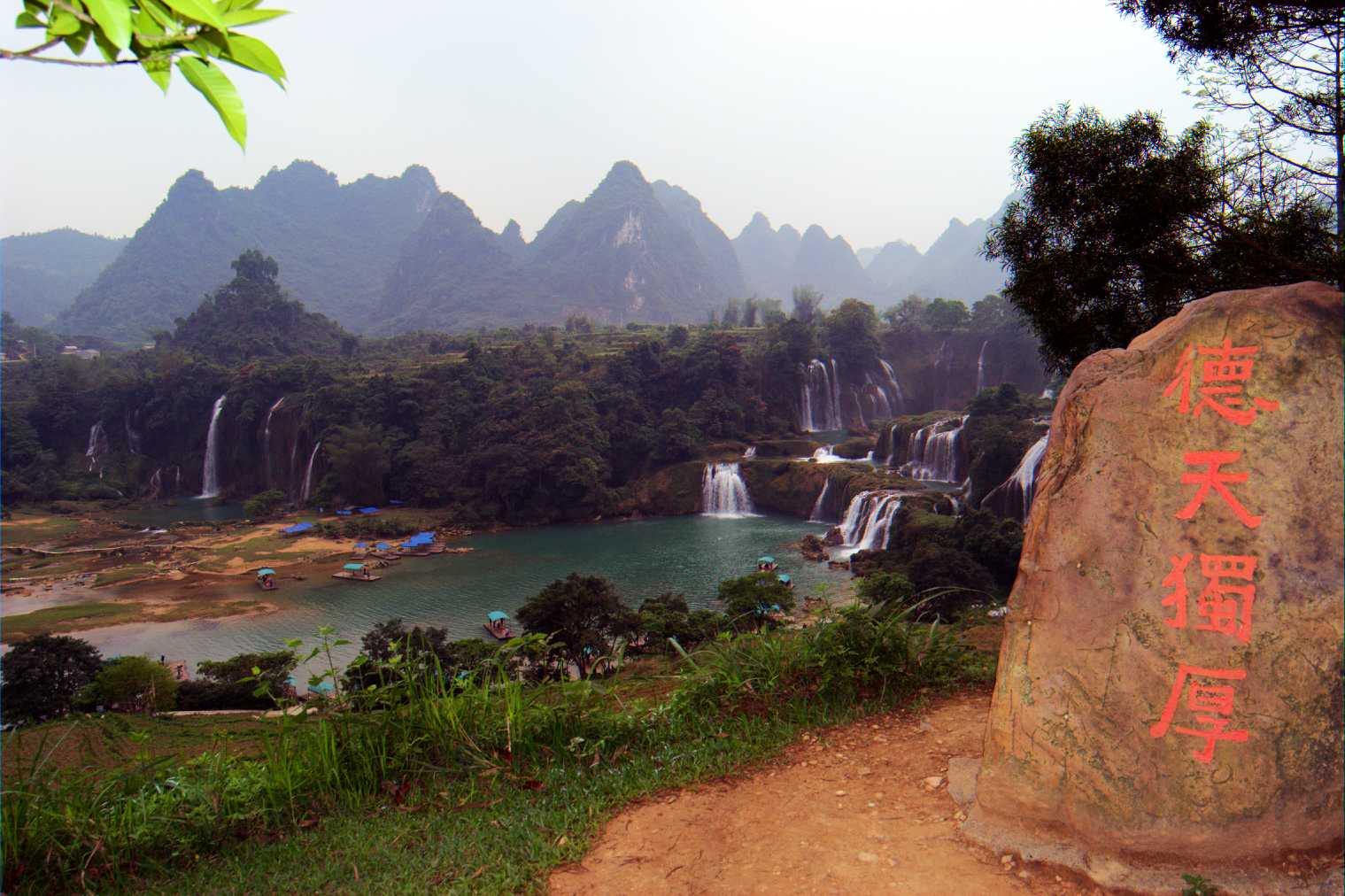
Bản Giốc waterfall during the dry season

Bản Giốc Waterfalls are located 80 kilometres (50 mi) north of Cao Bằng at the Vietnam-China Border. It originates from the Quây Sơn River and falls over a height of 30 metres (98 ft) and is 300 metres (980 ft) wide. At the top, the waterfall is seen in three parts divided by rocks and trees. As the water falls down the cliff and merges with sunlight, a seven-coloured rainbow formation is witnessed. Green trees and flowers that perfume the air are located at the base of the fall.

The Bản Giốc waterfall area at the Vietnam-China border is stated to be "among areas having a borderline defined on rivers and streams". It has been clarified by the Head of the Border Committee that the borderline of the fall shall be as fixed along the median of the main flow which shall be done jointly by both sides. While in Vietnam the two falls are considered as one fall with the name Bản Giốc, the physical fact is that the waterfall is named under two ownership divisions namely, "Detian - Banyue Falls" (Chinese: 德天瀑布 & 板約瀑布) or "Bản Giốc Falls" (Vietnamese: thác Bản Giốc). (Note: The two falls have separate names in Chinese: Dé Tiān=德天=Đức Thiên;Bǎn Yuē=板約=Bản Giốc.)

This water fall is the 4th largest waterfall along a national border in the world, the other three are Iguazu Falls, Victoria Falls, and Niagara Falls, in that order. It was one of the crossing points for China's army during the Sino-Vietnamese War. Nearby there is the Tongling Gorge accessible only through a cavern from an adjoining gorge. It has species of endemic plants found in the gorge. This cave was a hideout for the local bandits whose treasure is occasionally found in the cliff-side caves. Bản Giốc Fall has the fish species "tram huong." During the 1920s, this was a hunting and fishing location for the French who built cottages for this purpose.

Thang Hen Mountain lake

Thang Hen Mountain lake, in Trà Lĩnh Commune, consists of 36 natural lakes located on the top of a hill at 1,000 metres (3,300 ft). The lakes have been created in limestone formations and some of them flow out as steams. A feature of the lakes is that their water level fluctuates like the tides of the seas, which phenomenon is attributed to the springs of water emerging from artesian wells in limestone formations. The lakes flow through the river, which eventually becomes the Bản Giốc waterfall.

God's Eye Mountain

Located in Trà Lĩnh Commune, the Eye of God Mountain is a tourist destination at the Non Nuoc Cao Bang UNESCO Global Geopark.

From August to October, the water volume in Cao Bang reaches its highest level and the falls cascade in white streams. During this time, the surrounding terraced rice fields turn golden at harvest season. From October onward, the water flow becomes calmer and clearer. November and December are months for viewing wild sunflowers and buckwheat flowers, while pear blossoms typically bloom in March.

== Gallery ==
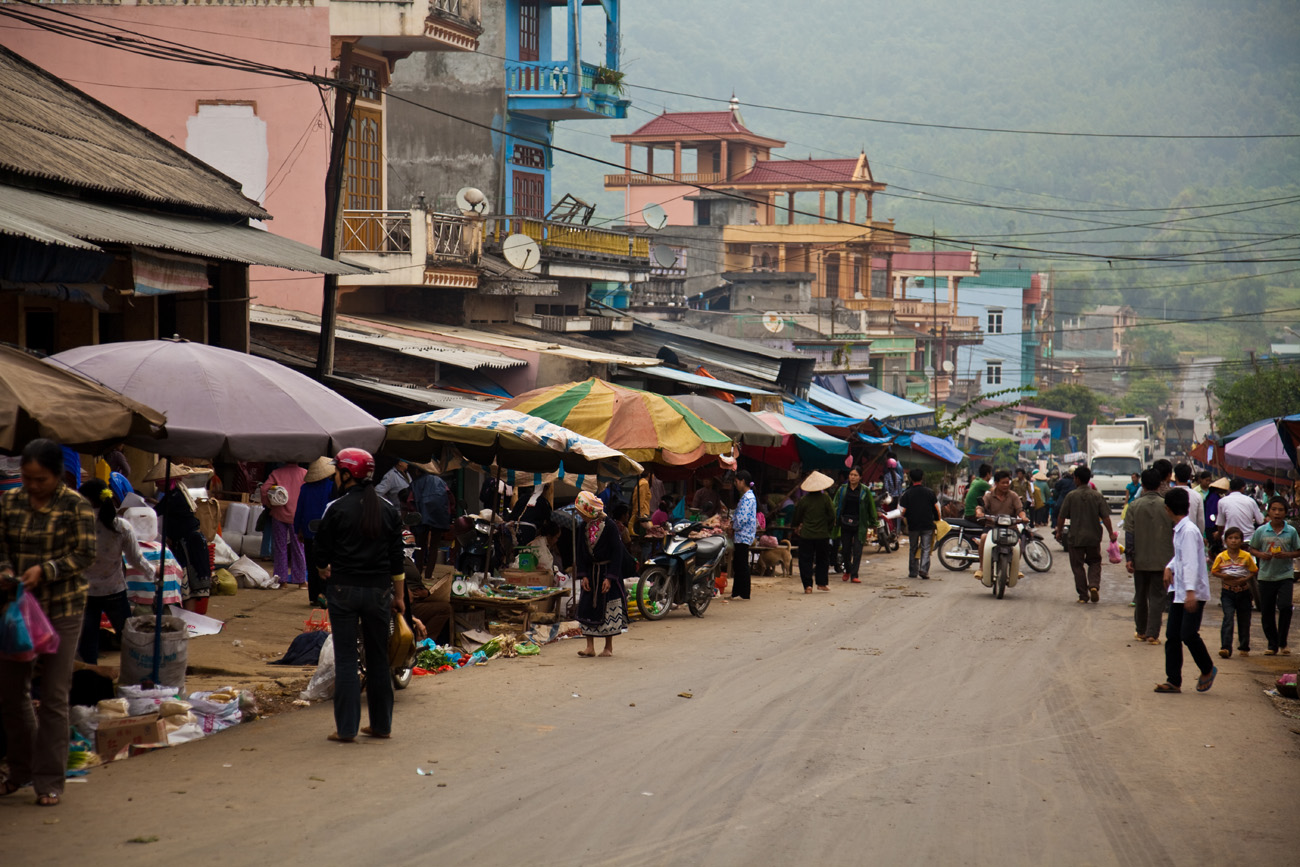

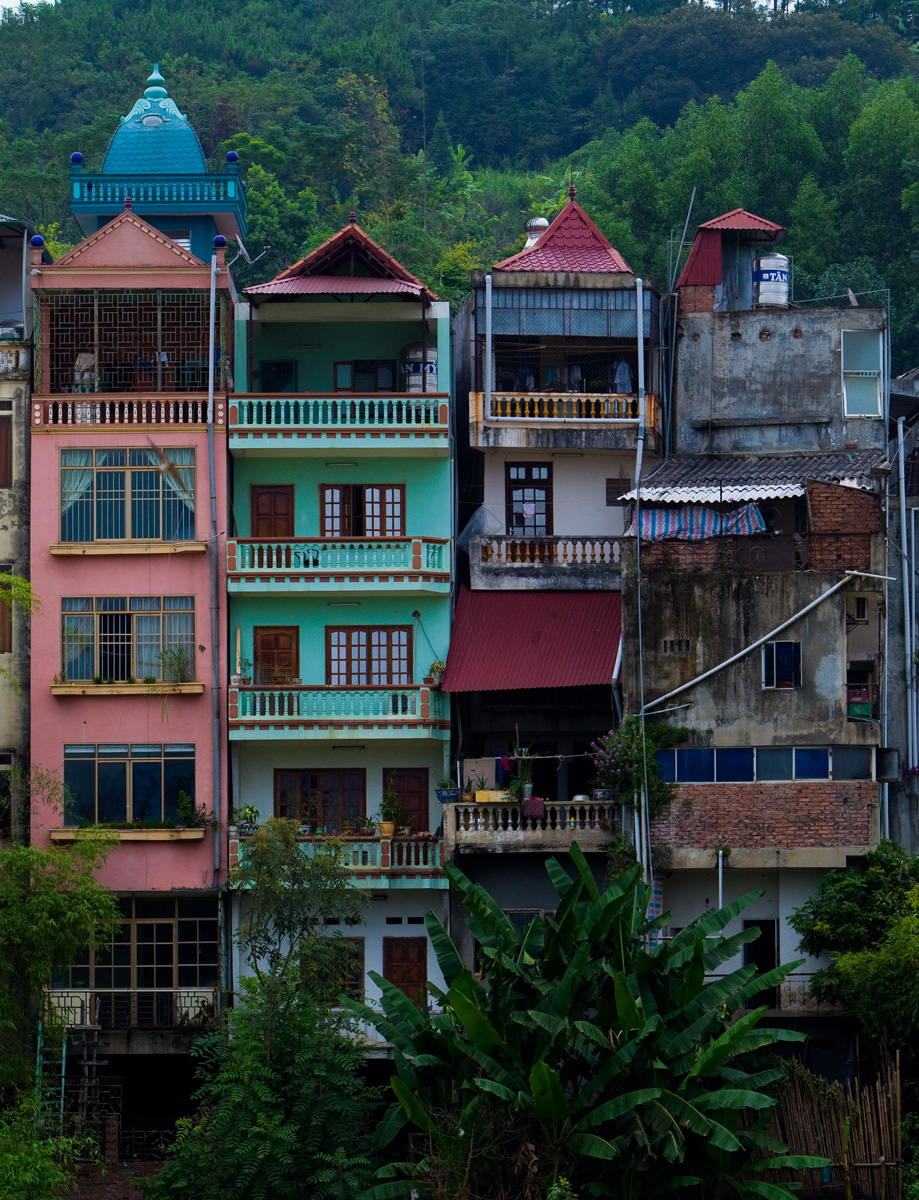

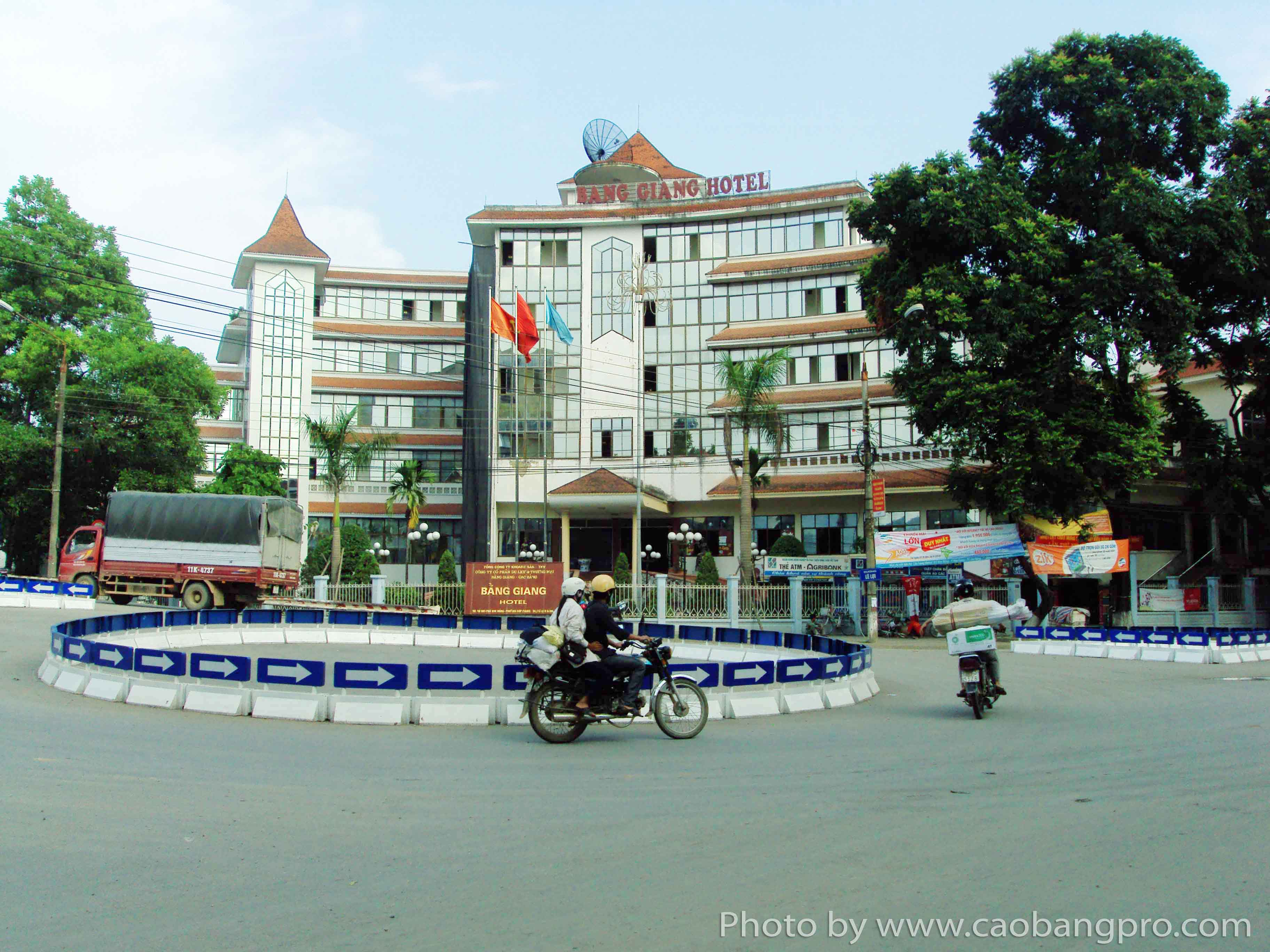

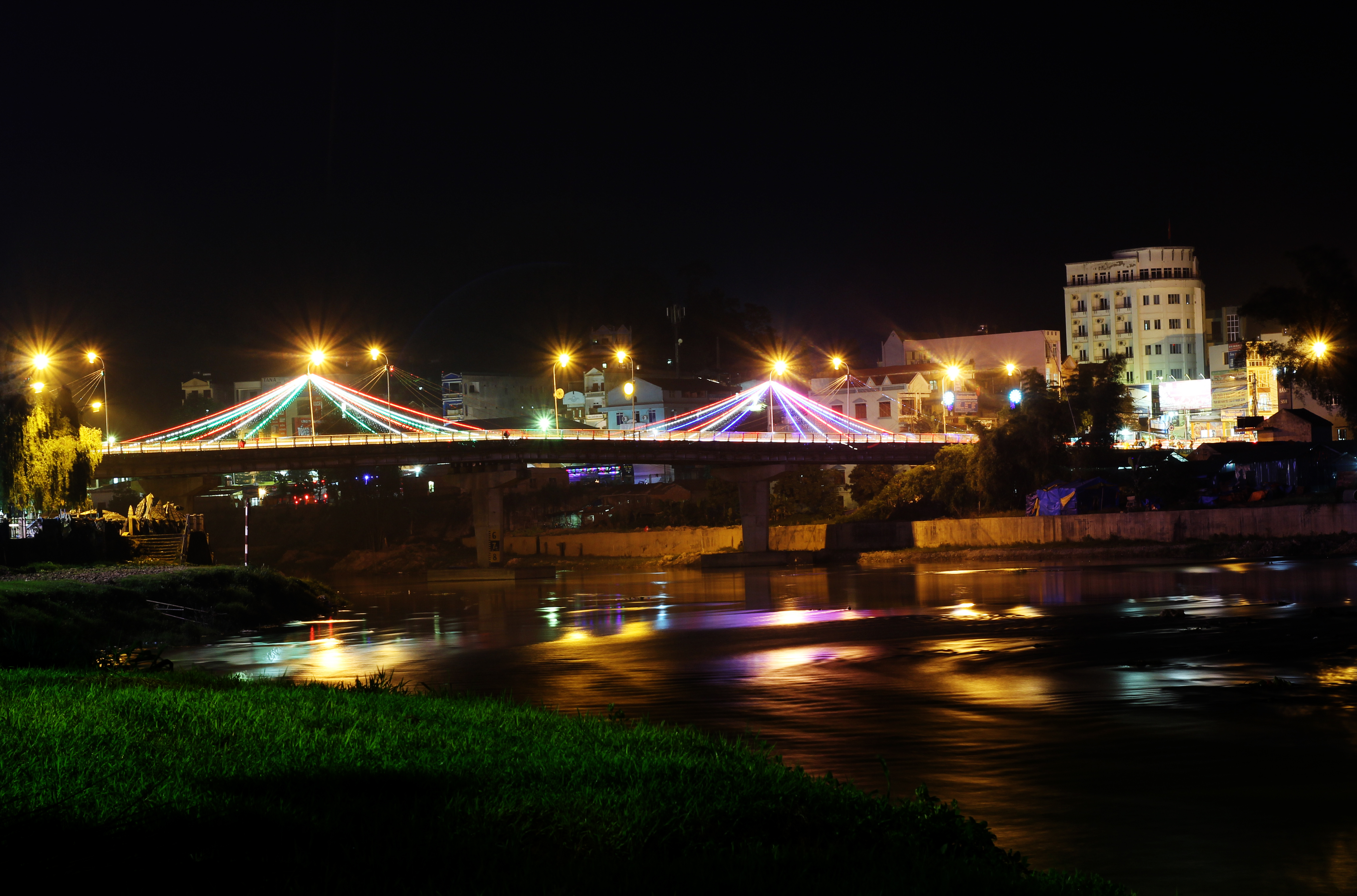

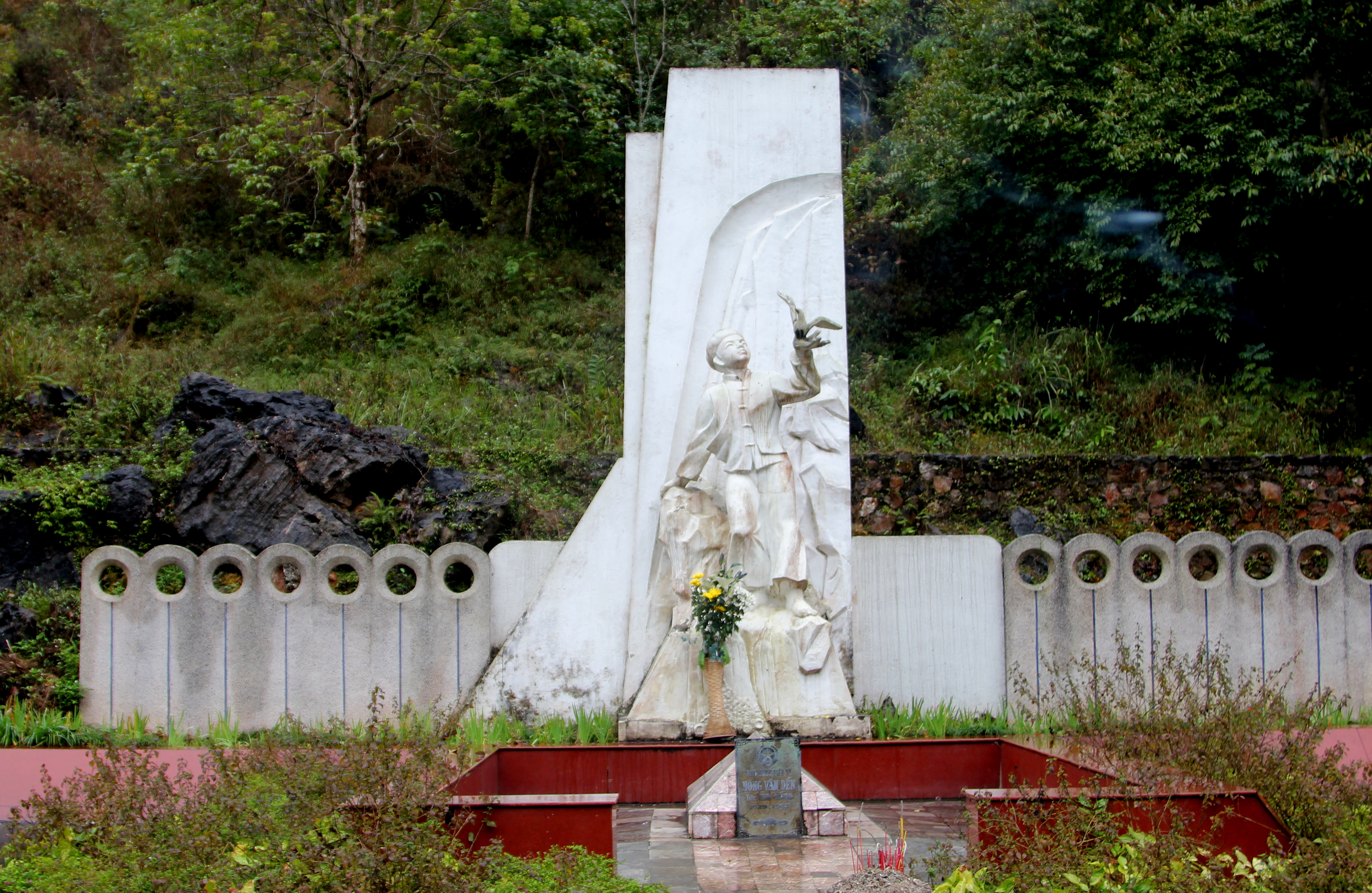

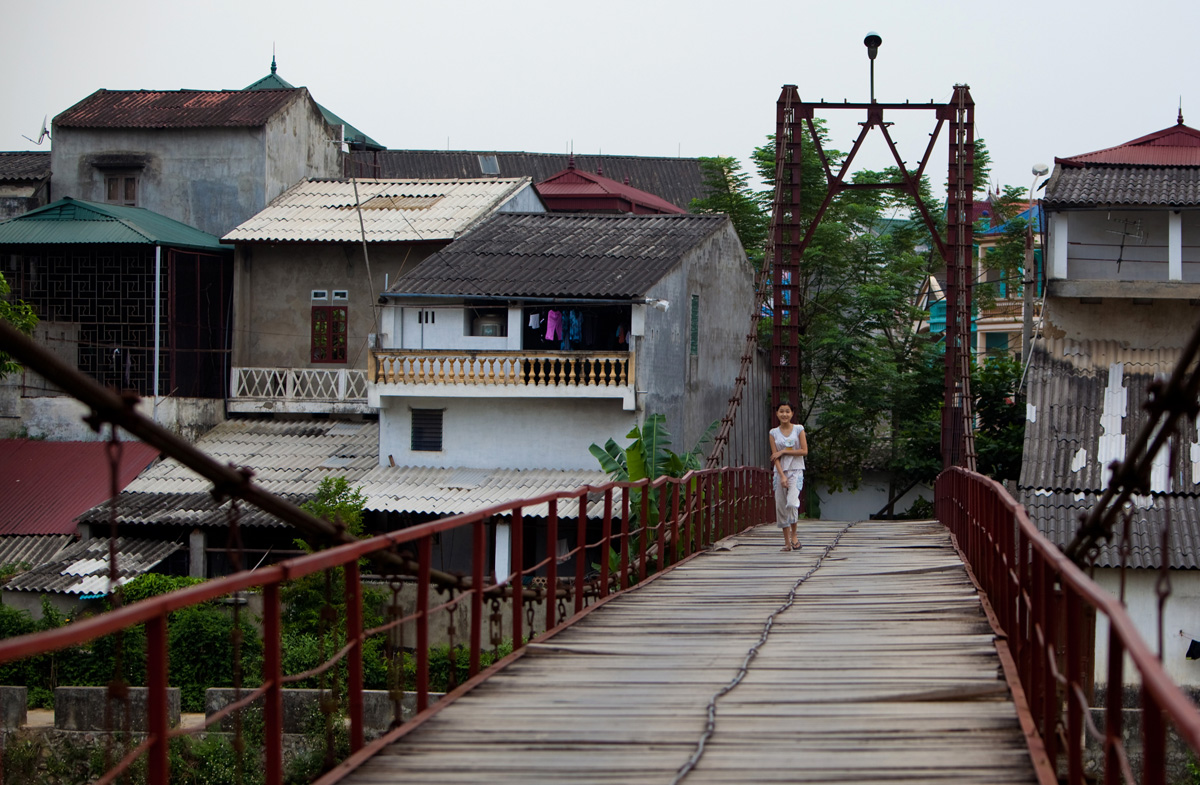

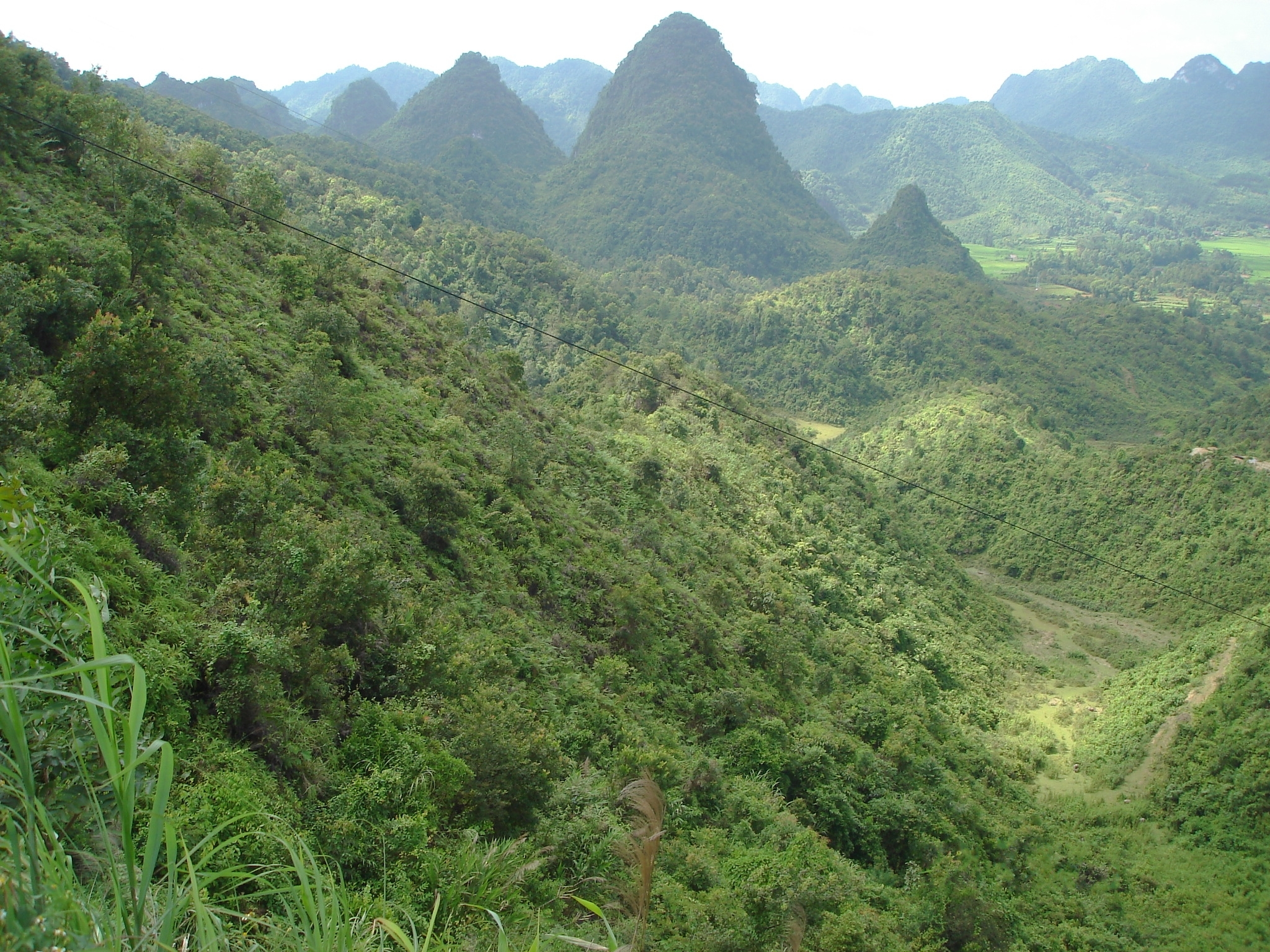

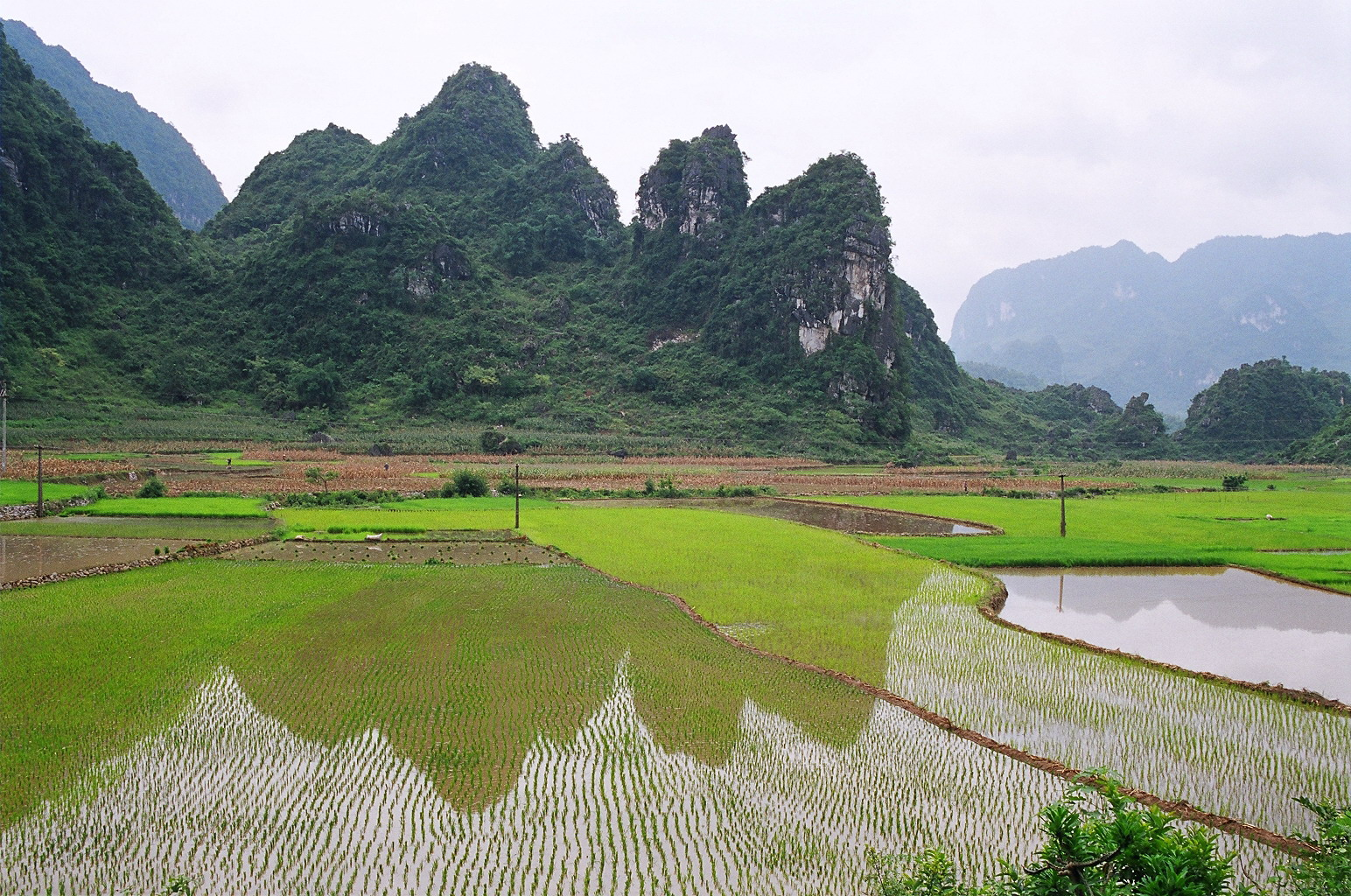

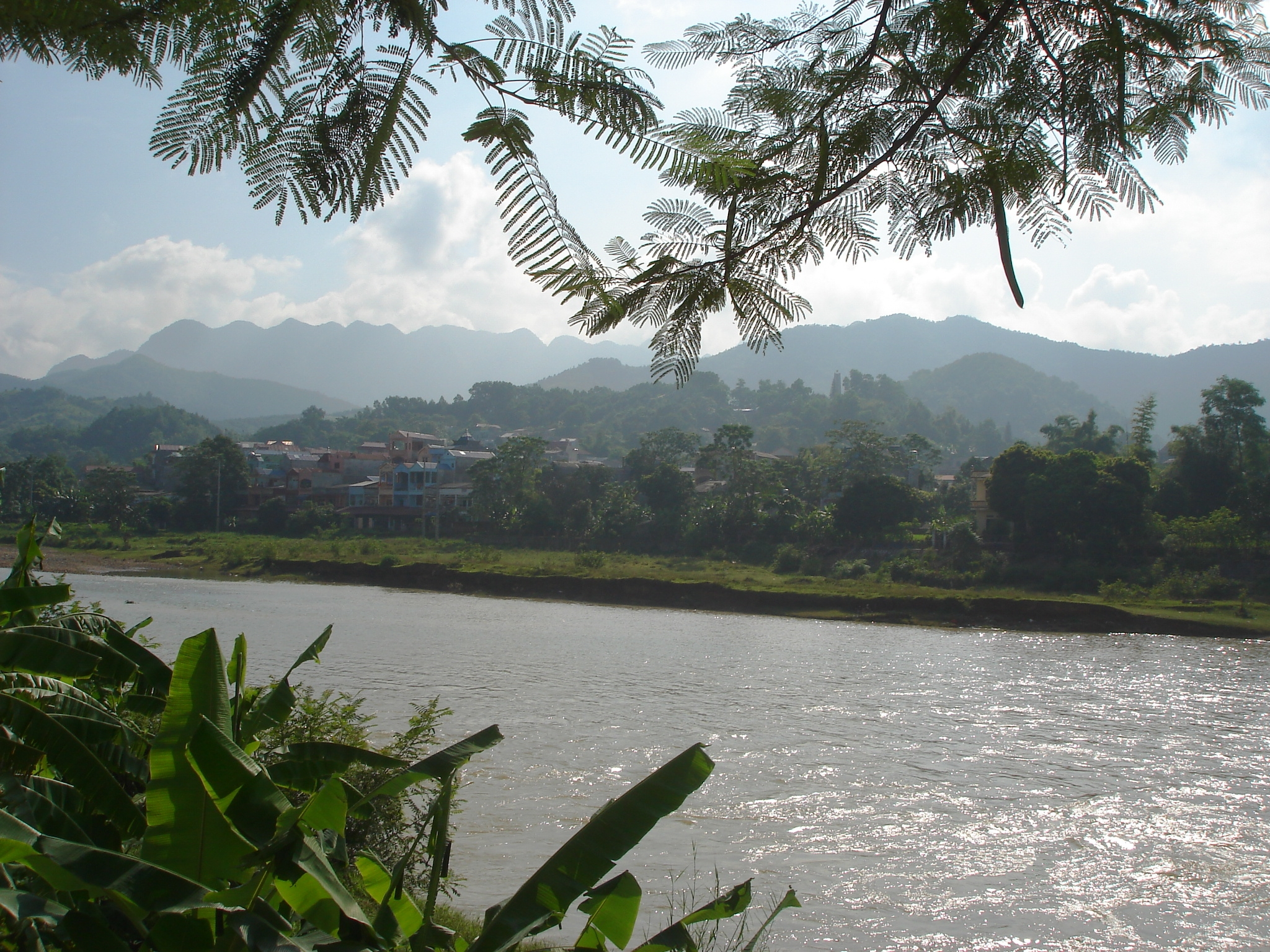

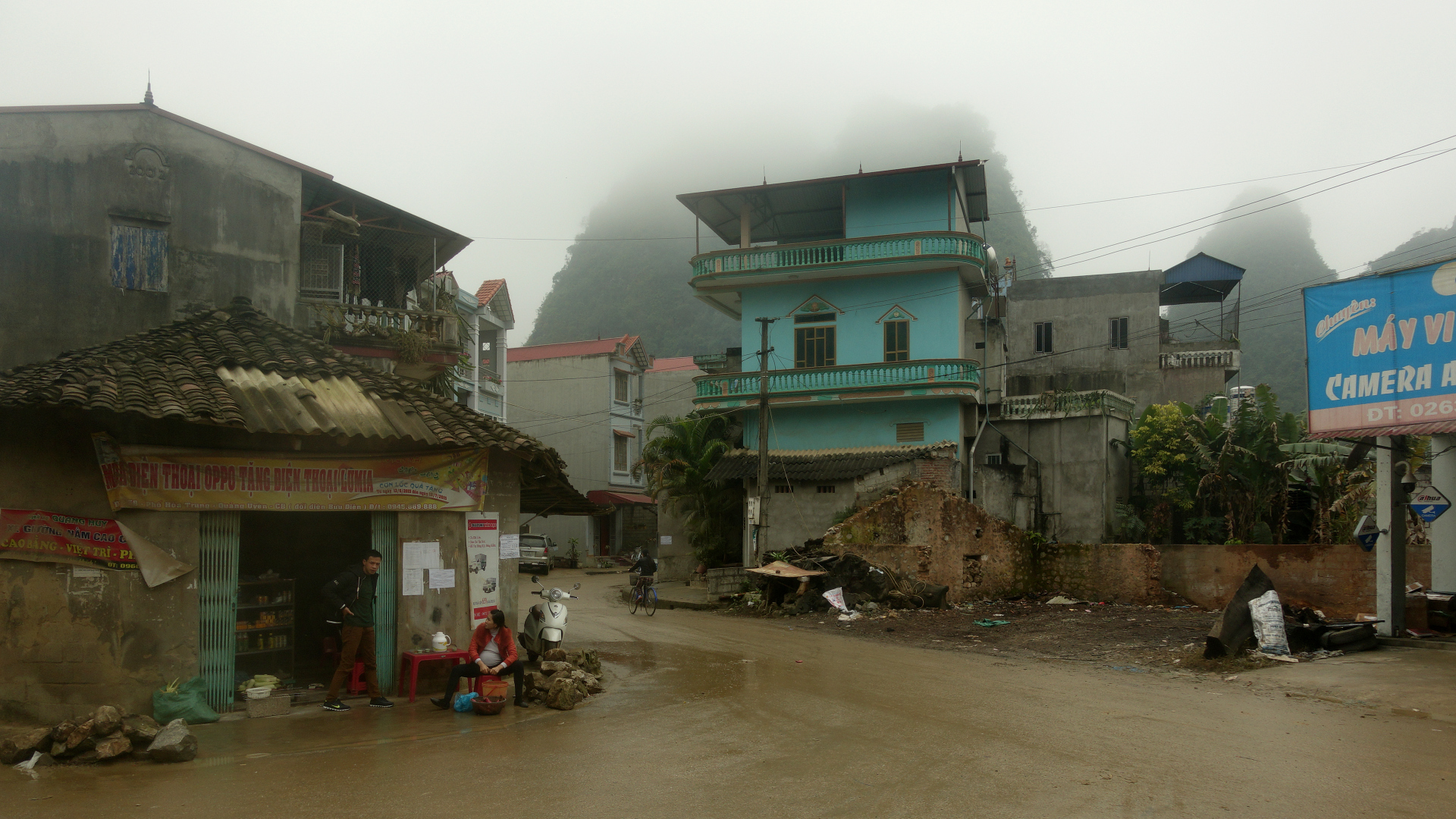

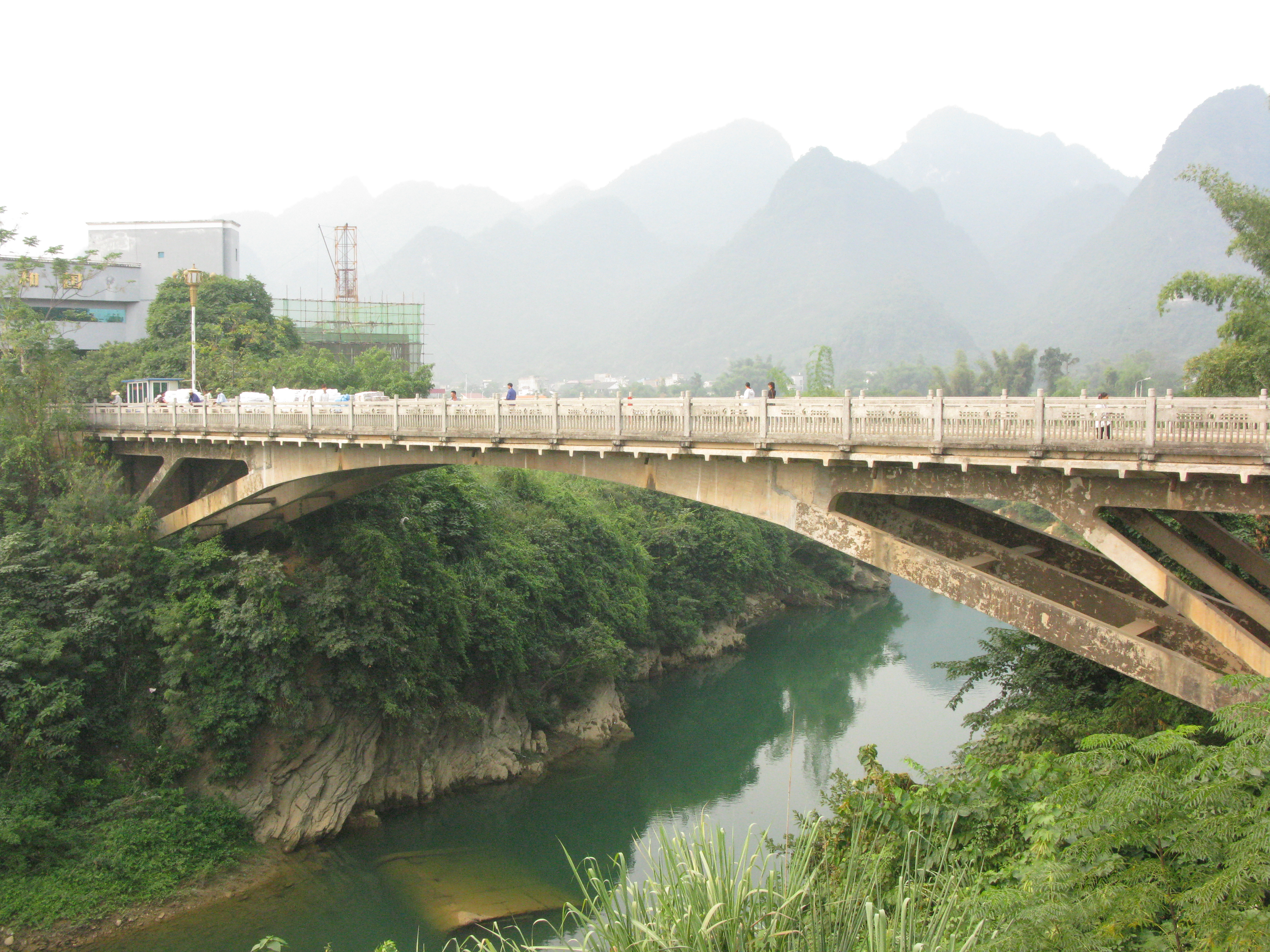

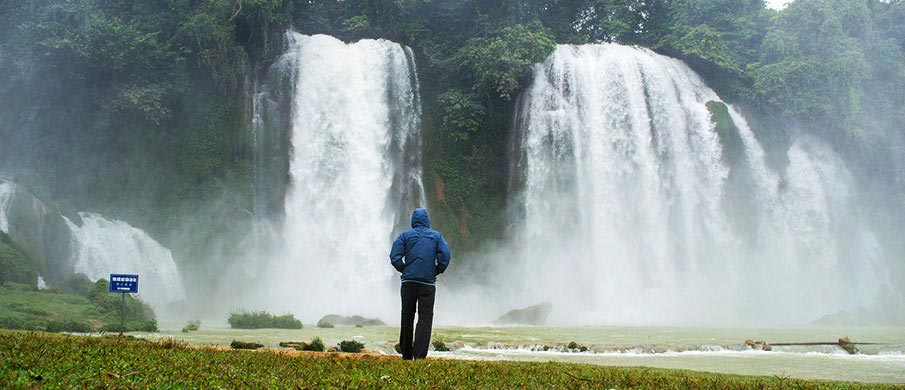
