= Northern Midland and Mountainous Regions =

Mountain area in Northern Vietnam

The Northern Midland and Mountainous Regions (Vietnamese: Trung du và miền núi phía Bắc / Bắc Bộ), known before 1954 as the Midland and Upstream, are the 'mountainous and midland regions' of Northern Vietnam (Vietnamese: Bắc Bộ); an umbrella term for the Northwest and Northeast regions of Vietnam.

Administration-wise, this region consists of 9 provinces: Cao Bằng, Lào Cai, Lạng Sơn, Tuyên Quang, Thái Nguyên, Phú Thọ, Lai Châu, Điện Biên, and Sơn La. The regional center of the region(s) primarily sits within the provinces of Phú Thọ, Tuyên Quang, and Thái Nguyên.

The Northern divided into 2 sub-regions:

- Northwest: Điện Biên, Lai Châu, Sơn La, Lào Cai.
- Northeast: Phú Thọ, Tuyên Quang, Cao Bằng, Lạng Sơn, Thái Nguyên.

Together being over 92,5 thousand km^{2}, the region is the largest in Vietnam, and accounted for 12.6 million people in 2024.

== Geography ==
=== Location ===
The Northern Midland and Mountainous Regions is bordered by 2 provinces of Southern China: Guangxi and Yunnan to the north; 3 provinces of Upper Laos: Phongsali, Luang Prabang, Hua Phan to the west; Red River Delta to the southeast; North Central Coast to the southwest; Gulf of Tonkin to the east.
