= Nong Zhigao rebellions =

11th Century battles between Vietnam and China

Nong Zhigao's movement in the Song dynasty

The Nong Zhigao rebellions were three uprisings in 1042, 1048, and 1052 led by the Zhuang/Tai Nùng leader Nong Zhigao (Zhuang language: Nungz Ciqgaoh; Chinese: 儂智高; pinyin: Nóng Zhìgāo, Vietnamese: Nùng Trí Cao) against the Viet kingdom of Đại Cồ Việt (968–1054) and the Song dynasty (960–1279) of China. Defeated in 1042 and 1048 by Đại Cồ Việt, Zhigao fled to Song territory where he tried to set up an independent kingdom by taking Guangzhou. He failed and was forced to flee to the Dali Kingdom in 1054. There are different accounts of his fate with some sources saying he was killed and handed over to the Song while others say he survived in Thailand. Some Zhuang people today claim descent from Nong Zhigao.

== Background ==
=== Zhuang, Nùng, and Tày ===
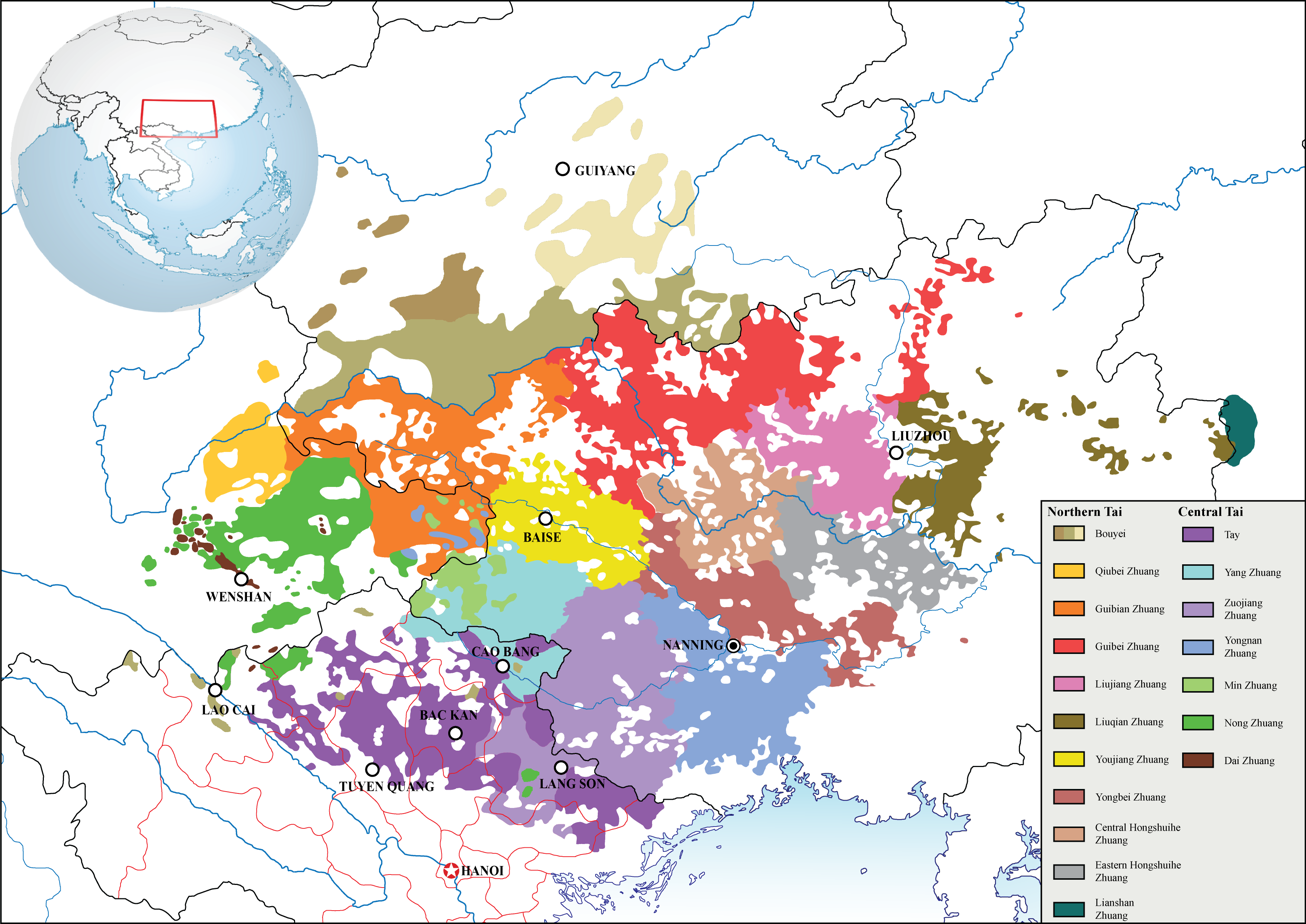
Geographic distribution of Nùng, Zhuang, Tay, Bouyei languages in northern Vietnam and southern China

The Zhuang, Nùng, and Tày people are a cluster of Tai peoples with very similar customs and dress known as the Rau peoples. In China, The Zhuang are today the largest non-Han Chinese minority with around 14.5 million population in Guangxi Province alone. In Vietnam, as of 1999, there were 933,653 Nùng people and 1,574,822 Tày people. Recently the Tày and Nùng have been referred to as a combined Tày-Nùng minority. However these ethnonyms were not used during the time period of Nong Zhigao's rebellions. They are products of the modern age. According to Keith Taylor, the Vietnamese terms were "categories of French colonial knowledge" used to differentiate highlanders from lowlanders. The ethnic Zhuang was a product of the "ethnic identification project" pursued in 1950s China. According to Fei Xiaotong, the leader of the project, the people now classified as Zhuang referred to themselves as "Han who speak the Zhuang language." In one case, a student who had previously identified as Han Chinese had to be taught that he was Zhuang.

In the early 11th century, ethnic identities and boundaries of rule were far more fluid than they are today in the frontier region lying along what is now the Sino-Vietnamese border. But the dominant ethnic group at that time was largely the same as the largest minority still found there, the Zhuang/Nung, who now number more than 15 million people. Identified in China as the Zhuang, and in Vietnam as the Nung, they are usually referred to as the Zhuang/Nung.

— Jeffrey G. Barlow

By the Tang dynasty (618–907), the Zhuang lived in mountain valleys called dongs (洞, lit. cave or hole/grotto settlements). The dongs were ruled by clan chieftains with absolute control over land distribution. The name of the leading clan was applied to their dependents. The Zhuang were considered warlike, feared for their poison coated weapons and armored elephants, and the dominant Huang clan rebelled against Tang authority from 756 to 824. Their leaders called themselves such names as Zhong Yue Wang (Middle Yue King), Nan Hai Wang (South Sea King), or Nan Yue Wang (South Yue King). Occasionally the Zhuang allied with other people such as the Viets in 820 and Nanzhao in 861.

The distance-technique of the rebels was to use a barbarian shield and spears. One man carried the shield which covered the body and the other two threw spears from behind the shield and killed. When they advanced thusly, arrows had no efficacy. They came on like a southern fire.

— Huang Xianfan, a general who fought against Nong Zhigao

=== Rise of the Nong clan ===
During the Song dynasty, the Huang clan was left in charge of the You and Zuo rivers. They participated in the Song–Đại Cồ Việt war as Song allies. The Wei had settled on the Song-Viet border. However the power of the Nong clan increased and began to upset Huang supremacy. By the early Song, they ruled over an area known as Temo, which stretched from modern Wenshan Zhuang and Miao Autonomous Prefecture in the west to Jingxi, Guangxi in the east and Guangyuanzhou (Quảng Nguyên, now Cao Bằng province) in the south. Emperor Taizong of Song (r. 976–997) bestowed special favors on Nong leadership, acknowledging that they had succeeded the Huang in the Zuo River region.

The Guangyuan zhou Man-barbarian Nong clan came from the south west... of Yongzhou and held the districts there. The terrain was steep mountains and inaccessible valleys; it produced gold and cinnabar. A good many people lived there. They wore their hair long and fastened their clothes on the left. They loved to fight and struggle and regarded death lightly. Earlier the leaders were of the Wei, Huang, Zhou and Nong clans which were constantly contending and pillaging each other.... The Huang clan offered pledges and 13 Bu-districts and 29 Man-barbarian Zhou-districts were established.

— History of Song

The first member of the Nong clan to gain official recognition was Nong Minfu. It is not known when he was born, but a memorial in early 977 states that the "peaceful and generous" leader Nong Minfu of Guangyuanzhou had established himself over ten neighboring villages with the support of Southern Han (907–971). Minfu had supported Duan Siping (r. 937–944) of the Dali Kingdom and was rewarded with titles. Duan rewarded another leader in Temo with the title buxie. The Song bestowed the titles "minister of works" (sigong) and "grand master of splendid happiness bearing the golden pocket with purple trimming" (jinzi guanglu daifu) on Minfu. These titles were passed onto Minfu's son, Nong Quanfu (Zhuang: Nungz Cienzfuk, Vietnamese: Nùng Tồn Phúc). He was also granted additional authority of Dangyouzhou (modern Jingxi, Guangxi). His younger brother, Nong Quanlu, controlled Wennaizhou (modern Na Rì District). Such preferential treatment was viewed with anger in Đại Cồ Việt, which attacked a Song garrison in 1004 after the garrison held a banquet for a Nong chieftain.

In 1005, a woman known as A Nong was born to a notable warrior chieftain who accepted titles from both the Song dynasty and the Early Lê dynasty of Đại Cồ Việt. A Nong learned to spin and weave from her mother. At some point she was separated from the other girls and learned the ways of a shaman. She married Nong Quanfu and became his primary political adviser. Her brother, Nong Dangdao, inherited Wulezhou near Guangyuanzhou. She gave birth to Nong Zhigao in 1025. A Nong induced Quanfu to kill his brother, the leader of the Cen clan, and take his lands. The Nong clan eventually controlled 14 major dongs in comparison to only 5 for the Huang clan.

In 1035, Quanfu declared the founding of the Kingdom of Longevity (Changsheng Guo 長生國) and took for himself the exalted title "Luminous and Sage Emperor" (Zhaosheng Huangdi 昭聖皇帝) while A Nong became the "Enlightened and Virtuous Empress" (Mingde Huanghou 明德皇后). Another source says he founded the Chang Qi Guo and styled himself the first king of Dali, Tu Dan Chao. The local prefect of Tianzhou requested assistance from Yongzhou to deal with the rebellion, but officials there appear to have feared involvement and refused to offer aid. In 1039, the emperor of the Lý dynasty, Lý Thái Tông, invaded the newly found kingdom, captured Quanfu and four other male members of the Nong clan, and executed them. A Nong escaped with the 14-year old Zhigao into Song territory.

Once I had come to possess All under Heaven (thiên hạ), all of my generals, ministers, and officials led a great celebration. From all foreign lands and special regions, there was no one who did not attend. Furthermore, according to precedent, the Nùng clan for generations has protected our frontier, and they have frequently come to court bearing tribute. Today, Tồn Phúc is displaying a great arrogance by illicitly adopting a reign title and by issuing edicts. His followers are gathering like swarms of gadflies, and he has spread poisonous ideas among the borderlands people. With Heaven's authority, I will strike out and punish him. I have made five members of that group, Tồn Phúc among them, outlaws, and I will have them beheaded at the capital.

— Lý Thái Tông

== Rebellions ==
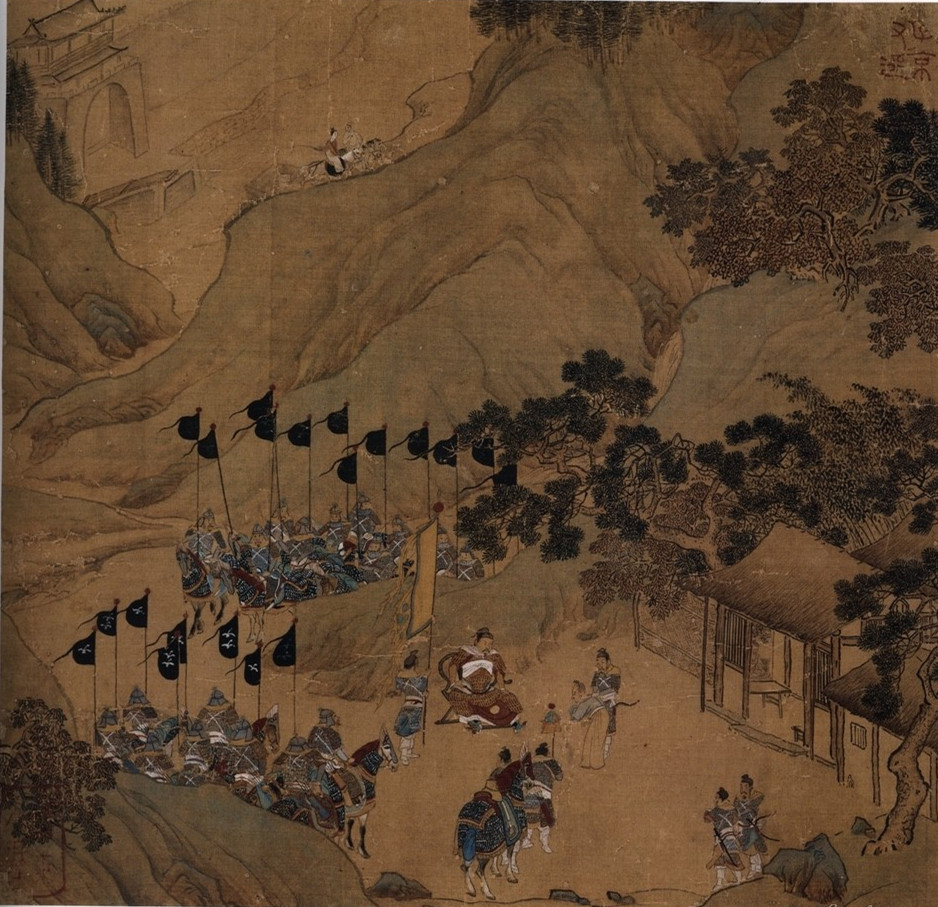
Depiction of "Nong Zhigao Crossing the Border", Ming dynasty, 15th century

=== Đại Cồ Việt ===
In 1041, Nong Zhigao and his mother seized Dangyouzhou (modern Jingxi, Guangxi) and the Leihuo dong settlement (modern Daxin County). A Nong married a wealthy merchant but Zhigao murdered this man. A Nong married a third time to Nong Xiaqing, expanding their territory further into Temo. Chinese historical records state that in 1042, Zhigao declared the founding of the Kingdom of the Great Succession (Dali Guo 大歷國 Đại Lịch, not to be confused with the Kingdom of Dali 大理 Đại Lí) and received recognition from the Dali Kingdom, which assigned him an administrative position, while the Vietnamese historical record Đại Việt sử ký toàn thư dated it to 1041. Following the secession of Nong Zhigao in that same year (1041 or 1042), Đại Cồ Việt sent troops and captured him. He was held prisoner for a year before he was released with an honorary title and given control of Guangyuan, Leihuo, Ping'an, Pinpo, and Silang in return for a share of their natural resources, particularly gold. In 1048, Zhigao declared another state, the Kingdom of the Southern Heavens (Nantian Guo), and took a reign title, "Auspicious Circumstances" (Jingrui). He called the Viet court's actions criminal and that his territory would not be annexed by China. In the fall of 1049, Zhigao's forces pillaged Yongzhou. In 1050, Đại Cồ Việt launched an attack on Zhigao's stronghold and evicted him, sending him fleeing into Song territory.

=== Song dynasty ===
Nong Zhigao approached the Song at Yongzhou for assistance but was denied an audience until he staged a military demonstration beneath the walls. He then presented substantial tribute (tame elephants and lumps of gold and silver) and petitioned the emperor. The prefect of Yongzhou, Chen Gong, never passed on the petition to court. However, when the tribute reached the court, the Fiscal Commissioner Xiao Gu argued to the emperor that Zhigao should be granted title. The Song court refused because it considered Zhigao's service to be the right of Đại Cồ Việt. The military commander Yuan Yun was dispatched to attack Zhigao but instead he wanted to offer Zhigao protection, and returned to the capital with tribute, arguing for a change in policy.

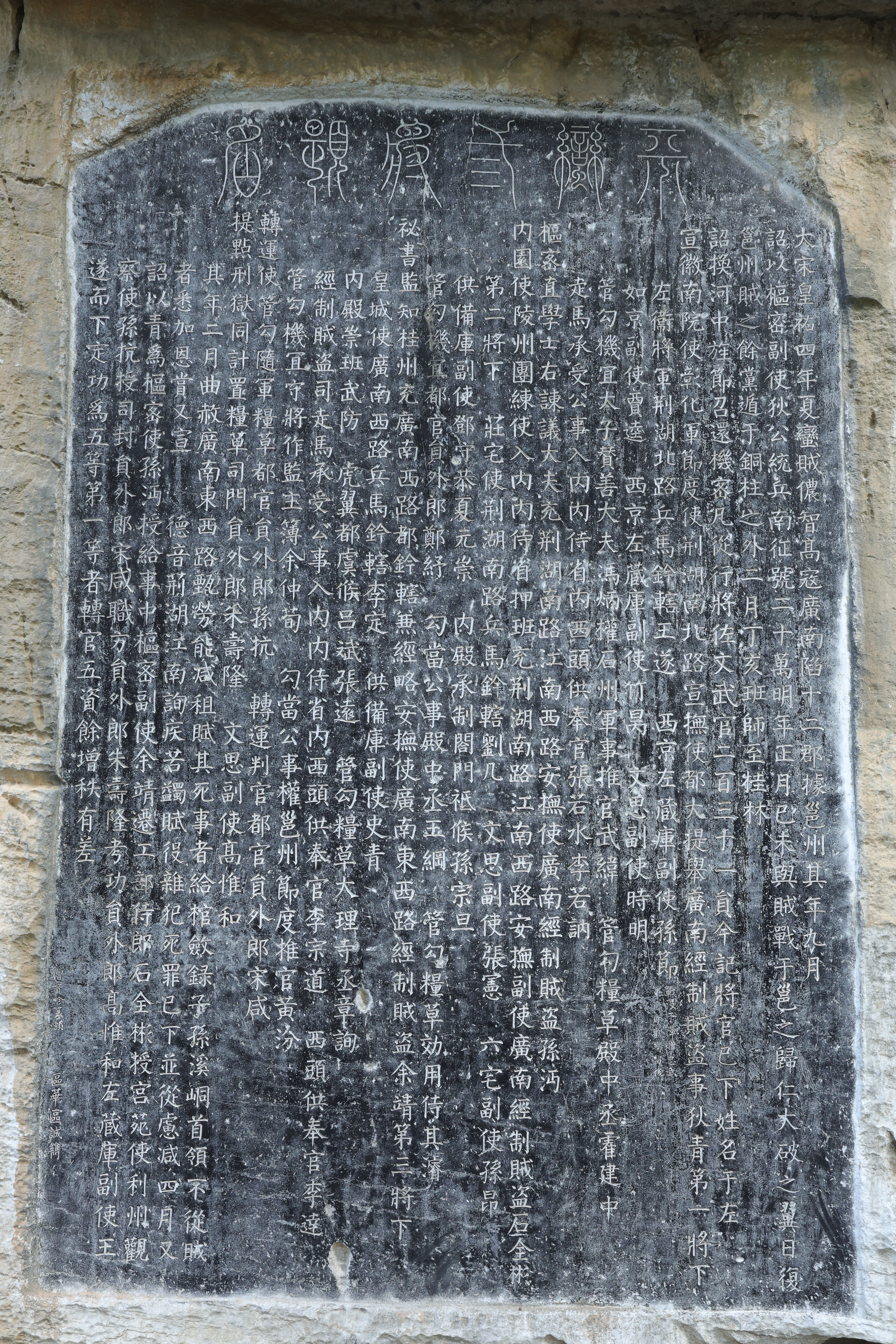
Inscription of Di Qing, Yu Jing, and Shi Quanbin, commemorating the Song victory against Zhigao's rebellion

Zhigao's followers set up shop and through the mineral wealth of his holdings formed close ties with Chinese traders, including jinshi degree holders Huang Wei and Huang Shifu. He also recruited other Nong clan members such as Nong Zhizhong and Nong Jianhou. Under the influence of Huang Wei and A Nong, Zhigao decided to declare independence. In 1052, Zhigao proclaimed the establishment of the Kingdom of the Great South (Danan Guo) and granted himself the title of Benevolent and Kind Emperor (Renhui Huangdi). Later he proclaimed the restoration of the kingdom of Nanyue. In the spring of 1052, Zhigao ordered the villages under his control to be burnt and led 5,000 subjects on the path to Guangzhou. By summertime, he had taken Yongzhou and reached Guangzhou, where his 50,000 strong army became bogged down in a prolonged siege. Despite cutting off Guangzhou from water, the city was well stocked with provisions, and the defenders fought back with crossbow defenses. The district magistrate Xiao Zhu foiled a waterborne attack on Guangzhou by setting fire to their ships. After 57 days, Zhigao was forced to retreat as more Song reinforcements arrived. He held out at Yongzhou, defeating five Song commanders sent against him. The Song called in a veteran of the Song–Xia wars, Di Qing, to assume command of the anti-rebel forces. He gathered 31,000 men and 32 generals, including Fanluo tribal cavalry from the northwest that "were able to ascend and descend mountains as though walking on level ground." Lý Thái Tông also offered to send 20,000 troops but the offer was refused out of fear that the troops would not leave afterwards.

As for all the belongings that you amassed during your lives, they were destroyed today by heaven's fire. You have nothing to live on, and you are considered poor indeed! You must grab Yongzhou and capture Guangzhou where I will establish myself as its ruler. If you don't do this, you will necessarily die.

— Nong Zhigao

One general, Chen Shu, attacked early with 8,000 men and suffered a defeat against the Zhuang forces. Di Qing executed him and 31 officers. He then marched his forces under cover of night and blocked the Kunlun Pass east of Yongzhou. Zhigao attacked the Song forces in early 1054. The Zhuang wore bright crimson uniforms and fought in units of three armed with long shields that advanced "like fire." In the initial stages of battle, one Song commander was killed, and the Song army was momentarily forced to fall back. In the second engagement, the Zhuang forces could not withstand the Song infantry charges. The Song infantry hacked at the Zhuang shields with heavy swords and axes while the Fanluo cavalry attacked their wings, breaking their ranks. The Zhuang fled, suffering 5,341 casualties. Di Qing retook Yongzhou and executed the jinshi-holder Huang, two of Zhigao's family, and 57 officials. Zhigao and his remaining family fled to seek help from the Zhuang clans, but he was not well liked, and the Huang chieftain, Huang Shouling, refused to aid him. Both the Huang and Cen clans had suffered depredations from the Nong. He also requested aid from the Viet court, which sent the tribal commander Võ Nhị to assist the rebels. A Nong and her son Nong Zhiguang, as well as Zhigao's sons Nong Jifeng and Nong Jizong, were caught at Temo in Yunnan by Zhuang forces allied with the Song. They were executed. Zhigao failed to raise more troops in Dali.

== Aftermath ==
According to the Zizhi Tongjian, Nong Zhigao was executed by the ruler of Dali and his head presented to Song authorities. The History of Song says that his death cannot be known. Popular accounts claim he fled further south into modern northern Thailand, where his descendants thrive to this day. The Zhuang of Wenshan Zhuang and Miao Autonomous Prefecture identify as survivors of Zhigao's rebel movement and other groups in Dali City, Xishuangbana, and northern Thailand claim to be descended from Zhigao. Many Zhuang songs refer to him as "King Nong" (Vangz Nong).

The Song took full control of the Zuo and You rivers, incorporating the regions into the Song bureaucracy. When Zhigao and his fellow rebel chieftains fled, they were replaced by Song-allied clans, primarily the Huang and Cen who were given hereditary posts. Chinese schools in Zhuang areas were set up and the sons of elite Zhuang who enrolled in them later took posts in the Song bureaucracy. Chinese style dress began to influence the Zhuang, who started buttoning their clothing on the right, women wearing bodices, giving up trousers for skirts, and wearing their hair in the Chinese style. Many of the former rebels were enlisted in the Song army, which paid for more than 50,000 Zhuang troops known as Tuding from 1064 to 1067. Although they fought for the Song, they only obeyed the orders of their Zhuang chieftains.

Although the Song court's early attention to the frontier leaders was largely symbolic, by the time of Song Shenzong (r. 1065–85), "local militia" (tuding) were being actively organized among the aboriginal villages so as to provide the first line of defense for the Chinese empire. Wang Anshi would comment in an essay on the administration of the Yong frontier command that the aboriginal communities of the Left and Right rivers should be relied upon for the security of both Guangxi and Guangdong.

— James A. Anderson

== Legacy ==
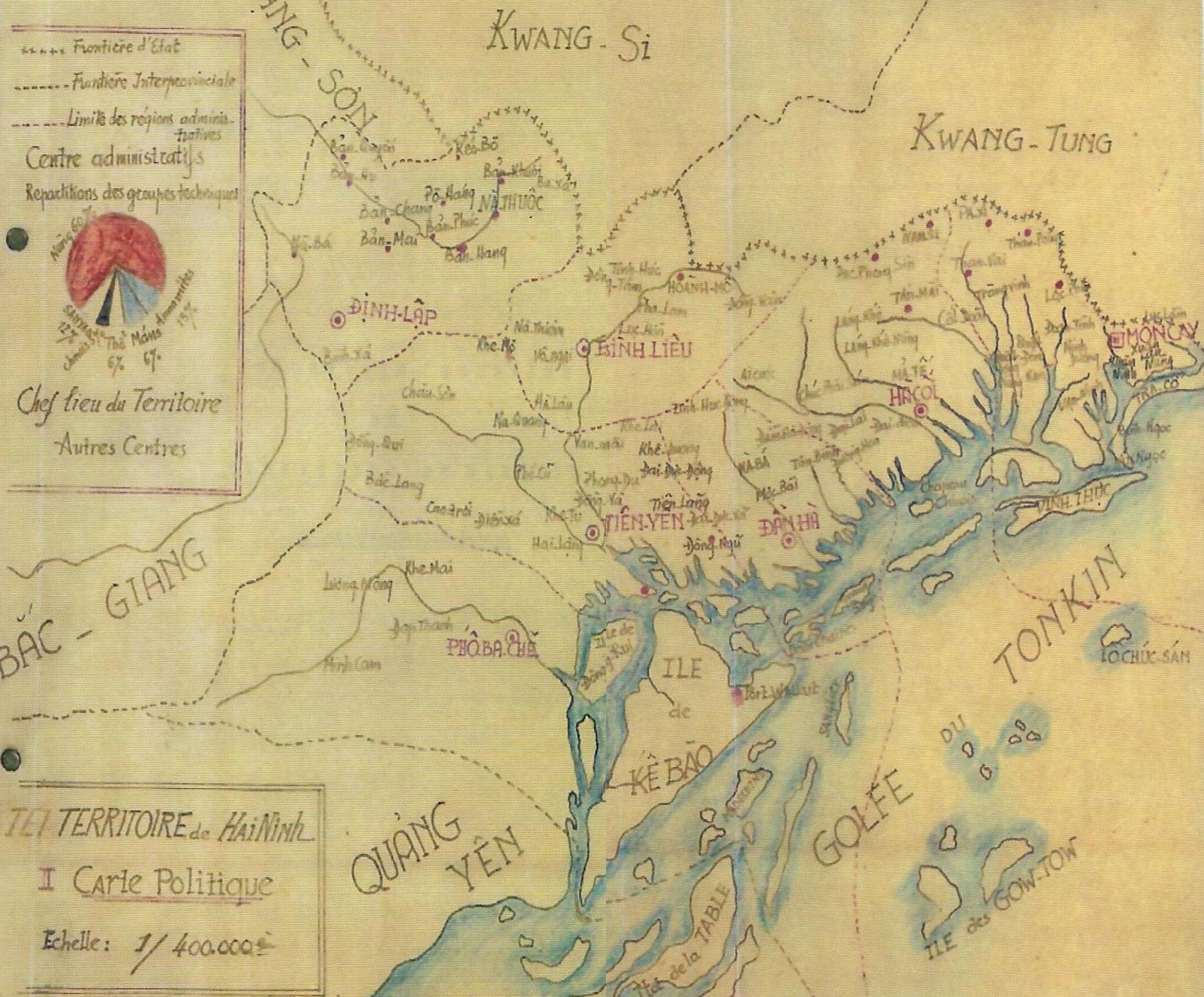
Map of the Nùng Autonomous Territory, 1950s

Nong Zhigao (V. Nùng Trí Cao) is revered by Tai-speaking communities in Guangxi and Cao Bằng. Many families with the Nong (V. Nùng) surname claim descent from Nong Zhigao and sponsor public displays of pride in the 11th century leader through temples and monuments. There is more evidence of the celebration of Nong Zhigao in Cao Bằng than in Guangxi, especially prior to the modern era, after which the local leader was inserted into nationalist histories as though he were a citizen of China or Vietnam.

=== China ===
Historically the Song general Di Qing, who defeated the rebellion, was the one who was honored. In 1053, a large stele was erected by himself in Guilin to eulogize his deeds. The "suppressing the Man barbarian" (pingman) stele described Nong Zhigao as a barbarian bandit who committed crimes against Chinese officials. Local communities also constructed temples to commemorate those officials who died in the rebellion. There is little to no physical evidence of Nong Zhigao's commemoration in premodern China. However by the 18th century, certain communities in Guangxi did worship him. In 1956, a stele dating to 1706 was discovered in Tiandeng County. It commemorated the construction of the Zhongxiu Dujun Village Temple and describes how Nong Dalingshen Dianxia (His Highness Nùng the Great Spirit) became a lord, fought valiantly, and transformed into a spirit to protect the region. The primary patrons of the temple were the Huang, Lin and Zhao clans. After the defeat of Nong Zhigao, the Nong clan was forced to take the surname Zhao.

By the 1950s, Zhuang society in Guangxi was largely organized by lineages of zhixi (branches) such as the Nong, Sha, and Tu. In September 1952, the People's Republic of China recognized the Zhuang as a national minority and established the Guangxi Zhuang Autonomous Region. Zhuang ethnic consciousness arguably developed in the period afterwards as the region became more connected with other parts of China, especially the urban areas. Public events such as the springtime festival and song festival Sanyuesan (Sam Nyied Sam) were promoted by the government, but by the 1980s they had become more tourist attractions than a symbol of ethnic solidarity for the Zhuang. Zhuang scholars who wanted to promote Zhuang culture and writing mainly lived in the urban areas of Guangxi and Beijing while residents in rural areas were more concerned with poverty and jobs.

In the late 1970s, Nong Zhigao was rehabilitated as part of the government's liberalization policies for national minorities. In the early 1980s, Huang Xianfan's Nong Zhigao portrayed him as a Chinese leader at the center of a rich local history. After the Sino-Vietnamese War in 1979, Huang interpreted Nong Zhigao as local leader who fought against a corrupt Song court that refused to provide locals with protection from marauding bands from Đại Việt. The orthodox Dangdai Zhongguode Guangxi portrays Nong Zhigao as a Zhuang who rose up to protect Chinese borders from Vietnamese aggression. By the late 1980s, collections of folklore containing tales of Nong Zhigao's heroism had been published. On 8 January 1997, a group of Nong Zhigao's descendants in Jingxi erected a stele in honor of his birth. The site of the monument is supposedly where Nong Zhigao held his training grounds during his uprising. The Zhuang of Wenshan Zhuang and Miao Autonomous Prefecture identify as survivors of Nong Zhigao's rebel movement and other groups in Dali City, Xishuangbana, and northern Thailand claim to be descended from Nong Zhigao. Many Zhuang songs refer to him as "King Nong."

=== Vietnam ===
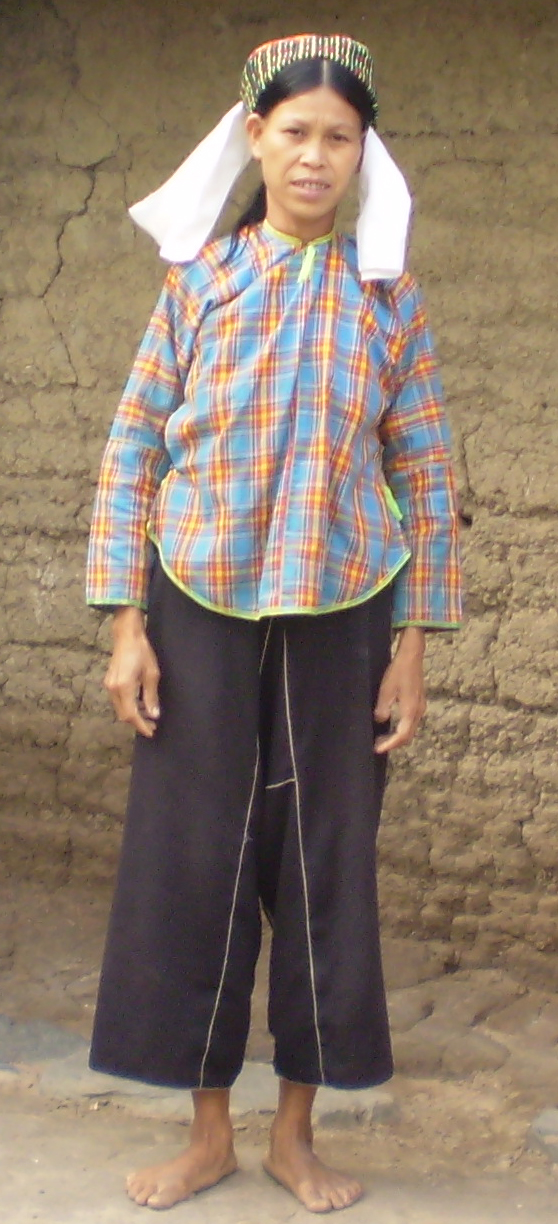
Nùng woman

After the end of the Song–Đại Việt war in 1078, the Nùng north of the border became more sinicized by accepting greater integration into the Chinese tributary system while the Tai-speaking people south of the border in Đại Việt remained in a patron-client relationship with the Viet court. These Tai-speaking communities lived in the mountainous areas of Việt Bắc and most of their interaction with Viets was through the Các Lái, Kinh (Vietnamese) merchants who had obtained government licenses for trade in the uplands in return for tribute to the court. Assimilation with broader society was not necessary unlike in China. The Viet court ruled the frontier region using a system similar to the Chinese Tusi known as thổ ty. Thổ ty officials who governed the frontier held hereditary positions and passed on their position from generation to generation. The thổ ty were de facto rulers and held absolute authority in their own areas. They paid tribute to both Chinese and Viet authorities. As late as the 19th century, imperial presence was not guaranteed. Central expansion and assertion of authority by the Nguyễn dynasty over these areas was often met by violent local opposition. Unlike the Chinese however, the Viets did offer princesses to the thổ ty to cement allegiances. Despite this, most Nùng communities were self ruled as late as 1953 when the Viet Minh took the Việt Bắc region.

As the strongest thổ ty, Nùng Trí Cao (C. Nong Zhigao) and his family members were deified by these communities. After the Lam Sơn uprising which ended the Ming occupation, the Viet ruler Lê Lợi consolidated support from border communities by acknowledging a variety of local deities. It's suggested that a shrine to Nùng Trí Cao, the Great King of Kỳ Sầm Temple, was erected in the western outskirts of Cao Bằng in connection to the suppression of a rebel force by Lê forces in 1431. Worship of Nùng Trí Cao was widespread by the 19th century. In 1897, it was reported that local leaders had arranged the renovation of Kỳ Sầm Temple in conjunction with the Nùng clan. On the tenth day of the first lunar month a festival was held around the temple. Apparently "Han Chinese" from the Qing dynasty flooded the region during the festival so that Quảng Nguyên "resembled nothing more than another region of China." Another festival focused on trade was held around the temple in the third lunar month during Thanh Minh (Qingming Festival).

The French colonizers of the Tonkin Protectorate saw the Nùng as potential converts to the colonial order and portrayed them as oppressed minorities who had suffered under Chinese and Viet rule. According to a 1908 military dispatch by Commandant LeBlond, they had been "subjugated and held ransom during many long centuries, sometimes by the one, sometimes by the other, the [Nùng] race has become flexible and is frequently able to ascertain the stronger [neighbor], to which it would turn instinctively. French domination appears soft to him and benevolent, compared with that of Annamites or the Chinese." During the Cần Vương movement to restore Viet independence, the Nùng showed little interest in supporting the lowland Kinh Viets against the French. Some of the upland peoples supported the Black Flag Army who fought against the French, while others sided with the French.

When the Indochinese Communist Party was founded in 1930, its policy suggested upland peoples and minorities should be given full autonomy once the French colonial order was overthrown, however such policy was given little attention until 1941 when support from these communities became a strategic necessity. The Nùng assisted Ho Chi Minh in his activities. As a result of anti-French activities, temples of Nùng Trí Cao were destroyed. The French had more success with the Tai Dón people along the Lao-border, who established a regime known as Sip Song Chau Tai under the control of collaborator Đèo Văn Long.

During the Vietnam War, Nùng villages in the Việt Bắc region received very little damage and avoided the devastation of upland communities in the Central Highlands. Although the Democratic Republic of Vietnam supervised state-sponsored migration to upland areas, the north did not experience a massive influx of Kinh Viets, so the ethnic balance around the Nùng Trí Cao temples remained fairly consistent. After the Sino-Vietnamese War, support for Nùng Trí Cao could be read as anti-Chinese, as he was mainly seen as a rebel against Chinese authority.

Five temples dedicated to Nùng Trí Cao remained active into the 20th century. The keepers of the Kỳ Sầm Temple all bear the surname Nùng. Although a romanized script has been created for the Nùng language, worshipers of the temple prefer Chinese, similar to the Zhuang in China, and sometimes Vietnamese. The Kỳ Sầm Temple was renovated sometime prior to 2001 to portray a more nationalistic image. The exterior and interior pillars of the temple have been retouched and the Chinese-character inscriptions at the front and Quốc ngữ inscriptions on the walls have been removed. References to "King Nùng" who had "raised high the banner proclaiming independence" have been replaced with floral patterns and pictures of horses, generic symbols associated with local heroes. A large sign indicates the temple as a historical landmark.

== Bibliography ==
- Anderson, James A. (2012) [2007], The Rebel Den of Nung Tri Cao: loyalty and identity along the Sino-Vietnamese frontier, University of Washington Press, ISBN 978-0-295-80077-6.
- ——— (1987), "The Zhuang Minority Peoples of the Sino-Vietnamese Frontier in the Song Period", Journal of Southeast Asian Studies, 18 (2): 250–269, doi:10.1017/s0022463400020543, JSTOR 20070970, S2CID 163042066.
- Ngô Sĩ Liên (1993). Đại Việt sử ký toàn thư (PDF) (in Vietnamese) (Nội các quan bản ed.). Hanoi: Social Science Publishing House, Volume I, Kỷ nhà Lê, Đại Hành Hoàng Đế
- Chaisingkananont, Somrak (2014). The Quest for Zhuang Identity: Cultural Politics of Promoting the Buluotuo Cultural Festival in Guangxi, China (Ph.D. thesis). National University of Singapore. hdl:10635/118867.
- Ng, Candice Sheung Pui (2011). "On "Constructed" Identities: A Dialogue on the Nature of Zhuang Identity". Journal of Oriental Studies. 44 (1/2): 45–61. JSTOR 44009390.
- Taylor, K. W. (2013). A History of the Vietnamese. Cambridge University Press. ISBN 978-0-521-87586-8.
