= Nùng people =

Central Tai ethnic group living in Northern Vietnam and Southwest Guangxi

Nùng
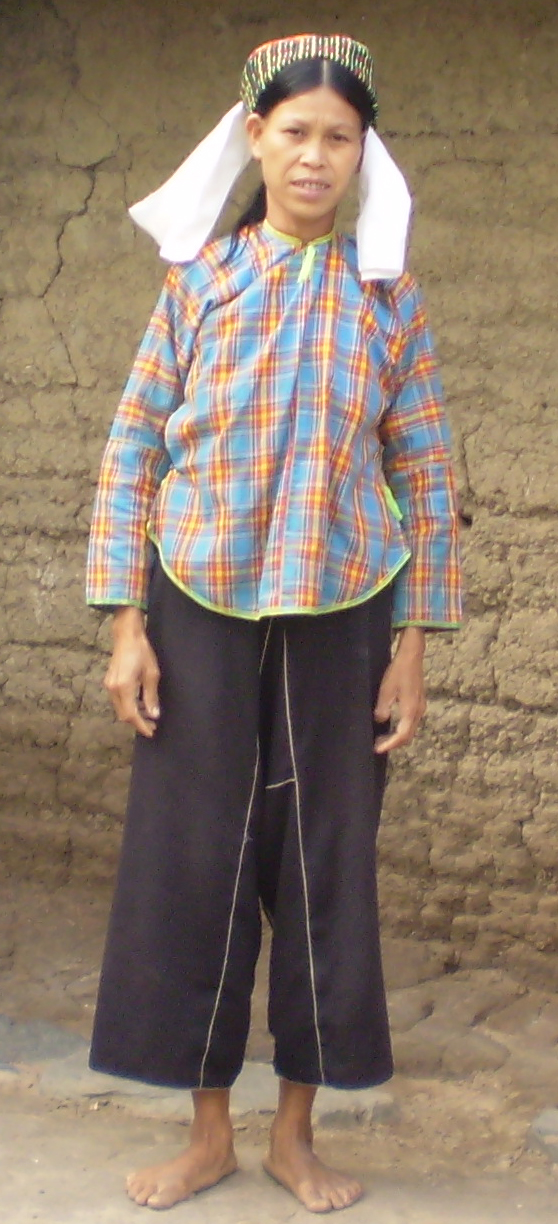
- A Nùng woman

Regions with significant populations
- Vietnam, China
- Vietnam: 1,083,298 (2019)
- China: unknown

Languages
- Nùng, Vietnamese, En

Religion
- Nùng folk religion

Related ethnic groups
- Zhuang people and Tày people

The Nùng (pronounced as [nuːŋ]) are a Central Tai-speaking ethnic group living primarily in northeastern Vietnam and southwestern Guangxi. The Nùng sometimes call themselves Thổ, which literally means 'autochthonous' (indigenous or native to the land). Their ethnonym is often mingled with that of the Tày as Tày-Nùng. According to the Vietnam census, the population of the Nùng numbered about 856,412 by 1999, 968,800 by 2009, and 1,083,298 by 2019. They are the third largest Tai-speaking group, preceded by the Tày and the Thái (Black Tai, White Tai and Red Tai groups), and sixth overall among national minority groups.

They are closely related to the Tày and the Zhuang. In China, the Nùng together with the Tày are classified as Zhuang people.

== Subdivisions ==
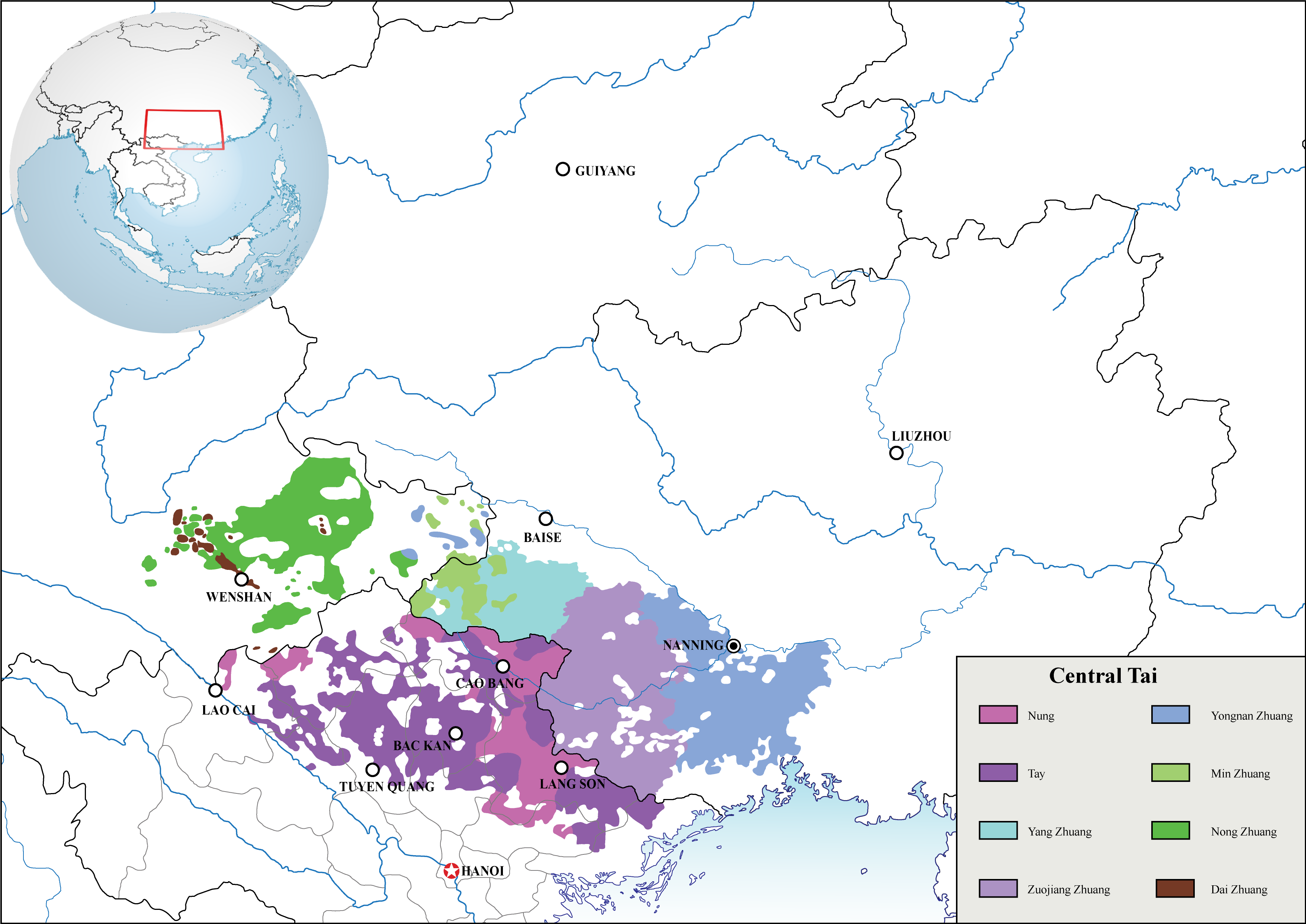
Geographic distribution of the Nùng as a part of Central Tai speaking peoples

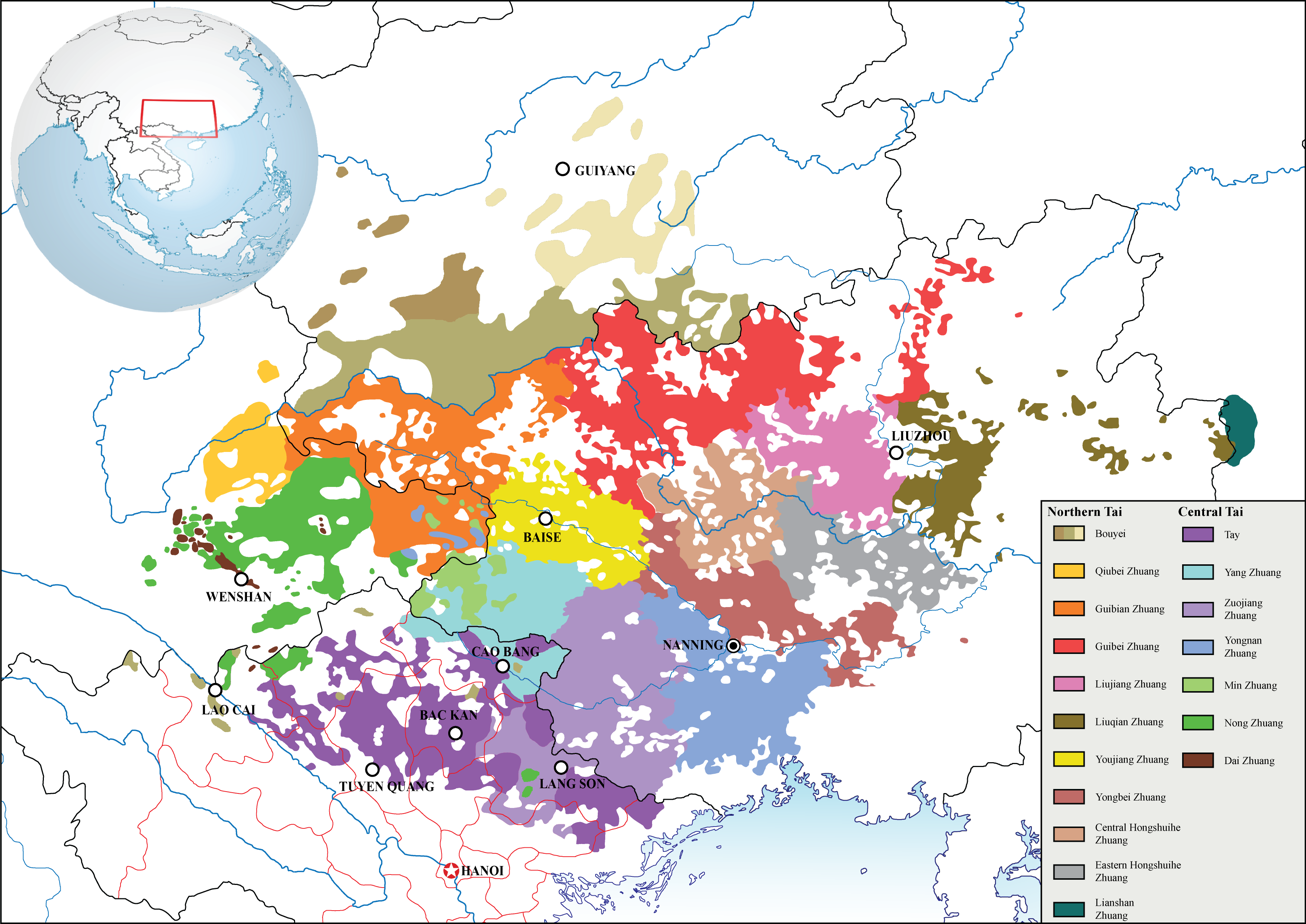
Geographic distribution of Nùng, Zhuang, Tay, Bouyei languages in northern Vietnam and southern China.

There are several subgroups among the Nùng: Nùng Xuồng, Nùng Giang, Nùng An, Nùng Phàn Slình, Nùng Lòi, Nùng Cháo, Nùng Quý Rỉn, Nùng Dín, Nùng Inh, Nùng Tùng Slìn etc.

Many of the Nùng's sub-group names correspond to the geographic regions of the Nùng homeland. Hoàng Nam (2008:11) lists the following Nùng subgroups.

- Nùng Inh: migrated from Long Ying
- Nùng Phàn Slình: migrated from Wan Cheng
  - Nùng Phàn Slình thua lài
  - Nùng Phàn Slình cúm cọt
- Nùng An: migrated from An Jie
- Nùng Dín
- Nùng Lòi: migrated from Xia Lei
- Nùng Tùng Slìn: migrated from Cong Shan
- Nùng Quý Rỉn: migrated from Gui Shun
- Nùng Cháo: migrated from Long Zhou

== Relationship to the Zhuang and Tày ==
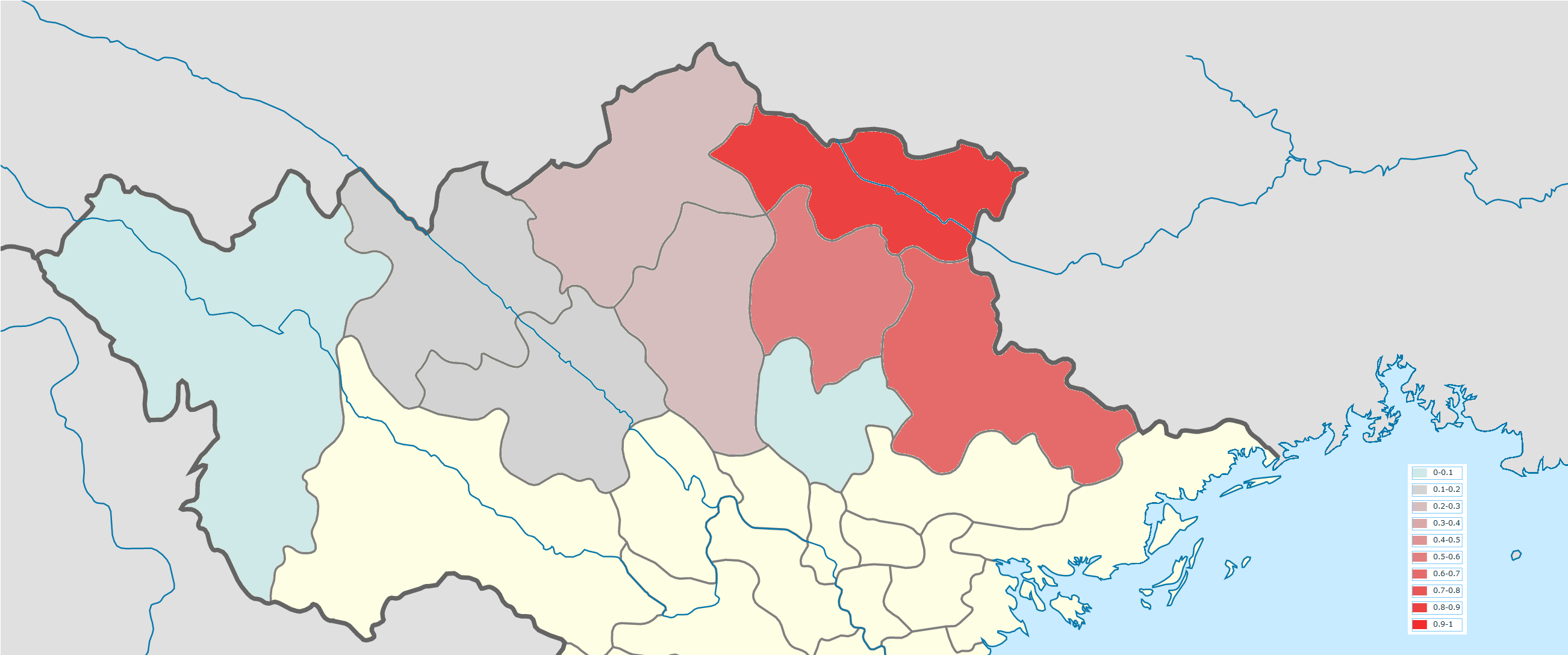
Distribution of Rau people in Vietnam

The Zhuang, Nùng, and Tày people are a cluster of Tai peoples with very similar customs and dress known as the Rau peoples. In China, the Zhuang are today the largest non-Han Chinese minority with around 14.5 million population in Guangxi Province alone. In Vietnam, as of 1999, there were 933,653 Nùng people and 1,574,822 Tày people. Recently the Tày and Nùng have been referred to as a combined Tày-Nùng minority. However these ethnonyms are a recent phenomenon and did not exist until the modern age. According to Keith Taylor, the Vietnamese terms were "categories of French colonial knowledge" used to differentiate highlanders from lowlanders. The ethnic Zhuang was a product of the "ethnic identification project" pursued in 1950s China.

Many scholars of the Tai peoples consider the Zhuang and Nùng to be essentially the same people, a single ethnic group. During the early 11th century, ethnic identities and boundaries were more fluid than in the modern Sino-Vietnamese borderland. The Zhuang leader Nong Zhigao was defeated in 1055 by the Song dynasty. Had he won, it is possible that he might have established a state under his own clan name, Nong. Instead, his people in China continued to be referred to as Zhuang, which in their own language means "cave", while in Vietnam they came to be known as Nùng. The majority ethnic group and now the largest minority, however, was and still is the same, the Zhuang/Nùng, who together number more than 15 million people. They are just recognized by different names in China and Vietnam. Nong Zhigao (V. Nùng Trí Cao) has sometimes been claimed by Vietnam as a Vietnamese native, but this is due to antagonism with modern China, while in previous times the Vietnamese sometimes saw him as primarily Chinese.

The Nung (Nong in Pinyin transcription as referred to above) were a branch of the proto-Zhuang peoples who had a political relationship with Nan Zhao, and its successor, Dali. The language and culture of the Nong is the same as the Zhuang, and only an accident of history prevents us from simplifying this description by simply referring to them as "Zhuang." People who would today in China be termed Zhuang because of their language and culture, but who live in Vietnamese territory are designated by several different terms, including Nung, Tho/Tay, Thai, and possibly others.

— Jeffrey Barlow

Like the Nùng, the Tày (originally Thổ) would have been classified as Zhuang had they lived in China. However unlike the Nùng, the Tày are considered the most Vietnamized of all the Thai peoples in Vietnam and lacquered their teeth black like the Viets. The Tày and Nùng frequently intermarried, although the Tày seem to have been held in higher regard.

== History ==
=== Rise of the Nùng ===
The major Zhuang clans were the Huang, Nong, and Wei. During the early Song dynasty, the Huang clan was left in charge of the You and Zuo rivers. The Wei had settled on the Song-Viet border. However the power of the Nong clan increased and began to upset Huang supremacy. By the early Song, they ruled over an area known as Temo, which stretched from modern Wenshan Zhuang and Miao Autonomous Prefecture in the west to Jingxi in the east and Guangyuanzhou (Quảng Nguyên, now Cao Bằng province) in the south. Emperor Taizong of Song (r. 976-997) bestowed special favors on Nong leadership, acknowledging that they had succeeded the Huang in the Zuo River region.

The Guangyuan zhou Man-barbarian Nong clan came from the south west... of Yongzhou and held the districts there. The terrain was steep mountains and inaccessible valleys; it produced gold and cinnabar. A good many people lived there. They wore their hair long and fastened their clothes on the left. They loved to fight and struggle and regarded death lightly. Earlier the leaders were of the Wei, Huang, Zhou and Nong clans which were constantly contending and pillaging each other.... The Huang clan offered pledges and 13 Bu-districts and 29 Man-barbarian Zhou-districts were established.

— History of Song

The first member of the Nong clan to gain official recognition was Nong Minfu. It is not known when he was born, but a memorial in early 977 states that the "peaceful and generous" leader Nong Minfu of Guangyuanzhou had established himself over ten neighboring villages with the support of Southern Han (907-971). Minfu had supported Duan Siping (r. 937–944) of the Dali Kingdom and was rewarded with titles. Duan rewarded another leader in Temo with the title buxie. The Song bestowed the titles "minister of works" (sigong) and "grand master of splendid happiness bearing the golden pocket with purple trimming" (jinzi guanglu daifu) on Minfu. These titles were passed onto Minfu's son, Nong Quanfu (Zhuang: Nungz Cienzfuk, Vietnamese: Nùng Tồn Phúc). He was also granted additional authority of Dangyouzhou (modern Jingxi, Guangxi). His younger brother, Nong Quanlu, controlled Wennaizhou (modern Na Rì District). Such preferential treatment was viewed with anger in Đại Cồ Việt, which attacked a Song garrison in 1004 after it held a banquet for a Nong chieftain.

In 1005, a woman known as A Nong was born to a notable warrior chieftain who accepted titles from both the Song dynasty and the Early Lê dynasty of Đại Cồ Việt. A Nong learned to spin and weave from her mother. At some point she was separated from the other girls and learned the ways of a shaman. She married Nong Quanfu and became his primary political adviser. Her brother, Nong Dangdao, inherited Wulezhou near Guangyuanzhou. She gave birth to Nong Zhigao in 1025. A Nong induced Quanfu to kill his brother, the leader of the Cen clan, and take his lands. The Nong clan eventually controlled 14 major grottoes (dong) in comparison to only 5 for the Huang clan.

In 1035, Quanfu declared the founding of the Kingdom of Longevity (Changsheng Guo 長生國) and took for himself the exalted title "Luminous and Sage Emperor" (Zhaosheng Huangdi 昭聖皇帝) while A Nong became the "Enlightened and Virtuous Empress" (Mingde Huanghou 明德皇后). Another source says he founded the Chang Qi Guo and styled himself the first king of Dali, Tu Dan Chao. The local prefect of Tianzhou requested assistance from Yongzhou to deal with the rebellion, but officials there appear to have feared involvement and refused to offer aid. In 1039, the emperor of the Lý dynasty, Lý Thái Tông, invaded the newly found kingdom, captured Quanfu and four other male members of the Nong clan, and executed them. A Nong escaped with the 14-year old Zhigao into Song territory.

=== Nùng Trí Cao ===
Nong Zhigao's movement in the Song dynasty

In 1041, Nong Zhigao and his mother seized Dangyouzhou (modern Jingxi, Guangxi) and the Leihuo grotto settlement (modern Daxin County). A Nong married a wealthy merchant but Zhigao murdered this man. A Nong married a third time to Nong Xiaqing, expanding their territory further into Temo. In 1042, Zhigao declared the founding the Kingdom of the Great Succession (Dali Guo 大歷國, not to be confused with the Kingdom of Dali 大理). Đại Cồ Việt sent troops and captured him. He was held prisoner for a year before he was released with an honorary title and given control of Guangyuan, Leihuo, Ping'an, Pinpo, and Silang in return for a share of their natural resources, particularly gold. In 1048, Zhigao declared another state, the Kingdom of the Southern Heavens (Nantian Guo), and took a reign title, "Auspicious Circumstances" (Jingrui). He called the Viet court's actions criminal and that his territory would not be annexed by China. In the fall of 1049, Zhigao's forces pillaged Yongzhou. In 1050, Đại Cồ Việt launched an attack on Zhigao's stronghold and evicted him, sending him fleeing into Song territory.

Nong Zhigao approached the Song at Yongzhou for assistance but was denied an audience until he staged a military demonstration beneath the walls. He then presented substantial tribute (tame elephants and lumps of gold and silver) and petitioned the emperor. The prefect of Yongzhou, Chen Gong, never passed on the petition to court. However, when the tribute reached the court, the Fiscal Commissioner Xiao Gu argued to the emperor that Zhigao should be granted title. The Song court refused because it considered Zhigao's service to be the right of Đại Cồ Việt. The military commander Yuan Yun was dispatched to attack Zhigao but instead he wanted to offer Zhigao protection, and returned to the capital with tribute, arguing for a change in policy.

Zhigao's followers set up shop and through the mineral wealth of his holdings formed close ties with Chinese traders, including jinshi degree holders Huang Wei and Huang Shifu. He also recruited other Nong clan members such as Nong Zhizhong and Nong Jianhou. Under the influence of Huang Wei and A Nong, Zhigao decided to declare independence. In 1052, Zhigao proclaimed the establishment of the Kingdom of the Great South (Danan Guo) and granted himself the title of Benevolent and Kind Emperor (Renhui Huangdi). In the spring of 1052, Zhigao ordered the villages under his control to be burnt and led 5,000 subjects on the path to Guangzhou. By summertime, he had taken Yongzhou and reached Guangzhou, where his 50,000 strong army became bogged down in a prolonged siege. Despite cutting off Guangzhou from water, the city was well stocked with provisions, and the defenders fought back with crossbow defenses. The district magistrate Xiao Zhu foiled a waterborne attack on Guangzhou by setting fire to their ships. After 57 days, Zhigao was forced to retreat as more Song reinforcements arrived. He held out at Yongzhou, defeating five Song commanders sent against him. The Song called in a veteran of the Song–Xia wars, Di Qing, to assume command of the anti-rebel forces. He gathered 31,000 men and 32 generals, including Fanluo tribal cavalry from the northwest that "were able to ascend and descend mountains as though walking on level ground." Lý Thái Tông also offered to send 20,000 troops but the offer was refused out of fear that the troops would not leave afterwards.

As for all the belongings that you amassed during your lives, they were destroyed today by heaven's fire. You have nothing to live on, and you are considered poor indeed! You must grab Yongzhou and capture Guangzhou where I will establish myself as its ruler. If you don't do this, you will necessarily die."

— Nong Zhigao

One general, Chen Shu, attacked early with 8,000 men and suffered a defeat against the Zhuang forces. Di Qing executed him and 31 officers. He then marched his forces under cover of night and blocked the Kunlun Pass east of Yongzhou. Zhigao attacked the Song forces in early 1054. The Zhuang wore bright crimson uniforms and fought in units of three armed with long shields that advanced "like fire." One man carried a shield while the other two hurled metal-tipped bamboo javelins. In the initial stages of battle, one Song commander was killed, and the Song army was momentarily forced to fall back. In the second engagement, the Zhuang forces could not withstand the Song infantry charges. The Song infantry hacked at the Zhuang shields with heavy swords and axes while the Fanluo cavalry attacked their wings, breaking their ranks. The Zhuang fled, suffering 5,341 casualties. Di Qing retook Yongzhou and executed the jinshi-holder Huang, two of Zhigao's family, and 57 officials. Zhigao and his remaining family fled to seek help from the Zhuang clans, but he was not well liked, and the Huang chieftain, Huang Shouling, refused to aid him. He also requested aid from the Viet court, which sent the tribal commander Võ Nhị to assist the rebels. A Nong and her son Nong Zhiguang, as well as Zhigao's sons Nong Jifeng and Nong Jizong, were caught at Temo in Yunnan by Zhuang forces allied with the Song. They were executed. Zhigao failed to raise more troops in Dali.

According to official accounts, Nong Zhigao was executed by the ruler of Dali and his head presented to Song authorities. However popular accounts claim he fled further south into modern northern Thailand, where his descendants thrive to this day. The Zhuang of Wenshan Zhuang and Miao Autonomous Prefecture identify as survivors of Zhigao's rebel movement and other groups in Dali City, Xishuangbana, and northern Thailand claim to be descended from Zhigao. Many Zhuang songs refer to him as "King Nong."

=== Migration ===
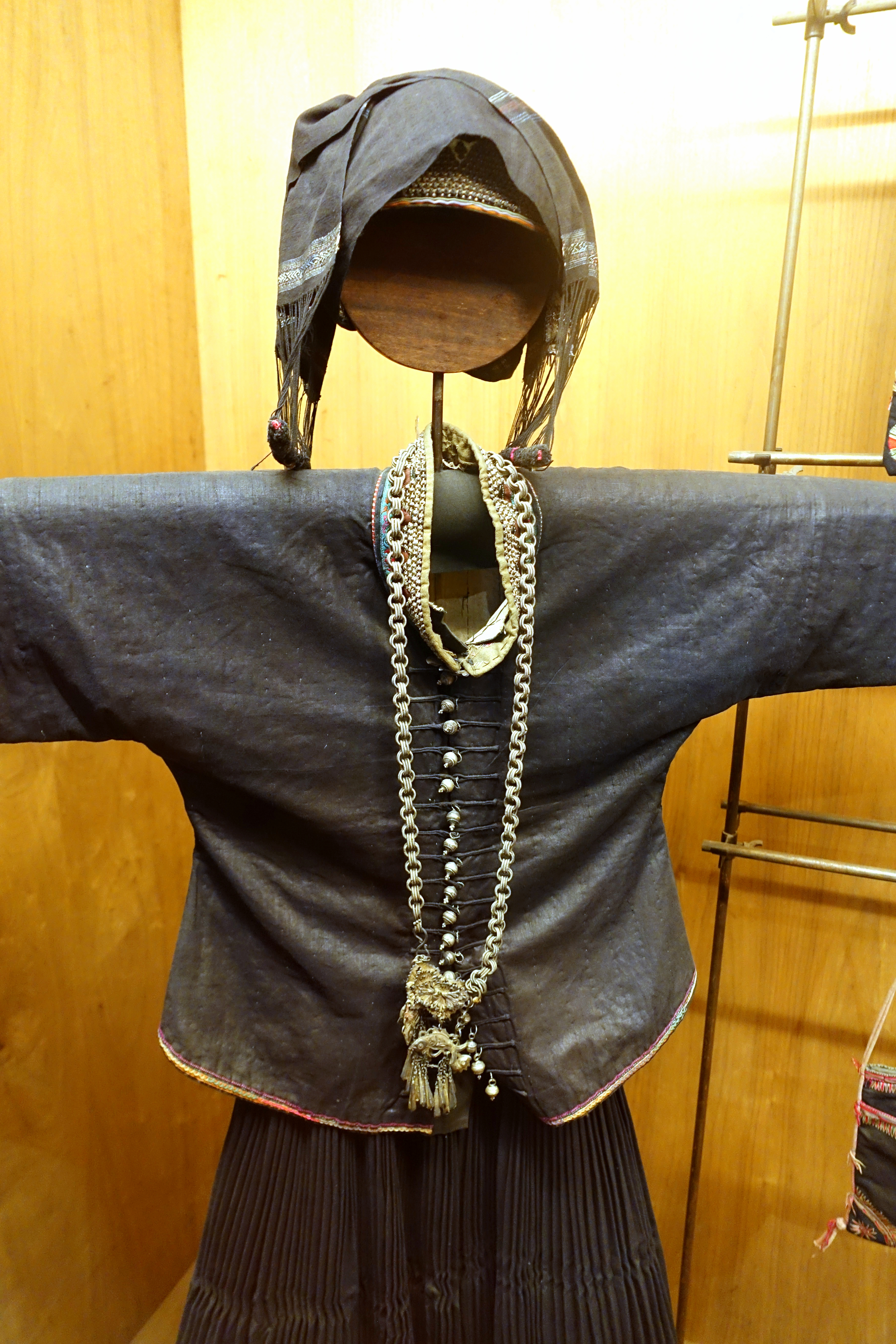
Nùng woman's clothing

After the defeat of Nùng Trí Cao, Many of the Nùng rebels fled to Vietnam, concentrating around Cao Bằng and Lạng Sơn provinces and became known as the Nùng. Barlow (2005) suggests that many of the original 11th-century rebels who fled to Vietnam were absorbed by the related Tày peoples of the region.

With the end of the Song–Đại Việt war in 1078, the Nùng north of the border became more sinicized by accepting greater integration into the Chinese tributary system while the Tai-speaking people south of the border in Đại Việt remained in a patron-client relationship with the Viet court. These Tai-speaking communities lived in the mountainous areas of Việt Bắc and most of their interaction with Viets was through the Các Lái, Kinh (Vietnamese) merchants who had obtained government licenses for trade in the uplands in return for tribute to the court. Assimilation with broader society was not necessary unlike in China. The Viet court ruled the frontier region using a system similar to the Chinese Tusi known as thổ ty. Thổ ty officials who governed the frontier held hereditary positions and passed on their position from generation to generation. The thổ ty were de facto rulers and held absolute authority in their own areas. They paid tribute to both Chinese and Viet authorities. As late as the 19th century, imperial presence was not guaranteed. Central expansion and assertion of authority by the Nguyễn dynasty over these areas was often met by violent local opposition. Unlike the Chinese however, the Viets did offer princesses to the thổ ty to cement allegiances. Despite this, most Nùng communities were self ruled as late as 1953 when the Viet Minh took the Việt Bắc region.

As the strongest thổ ty, Nùng Trí Cao (C. Nong Zhigao) and his family members were deified by these communities. After the Lam Sơn uprising which ended the Ming occupation, the Viet ruler Lê Lợi consolidated support from border communities by acknowledging a variety of local deities. It's suggested that a shrine to Nùng Trí Cao, the Great King of Kỳ Sầm Temple, was erected in the western outskirts of Cao Bằng in connection to the suppression of a rebel force by Lê forces in 1431. Worship of Nùng Trí Cao was widespread by the 19th century. In 1897, it was reported that local leaders had arranged the renovation of Kỳ Sầm Temple in conjunction with the Nùng clan. On the tenth day of the first lunar month a festival was held around the temple. Apparently "Han Chinese" from the Qing dynasty flooded the region during the festival so that Quảng Nguyên "resembled nothing more than another region of China." Another festival focused on trade was held around the temple in the third lunar month during Thanh Minh (Qingming Festival).

The Nùng, although lacking a leader of the stature of Nùng Trí Cao, rose up in 1352, 1430, 1434.

In the 16th century the Zhuang from Guangxi and perhaps from southeast Yunnan began migrating into Vietnam. This movement was accelerated by the cycle of disasters and political events of the seventeenth century which brought larger numbers of Chinese immigrants into the region, such as the fall of the Ming, the rebellion of Wu Sangui, the Qing occupation, and the Muslim revolts in Yunnan.This migration was a peaceful one which occurred family by family. French administrators later identified a number of Nùng clans in the course of their ethnographic surveys. These had incorporated Chinese place names in their clan names and indicated the place of their origin in China, such as the "Nùng Inh" clan from Long Ying in the southwest of Guangxi. Other names also reflected the locations from where they came, indicating that they were primarily from the immediate frontier region of the southwest of Guangxi. The Nùng became increasingly numerous in the region, and were spread out through a long stretch of the Vietnamese northern border from Lạng Sơn to Cao Bằng. The Mạc dynasty, a Vietnamese dynasty ruled over the Vietnamese northeast highlands, profited from the migration in that they were able to draw upon Nùng manpower for their own forces.

In 1833, Nông Văn Vân, a Nùng chieftain, led a rebellion against Vietnamese rule. He quickly took control of Cao Bằng, Tuyên Quang, Thái Nguyên and Lạng Sơn provinces, aiming to create a separate Tày-Nùng state in the northern region of Vietnam. His rising was eventually suppressed by the Nguyễn dynasty in 1835. In the 1860s, the Nùng sided with Sioung (Xiong), a self-proclaimed Hmong king. Sioung's armies raided gold from Buddhist temples and seized large tracts of land from other people.

The period from the Taiping Rebellion (1850–64) to the early twentieth century was marked by continual waves of immigration by Zhuang/Nùng peoples from China into Vietnam. These waves were a result of the continuous drought of Guangxi which made the thinly occupied lands of northern Vietnam an attractive alternative habitation. The immigration process was generally a peaceful one as the Nùng purchased land from the "Tho" owners. The Nùng were superior to the Tho in cultivating wet rice and transformed poor lands, facilitating later migrations into adjoining areas. The repeated violent incursions of the Taiping era and the Black Flag occupation accelerated the outflow of Tho as the bands from China were largely Zhuang who favored the Nùng at the expense of the Tho. The Tho who remained became alienated from the Vietnamese government which could not offer protection and became clients of the Chinese and the Nùng.

=== Colonialism ===
The Nùng dominance became so pronounced that when Sun Yat-sen wished to raise fighters in the region, he could recruit them from Nùng villages such as Na Cen and Na Mo, both on the Vietnamese side of the border. The French colonists saw this Nùng predominance as a threat, and found it convenient at that time to re-assert the primacy of the Vietnamese administrative system in the region. The French colonizers of the Tonkin Protectorate also saw the Nùng as potential converts to the colonial order and portrayed them as oppressed minorities who had suffered under Chinese and Viet rule. According to a 1908 military dispatch by Commandant LeBlond, they had been "subjugated and held ransom during many long centuries, sometimes by the one, sometimes by the other, the [Nùng] race has become flexible and is frequently able to ascertain the stronger [neighbor], to which it would turn instinctively. French domination appears soft to him and benevolent, compared with that of Annamites or the Chinese." During the Cần Vương movement to restore Viet independence, the Nùng showed little interest in supporting the lowland Kinh Viets against the French. Some of the upland peoples supported the Black Flag Army who fought against the French, while others sided with the French.

The French, however, perhaps having less choice, tended to support the Tho and other minorities, often undifferentiated as "Man" in their reports—usually a reference to Yao—as a counterweight against the Nùng. In 1908, for example, following an incident in which Sun Yat-sen's mercenary Nùng warriors had killed several French officers, the French offered a bounty of eight dollars for each head brought in by the "Man". The bounty was paid 150 times.

When the Indochinese Communist Party was founded in 1930, its policy suggested upland peoples and minorities should be given full autonomy once the French colonial order was overthrown, however such policy was given little attention until 1941 when support from these communities became a strategic necessity. The Nùng assisted Ho Chi Minh in his activities. As a result of anti-French activities, temples of Nùng Trí Cao were destroyed. The French had more success with the Tai Dón people along the Lao-border, who established a regime known as Sip Song Chau Tai (French: Pays Taï) under the control of collaborator Đèo Văn Long. When war broke out in 1946, groups of Thai, H’mong and Muong in the northwest sided with the French and against the Vietnamese and even provided battalions to fight with the French troops. But The Nùng and Tày supported the Viet Minh and provided the Vietnamese leader, Ho Chi Minh, with a safe base for his guerrilla armies. After defeating the French at Dien Bien Phu in 1954, the Viet Minh tried to win the allegiance of all of the northern ethnic minorities by creating two autonomous zones, Thai–Meo Autonomous Zone and Viet Bac Autonomous Zone respectively, allowing limited self-government within a “unified multi-national state”. During the Vietnam War, many Nùng fought alongside the North Vietnamese Army (NVA).

In 1954, several thousand Nùng Phàn Slình came to South Vietnam as refugees and settled in Lâm Đồng Province

=== Nationalism ===
During the Vietnam War, Nùng villages in the Việt Bắc region received very little damage and avoided the devastation of upland communities in the Central Highlands. Although the Democratic Republic of Vietnam supervised state-sponsored migration to upland areas, the north did not experience a massive influx of Kinh Viets, so the ethnic balance around the Nùng Trí Cao temples remained fairly consistent. However the Viet Bac Autonomous Zone in which the Nùng and Tày were most numerous was revoked by Lê Duẩn and the government pursued a policy of forced assimilation of minorities into Vietnamese culture. All education was conducted in the Vietnamese language, traditional customs were discouraged or outlawed, and minority people were moved from their villages into government settlements. At the same time the government created “New Economic Zones” along the Chinese border and in the Central Highlands. Frequently this involved taking the best land in order to resettle thousands of people from the overcrowded lowlands. As tension arose between Vietnam and China in 1975, Hanoi feared the loyalty of the Nùng and the Chinese-Vietnamese. After the Sino-Vietnamese War, support for Nùng Trí Cao could be read as anti-Chinese, as he was mainly seen as a rebel against Chinese authority. Even so, during the 1980s, an estimated 250,000 ethnic Vietnamese were settled in the mountainous regions along the Chinese border, leading to a shortage of food in the region and much suffering.

Five temples dedicated to Nùng Trí Cao remained active into the 20th century. The keepers of the Kỳ Sầm Temple all bear the surname Nùng. Although a Romanized script has been created for the Nùng language, worshipers of the temple prefer Chinese, similar to the Zhuang in China, and sometimes Vietnamese. In the 1990s, the Doi Moi program shifted the policy of ethnic affairs towards liberalization and preservation. Part of this was the appeal of creating tourist attractions and revenue. The Kỳ Sầm Temple was renovated sometime prior to 2001 to portray a more nationalistic image. The exterior and interior pillars of the temple have been retouched and the Chinese-character inscriptions at the front and Quốc ngữ inscriptions on the walls have been removed. References to "King Nùng" who had "raised high the banner proclaiming independence" have been replaced with floral patterns and pictures of horses, generic symbols associated with local heroes. A large sign indicates the temple as a historical landmark.

== Culture ==
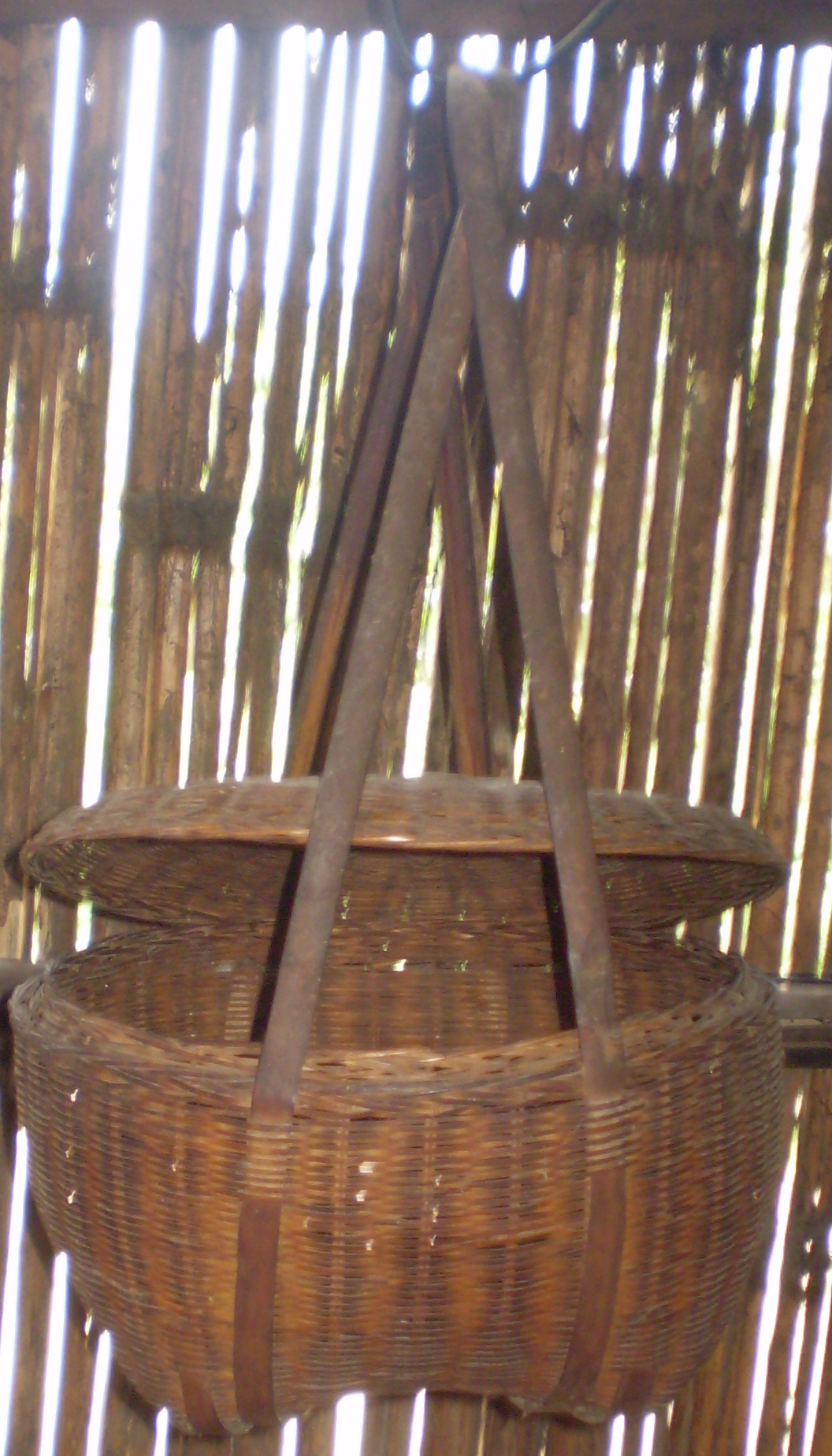
A hand basket of Nùng people in Vietnam

=== Economy ===
When the Nùng moved into Vietnam from Guangxi during the 12th and 13th centuries, they developed slash-and-burn agriculture and worked on terraced hillsides, tending rice paddies and using water wheels for irrigation. The Nùng engage in similar forms of agriculture today, using their gardens to grow a variety of vegetables, corn, peanuts, and fruits such as tangerines, persimmons, anise and other spices, and bamboo as cash crops. Nùng material culture is similar to other highlanders. They live on higher elevation with houses built with clay on stilts near rivers to avoid flooding. Like the Tày, they are known for silversmithing, weaving, basketry, papermaking, and embroidery. Indigo, which represents faithfulness, is a popular choice of color for clothing. Typical motifs for embroidery are the sun, flowers, and stars.

=== Customs ===
Nùng society is patrilineal and grouped into clans denoted by the region in China they came from. In the past, men could marry outside the clan but women could marry only within the clan, however this practice has declined in the present day. Men could have multiple wives.

=== Language ===
The Nùng language is part of the Tai language family. Both the Nùng and Tay people used Sawndip script, also known as the Old Zhuang Script, to represent their language, which is closely related to the Zhuang language. Sawndip is a writing system based on Chinese characters to represent their language. In Vietnam, the Tay and Nùng people can no longer read Chinese and write the pronunciation of the characters next to them in the Vietnamese alphabet for their ritual manuscripts.

=== Religion ===
Many Nùng practice an indigenous religion with animistic, totemic and shamanic features similarly to other Tai ethnic groups. In addition, Nùng religious practices are heavily influenced by Buddhism and Confucianism. The Nùng worship Quan Âm (Guanyin) as the goddess of compassion and kindness.

Local religious services are led by a village shaman who oversees animal sacrifices and communication with the spiritual world. Nature spirits are known as the phi in Nùng cosmology. Ancestor worship is also practiced.

== Notable people ==
- Chu Văn Tấn, a general of North Vietnam
- Kim Đồng, fighter of the August Revolution in 1945.
- Nong Quanfu, a Nùng chieftain
- Nong Zhigao, a Nùng chieftain

== See also ==
- Zhuang people
- Tay people
- Yue (state)
- Wu (state)
- Chu (state)
- Tai-Kadai languages
- Tai languages
- Xi'ou
- Luoyue
- Baiyue

== Sources ==
- Barlow, Jeffrey (2005). "The Zhuang: A Longitudinal Study of Their History and Their Culture". Pacific University. Archived from the original on 2007-02-06.
- Blust, Robert (1996). "Beyond the Austronesian Homeland: The Austric Hypothesis and Its Implications for Archaeology". In Goodenough, Ward H. (ed.). Prehistoric Settlement of the Pacific, Volume 86, Part 5. Vol. 86. American Philosophical Society. pp. 117–158. doi:10.2307/1006623. ISBN 978-0-871-69865-0. JSTOR 1006623.
- Brown, Michael Edward; Ganguly, Sumit (2003). Fighting Words: Language Policy and Ethnic Relations in Asia. MIT Press. ISBN 978-0-262-52333-2.
- GSO (June 2010). "The 2009 Vietnam Population and Housing Census: Completed Results". General Statistics Office of Vietnam.
- Hoàng Nam (2008). The Nùng ethnic group of Việt Nam. Hanoi: Thế Giới Publishers.
- Hoover, Daniel J. (2010). The migration of Chinese-Vietnamese from Vietnam : the Truong Family. Department of History, Baylor University (Thesis).
- Johnson, Eric C. (September 2010). "A Sociolinguistic Introduction to the Central Taic Languages of Wenshan Prefecture, China" (PDF). SIL Electronic Survey Report (2010–027). In cooperation with Mingfu Wang (王明富).
- Minahan, James B. (2012-08-30). Ethnic Groups of South Asia and the Pacific: An Encyclopedia. ABC-CLIO. ISBN 9781598846607.
- Nguyễn, Thị Yên (2009). Tày-Nùng Folk Beliefs. Hanoi: Social Sciences Publishing House. Vb 47561.
- Wilson, Nancy F.; Vy, Thị Bé (1976). Sẹc mạhn slú Nohng Fạn Slihng = Ngũ-vụng Nùng Phạn Slinh = Nung Fan Slihng vocabulary: Nung-Viêt-English (PDF). Summer Institute of Linguistics.

== Bibliography ==
- Anderson, James A. (2012) [2007], The Rebel Den of Nung Tri Cao: loyalty and identity along the Sino-Vietnamese frontier, University of Washington Press, ISBN 978-0-295-80077-6.
- ——— (1987), "The Zhuang Minority Peoples of the Sino-Vietnamese Frontier in the Song Period", Journal of Southeast Asian Studies, 18 (2): 250–269, doi:10.1017/s0022463400020543, JSTOR 20070970, S2CID 163042066.
- Chaisingkananont, Somrak (2014). The Quest for Zhuang Identity: Cultural Politics of Promoting the Buluotuo Cultural Festival in Guangxi, China (Ph.D. thesis). National University of Singapore. hdl:10635/118867.
- —— (2013), Mapping the Old Zhuang Character Script: A Vernacular Writing System from Southern China, Brill, ISBN 978-9-004-22369-1.
- Ng, Candice Sheung Pui (2011). "On "Constructed" Identities: A Dialogue on the Nature of Zhuang Identity". Journal of Oriental Studies. 44 (1/2): 45–61. JSTOR 44009390.
- Taylor, K. W. (2013). A History of the Vietnamese. Cambridge University Press. ISBN 978-0-521-87586-8.
- West, Barbara A. (2008), Encyclopedia of the Peoples of Asia and Oceania
