= Phúc Hòa (disambiguation) =

Phúc Hòa may refer to several places in Vietnam, including:

- Phúc Hòa, Hanoi, a rural commune of Phúc Thọ District.
- Phúc Hòa, Bắc Giang, a rural commune of Tân Yên District.

== See also ==
- Phục Hòa District, a former district of Cao Bằng Province.
