= Shuikou, Chongzuo =

Coordinates: 22°28′11″N 106°34′56″E

Shuikou 水口镇
- Town
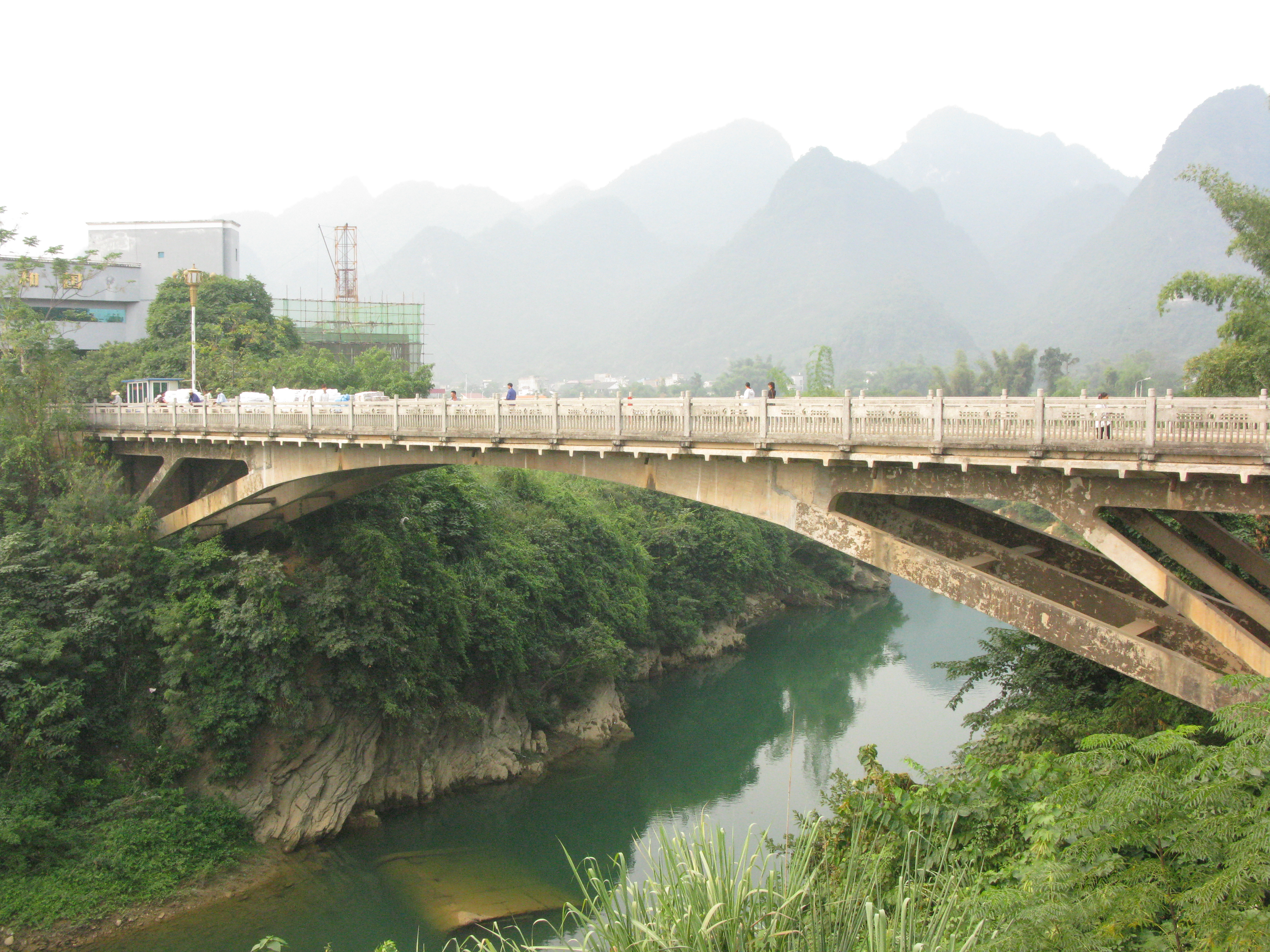
- Border bridge with Vietnam
- Interactive map of Shuikou
- Country: China
- Region: Guangxi
- Prefecture-level city: Chongzuo
- County: Longzhou

Area
  - Total: 211.35 km^{2} (81.60 sq mi)

Population (2011)
  - Total: 23,962

Shuikou is a town in Longzhou County, Chongzuo, Guangxi, China. It is a border town of Tà Lùng in Vietnam. Due to its location on the border crossing to Vietnam and its educational and medical infrastructure, Shuikou is of regional importance.

Shuikou mainly produces sugar cane, rice, corn, beans and fruits such as jackfruit. Shuikou's main industries are in the food and medicine industries. There are several monuments that commemorate the events surrounding the Sino-French War of 1885.

== Border crossing ==
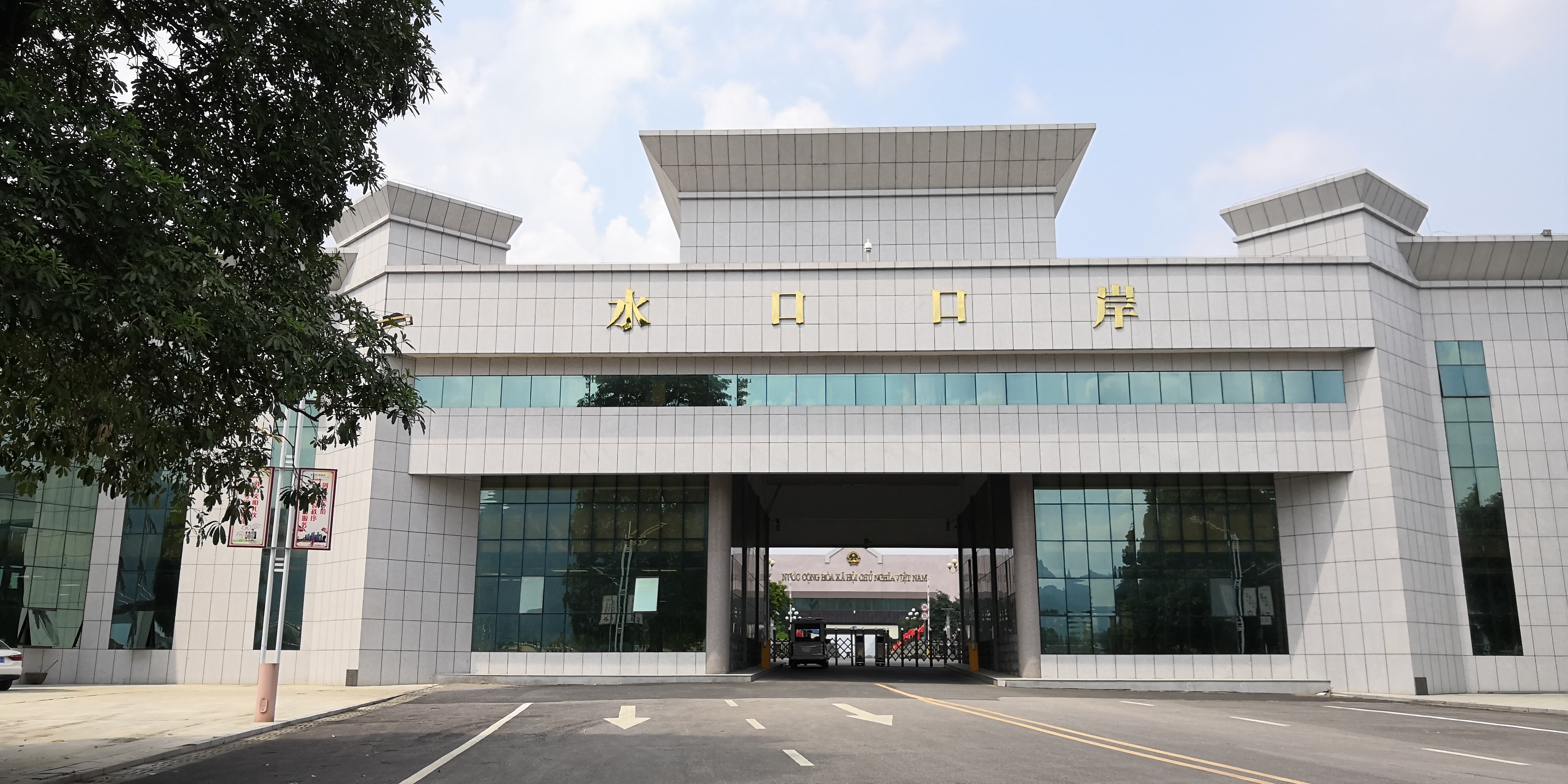
Shuikou border checkpoint

Shuikou border crossing is a national first-class trade port.

In 1792 the border crossing officially opened. In 1889, an customs office was set up to facilitate trading. Through the 1950s, significant amounts of aid was sent through Shuikou to support North Vietnam in the war. In 1978, over 30,000 ethnic Chinese fled from Vietnam to China through the town, as tensions built up between the countries. Between 1979 and 1993 the crossing was closed due to hostile China–Vietnam relations. Nowadays it is one of the three major border crossings between Guangxi province and Vietnam. A new, larger cross-border bridge is under construction.

Notably 90% of China's cashew nut trade passes through this border crossing.

== Transport ==
- China National Highway 219
- China National Highway 358
- Guangxi Provincial Expressway S62 (Chongzuo-Shuikou Expressway)

== See also ==
- Bằng River
- List of township-level divisions of Guangxi
