= Nong Quanfu =

Nong Quanfu 儂全福
- Emperor

Emperor of Changqi (長其)
- Reign: 1038–1039
- Predecessor: -
- Successor: Nong Zhigao
- Born: Unknown; Guangyuan, Guangnan West Circuit, Northern Song dynasty (modern-day Cao Bằng, Vietnam)
- Died: 1039; Thăng Long, Lý dynasty (modern-day Hanoi, Vietnam)
- Spouse: A Nong Enlightened and Virtuous Empress (明德皇后)
- Issue: Nong Zhigao (儂智高); Nong Zhicong (儂智聰); Nong Zhiguang (儂智光)
Names
- Nong Quanfu (儂全福), or Nong Cunfu (儂存福)
Regnal name
- Emperor Zhaosheng (昭聖皇帝)
- House: Nong
- Dynasty: Changqi (長其)
- Religion: Shamanism, Animism

Nong Quanfu (Chinese: 儂全福; pinyin: Nóng Quánfú, Zhuang: Nungz Cienzfuk; ?-1039), also recorded as Nùng Tồn Phúc (Vietnamese: Nùng Tồn Phúc; Chữ Hán: 儂存福), was a Zhuang (Nùng) chieftain and the founding emperor of the Kingdom of Changqi (長其國). He was originally a zhou-level official of the Northern Song dynasty in Guangyuan (modern-day Cao Bằng, Vietnam) in the 11th century AD. He was the father of Nong Zhigao.

== Biography ==
Nong Quanfu was a son of Nong Minfu, a local chieftain of Guangyuan. Nong Minfu received the titles Minister of Works (司空) and grand master of splendid happiness bearing the golden pocket with purple trimming (金紫光祿大夫) from the Northern Song court, which he eventually passed on to his son, Nong Zhigao. Nong Quanfu was then granted the additional authority to rule Thang Do prefecture in the southeastern corner of the present-day Jingxi county, in Guangxi. His younger brother and brother-in-law controlled two other nearby prefectures. Quanfu's home prefecture was a great source of gold, which together with his domination over local trade route along the Bang river must have largely increased his wealth and political influence. Around 1020, Nong Quanfu married A Nong, a shamaness and the daughter of a noted chieftain of the Nong clan. Later, A Nong became his primary political advisor. Under A Nong's instruction, Quanfu killed his brother who was a leader in the Cen (岑) clan and took his land. (Note: Jeffrey G. Barlow (1987:256) writes that Nong Quanfu first killed his own brother, then a leader of the Cen clan, and took their lands.) Nung/Zhuang chieftains allocated lands to followers in a true feudal system, with some attributes of slave-holding practices. The amount of land controlled by a chieftain affected the number of men he could field, a powerful incentive to expansive warfare. The Nong clan eventually controlled 14 majors dongs, compared to 5 claimed by the Huang clan. Quanfu found the Kingdom of Changqi (長其國; alternatively known as "Kingdom of Changsheng", 長生國) and took for himself the regnal name "Emperor Zhaosheng" (昭聖皇帝). He gave his wife A Nong the title "Empress Mingde" (明德皇后). Nong Quanfu then broke off all ties with the Lý dynasty, then during the reign of Lý Thái Tông, but was finally captured and executed by the Lý court in 1039.
