= Nong Minfu =

Nong Minfu (Chinese: 儂民富; pinyin: Nóng Mínfù, Vietnamese: Nùng Dân Phú; fl. 970s) was a Tai-speaking Rau chieftain who ruled over an area in what is today's Sino-Vietnamese borderland. He could have been Nong Quanfu's father. He was probably the leader of a confederation of tribes.

Some time before 971, the Southern Han dynasty recognized him as the leader of "ten prefectures", which were actually eight jimi prefectures plus two valleys, namely Quảng Nguyên Prefecture (廣源州; modern Quảng Uyên), Wule (武勒) or Wuqin Prefecture (武勤州; modern Fusui County), Nanyuan Prefecture (南源州), Tây Nông Prefecture (西農州), Vạn Nhai Prefecture (萬涯州 or 萬崖州), Phú Hòa Prefecture (覆和州), Wen Prefecture (溫州; modern Hurun), Nong Prefecture (弄州), as well as Gufu Valley (古拂洞) and Badan Valley (八耽洞). Altogether these constitute much of today's Cao Bằng Province, Vietnam plus a small part of southwestern Guangxi (Jingxi and Chongzuo), China.

In 971, on the eve of the Song conquest of Southern Han, the Dali Empire defeated Southern Han troops and extended its territory eastward to the modern Guangxi–Yunnan border. The Dali emperor gave Nong Minfu the title of "Tanchuo" (坦綽; "peaceful and generous"), which was often granted to princes by Dali's predecessor Nanzhao. Some historians believe Nong Minfu was also a leader of Temo Prefecture (特磨道; modern Guangnan County) on the Guangxi-Yunnan border. This is controversial but if true, indicates that he had additional control over several prefectures from Temo to Quảng Nguyên.

In 977, six years after the Song Empire conquered Southern Han from the north, Nong Minfu approached the Song government in Yong Prefecture which relayed his message to Emperor Taizong. Nong hoped for military assistance to eradicate "barbarians" of Tư Lang Prefecture (思琅州; modern Hạ Lang District), who controlled some important roads between his uphill prefectures. In exchange, Nong was willing to recognize Song suzerainty and pay tributes and taxes. Emperor Taizong was eager to please his frontier people but unwilling to send troops. He bestowed on Nong several grand — but completely nominal and useless — official titles, including "Grand Master of Splendid Happiness Bearing the Golden Pocket with Purple Trimming" (金紫光錄大夫), "Acting Minister of Works" (檢校司空), "Censor-in-Chief" (御史大夫), and "Supreme Pillar of the State" (上柱國). The Fiscal Commissioner (轉運使) of Guangnan Circuit, Xu Dao (徐道), was assigned the task of traveling to Nong's base to confer his titles. Nong Minfu disappeared from Chinese records after that, but he probably passed his authorities to Nong Quanfu when he died.
