= Nong Zhigao =

Nong Zhigao 儂智高
- Emperor
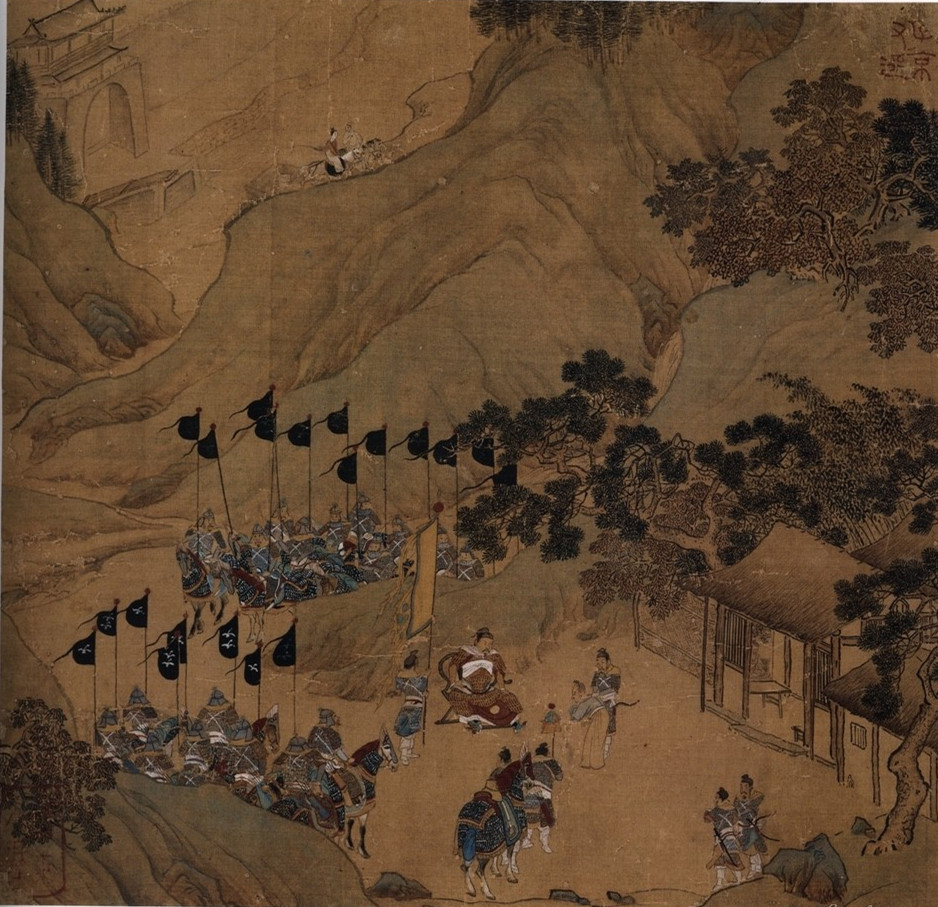
- Depiction of Nong Zhigao Passing the Border, Ming dynasty, 15th century

Chieftain of Nong (儂) clan
- Reign: 1041
- Predecessor: Nong Quanfu

Emperor of Dali (大曆)
- Reign: 1042

Emperor of Nantian (南天)
- Reign: 1048

Emperor of Danan (大南)
- Reign: 1052 – 1055
- Born: 1025; Guangyuan, Guangnan West Circuit, Northern Song dynasty (modern-day Cao Bằng, Vietnam)
- Died: Unknown
- Issue: Nong Jifeng (儂繼封); Nong Jiming (儂繼明)
Regnal name
- Emperor Renhui (仁惠皇帝)
- House: Nong
- Dynasty: Dali (大曆; 1041); Nantian (南天; 1045–1052); Danan (大南; 1052–1053)
- Father: Nong Quanfu
- Mother: A Nong
- Religion: Shamanism, Animism

Nong Zhigao (Chinese: 儂智高; pinyin: Nóng Zhìgāo; modern Zhuang language: Nungz Ciqgaoh; Vietnamese: Nùng Trí Cao) (1025–1055?) was a Zhuang (Nùng) chieftain and the only emperor of Dali (大曆; 1041), Nantian (南天; 1045–1052), and eventually Danan (大南; 1052–1053).

Today, he is admired by the Zhuang people of China, as well as the Nùng and Tày peoples of Vietnam. His father, Nong Quanfu, was a leader of the local Zhuang people in Guangyuan, Guangnan West Circuit, of the Northern Song dynasty.

== Summary ==
According to the History of Song: Biography of the Guangyuan Zhou Man (宋史·廣源州蠻傳), Nong Zhigao succeeded his father, Nong Quanfu, as chieftain of the local Zhuang people in Guangyuan (modern-day Cao Bằng, Vietnam), then under the rule of the Northern Song dynasty.

In 1042, at the age of 17, Zhigao declared independence and established a new state, Dali (大曆). For this, Zhigao was captured by Vietnamese troops and held at Thăng Long for several years. After his release in 1048, Zhigao announced the founding of the Nantian (南天, "Southern Heavens") Kingdom. Following his announcement, the Vietnamese court launched an attack on Zhigao's stronghold, succeeding only in relocating Zhigao's force and his followers farther north into Song territory. Later in 1052, Zhigao proclaimed the establishment of the Danan Kingdom (大南, "Great South") and took the regnal name "Emperor Renhui" (仁惠皇帝). He then took Yong (Nanning), swept through the southeast en route to Guangdong and besieged Guangzhou for 57 days. After lifting the siege at Guangzhou, Nong Zhigao moved north, rapidly defeating a succession of Song forces due to his superior mobility. Then the Zhuang turned south and west, retaking Yong in October 1052, which had again fallen into Song hands. At Yong, Nong Zhigao immediately began building boats, announcing his intention to attack Guangzhou again and found the state Nanyue there. A succession of Song forces were sent against him, but he defeated them in the mountains around Yong. The Emperor Renzong of Song dispatched Di Qing, a career military official, to attack Zhigao, and he eventually managed to defeat Zhigao's army. After that Zhigao and his followers fled to Yunnan, as well as modern-day Thailand and Laos.

The defeat of Nong Zhigao may have ultimately been due to the failure of the Huang and Cen clans among the Zhuang to support him. Both the Huang and Cen clans had lost territory to the Nong clan of Nong Zhigao and were disturbed by the Nong intrusions. One weakness of the Zhuang combined forces was their cavalry. The region was a horse-trading center and there were specialized mounted units in which both man and horse were heavily armored, but the mountainous terrain and many rivers restricted the utility of cavalry.

== Veneration ==
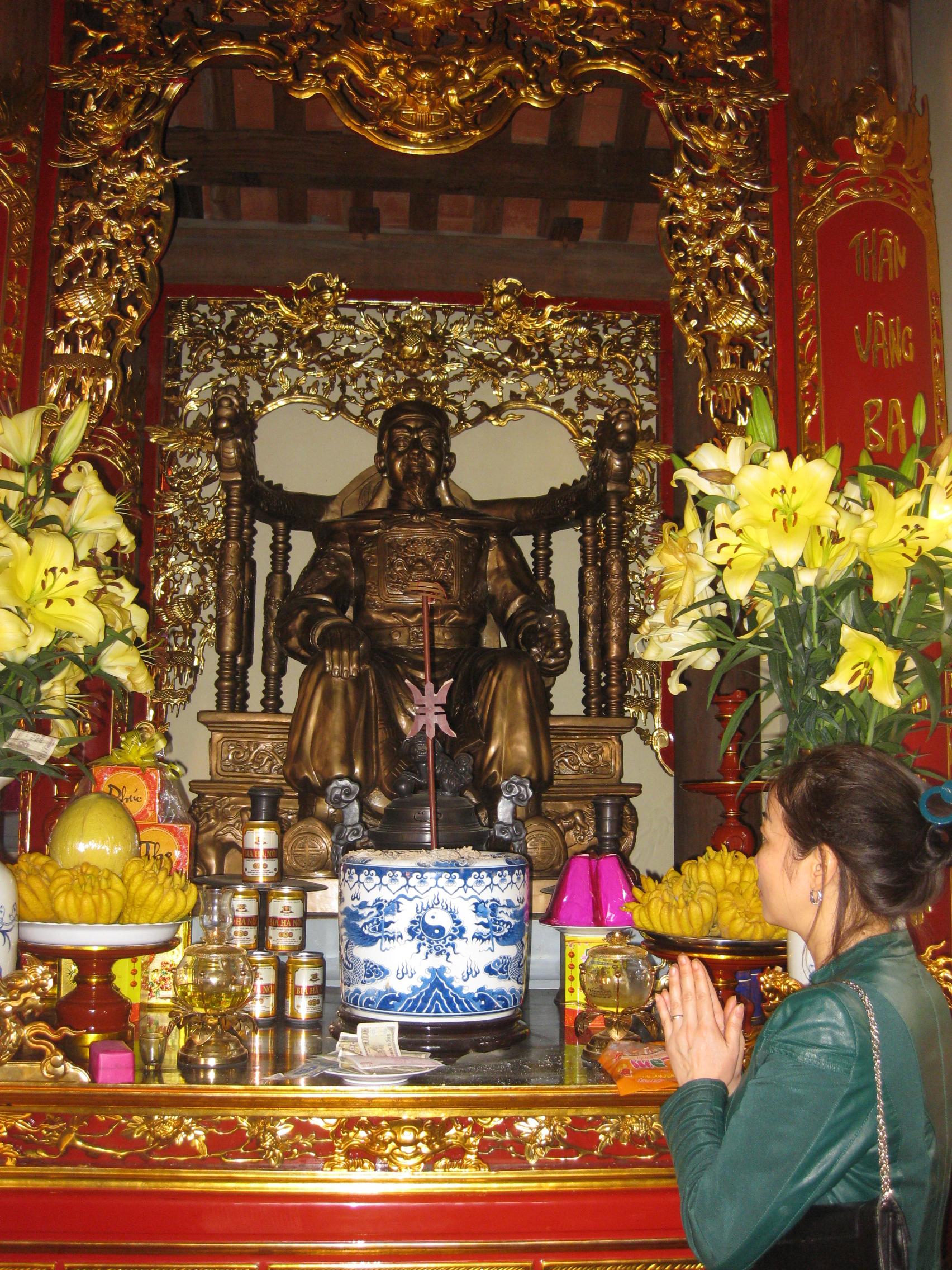
Statue of Nong Zhigao

The modern-day veneration of Nong Zhigao and his father Nong Quanfu and his mother A Nong in Cao Bằng province is closely tied to the shared regional identity of people from this region. Nong Zhigao remains a hero and a “man of prowess,” and worship includes practices that highlight the particular strengths of Nong Zhigao, including his willingness to face up to the aggression of both Song and Đai Viêt authorities and his ambition to unify and heighten the status of his region's people. From the historical record, one can also see that, by the late 19th century, annual festivals devoted to the spirit of Nong Zhigao were regionally important. It is equally apparent that the appeal of these festivals extended beyond clan or ethnic affiliations to the general populace that has often included communities on both sides of the modern political border. At Du-zhun village in Guangxi there was a Spirit Temple to him where lightning and thunder manifestations were still being recorded in the 18th century.

Five temples dedicated to Nong Zhigao in Vietnam remained active into the 20th century. The keepers of the Kỳ Sầm Temple all bear the surname Nùng. Although a romanized script has been created for the Nùng language, worshipers of the temple prefer Chinese, similar to the Zhuang in China, and sometimes Vietnamese. In the 1990s, the Doi Moi program shifted the policy of ethnic affairs towards liberalization and preservation. Part of this was the appeal of creating tourist attractions and revenue. The Kỳ Sầm Temple was renovated sometime prior to 2001 to portray a more nationalistic image. The exterior and interior pillars of the temple have been retouched and the Chinese-character inscriptions at the front and Quốc ngữ inscriptions on the walls have been removed. References to "King Nùng" who had "raised high the banner proclaiming independence" have been replaced with "folk art" floral patterns, pictures of horses and generic symbols of folkloric heroes. A large sign indicates the temple as a historical landmark. Nong Zhigao has sometimes been claimed by Vietnam as a native Vietnamese but this is a recent phenomenon related to antagonism with modern China, whereas in previous times the Vietnamese saw him as Chinese.

In stark contrast to the wealth of evidence for worship activity in northern Viet Nam, there is little confirmation in the Chinese historical record of the existence of temple sites dedicated to Nong Zhigao in China. In fact, most relevant Chinese sources only describe stelae and temples that honor the names of the Song generals who crushed Nong Zhigao's bid for independence. Only in the last few years has the issue of a public memorial to Nong Zhigao in China been addressed. On January 8, 1997 a local group of Nong Zhigao's descendants and their supporters from the Guangxi township of Jingxi (靖西) and the tiny village of Xialei (下雷) took the initiative to revive interest in this rebel's life and deeds. The vice-director of the Center for Zhuang studies in Nanning, Pan Qixu (潘其旭), had earlier been invited to Xia Lei to authenticate the discovery of the cave believed to be Nong Zhigao′s dwelling and storehouse at the time he founded his first kingdom. A modern stele was then erected on this site. A large group of provincial officials and leading academics from Guangxi reportedly attended the commemoration ceremony.

This ceremony did generate some controversy. Funds for this stele had to be raised privately. Organizers of this event said that high-level political figures have avoided involvement in the project, voicing concerns over its "separatist" implications. Nevertheless, the goal of bringing Nong Zhigao back into the public eye was largely successful, as the long list of small donors to the stele installation suggested. A glance at the large donors list, however, reveals that 32 out of the 34 persons included had the surname Nong. This fact suggests that although distant Han officials fear that the memorial could be used to fan regional "Pan-Tai" sentiments, older clan associations may shape local identification with this site.

Local disputes aside, this recent Guangxi memorial and the continuing regional popularity of the temples in Viet Nam are signs that the region has recovered from the "dark days" of the 1980s when the Sino-Vietnamese border remained tense and frosty diplomatic relations curbed official crossborder activities. Communities that honor Nong Zhigao still span a region that contains many historical sites of bloody confrontation between Chinese and Vietnamese armies. However, these communities share a common thread of identity, preserved in part by a devotion to the figure of Nong Zhigao.

== See also ==
- History of the Song dynasty
