= Di Qing =

Chinese military general (1008–1057)

- Family name: Dí (狄); Given name: Qīng (青); Courtesy name: Hànchén (漢臣); Posthumous name: Wǔxiāng (武襄)
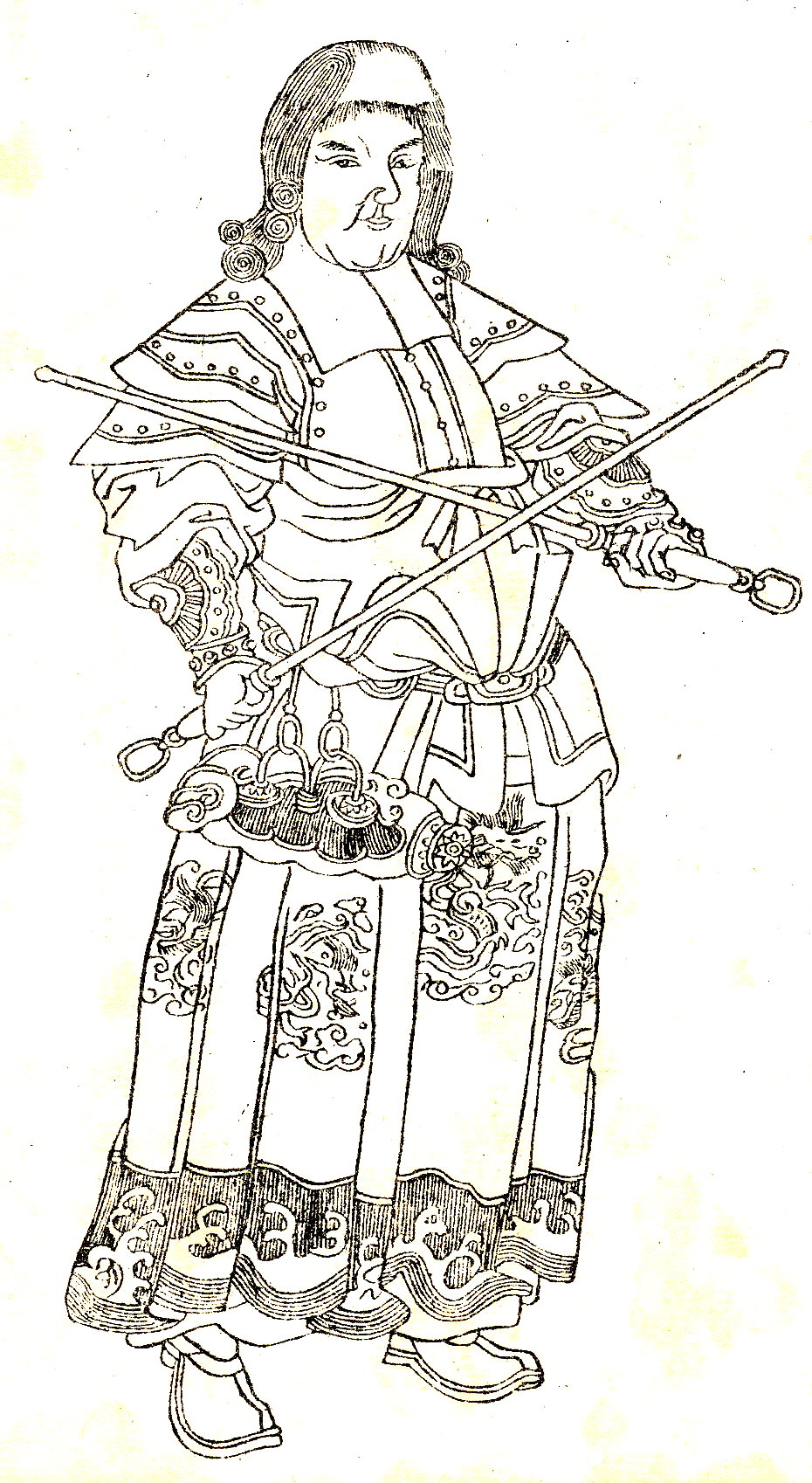
- Born: 1008
- Died: 1057 (aged 48–49); Zhoukou, Henan
- Occupation: Military general
- Children: Di Zi (狄諮), son; Di Yong (狄詠), son

Di Qing
- Chinese: 狄青
Transcriptions
Standard Mandarin
- Hanyu Pinyin: Dí Qīng
- Wade–Giles: Ti^{2} Ch'ing^{1}
Yue: Cantonese
- Yale Romanization: Dik^{6} Ching^{1}
- Jyutping: Dik^{6} Cing^{1}

Di Qing (1008–1057), formerly romanized as Ti Ch'ing, was a Chinese military general of the Northern Song dynasty. He often wore a mask in battle. He led campaigns against the Western Xia and the Nong Zhigao rebellion in Guangxi. He was known for his bravery and skill in warfare, achieving numerous remarkable feats on the battlefield. He held high official positions, including that of the Grand Preceptor. He was also posthumously honored with the titles of Chancellor of the Imperial Secretariat and Chancellor of the Imperial Ministry. In folklore, he was believed to be an incarnation of the God of Military Arts (Wuquxing).

== Biography ==
Di Qing was born to a poor family in Xihe, Fenzhou (汾州西河; present-day Fenyang, Shanxi). He sported tattoos on his face and excelled in mounted archery. In 1038, during the reign of Emperor Renzong of Song, Di Qing was appointed as Commander (指揮使) of Yanzhou (延州; covering parts of present-day Shaanxi). He participated in the war between Song and Western Xia. Each time he went to war, he would don a bronze mask and let his hair run wild and disheveled, charging onto the battlefield. Di Qing was known to be close to Song ministers such as Yin Zhu (尹洙), Han Qi (韓琦) and Fan Zhongyan. Fan Zhongyan once presented Di Qing a copy of the Zuo Zhuan and advised him to read. Di Qing took up scholarly pursuits and became a versed military strategist. He was later promoted to Assistant Commissioner of the Bureau of Military Affairs (樞密副使) for his contributions. Di Qing participated in a total of 25 battles in his lifetime. Of these battles, he was best known for his night raid on Kunlun Pass on the 15th day of the first lunar month in 1053. He died at age 48.

== Legends ==
Di Qing is depicted as the incarnation of the Astral God of Military Arts (Wuquxing, 武曲星), while another protagonist — famous Song figure Bao Zheng as the Astral God of Civil Arts (Wenquxing, 文曲星). Three Qing Dynasty novels are collectively known as the Romance of Di Qing and are attributed to Li Yutang. The central character in all 3 novels is Di Qing. The first one is originally titled "Pavilion of Ten Thousand Flowers" (萬花樓); the second one is titled "Five Tigers Conquering the West" (五虎征西) and the last one is titled "Five Tigers Conquering the South" (五虎平南). The novels also prominently feature Yang Zongbao from the Yang clan and Bao Zheng as the protagonists.

In the above fiction, his father was a civil officer named Di Guang (狄廣) and his mother was Meng Shi (孟氏). His aunt, Di Qianjin (狄千金), married the Eighth Prince, the uncle of Emperor Renzong.
