= Phục Hòa district =

Former district of Cao Bang, Vietnam

Phục Hòa District Huyện Phục Hòa
- Former District
- Interactive map of Phục Hòa District
- Country: Vietnam
- Region: Northeast
- Province: Cao Bằng
- Disestablished: 2020 (consolidated into Quảng Hòa)
- District capital: Hòa Thuận
- Subdivisions: List: 2 towns; 5 communes

Phục Hòa is a former district of Cao Bằng province in the Northeast region of Vietnam. As of 2003 the district had a population of 22,271. The district covers an area of 250 km^{2}. The district capital lies at Hòa Thuận.

Phục Hòa District was subdivided to 9 commune-level subdivisions, including the townships of Hòa Thuận (district capital), Tà Lùng and the rural communes of: Mỹ Hưng, Hồng Đại, Cách Linh, Triệu Ẩu, Đại Sơn, Tiên Thành and Lương Thiện.

On February 1, 2020, prior to the district consolidation, Triệu Ẩu and a portion of Hồng Đại were consolidated into a new commune, Bế Văn Đàn. The remaining portion of Hồng Đại was absorbed into Cách Linh commune. Additionally, Lương Thiện commune was dissolved and absorbed by the district capital, Hòa Thuận.

On February 11, 2020, Phục Hòa District was consolidated with Quảng Uyên district to form the new district of Quảng Hòa.
