= Hurun =

Hurun 湖润镇
- Town
- Location in Guangxi
- Coordinates: 22°57′51″N 106°42′11″E
- Country: People's Republic of China
- Autonomous region: Guangxi
- Prefecture-level city: Baise
- County-level city: Jingxi
- Time zone: UTC+8 (China Standard)

Hurun (simplified Chinese: 湖润; traditional Chinese: 湖潤; pinyin: Húrùn) is a town in Jingxi, Guangxi, China.

== See also ==
- List of township-level divisions of Guangxi
