= Phục Hòa, Cao Bằng =

Phục Hòa Xã Phục Hòa
- Commune
- Phục Hòa commune
- Location within Vietnam
- Coordinates: 22°28′52″N 106°34′35″E
- Country: Vietnam
- Region: Northeast
- Province: Cao Bằng
- Time zone: UTC+7 (UTC + 7)

Phục Hòa is a commune (xã) of Cao Bằng province, Vietnam. It is a border trade town with Shuikou (Vietnamese: Thủy Khẩu) in China.

On June 16, 2025, the Standing Committee of the National Assembly issued Resolution No. 1657/NQ-UBTVQH15 on the reorganization of commune-level administrative units in Cao Bằng Province in 2025. Accordingly, the entire natural area and population of Tà Lùng Township, Hòa Thuận Township, Mỹ Hưng Commune, and Đại Sơn Commune were reorganized to form a new commune named Phục Hòa.
