= Bằng River =

River in Vietnam

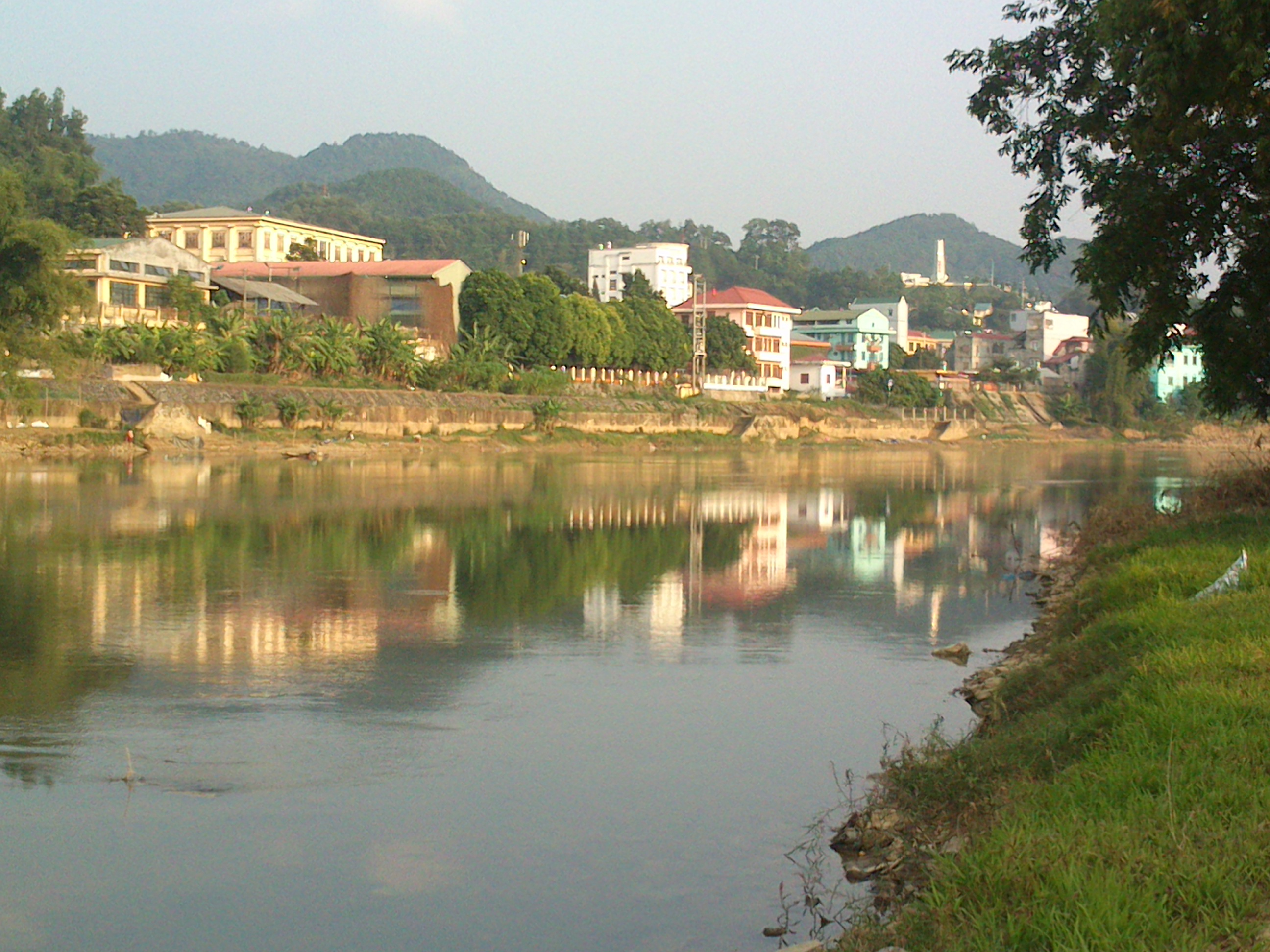
- Bang River in Cao Bang City, Vietnam.
- Native name: Sông Bằng (Vietnamese)

Location
- Country: Vietnam
- Province: Cao Bằng

Physical characteristics
- Length: 108 km (67 mi)

The Bằng River (Vietnamese: Sông Bằng (平江), Chinese: 水口河 vietnamese: Thủy Khẩu Hà) is a river of Cao Bằng Province, Vietnam. It flows for 108 kilometres.

It originates in the Guangxi, China, flows in the northwest-southeast to Cao Bằng through Sóc Giang border gate, Sóc Hà rural commune, Hà Quảng District.

From Sóc Giang rural commune, it flows in the southeast through Hà Quảng, Hòa An District, Cao Bằng, Phục Hòa District. The river flowing through Cao Bằng ends at Tà Lùng border gate, Mỹ Hưng rural commune, Phục Hòa District (at the southeast of Cao Bằng Province) before it returns to Guangxi, China.

Its confluence with the Kỳ Cùng River near Longzhou, Guangxi forms the Zuo River, a tributary to the south of Yu River.

Name Other: Bằng Giang - Thủy Khẩu Hà - Tả Giang - Quảng Tây Giang
