= A Nong =

Enlightened and Virtuous Empress of the Kingdom of Longevity
- Tenure: 1038–1039

Enlightened and Virtuous Empress Dowager
- Tenure: 1042–1055
- Born: 1005
- Died: 1055 (aged 49–50)
- Spouse: Nong Quanfu
- Issue: Nong Zhigao (儂智高); Nong Zhicong (儂智聰); Nong Zhoguang (儂智光)
- Religion: Shamanism, Animism

A Nong (also A Nùng, Chinese: 阿儂; c. 1005 – 1055) was a Zhuang shamaness, matriarch and warrior. She was the mother of the warlord Nong Zhigao (1025–1055). Alongside her son, father, and husband, she led the Zhuang and Nùng minorities of the Sino-Vietnamese frontier against Vietnamese and Chinese foes.

== Life ==
A Nong was born around 1005, the daughter of a chieftain who was enfeoffed as a zhou-level official by the Han Chinese. Her brother, Nong Dang-dao, inherited the Zhuang heartland region. A Nong married the chieftain and zhou-level official Nong Quan-fu (Nùng Tồn Phúc) around 1020. She had several children, chief among them Nong Zhigao (born 1025).

According to a legend of Zhetu villagers from Guangnan County, A Nong was both brave and wise. She is called Yah Woeng (Powerful Mother), with the legend recounting that she became accidentally pregnant one day. Her husband was unknown to her, as he always visited her at night. Per her father's suggestion, she tied a silk thread to his leg one night, only to discover the thread tied to the leg of one of their family dogs. Before fleeing to escape the wrath of her father, the dog told her that she would give birth when she met a deer. She gave birth, though when she met a buffalo. The legend relates that her son, Nong Zhigao, was defeated by a Chinese emperor because he was born prematurely.

Although the History of Song describes A Nong as a shamaness who engaged in magic, including ritual human sacrifice, but Confucian prejudices may color the data. The Zhuang gender system was egalitarian, relative to Confucian orthodoxy. Confucian historians usually minimized or ignored powerful women, attributing their actions to their fathers, husbands, or sons. But the importance of Zhuang matriarch A Nong can be perceived, despite their veil of Confucian prejudices.

Later events suggest that A Nong influenced her husband to kill his brother and take lands belonging to the Cen clan. The Nong clan then grew in power, with Nong Quan-fu founding the kingdom of Longevity (長生國) and styling himself Tu Dan Chao, the first king of Dali. In 1039, Vietnamese emperor Lý Thái Tông led an army into the region and captured Nong Quan-fu and much of his family. They were executed, though A Nong and her son Nong Zhigao both escaped.

A Nong was reputed to be resourceful; "Zhigao often asked for and adopted her strategies when conquering cities and towns. She arrogated herself the title of Empress Dowager."

A Nong and Nong Zhigao developed close relationships with Chinese traders who made regular trips from Guangzhou to purchase gold. A Nong, with a trader known as Huang Wei, advised Nong Zhigao to engage Song forces at Yong. He was successful and went on to capture Hengzhou and Wuzhou before laying an unsuccessful siege on Canton in 1052. The court of Song placed bounties on the heads of Nong Zhigao and A Nong. A Nong's head fetched a 3,000 guan bounty and an official post—a greater bounty than those placed on two Cantonese traitors. Following the mobilization of Song forces and a military defeat at Yong, A Nong and Nong Zhigao fled to Temo in Yunnan, where they attempted to raise more troops. They were caught and A Nong was executed in 1055.

A Nong led a long struggle to preserve the unity of her people, but the forces arrayed against her were too great. Zhuang women have continued to act as leaders in the region, some of them worthy successors to A Nong, including the remarkable Zhuang woman Wa Shi.

== See also ==
- History of the Song Dynasty
