= Rau peoples =

Ethnic group of ancient China

The Rau people (Zhuang: Bou^{x}raeu^{z}), also known as Lao (Chinese: 僚人; pinyin: Lǎorén; Lao: ລາວ), were an ethnic group of ancient China. Their descendants are the Zhuang, Buyei, Tày–Nùng and other Kra–Dai-speaking peoples.

== Names ==
The ethnonym and autonym of the Lao people, together with the ethnonym of the Kra-speaking Gelao people, would have emerged from the Austro-Asiatic *k(ə)ra:w 'human being'.

lǎo 獠 < MC lawX < OC *C-rawʔ [C.rawˀ]

The etymon *k(ə)ra:w would have also yielded the ethnonym Keo/Kæw /kɛːw^{A1}/, a name given to the Vietnamese by Tai speaking peoples, currently slightly derogatory. In fact, Keo/Kæw /kɛːw^{A1}/ was an exonym used to refer to Tai speaking peoples, as in the epic poem of Thao Cheuang, and was only later applied to the Vietnamese. In Pupeo (Kra), kew is used to name the Tay (Central Tai) of North Vietnam.

The name Lao is used almost exclusively by the majority population of Laos, the Lao people, and two of the three other members of the Lao-Phutai subfamily of Southwestern Tai: Isan people (occasionally), Nyaw people and Phu Thai speakers.

The name Rau comes from Zhuang raeu^{z} and means 'we, us'.

== Kam–Tai populations in China ==
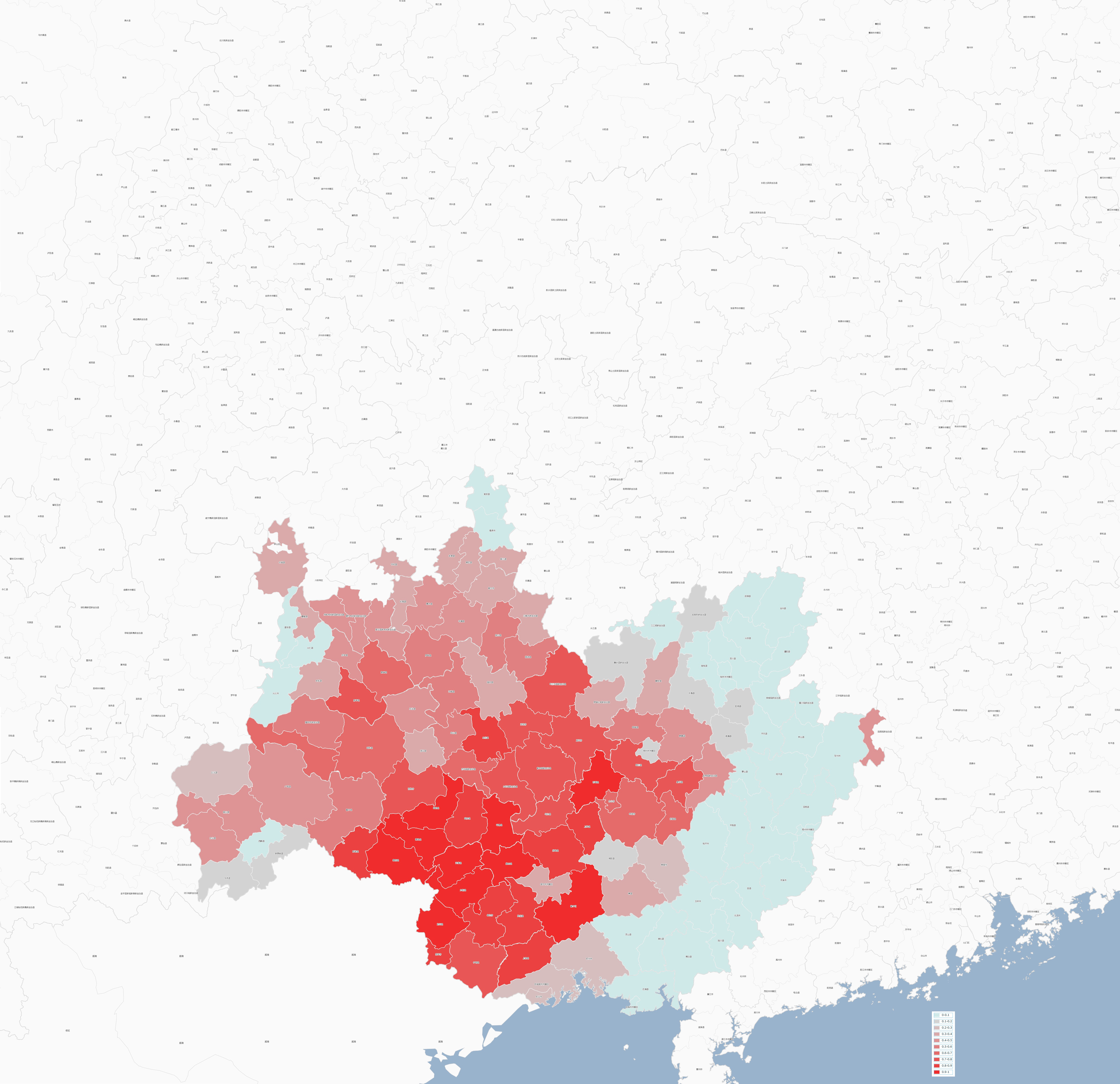
Distribution of Rau people in China: Zhuang, Buyei, Tày, Nùng, Giáy (Note: Only reflects the distribution trend, the data accuracy needs to be proven)

In Southern China, people speaking Kam–Tai (Zhuang–Dong) languages are mainly found in Guangxi, Guizhou, Yunnan, Hunan, Guangdong and Hainan. According to statistics from the fourth census taken in China in 1990, the total population of these groups amounted to 23,262,000. Their distribution is as follows:

Zhuang
Zhuang people are the largest ethnic minority in China, with a population of 15,489,630. The Zhuang live mainly in Guangxi and in Wenshan Zhuang and Miao Autonomous Prefecture, Yunnan. In addition, there are some Zhuang scattered throughout Guangdong, Guizhou and Hunan (Zhao Jia 1994).

Bouyei (Buyi)
The Bouyei people are mostly found in the south and southwest of Guizhou Province, where there are two autonomous prefectures and three autonomous counties designated for the Buyi and the Miao. There are also Buyi living in the suburban areas of the capital of Guizhou, in Yunnan, and in Sichuan. According to statistics collected in 1990, the total number of Buyi is 2,545,059 (Zhou Guomao et al. 1994). Although the Chinese regard them as a group separate from the Zhuang, a commonly held belief among the Buyi is that they are Zhuang.

Kam (Dong)
The Kam people have a population of 2,514,014. They are found mainly in Guizhou, Hunan, Guangxi and Hubei (Yang Quan et al. 1994).

Hlai (Li)
Hlai people, with a population of 1,110,900, reside primarily in Hainan (Wen Mingying 1994).

Mulam (Mulao)
The Mulao people have a population of 159,328. 80% live in Luocheng Mulao Autonomous County, Guangxi. The rest are scattered throughout Guangxi (Qin Xiaohang 1994)

Maonan
The Maonan people have a population of 71,968, mainly in Huanjiang Maonan Autonomous County, Guangxi, while the rest are scattered throughout the province (Che Rushan 1994). In the early 1990s, about thirty thousand Yanghuang (T'en) people in Guizhou identified themselves as ethnic Maonan (Zhang Min 1991).

Lin'gao
The Lin'gao people are an ethnic group clustered in Hainan who speak the Lin'gao language. According to statistics from the early 1980s, there are about 500,000 speakers of the language. At this stage, they have not been recognized as an individual ethnic group (Ni Dabai 1990). They are categorized as Han Chinese under China's system of ethnic classification.

== Other populations ==
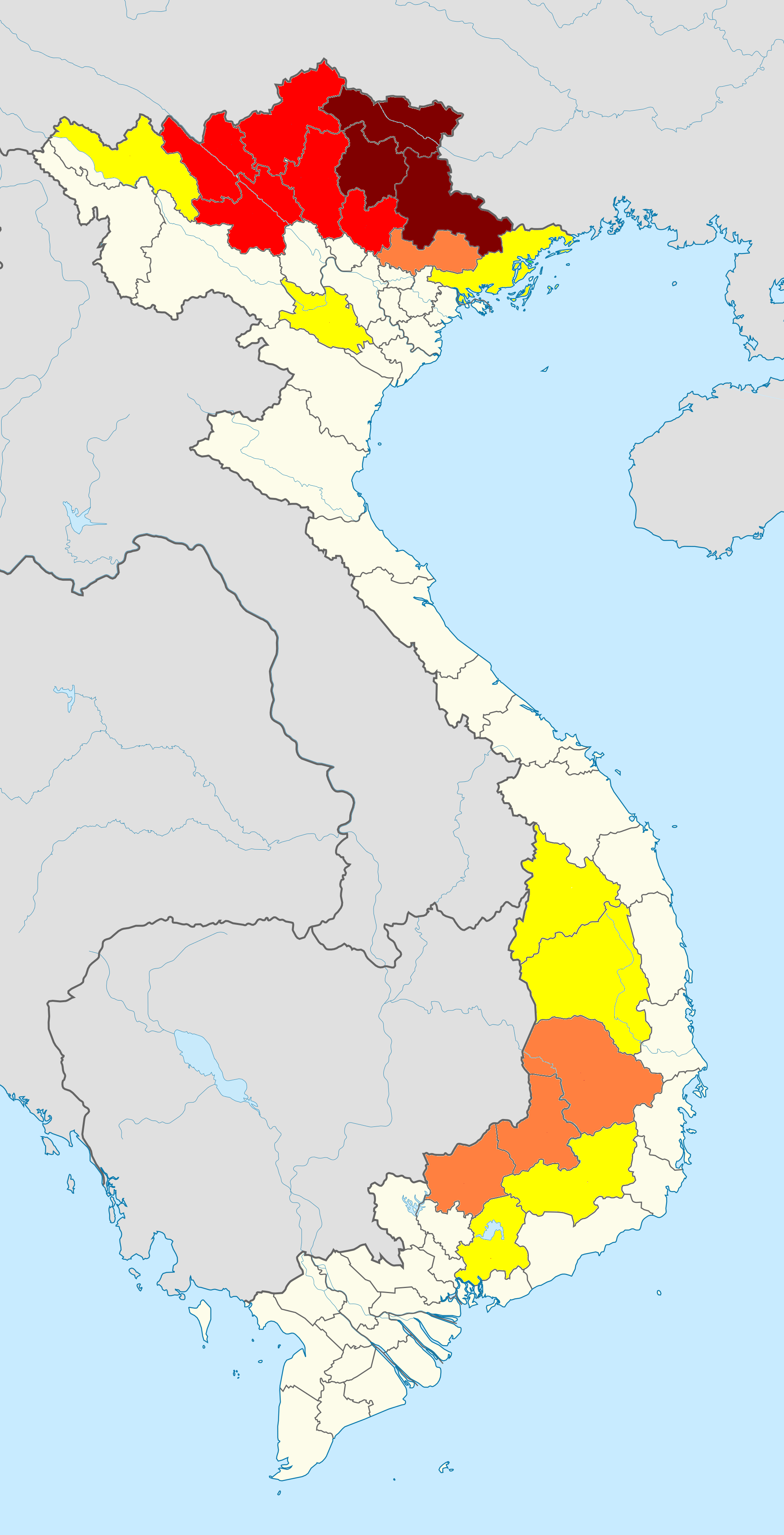
Tay and Nung people in Vietnam (excluding Thais) 60%-80%

=== Kra peoples ===
Kra peoples are reside in the Guangxi, Guizhou, Yunnan, Hunan and Hainan provinces of China, as well as in the Hà Giang, Cao Bằng, Lào Cai and Sơn La provinces of Vietnam.

=== Kam–Sui peoples ===
Kam–Sui peoples are found in China (as Kam, Mulam, Maonan, etc.), as well as in neighboring portions of Northern Laos and Vietnam.

=== Saek people ===
The center of the Saek population is the Mekong River in Central Laos. A smaller Saek community makes its home in the Isan region of Northeast Thailand, near the border with Laos.

=== Biao people ===
Biao-speaking people are found in Guangdong, China.

=== Lakkia people ===
Lakkia people are an ethnic group residing in Guangxi, China, and neighboring portions of Vietnam. They are of Yao descent but speak a Tai–Kadai language called Lakkia. These Yao were likely in an area dominated by Tai speakers and assimilated an early Tai–Kadai language (possibly the ancestor of the Biao language).

== See also ==
- Tày people
- Lao people
- Tai peoples
- Tai–Kadai-speaking peoples

== Bibliography ==
- Chamberlain, James R. (2016). "Kra-Dai and the Proto-History of South China and Vietnam". Journal of the Siam Society. 104: 27–77.
- Ferlus, Michel (2009), "Formation of Ethnonyms in Southeast Asia", 42nd International Conference on Sino-Tibetan Languages and Linguistics, Chiang Mai: 1–6.
- Pain, Frédéric (2008), "An Introduction to Thai Ethnonymy: Examples from Shan and Northern Thai", Journal of the American Oriental Society, 128 (4): 641–662, JSTOR 25608449.
