= Quảng Uyên district =

Former district of Cao Bằng province, Vietnam

Quảng Uyên
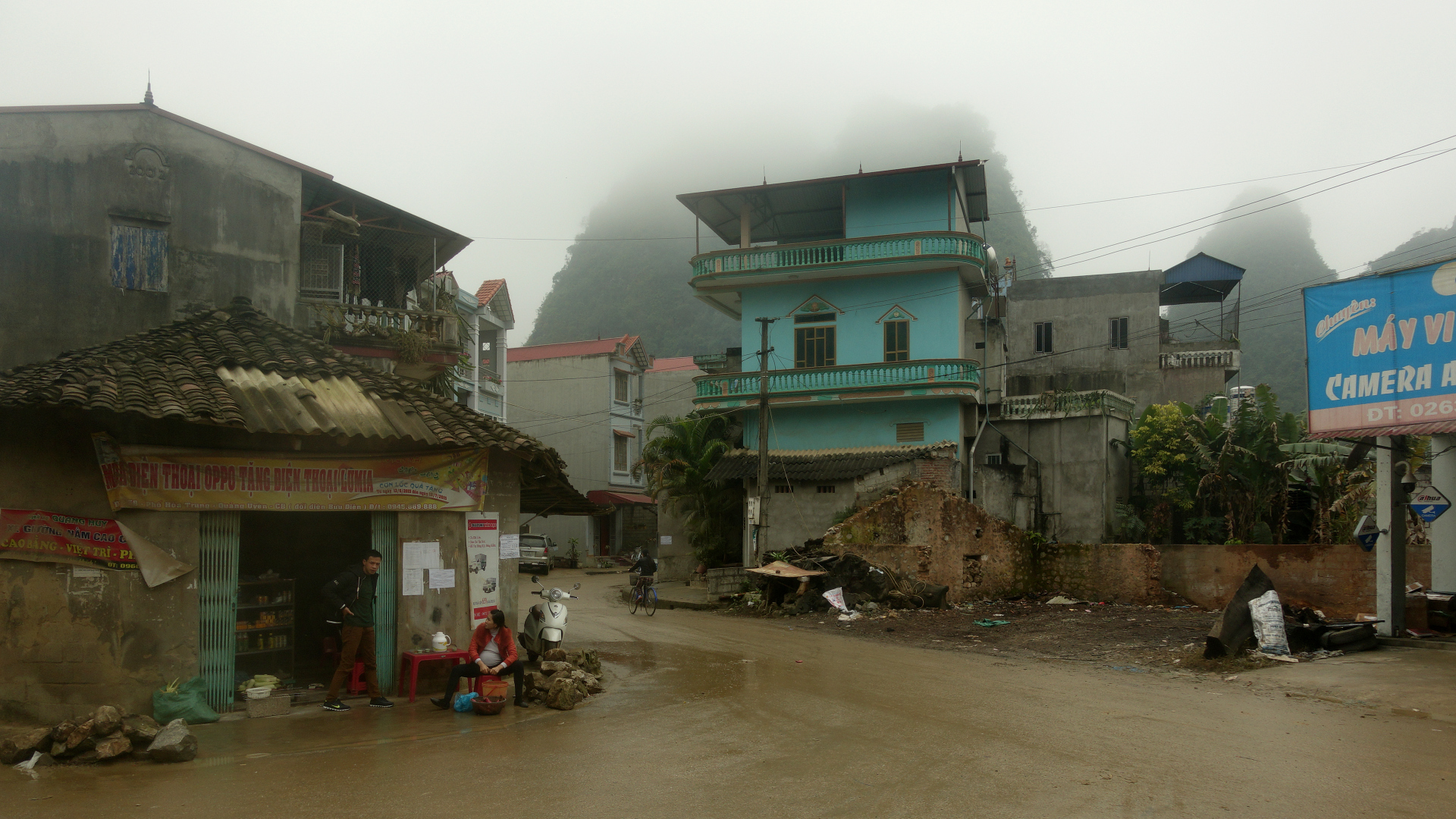
- View of a street in Quảng Uyên district of Cao Bằng Province

- Location within Vietnam
- Coordinates: 22.7042°N 106.4292°E
- Country: Vietnam

Quảng Uyên is a former district of Cao Bằng province in the Northeast region of Vietnam. As of 2003 the district had a population of 42,544. The district covers an area of 383 km². The district capital lies at Quảng Uyên.

== Administrations ==
Quảng Uyên district was subdivided to 17 commune-level subdivisions, including Quảng Uyên township and the rural communes of: Bình Lăng, Cai Bộ, Chí Thảo, Đoài Khôn, Độc Lập, Hồng Định, Hạnh Phúc, Hồng Quang, Hoàng Hải, Phúc Sen, Phi Hải, Quốc Phong, Quảng Hưng, Quốc Dân, Tự Do and Ngọc Động.

On February 11, 2020, Quảng Uyên District was consolidated with Phục Hòa district to form the new district of Quảng Hòa.
