= Kunlun Pass =

Mountain pass in Guangxi, China

Coordinates: 23°6′N 108°41′E

- Traditional Chinese: 崑崙關
- Simplified Chinese: 昆仑关
Transcriptions
Standard Mandarin
- Hanyu Pinyin: Kūnlún Guān

Kunlun Pass (simplified Chinese: 昆仑关; traditional Chinese: 崑崙關; pinyin: Kūnlún Guān) is mountain pass located 59 kilometers northeast of Nanning, Guangxi and traversed by G242. The altitude is around 300 m (1000 ft).

In 816 AD, governor of Guiguan built a stone pass at Shiguitang between Jieshou mountain and Luosan mountain and named it Xiongnan pass. During the Northern Song dynasty, it was renamed to Kunlun pass. In 1939 the site was the location of the Battle of Kunlun Pass.

== Kunlun Pass Scenic Area ==
In 1989 the site of the Battle of Kunlun Pass, in the northeast of Nanning City, was named as a regional cultural relic protection site. The area is surrounded by mountains and covers approximately 70 hectares. It includes a memorial tower and a cemetery built by the Kuomintang, and the tomb of Masao Nakamura, and includes features bearing inscriptions by many early KMT figures.
