= Cao Lạng province =

Cao Lạng was a former province of Vietnam. It was later split into Cao Bằng province and Lạng Sơn province.

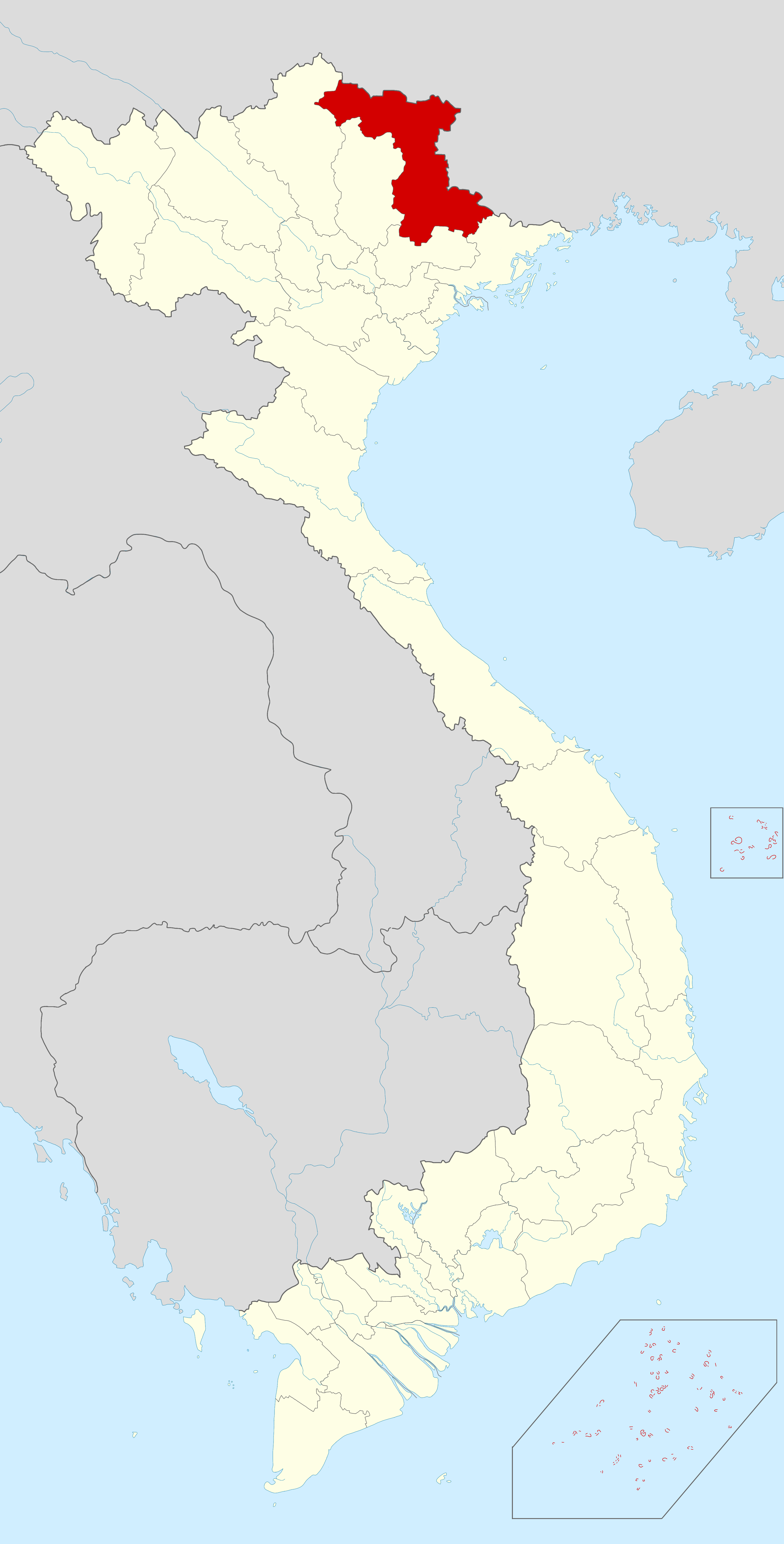
Cao Lang province (red) in Vietnam in 1976.

== Geography ==
Cao Lang province bordered on Choang ethnic autonomous region Guangxi (north), Ha Bac province (south), Quang Ninh (east), and Bac Thai and Ha Tuyen provinces (west).

== History ==
Cao Lang province was formed by the resolution of the National Assembly of the Democratic Republic of Vietnam on December 27, 1975, on the basis of the merger of Cao Bang and Lang Son provinces.

It was officially incorporated in December 1976, hosting 871,000 people and across 13,781 km^{2}.

Cao Lang province consisted of Cao Bang town and Lang Son. The provincial capital is located in Cao Bang town. Dinh Lap at that time belonged to Quang Ninh province.

At the end of 1978, GDP reached VND383 million, VND120 from agriculture-forestry. Food production reached 114 thousand tons.

On September 2, 1977, Cao Lang Radio officially broadcast the first program, including output in four languages: Vietnamese, Tay – Nung, Mong, and Dao.

Cao Lang province had 20 administrative units including: town Cao Bang (provincial capital), town Lang Son, town Tinh Tuc and 18 districts: Bac Son, Bao Lac, Binh Gia, Cao Loc, Chi Lang, Ha Quang, Hoa An, Huu Lung, Loc Binh, Nguyen Binh, Quang Hoa, Thach An, Thong Nong, Tra Linh, Trang Định, Trung Khanh, Van Lang, Van Quan.

On December 29, 1978, the 4th session of the 6th National Assembly issued a resolution to re-establish Cao Bang and Lang Son provinces. In the same year, Ngan Son and Cho Ra (now Ba Be) districts were moved to Cao Bang province. In 1996, these two districts returned to the Bac Kan) and moved Dinh Lap disrict to Lang Son province to manage:

- Cao Bang province includes Cao Bang town, Tinh Tuc town and 11 districts: Bao Lac, Cho Ra, Ha Quang, Hoa An, Ngan Son, Nguyen Binh, Quang Hoa, Thach An, Thong Nong, Tra Linh, Trung Khanh.
- Lang Son province includes Lang Son town and 10 districts: Bac Son, Binh Gia, Cao Loc, Chi Lang, Dinh Lap, Huu Lung, Loc Binh, Trang Dinh, Van Lang, Van Quan.
