= An Sơn =

An Son or An Sơn can refer to several localities in Vietnam:

- An Sơn, Bình Dương, a commune of Thuận An city, Bình Dương province
- An Sơn, a commune of the Nam Du Islands, Kiên Hải district, Kiên Giang province
- An Sơn, a commune of Nam Sách district, Hải Dương province
- An Sơn, a commune of Thủy Nguyên district of Hải Phòng city
- An Sơn, a commune of Văn Quan district, Lạng Sơn province
- An Sơn village, Đông Sơn commune, Chương Mỹ district, Hà Nội city
- An Sơn village, Kim Thạch commune, Đông Hà city, Quảng Trị province]
- An Sơn village, Hòa Ninh commune, Hòa Vang district, Đà Nẵng city
- An Sơn hamlet, Quế Thọ commune, Hiệp Đức district, Quảng Nam province
- An Sơn village, Hoài Châu commune, Hoài Nhơn district, Bình Định province
- An Sơn village, Phước An commune, Tuy Phước district, Bình Định province
- An Sơn, a ward of Tam Kỳ city, Quảng Nam province
- An Sơn, a neighborhood in Đà Lạt city, Lâm Đồng province
- An Son (archaeological site) in Đức Hòa district, Long An province

== See also ==
- Yên Sơn (disambiguation), alternative pronunciation of An Sơn.
