= Cao Bằng (disambiguation) =

Cao Bằng is a province in northern Vietnam.

Cao Bằng may also refer to:

- Cao Bằng (city), former provincial city of Cao Bằng province
- Battle of Cao Bằng (1949)
