= Mount Mẫu Sơn =

Mountain in Vietnam

Mẫu Sơn peak
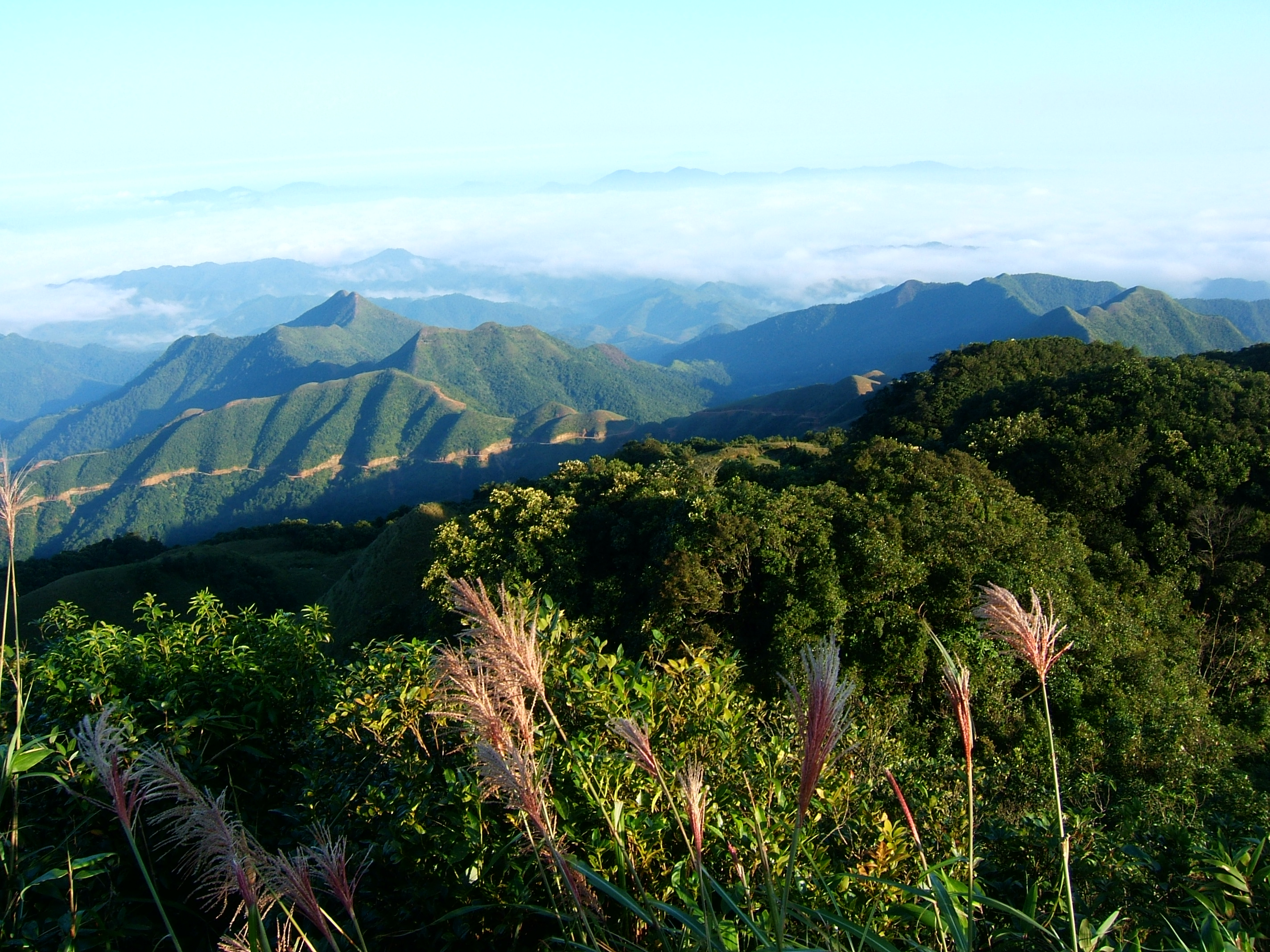

Highest point
- Elevation: 1,600 m (5,200 ft)
- Listing: Mountains of Vietnam
- Coordinates: 21°52′37.6″N 107°0′15.34″E

Geography
- Location within Vietnam
- Location: Vietnam

Climbing
- First ascent: Unknown

Mount Mẫu Sơn or officially Mẫu Sơn peak (Vietnamese: Đỉnh Mẫu Sơn) is a plateau in Lộc Bình District, Lạng Sơn Province, in the Northeastern Vietnam. It is located about 170 km (110 mi) northeast of Hanoi and about 30 km (19 mi) east of Lạng Sơn City close to the international border between Vietnam and China. The highest peak of Mount Mẫu Sơn reaches about 1,600 metres (5,200 ft) above sea level.

== History ==
Its ancient name "muaeng-mol" means "barbarian plateau" in the indigenous language, then recorded in Hanese characters as Mẫu-sơn (母山, means "Mother mountain"), which can be understood as "big plateau". (Note: Ideas from researchers Thiều Chửu, Lê Văn Lan and Lê Chí Quế.)

Mount Mẫu Sơn was originally settled by the Yao people. In the early 20th century, the French built a military base on the mountain followed by a cluster of villas in 1936. The French installations on Mount Mẫu Sơn have since fallen into disrepair and only ruins remain of the original buildings.

The mountain now contains several guest houses built to resemble French villas, some are abandoned, but a few still remain operational as of May 2017. The top of the mountain is a popular picnicking location with locals who come there to take photographs on the mountain top.

== Culture ==
Mẫu Sơn is known as the origin of one of the famous tea tree varieties in the Northern Vietnam, along with red plums and its wine.

However, since the beginning of 2010, Mẫu Sơn has become the most famous snow tourist destination in the Southeast Asia, because the snow in this place is thick enough to attract the love of the junior (thú săn tuyết, trend of snow hunting).

== See also ==
- Đồng Đăng
- Hữu Nghị Quan
