= Linh Chi =

Vietnamese artist (1921–2016)

- Born: Linh Chi; 1921 Ha Bac Province, Vietnam
- Died: 1 March 2016 (aged 94–95)
- Known for: Specialised in silk paintings
- Notable work: Red dao ethnic minority girl
- Movement: Unknown

Nguyễn Tài Lương, known by the name Linh Chi (1921 – 1 March 2016) was a Vietnamese artist. He specialised in silk paintings and used the theme of Vietnam's ethnic minorities in many of his works. Linh Chi died on 1 March 2016.
