= Yên Sơn =

Yên Sơn may refer to several places in Vietnam, including:

- Yên Sơn district, a former rural district of Tuyên Quang province
- Yên Sơn, Ninh Bình, a ward of Ninh Bình province
- Yên Sơn, Hanoi, a former commune of Quốc Oai district
- Yên Sơn, Lào Cai, a former commune of Bảo Yên district
- Yên Sơn, Nghệ An, a former commune of Đô Lương district
- Yên Sơn, Lạng Sơn, a former commune of Hữu Lũng district
- Yên Sơn, Bắc Giang, a former commune of Lục Nam district
- Yên Sơn, Phú Thọ, a formercommune of Thanh Sơn district
- Yên Sơn, Cao Bằng, a former commune of Thông Nông district
- Yên Sơn, Sơn La, a former commune of Yên Châu district
