= Đồng Tân =

Đồng Tân may refer to several places in Vietnam, including:

- Đồng Tân, Hanoi, a commune of Ứng Hòa District
- Đồng Tân, Bắc Giang, a commune of Hiệp Hòa District
- Đồng Tân, Lạng Sơn, a commune of Hữu Lũng District
