= Begonia circularis =

Scientific classification
- Kingdom: Plantae
- Clade: Tracheophytes
- Clade: Angiosperms
- Clade: Eudicots
- Clade: Rosids
- Order: Cucurbitales
- Family: Begoniaceae
- Genus: Begonia
- Species: B. circularis

Binomial name
- Begonia circularis C.I Peng & C.W.Lin

Species of flowering plant

Begonia circularis, commonly known as the ringed begonia, is a species of flowering plant in the family Begoniaceae, native to Vietnam.

B. circularis is endemic to Thach An District, Cao Bang Province, Vietnam. It is found in the cracks of mossy rocks on partially shaded limestone cliffs in evergreen broad-leaved forest, elevation 600 m (2,000 ft).

The specific epithet refers to the circular foliar variegation of the species.
