= Thông Nông district =

Coordinates: 22.833°N 105.917°E

Thông Nông District Huyện Thông Nông
- Former District
- Interactive map of Thông Nông District
- Country: Vietnam
- Region: Northeast
- Province: Cao Bằng
- Established: 1966
- Dissolved: 2020
- District capital: Thông Nông
- Subdivisions: List: 1 town; 10 communes

Thông Nông is a former district of Cao Bằng province in the Northeast region of Vietnam. As of 2003, the district had a population of 23,116. The district covers an area of 360 km². The district capital lies at Thông Nông.

Thông Nông district was subdivided to 11 commune-level subdivisions, including Thông Nông township and the rural communes of: Bình Lãng, Thanh Long, Lương Can, Yên Sơn, Đa Thông, Lương Thông, Vị Quang, Cần Yên, Cần Nông and Ngọc Động.

The district was formed in 1966 from a portion of Hà Quảng district, and was reannexed by Hà Quảng District on January 10, 2020.
