= Nguyên Bình district =

Coordinates: 22.583°N 105.917°E

Nguyên Bình district Huyện Nguyên Bình
- District
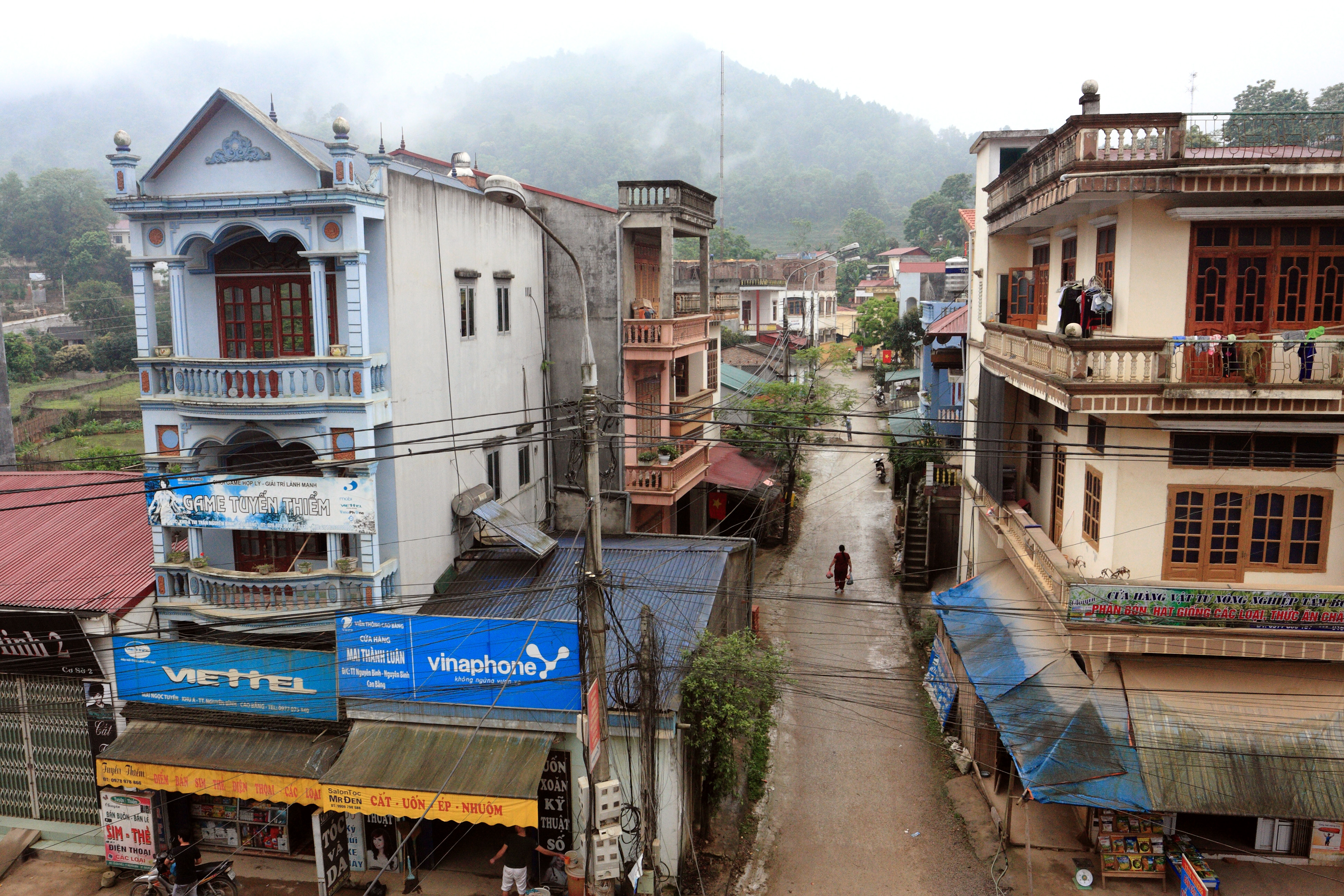
- Capital of Nguyên Bình district
- Interactive map of Nguyên Bình district
- Country: Vietnam
- Region: Northeast
- Province: Cao Bằng
- Capital: Nguyên Bình

Area
  - Total: 323 sq mi (837 km^{2})

Population (2003)
  - Total: 39,153
- Time zone: UTC+7 (Indochina Time)

Nguyên Bình is former a rural district of Cao Bằng province in the Northeast region of Vietnam. As of 2003 the district had a population of 39,153. The district covers an area of 837 km^{2}. The district capital lies at Nguyên Bình.

== Administrative divisions ==
Nguyên Bình District consists of the state capital, Nguyên Bình, and 19 communes: Tĩnh Túc, Thịnh Vượng, Hoa Thám, Lang Môn, Tam Kim, Hưng Đạo, Quang Thành, Thành Công, Phan Thanh, Mai Long, Ca Thành, Vũ Nông, Yên Lạc, Triệu Nguyên, Thể Dục, Thái Học, Minh Thanh, Bắc Hợp and Minh Tâm.

== Climate ==
Climate data for Nguyên Bình
Month	Jan	Feb	Mar	Apr	May	Jun	Jul	Aug	Sep	Oct	Nov	Dec	Year
Record high °C (°F)	29.2 (84.6)	33.5 (92.3)	34.4 (93.9)	37.0 (98.6)	37.6 (99.7)	37.0 (98.6)	37.8 (100.0)	37.1 (98.8)	35.5 (95.9)	33.4 (92.1)	31.2 (88.2)	30.3 (86.5)	37.8 (100.0)
Mean daily maximum °C (°F)	16.7 (62.1)	18.3 (64.9)	22.0 (71.6)	26.3 (79.3)	29.3 (84.7)	30.4 (86.7)	30.7 (87.3)	30.6 (87.1)	29.4 (84.9)	26.5 (79.7)	22.7 (72.9)	19.0 (66.2)	25.2 (77.4)
Daily mean °C (°F)	12.4 (54.3)	14.2 (57.6)	17.6 (63.7)	21.7 (71.1)	24.6 (76.3)	26.0 (78.8)	26.1 (79.0)	25.6 (78.1)	24.2 (75.6)	21.4 (70.5)	17.5 (63.5)	13.8 (56.8)	20.4 (68.7)
Mean daily minimum °C (°F)	9.7 (49.5)	11.5 (52.7)	14.7 (58.5)	18.5 (65.3)	21.3 (70.3)	22.9 (73.2)	23.1 (73.6)	22.5 (72.5)	20.9 (69.6)	18.2 (64.8)	14.2 (57.6)	10.5 (50.9)	17.4 (63.3)
Record low °C (°F)	−0.6 (30.9)	0.2 (32.4)	4.1 (39.4)	8.0 (46.4)	13.2 (55.8)	15.4 (59.7)	17.5 (63.5)	16.5 (61.7)	13.6 (56.5)	6.5 (43.7)	3.1 (37.6)	−1.2 (29.8)	−1.2 (29.8)
Average precipitation mm (inches)	44.2 (1.74)	36.9 (1.45)	60.3 (2.37)	93.0 (3.66)	210.3 (8.28)	297.2 (11.70)	309.8 (12.20)	310.5 (12.22)	200.3 (7.89)	108.1 (4.26)	58.9 (2.32)	36.1 (1.42)	1,761.4 (69.35)
Average rainy days	12.6	12.3	12.5	12.5	15.2	18.0	19.9	18.9	13.5	10.9	8.9	8.4	163.4
Average relative humidity (%)	83.6	83.7	83.0	81.8	80.6	82.8	84.6	84.9	82.8	81.3	81.0	81.3	82.6
Source: Vietnam Institute for Building Science and Technology
