= Cao Bằng (city) =

Former provincial city in Cao Bằng, Vietnam

- Provincial city (Class-3)
- Cao Bằng City; Thành phố Cao Bằng
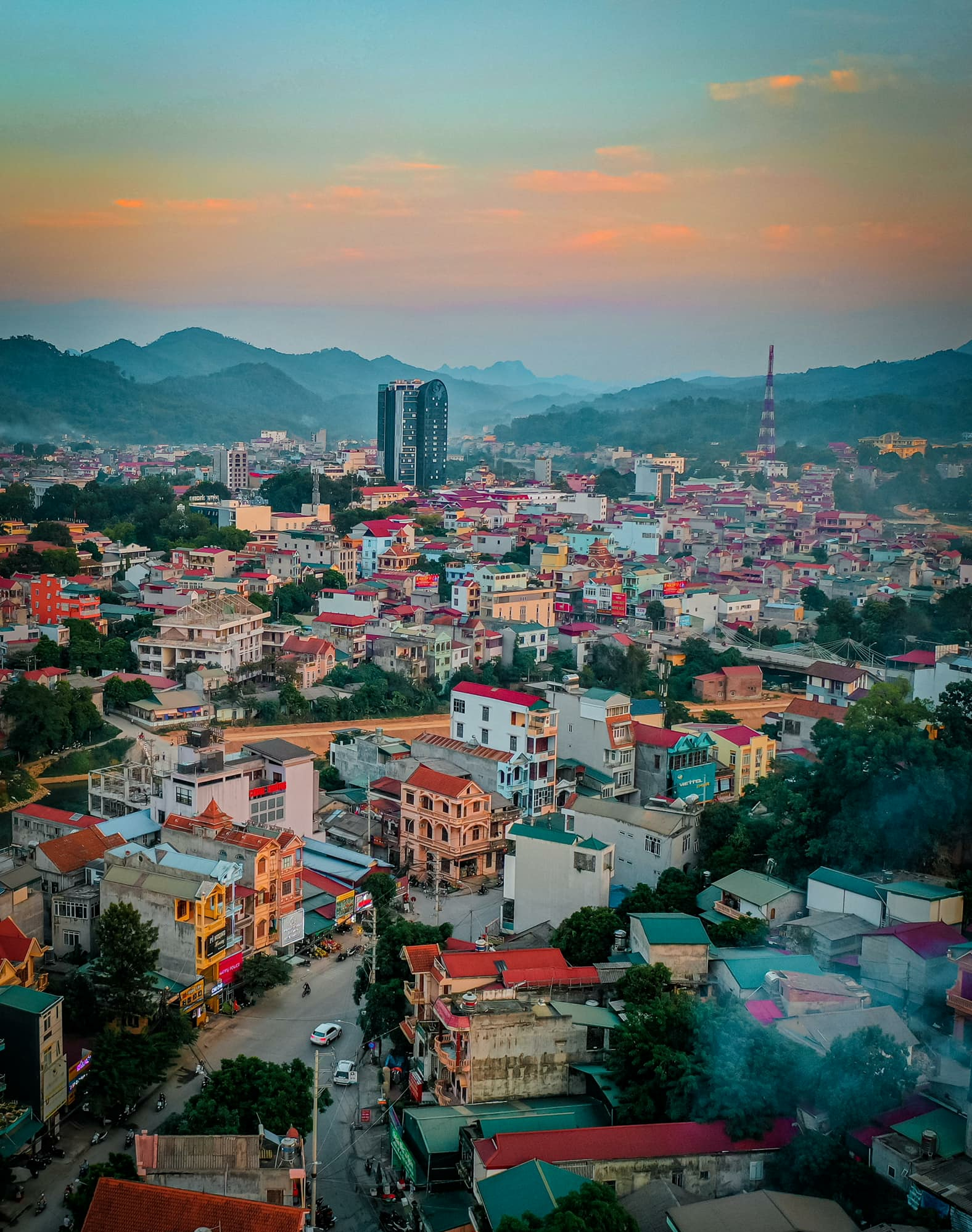
- Streets in Cao Bằng city

- Seal
- Interactive map of Cao Bằng
- Location of in Vietnam
- Coordinates: 22°40′00″N 106°15′30″E
- Country: Vietnam
- Province: Cao Bằng
- Founded: September 25, 2012

Government
  - Chairman of the People's Committee: Nguyễn Quốc Trung
  - Chairman of the People's Council: Tô Vũ Ninh
  - Secretary: Hà Ngọc Giáp

Area
  - Provincial city (Class-3): 107.12 km^{2} (41.36 sq mi)

Population (2019)
  - Provincial city (Class-3): 73,549
  - Density: 686.60/km^{2} (1,778.3/sq mi)
  - Urban: 61,955
  - Ethnicities: Kinh; Tày; Nùng; Chinese
- Time zone: UTC+7 (ICT)
- Climate: Cwa
- Website: ubndtp.caobang.gov.vn

Cao Bằng ([kāw ɓɐ̀ŋ]) is a former city in northern Vietnam. It is the capital and largest settlement of Cao Bằng Province. It is located on the bank of the Bằng Giang river, and is around 30 kilometres (19 mi) away from the border with China's Guangxi region. According to the 2019 census, Cao Bằng City has a population of 73,549 people.

== History ==
The area, Cao Bằng (高平; 'high plateau'), was the stronghold of the last years of the Mạc dynasty after their 1592 defeat at the hands of the Trịnh lords, before also being overran in 1677. During the 19th century the area was resistant to the Nguyễn government.

The city is also known for the Battle of Cao Bằng, the first major decisive victory of the Việt Minh against the French Army.

During the Sino-Vietnamese War, Cao Bằng fell for a limited time in Chinese hands.

In October 1950, Cao Bang was liberated and the Cao Bang Town Administrative Committee was established.

During the period 1954–1971, Cao Bang town included the entire Hop Giang ward (today) and the suburban neighborhoods: Tam Trung, Thanh Son, Nà Phia, Tan An.

On August 21, 1971, the Minister of the Prime Minister issued Decision No. 225-TTg on adjusting the administrative boundaries of Hoa An district to expand Cao Bang town on the basis of merging 8 hamlets: Na Lac, Na Chuong, Na Hoang, Na Ga, Na Rua, Na Phia, Na Doong, Mo Muoi and Khuoi Tit in Le Chung commune; 2 hamlets: Hoang Nga and Na Can in Quang Trung commune; Na Keo hamlet in Ngu Lao commune; 5 hamlets: Gia Cung, Na Pe, Na Lum, Thac Thum, Gia Ngam in Vinh Quang commune.

After 1975, Cao Bang town was the capital of Cao Lang province, including 4 sub-areas: Song Bang, Song Hien, Noi Thi, Na Phia.

On December 27, 1978, Cao Lang province split into two provinces, Cao Bang and Lang Son, Cao Bang town became the capital of Cao Bang province.

In 1979, the Chinese army massively attacked during the 1979 Vietnam-China border war, Cao Bang town suffered heavy damage.

On September 10, 1981, the Council of Ministers issued Decision 60-HDBT. Accordingly:

- Dissolve Song Bang sub-area to establish Song Bang ward and Ngoc Xuan commune
- Dissolve Song Hien sub-area to establish Song Hien ward and Hoa Chung commune
- Dissolve Na Phia sub-area to establish Tan Giang ward and Duyet Trung commune
- Dissolve the Noi Thi sub-area to establish Hop Giang ward.

Since then, Cao Bang town has 4 wards: Hop Giang, Song Bang, Song Hien, Tan Giang and 3 communes: Duyet Trung, Hoa Chung, Ngoc Xuan.

On October 4, 2002, De Tham commune of Hoa An district was transferred to Cao Bang town for management.

After adjusting the administrative boundaries, Cao Bang town has 5,523 hectares of natural area and 47,272 people with 8 affiliated administrative units, including 4 wards: Hop Giang, Song Bang, Song Hien, Tan Giang and 4 communes. : Duyet Trung, De Tham, Hoa Chung, Ngoc Xuan.

On October 18, 2010, the Ministry of Construction issued Decision 926/QD-BXD on recognizing Cao Bang town as a class III urban area.

On November 1, 2010, the Government issued Resolution 42/NQ-CP. Accordingly:

- Transfer 3 communes: Chu Trinh, Hung Dao, Vinh Quang of Hoa An district to Cao Bang town for management
- Convert De Tham and Ngoc Xuan communes into 2 wards with corresponding names.

After adjusting the administrative boundaries, Cao Bang town has 10,760.93 hectares of natural area and 67,415 people with 11 affiliated administrative units, including 6 wards: De Tham, Hop Giang, Ngoc Xuan, Song Bang, Hien River, Tan Giang and 5 communes: Chu Trinh, Duyet Trung, Hoa Chung, Hung Dao, Vinh Quang.

On July 9, 2012, Hoa Chung and Duyet Trung communes were converted into 2 wards with corresponding names.

On September 25, 2012, the Government issued Resolution 60/NQ-CP on the establishment of Cao Bang city in Cao Bang province on the basis of the entire area and population of Cao Bang town.

After its establishment, Cao Bang city has 10,762.81 hectares of natural area and 84,421 people with 11 affiliated administrative units, including 8 wards and 3 communes.

== Tourist ==
Burning grass hill (Đồi cỏ cháy): The road to the Ba Quang burnt grass hill area is quite convenient. The distance from Thanh Nhat town (Ha Lang) to the hill area is about 6–7 km of concrete road, which can be traveled by motorbike or car. Tourists should note that when you reach the intersection of Khum Din hamlet, 3 km from Vinh Quy commune People's Committee, turn right onto the small concrete road and continue for about 3 km to reach Ba Quang grass hill. The road here is considered relatively dangerous and difficult to travel, so visitors should choose to travel by motorbike, especially a manual transmission or high-clearance car.

Phong Nam Valley (Thung lũng Phong Nậm): The road to the valley in Trung Khanh District is relatively accessible but winding. The distance from Cao Bang City is about 65–70 km, taking approximately 1.5 to 2 hours. Tourists can travel by private car or motorbike. Local buses do not reach the valley center directly, so visitors are advised to use personal vehicles. For panoramic views, tourists can hike to Phi Pha Viewpoint (coordinates: 22.9241058, 106.5382919), which requires a 30–45 minute climb. Accommodation is limited to homestays in Na Chang or Na Tong villages.

== Climate ==
Climate data for Cao Bằng
Month	Jan	Feb	Mar	Apr	May	Jun	Jul	Aug	Sep	Oct	Nov	Dec	Year
Record high °C (°F)	32.3 (90.1)	35.9 (96.6)	37.1 (98.8)	39.9 (103.8)	40.6 (105.1)	40.5 (104.9)	38.7 (101.7)	39.1 (102.4)	37.8 (100.0)	36.9 (98.4)	34.4 (93.9)	32.3 (90.1)	40.6 (105.1)
Mean daily maximum °C (°F)	18.4 (65.1)	20.0 (68.0)	23.4 (74.1)	27.9 (82.2)	31.2 (88.2)	32.2 (90.0)	32.5 (90.5)	32.3 (90.1)	31.4 (88.5)	28.5 (83.3)	24.6 (76.3)	20.8 (69.4)	26.9 (80.4)
Daily mean °C (°F)	13.8 (56.8)	15.5 (59.9)	18.9 (66.0)	23.1 (73.6)	25.9 (78.6)	27.2 (81.0)	27.2 (81.0)	26.8 (80.2)	25.5 (77.9)	22.7 (72.9)	18.7 (65.7)	15.1 (59.2)	21.7 (71.1)
Mean daily minimum °C (°F)	10.9 (51.6)	12.7 (54.9)	16.0 (60.8)	19.8 (67.6)	22.3 (72.1)	23.8 (74.8)	24.1 (75.4)	23.6 (74.5)	22.1 (71.8)	19.3 (66.7)	15.4 (59.7)	11.6 (52.9)	18.5 (65.3)
Record low °C (°F)	−0.9 (30.4)	1.8 (35.2)	3.1 (37.6)	6.6 (43.9)	13.7 (56.7)	15.6 (60.1)	18.2 (64.8)	16.7 (62.1)	14.2 (57.6)	7.2 (45.0)	3.6 (38.5)	−1.3 (29.7)	−1.3 (29.7)
Average rainfall mm (inches)	29.4 (1.16)	24.7 (0.97)	47.5 (1.87)	84.3 (3.32)	194.7 (7.67)	247.1 (9.73)	257.8 (10.15)	257.2 (10.13)	138.3 (5.44)	75.8 (2.98)	45.4 (1.79)	25.1 (0.99)	1,427.2 (56.19)
Average rainy days	8.5	8.5	9.8	11.3	14.8	17.0	18.3	18.0	12.2	9.4	7.3	6.3	141.4
Average relative humidity (%)	81.1	80.7	80.5	80.3	80.3	82.9	84.8	85.8	84.0	82.6	82.1	80.4	82.1
Mean monthly sunshine hours	63.9	65.1	76.8	117.9	161.7	152.9	173.3	179.7	166.0	136.1	116.6	106.4	1,516.5
Source: Vietnam Institute for Building Science and Technology

== Gallery ==
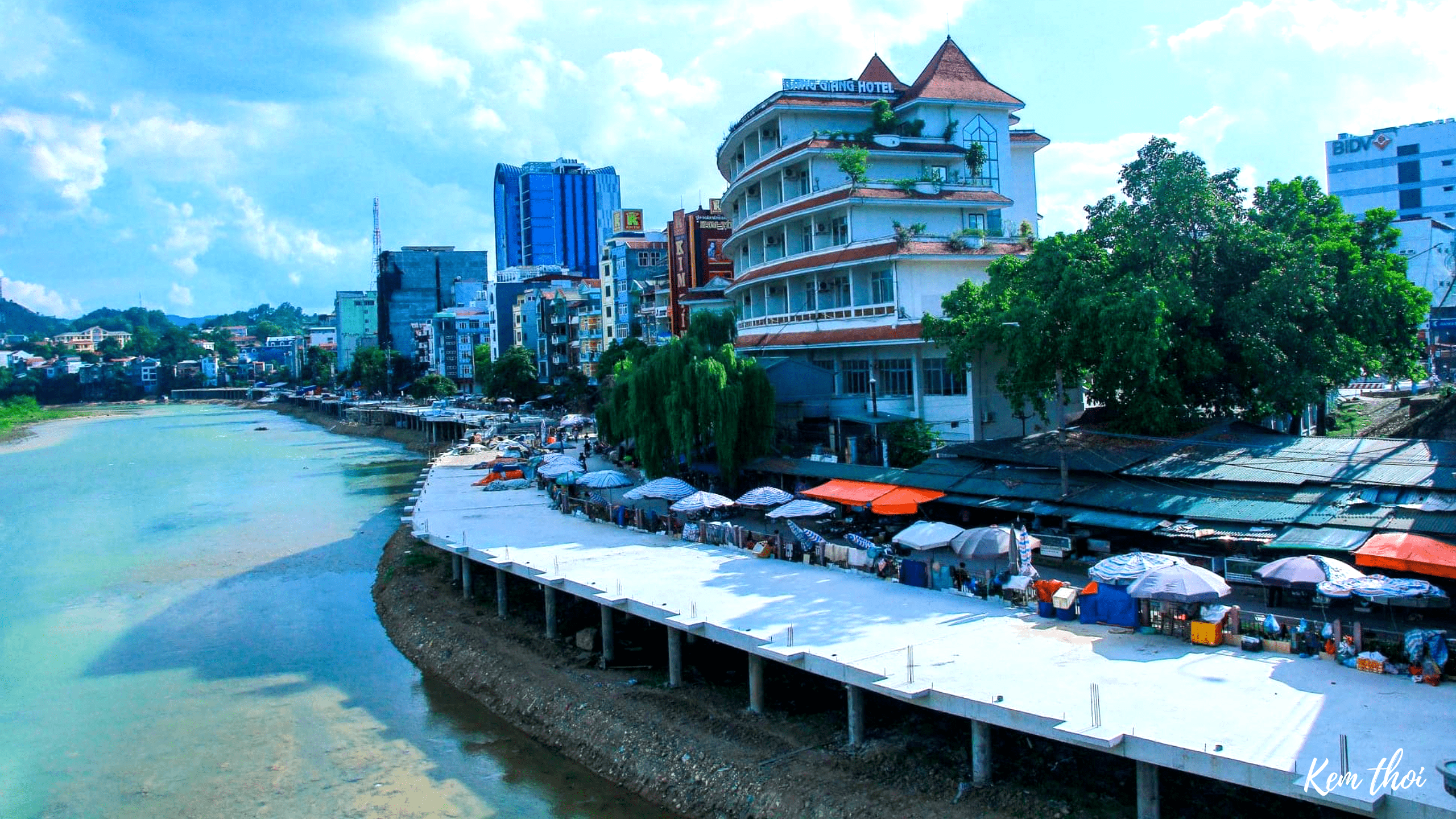
A corner of the Bằng river flowing through the center of Cao Bằng city

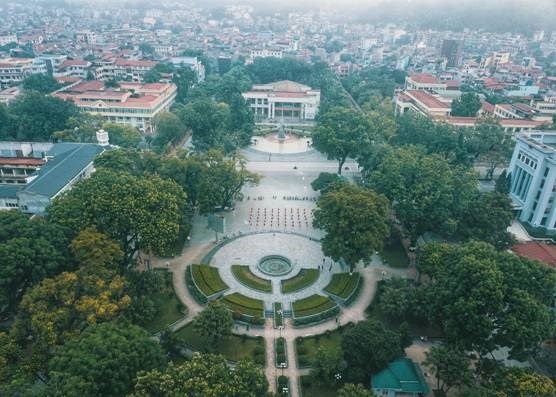
President Hồ Chí Minh's monument square

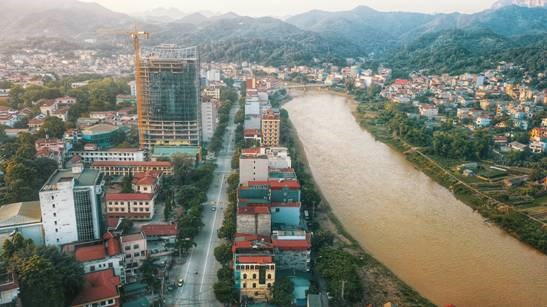
Kim Đồng Walking Street

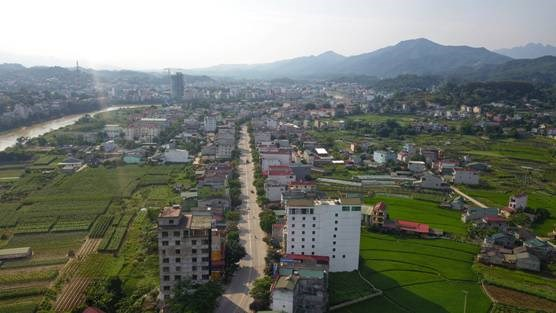
Road 3/10

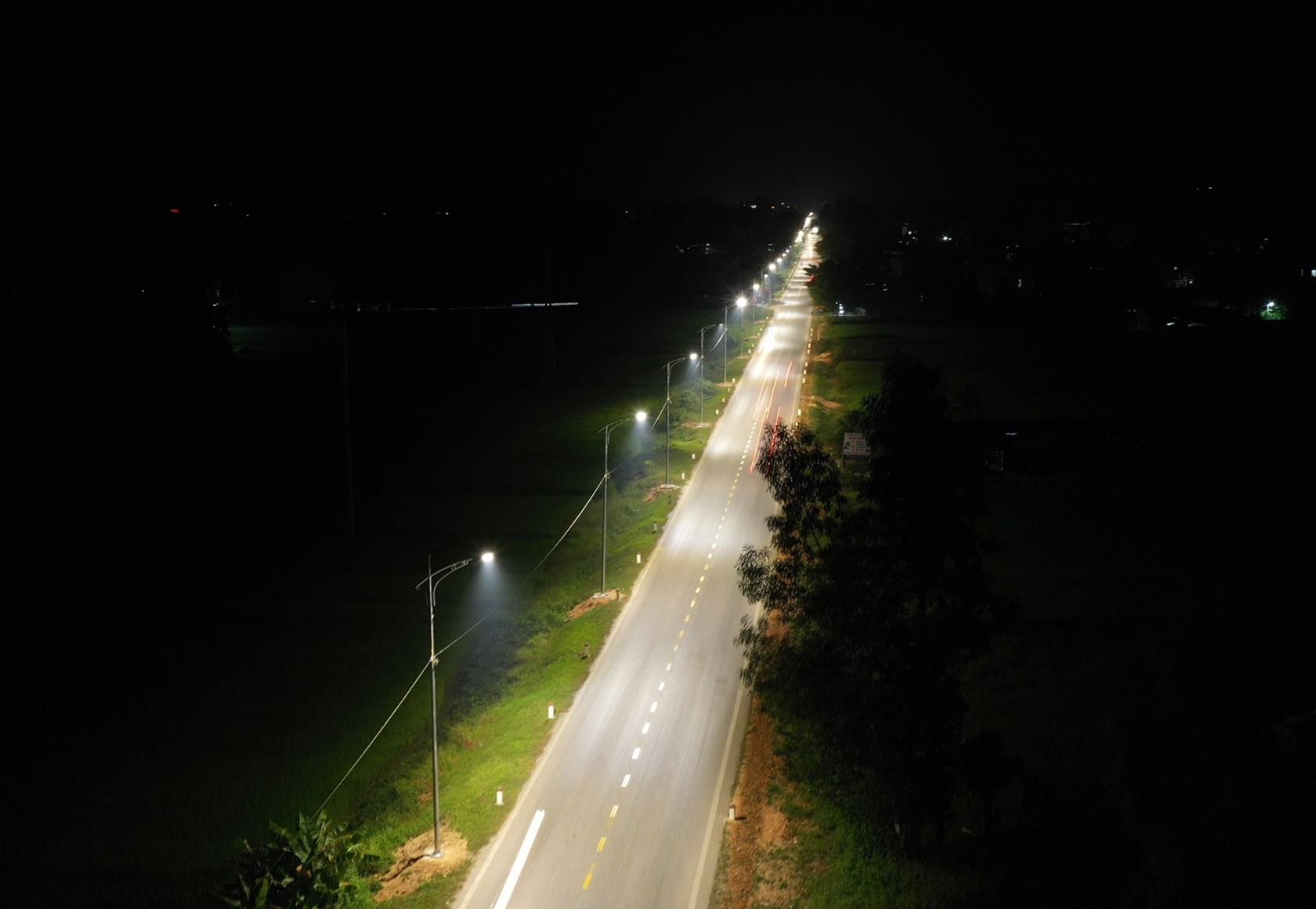
Hồ Chí Minh street lighting electrical project - Đề Thám ward and Hưng Đạo commune, Cao Bằng city

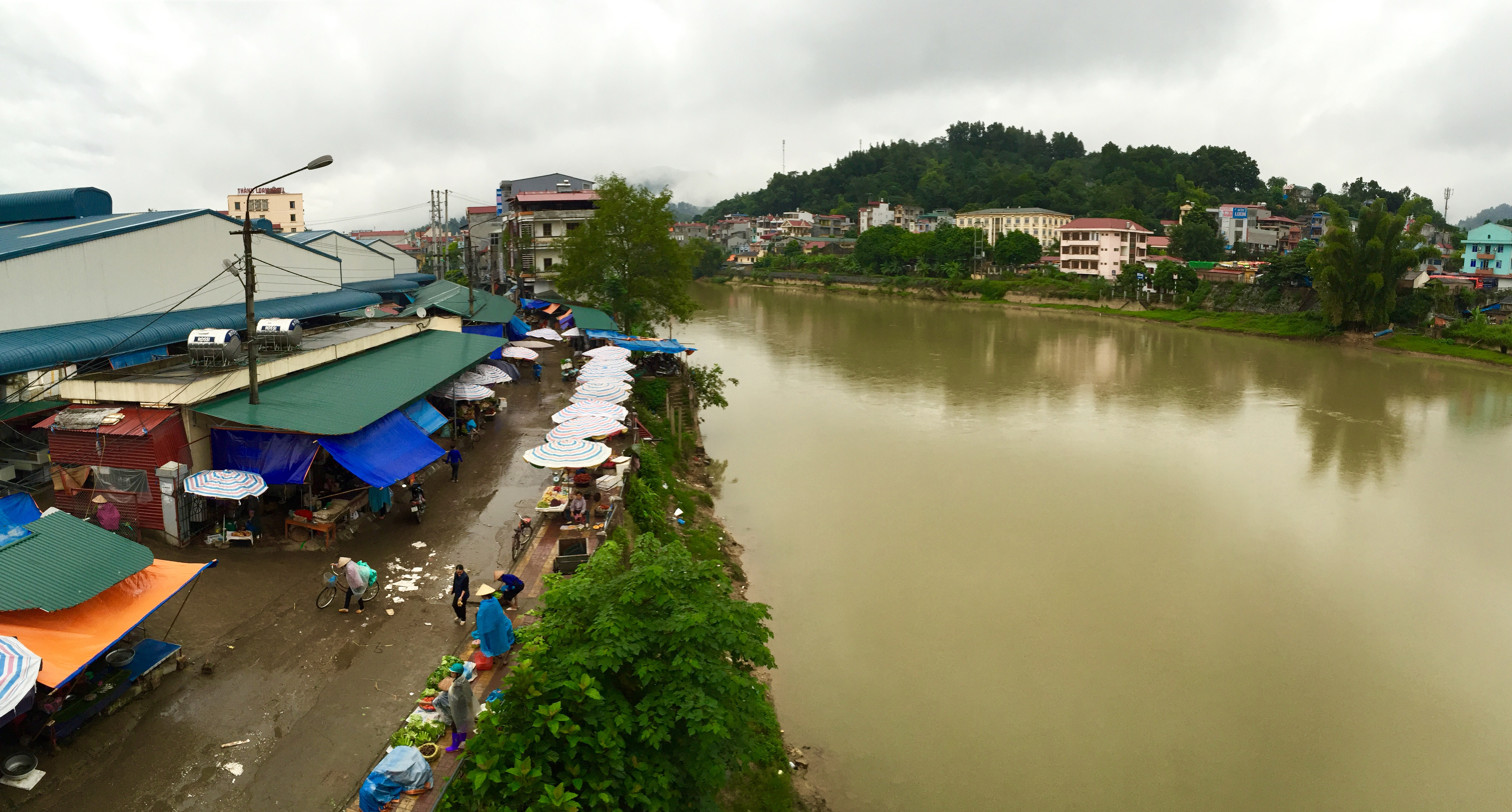
Đoạn chảy qua trung tâm thành phố Cao Bằng

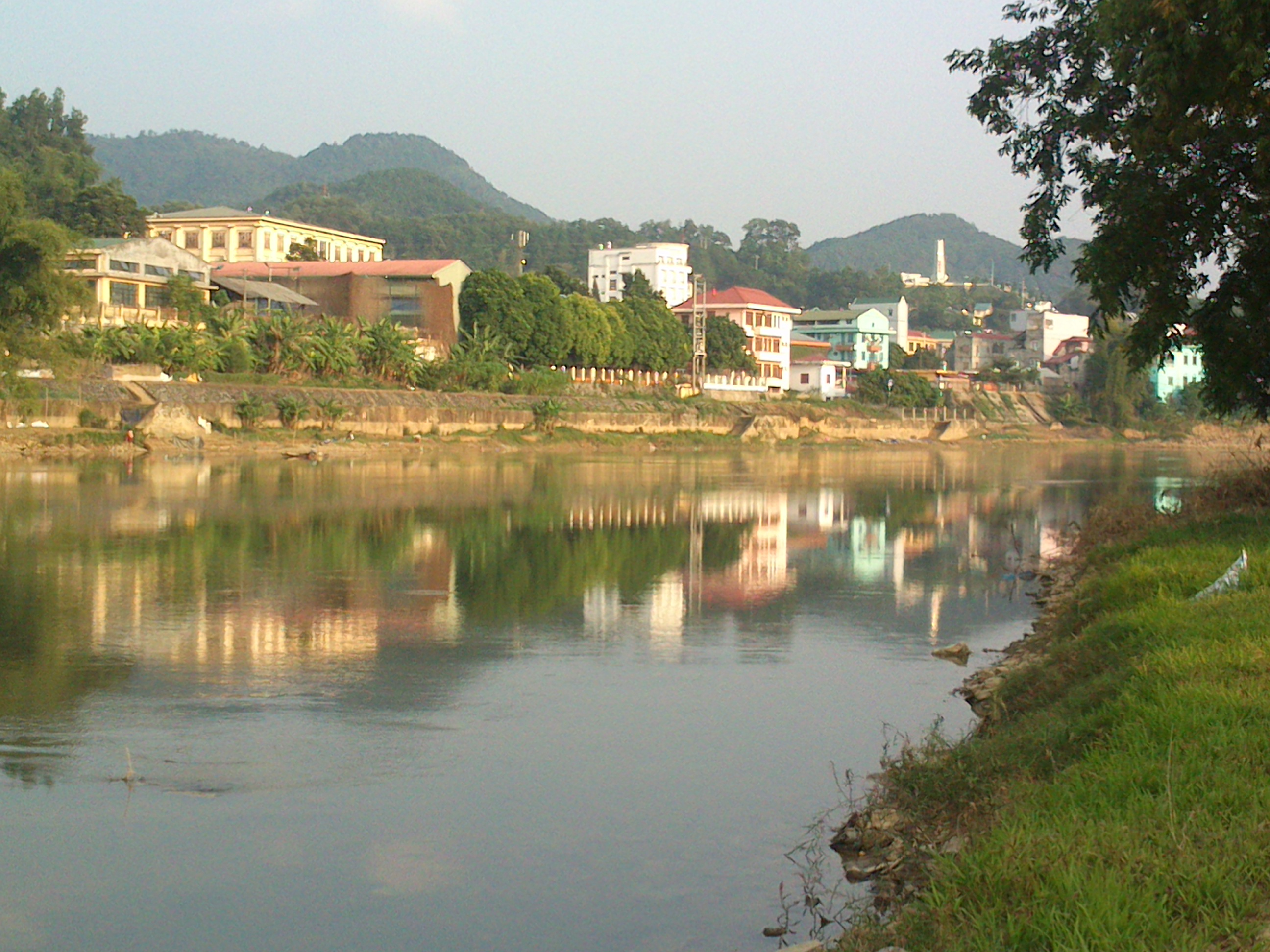
Sông Bằng Giang, đoạn chảy qua thành phố Cao Bằng

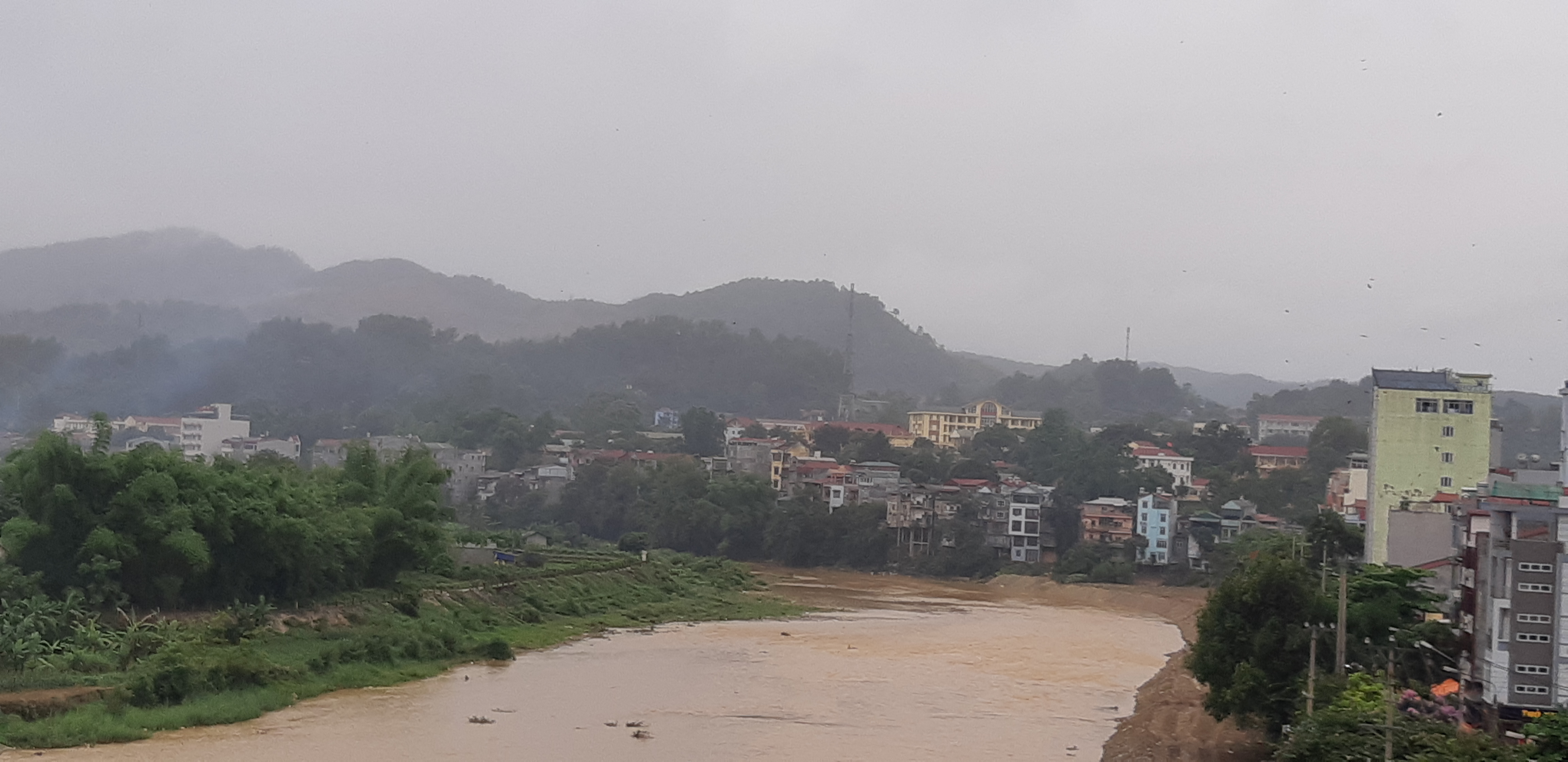
Bằng Giang river, section flowing through Cao Bằng city
