= Văn Quan district =

Coordinates: 21.833°N 106.583°E

Văn Quan district Huyện Văn Quan
- District
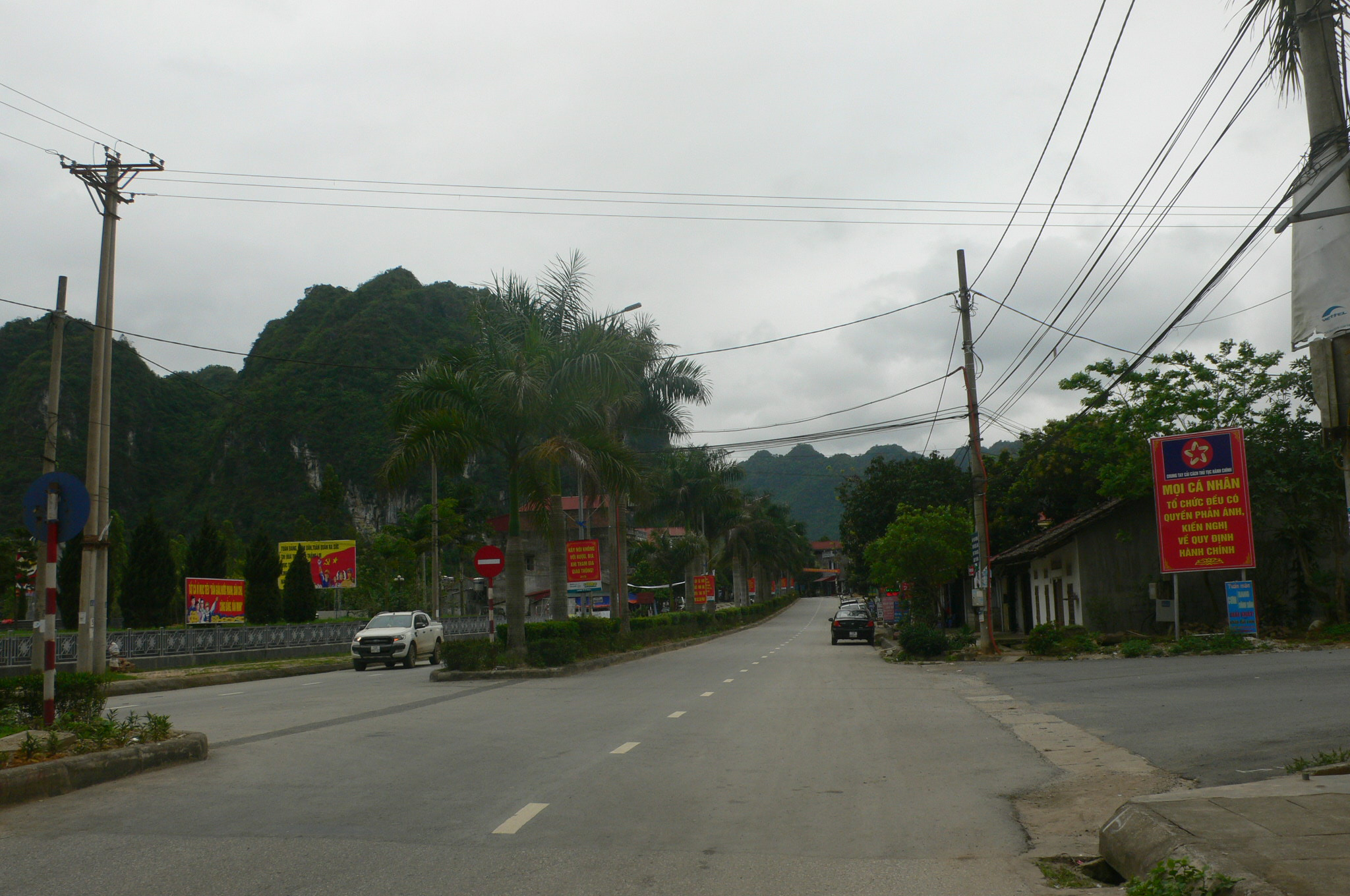
- Entrance to Tu Đồn town
- Country: Vietnam
- Region: Northeast
- Province: Lạng Sơn
- Capital: Văn Quan

Area
  - Total: 212 sq mi (549 km^{2})

Population (2003)
  - Total: 57,050
- Time zone: UTC+7 (Indochina Time)
- Website: vanquan.langson.gov.vn

Văn Quan is a former rural district of Lạng Sơn province in the Northeast region of Vietnam. As of 2003 the district had a population of 57,050. The district covers an area of 549 km^{2}. The district capital lies at Văn Quan.

== Administrative divisions ==
Văn Quan, Hữu Lễ, Tri Lễ, Yên Phúc, Bình Phúc, Lương Năng, Tú Xuyên, Tràng Sơn, Xuân Mai, Tràng Phái, Tân Đoàn, Tràng Các, Đồng Giáp, Chu Túc, Đại An, Văn An, Vĩnh Lai, Hòa Bình, Vân Mộng, Việt Yên, Phú Mỹ, Trấn Ninh, Song Giang, Khánh Khê.
