= Hà Quảng district =

Coordinates: 22.917°N 106.167°E

Hà Quảng district Huyện Hà Quảng
- District
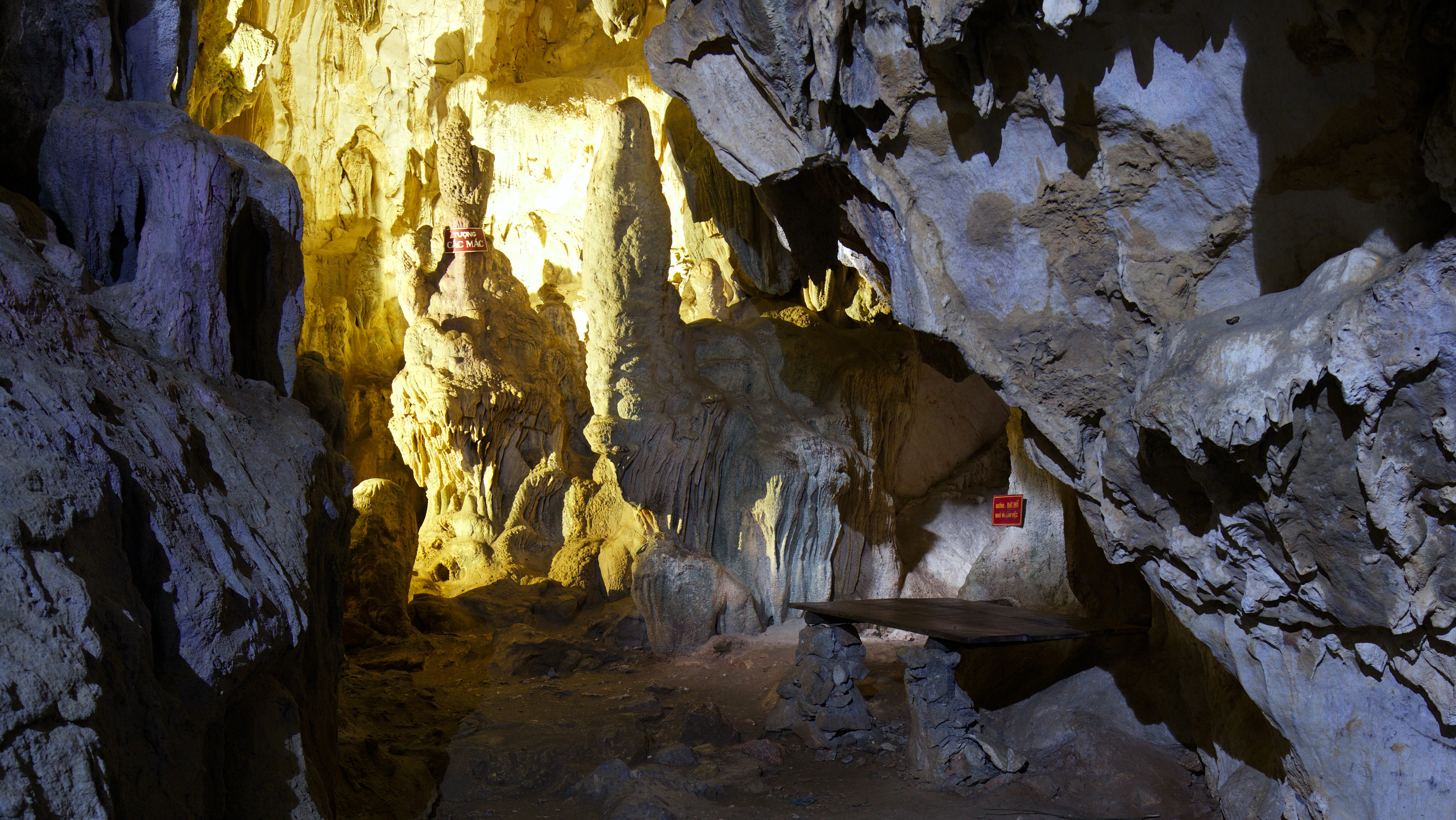
- Cốc Bó cave in Pác Bó tourism area

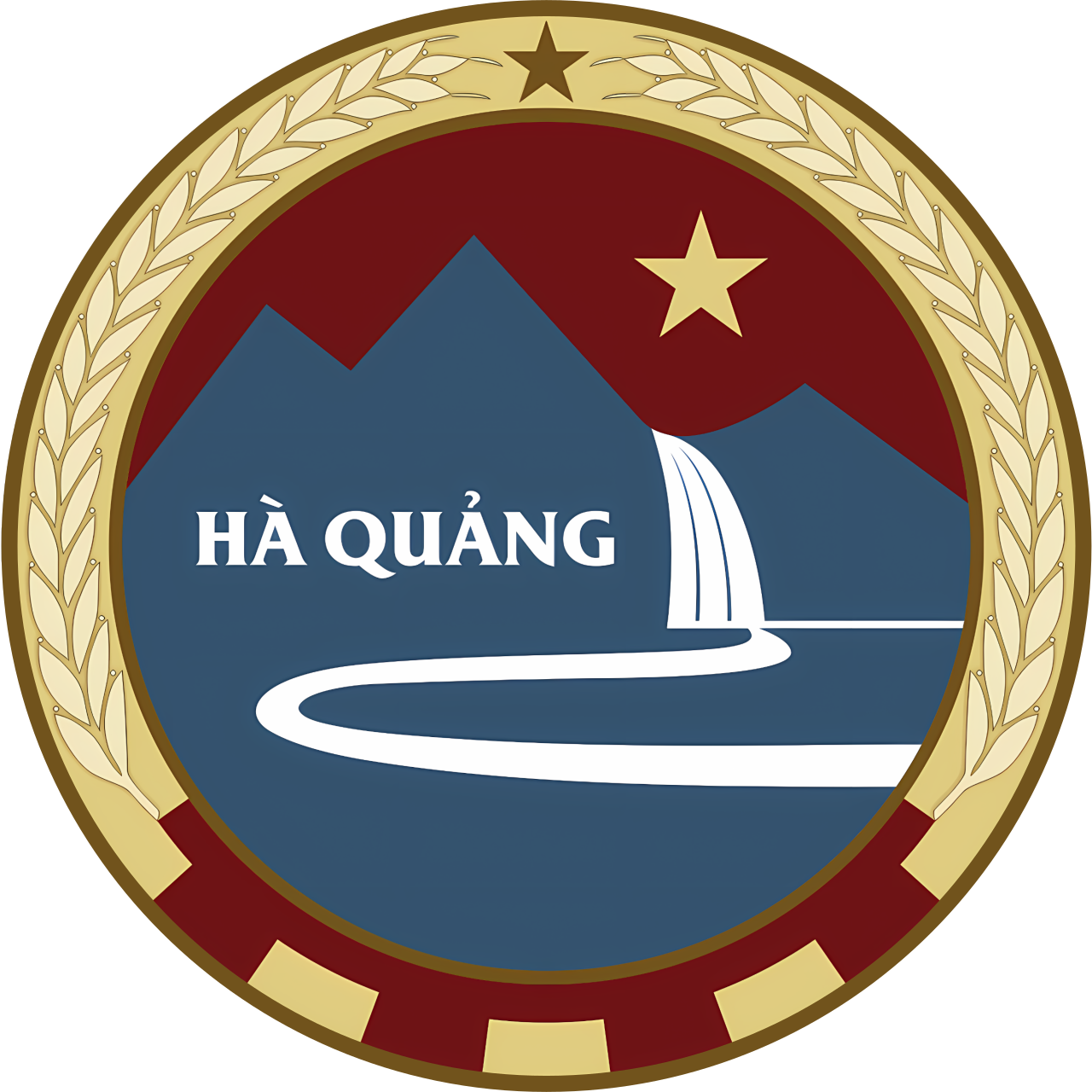
- Seal
- Interactive map of Hà Quảng district
- Country: Vietnam
- Region: Northeast
- Province: Cao Bằng
- Established: 1/7/2025
- Capital: Xuân Hòa

Area
  - Total: 313.11 sq mi (810.96 km^{2})

Population (2019)
  - Total: 59,467
  - Density: 190/sq mi (73/km^{2})
- Time zone: UTC+7 (Indochina Time)

Hà Quảng is a former rural district of Cao Bằng province in the Northeast region of Vietnam.

As of 2019 the district had a population of 59,467. The district covers an area of 810.96 km^{2} (313.11 sq mi). The district capital lies at Xuân Hòa.

== Administrative divisions ==
Hà Quảng district is subdivided to 21 commune-level subdivisions, including the townships of: Xuân Hòa (district capital), Thông Nông and the rural communes of: Cải Viên, Cần Nông, Cần Yên, Đa Thông, Hồng Sỹ, Lũng Nặm, Lương Can, Lương Thông, Mã Ba, Ngọc Đào, Ngọc Động, Nội Thôn, Quý Quân, Sóc Hà, Thanh Long, Thượng Thôn, Tổng Cọt, Trường Hà and Yên Sơn.
