= Bình Gia district =

Coordinates: 22.083°N 106.333°E

Bình Gia District Huyện Bình Gia
- District
- Interactive map of Bình Gia District
- Country: Vietnam
- Region: Northeast
- Province: Lạng Sơn
- Capital: Bình Gia

Area
  - Total: 421 sq mi (1,091 km^{2})

Population (2003)
  - Total: 54,349
- Time zone: UTC+7 (Indochina Time)

Bình Gia is a former rural district of Lạng Sơn province in the Northeast region of Vietnam. As of 2003, the district had a population of 54,349. The district covers an area of 1,091 km^{2}. The district capital lies at Bình Gia.

== Administrative divisions ==
Bình Gia, Tô Hiệu, Hoàng Văn Thụ, Tân Văn, Hồng Thái, Mông Ân, Hồng Phong, Thiện Hòa, Thiện Long, Thiện Thuật, Yên Lỗ, Hưng Đạo, Hoa Thám, Bình La, Minh Khai, Quang Trung, Quý Hòa, Tân Hòa, Hòa Bình, Vĩnh Yên.
