= Lộc Bình district =

Coordinates: 21.667°N 107.000°E

Lộc Bình District Huyện Lộc Bình
- District
- Interactive map of Lộc Bình District
- Country: Vietnam
- Region: Northeast
- Province: Lạng Sơn
- Capital: Na Dương

Area
  - Total: 385 sq mi (998 km^{2})

Population (2003)
  - Total: 80,517
- Time zone: UTC+7 (Indochina Time)

Lộc Bình is a former rural district of Lạng Sơn province in the Northeast region of Vietnam. In 2003, the district had a population of 80,517. The district covers an area of 998 km^{2}. The district capital is Na Dương.

== Administrative divisions ==
- Lộc Bình
- Na Dương
- Ái Quốc
- Xuân Dương
- Hữu Lân
- Nam Quan
- Minh Phát
- Đông Quan
- Hiệp Hạ
- Xuân Tình
- Như Khuê
- Nhượng Bạn
- Quan Bản
- Lục Thôn
- Vân Mộng
- Bằng Khánh
- Xuân Lễ
- Xuân Mãn
- Đồng Bục
- Hữu Khánh
- Mẫu Sơn
- Yên Khoái
- Tú Mịch
- Tú Đoạn
- Khuất Xá
- Tam Gia
- Tĩnh Bắc
- Sàn Viên
- Lợi Bác
