= Hữu Lũng district =

Coordinates: 21.583°N 106.333°E

Hữu Lũng District Huyện Hữu Lũng
- District
- Interactive map of Hữu Lũng District
- Country: Vietnam
- Region: Northeast
- Province: Lạng Sơn
- Capital: Hữu Lũng

Area
  - Total: 311 sq mi (805 km^{2})

Population (2003)
  - Total: 114,638
- Time zone: UTC+7 (Indochina Time)

Hữu Lũng is a former rural district of Lạng Sơn province in the Northeast region of Vietnam. As of 2003 the district had a population of 114,638. The district covers an area of 805 km^{2}. The district capital lies at Hữu Lũng.

== Administration subdivisions ==
- Capital: Hữu Lũng Township (the only township in the district)
- Communes: 25 communes:
1. Commune of Hòa Thắng
2. Commune of Minh Hòa
3. Commune of Minh Sơn
4. Commune of Sơn Hà
5. Commune of Hồ Sơn
6. Commune of Tân Thành
7. Commune of Hòa Sơn
8. Commune of Hòa Lạc
9. Commune of Yên Sơn
10. Commune of Cai Kinh
11. Commune of Đồng Tân
12. Commune of Nhật Tiến
13. Commune of Minh Tiến
14. Commune of Đô Lương
15. Commune of Vân Nham
16. Commune of Đồng Tiến
17. Commune of Thanh Sơn
18. Commune of Thiện Ky
19. Commune of Tân Lập
20. Commune of Quyết Thắng
21. Commune of Yên Bình
22. Commune of Hòa Bình
23. Commune of Yên Vượng
24. Commune of Yên Thịnh
25. Commune of Hữu Liên

== Climate ==
Climate data for Hữu Lũng
Month	Jan	Feb	Mar	Apr	May	Jun	Jul	Aug	Sep	Oct	Nov	Dec	Year
Record high °C (°F)	31.4 (88.5)	34.0 (93.2)	36.8 (98.2)	38.4 (101.1)	40.3 (104.5)	41.3 (106.3)	39.0 (102.2)	38.0 (100.4)	36.9 (98.4)	36.0 (96.8)	34.6 (94.3)	31.5 (88.7)	41.3 (106.3)
Mean daily maximum °C (°F)	20.1 (68.2)	21.0 (69.8)	23.5 (74.3)	27.9 (82.2)	32.2 (90.0)	33.3 (91.9)	33.3 (91.9)	32.9 (91.2)	32.2 (90.0)	30.0 (86.0)	26.5 (79.7)	22.7 (72.9)	28.0 (82.4)
Daily mean °C (°F)	15.6 (60.1)	17.0 (62.6)	19.9 (67.8)	23.8 (74.8)	27.2 (81.0)	28.4 (83.1)	28.5 (83.3)	28.0 (82.4)	26.9 (80.4)	24.3 (75.7)	20.6 (69.1)	17.0 (62.6)	23.1 (73.6)
Mean daily minimum °C (°F)	12.7 (54.9)	14.4 (57.9)	17.4 (63.3)	20.9 (69.6)	23.6 (74.5)	25.1 (77.2)	25.2 (77.4)	24.9 (76.8)	23.5 (74.3)	20.7 (69.3)	16.7 (62.1)	13.2 (55.8)	19.9 (67.8)
Record low °C (°F)	−1.1 (30.0)	1.8 (35.2)	3.3 (37.9)	10.4 (50.7)	15.3 (59.5)	18.2 (64.8)	21.0 (69.8)	21.4 (70.5)	14.6 (58.3)	6.9 (44.4)	3.0 (37.4)	−0.8 (30.6)	−1.1 (30.0)
Average precipitation mm (inches)	26.2 (1.03)	26.1 (1.03)	52.3 (2.06)	113.0 (4.45)	180.0 (7.09)	230.5 (9.07)	260.5 (10.26)	272.3 (10.72)	164.4 (6.47)	91.4 (3.60)	36.4 (1.43)	19.1 (0.75)	1,461.6 (57.54)
Average rainy days	7.3	8.6	13.0	12.2	13.1	14.5	16.3	17.0	12.4	8.2	5.6	4.6	132.4
Average relative humidity (%)	78.3	80.1	83.0	83.8	81.2	82.8	84.2	86.1	83.7	80.7	78.4	76.9	81.6
Mean monthly sunshine hours	85.2	48.1	40.6	85.0	159.4	161.0	172.2	167.9	175.2	160.1	128.1	107.0	1,457.5
Source: Vietnam Institute for Building Science and Technology, Nchmf.gov.vn (August record high)
