= Đình Lập district =

Đình Lập District Huyện Đình Lập
- District
- Location within Vietnam Location within Southeast Asia Location within Asia
- Country: Vietnam
- Region: Northeast
- Province: Lạng Sơn
- Capital: Đình Lập

Area
  - District: 0.458 sq mi (1.187 km^{2})

Population (2019)
  - District: 28.579
  - Density: 62/sq mi (24/km^{2})
  - Urban: 6.300
  - Ethnicities: Tay Nung Kinh Dao people Shan Chay people
- Time zone: UTC+7 (Indochina Time)
- Website: dinhlap.langson.gov.vn

Đình Lập is a former rural district of Lạng Sơn province in the Northeastern region of Vietnam. As of 2003 the district had a population of 28,125. The district covers an area of 1,183 km^{2}. The district capital lies at Đình Lập.

== Administrative divisions ==
Đình Lập, Nông Trường Thái Bình, Lâm Ca, Đồng Thắng, Bắc Lãng, Châu Sơn, Cường Lợi, Thái Bình, Đình Lập, Bính Xá, Kiên Mộc, Bắc Xa.

== Climate ==
Climate data for Đình Lập
Month	Jan	Feb	Mar	Apr	May	Jun	Jul	Aug	Sep	Oct	Nov	Dec	Year
Mean daily maximum °C (°F)	18.8 (65.8)	19.7 (67.5)	22.3 (72.1)	26.7 (80.1)	30.4 (86.7)	31.6 (88.9)	31.7 (89.1)	31.5 (88.7)	30.5 (86.9)	28.2 (82.8)	24.9 (76.8)	21.2 (70.2)	26.5 (79.7)
Daily mean °C (°F)	14.0 (57.2)	15.6 (60.1)	18.7 (65.7)	22.6 (72.7)	25.6 (78.1)	27.0 (80.6)	27.1 (80.8)	26.5 (79.7)	25.3 (77.5)	22.6 (72.7)	18.9 (66.0)	15.3 (59.5)	21.6 (70.9)
Mean daily minimum °C (°F)	10.8 (51.4)	12.9 (55.2)	16.1 (61.0)	19.8 (67.6)	22.4 (72.3)	24.0 (75.2)	24.2 (75.6)	23.7 (74.7)	22.1 (71.8)	19.1 (66.4)	14.9 (58.8)	11.3 (52.3)	18.4 (65.1)
Average precipitation mm (inches)	28.0 (1.10)	26.5 (1.04)	41.3 (1.63)	95.7 (3.77)	169.8 (6.69)	229.1 (9.02)	295.7 (11.64)	281.0 (11.06)	189.2 (7.45)	93.2 (3.67)	43.2 (1.70)	18.5 (0.73)	1,514.7 (59.63)
Average rainy days	7.5	8.2	11.9	11.2	13.6	15.9	17.1	18.2	13.3	8.4	5.8	4.9	136.0
Average relative humidity (%)	79.1	81.4	84.0	84.5	83.1	85.3	86.0	87.5	85.1	80.9	78.0	76.9	82.7
Mean monthly sunshine hours	73.1	55.9	57.9	85.2	158.9	152.9	169.2	158.4	168.0	157.1	143.1	124.2	1,495.9
Source: Vietnam Institute for Building Science and Technology
