= Văn Quan =

Văn Quan Xã Văn Quan
- Commune
- Văn Quan commune
- Location in Vietnam
- Coordinates: 21°51′50″N 106°32′19″E
- Country: Vietnam
- Region: Northeast
- Province: Lạng Sơn
- Time zone: UTC+07:00

Văn Quan is a commune (xã) of Lạng Sơn Province, Vietnam.
