= Hà Bắc province =

Historic province of Vietnam

Ha Bac province on Vietnam's administrative map in 1995

Hà Bắc was a former province of Vietnam from 1962 to 1996, then from 1996 divided into Bắc Giang province and Bắc Ninh province, now it's all of Bắc Ninh city.

== Geography ==
Hà Bắc province is the central region and occupies most of the area of old Kinh Bac region, having geographical position:

- North: border with Bac Thai province and Cao Lang province
- South: border with Hai Hung province
- East: border with Quang Ninh province West: border with Hanoi city.

== History ==
Ha Bac province was established on October 27, 1962, after the merger of Bac Ninh and Bac Giang, on November 6, 1996, separated as before. When merging, Ha Bac province initially consisted of 2 towns: Bac Giang town (provincial capital), Bac Ninh town and 16 districts: Gia Luong, Hiep Hoa, Lang Giang, Luc Nam, Luc Ngan, Que Duong, Son. Cave, Tan Yen, Thuan Thanh, Tien Du, Tu Son, Viet Yen, Vo Giang, Yen Dung, Yen Phong, Yen The.

In 1962, the two districts of Que Duong and Vo Giang were merged into Que Vo district.

On April 14, 1963, the two districts Tien Du and Tu Son merged into Tien Son district.

Area 4,614.95 km2. Population 2,260,893 people (1993).

Ha Bac is a province with a very important geostrategic position on the National Highway 18A and 1A. Ha Bac and Ha Son Binh provinces are known as the gateway to the capital in the two wars against France and the US. Kep airport in Lang Giang district plays an important role on the northern border defense line.

Ha Bac is the central area and occupies most of the area of ancient Kinh Bac region, is the cradle of smooth and loving folk songs.

In early 1996, Ha Bac province had an area of 4,614.6 km2, population of 2,363,254 people, including 2 towns: Bac Giang town (provincial capital), Bac Ninh town and 14 districts: Gia Luong, Hiep Hoa, Lang Giang, Luc Nam, Luc Ngan, Que Vo, Son Dong, Tan Yen, Thuan Thanh, Tien Son, Viet Yen, Yen Dung, Yen Phong, Yen The.

On November 6, 1996, the 10th session of the IXth National Assembly issued a resolution to divide Ha Bac province to re-establish Bac Giang and Bac Ninh:

Bac Giang province includes Bac Giang town and 9 districts: Hiep Hoa, Lang Giang, Luc Nam, Luc Ngan, Son Dong, Tan Yen, Yen Dung, Yen The.

Bac Ninh province includes Bac Ninh town and 5 districts: Gia Luong, Que Vo, Thuan Thanh, Tien Son, Yen Phong.

== Notable people ==
•Vũ Miên (Headmaster of Imperial Academy, late Lê dynasty)
•Vũ Tú (sculptor)
•Nguyễn Đăng Đạo (Zhuangyuan)
•Đàm Thanh Sơn (physicist)
