= Trường Hà =

Trường Hà Xã Trường Hà
- Commune
- Trường Hà commune
- Location within Vietnam
- Coordinates: 22°54′10″N 106°04′32″E
- Country: Vietnam
- Region: Northeast
- Province: Cao Bằng
- Time zone: UTC+7 (UTC + 7)

Trường Hà is a commune (xã) of Cao Bằng Province, Vietnam.

On June 16, 2025, the Standing Committee of the National Assembly issued Resolution No. 1657/NQ-UBTVQH15 on the reorganization of commune-level administrative units in Cao Bằng Province in 2025. Accordingly, the entire natural area and population of Xuân Hòa Township and the communes of Quý Quân and Sóc Hà were merged into Trường Hà Commune.
