= Hữu Lũng =

Hữu Lũng Xã Hữu Lũng
- Commune
- Location in Vietnam
- Coordinates: 21°30′22″N 106°20′39″E
- Country: Vietnam
- Region: Northeast
- Province: Lạng Sơn
- Time zone: UTC+07:00

Hữu Lũng is a commune (xã) of Lạng Sơn Province, Vietnam.
