= Tĩnh Túc =

Tĩnh Túc Xã Tĩnh Túc
- Commune
- Tĩnh Túc commune
- Location within Vietnam
- Coordinates: 22°39′00″N 105°53′21″E
- Country: Vietnam
- Region: Northeast
- Province: Cao Bằng
- Time zone: UTC+7 (UTC + 7)

Tĩnh Túc is a commune (xã) of Cao Bằng Province, Vietnam.
