= Thông Nông =

Thông Nông Xã Thông Nông
- Commune
- Thông Nông commune
- Location within Vietnam
- Coordinates: 22°47′7″N 105°58′59″E
- Country: Vietnam
- Region: Northeast
- Province: Cao Bằng
- Time zone: UTC+7 (UTC + 7)

Thông Nông is a commune of Cao Bằng Province.

The commune was the district capital of former Thông Nông District.
