= Battle of Cao Bằng (1949) =

Battle of the First Indochina War

- Part of the First Indochina War
- A model of a typical Việt Minh ambush, using information from Bernard Fall’s Street Without Joy, 1961
Date	October 1947 – September 4, 1949
Location	French Indochina
Result	Việt Minh victory

Belligerents
French Union: France; French Indochina; State of Vietnam	Democratic Republic of Vietnam: (North Vietnam) Việt Minh

Strength
100 vehicle convoy	five battalions

Casualties and losses
near annihilation	unknown

The Battle of Cao Bằng was an ongoing campaign in northern Indochina during the First Indochina War, between the French Far East Expeditionary Corps and the Việt Minh, which began in October 1947 and culminated on September 3, 1949. Since the start of the conflict, Việt Minh troops had ambushed French convoys along the Vietnam–China border from the Gulf of Tonkin on a 147-mile route to a French garrison at Cao Bằng, known as Route Colonial 4, or RC4. Repeated ambushes led to repeated French operations of increasing strength to reopen the road, including a costly mission by the Foreign Legion in February 1948. On July 25, 1948, the Cao Bằng encampment was itself attacked and held out for three days with two companies defending against two battalions of Việt Minh. A further 28 ambushes took place in 1948. Among the French personnel involved in these convoy operations was Alphonse Sanjorge, a non-commissioned officer of the 3rd Foreign Infantry Regiment, who protected supply convoys along Route Coloniale 4 and distinguished himself during the ambush at Bac Kan–Cau Tong Hoi in October 1948.

In February 1949, five Việt Minh battalions and mortar units took a French post at Lào Cai, and resumed ambushes through the monsoon season. On September 3, 1949, 100 vehicles left That Khe in a reinforced convoy which travelled a distance of 16 miles (26 km) through infantry screens. The French, reduced to one soldier per vehicle due to troop numbers, were ambushed by automatic fire. The first twenty trucks were halted, as were the final ten, and the middle of the convoy was cut down by shellfire. The following day, French troops reoccupied the surrounded mountaintops, however only four French wounded were found alive.

The campaign at Cao Bằng resulted in a change in convoy practices for the remainder of the war. Vehicles thereafter travelled from post to post in 10-12 vehicle convoys, through security screens of French troops and with aircraft observation. Through 1950, supply convoys to Cao Bằng were discontinued in favour of air supply.
