= Thạch An district =

Coordinates: 22.417°N 106.333°E

Thạch An district Huyện Thạch An
- District
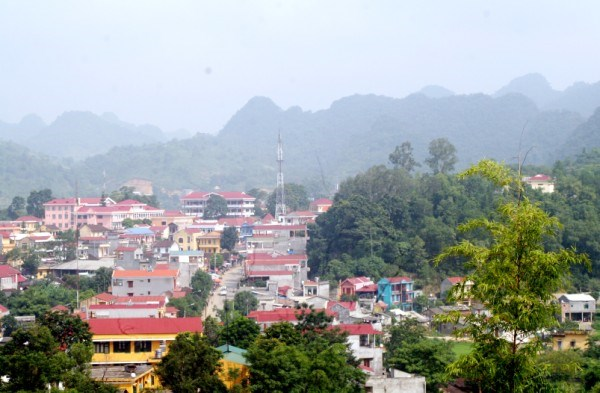
- Center of Đông Khê town
- Interactive map of Thạch An district
- Country: Vietnam
- Region: Northeast
- Province: Cao Bằng
- Capital: Đông Khê

Area
  - Total: 264 sq mi (683 km^{2})

Population (2003)
  - Total: 31,942
- Time zone: UTC+7 (Indochina Time)

Thạch An is a former rural district of Cao Bằng province in the Northeast region of Vietnam. As of 2003 the district had a population of 31,942. The district covers an area of 683 km^{2}. The district capital lies at Đông Khê.

== Administrative divisions ==
Thạch An District consists of the district capital, Đông Khê, and 15 communes: Đức Long, Danh Sĩ, Lê Lợi, Đức Xuân, Trọng Con, Lê Lai, Thụy Hùng, Thị Ngân, Vân Trình, Thái Cương, Đức Thông, Quang Trọng, Minh Khai, Canh Tân and Kim Đồng.
