= Lạng Sơn province =

Province of Vietnam

Lạng Sơn
- Province
- Tỉnh Lạng Sơn 省諒山
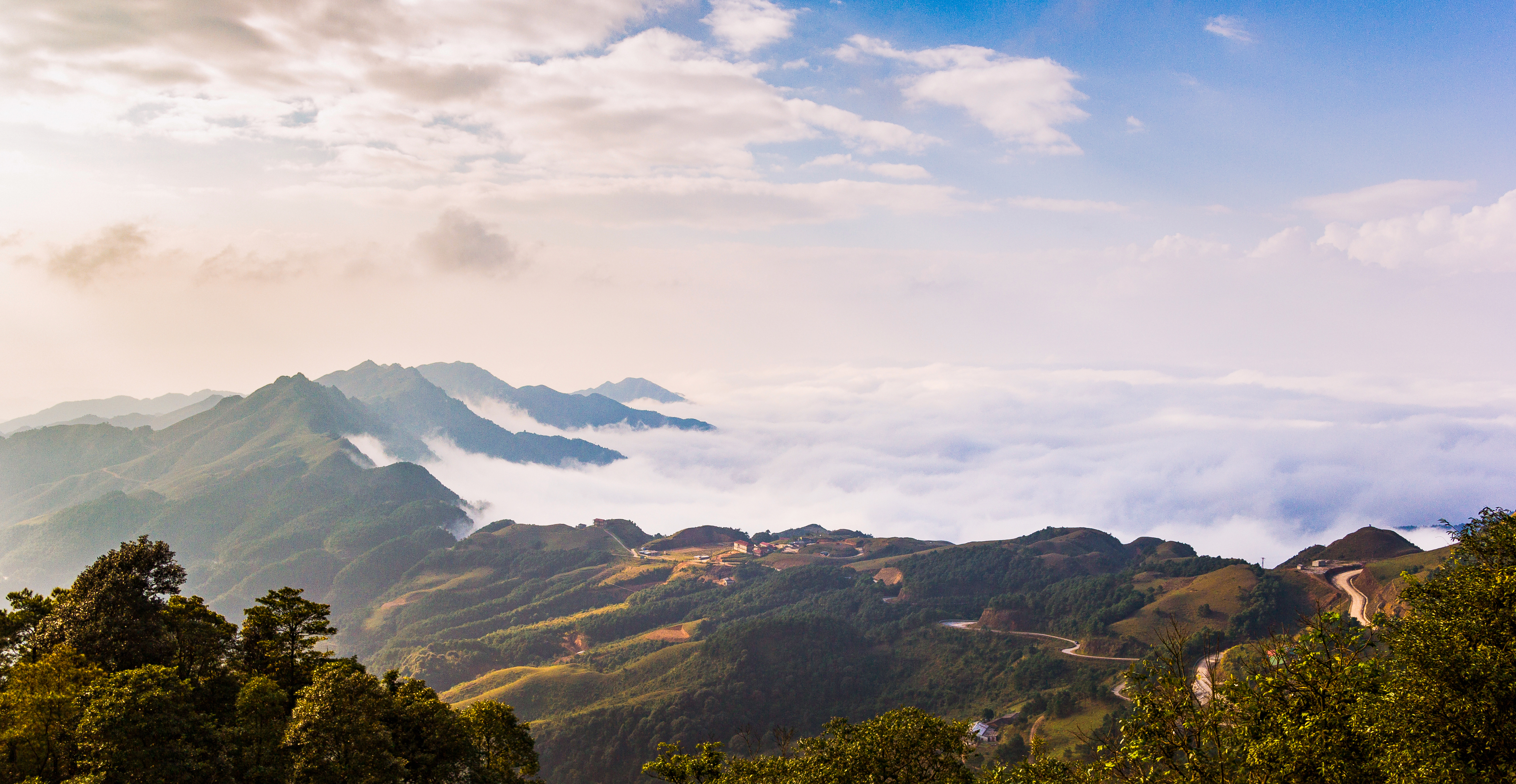
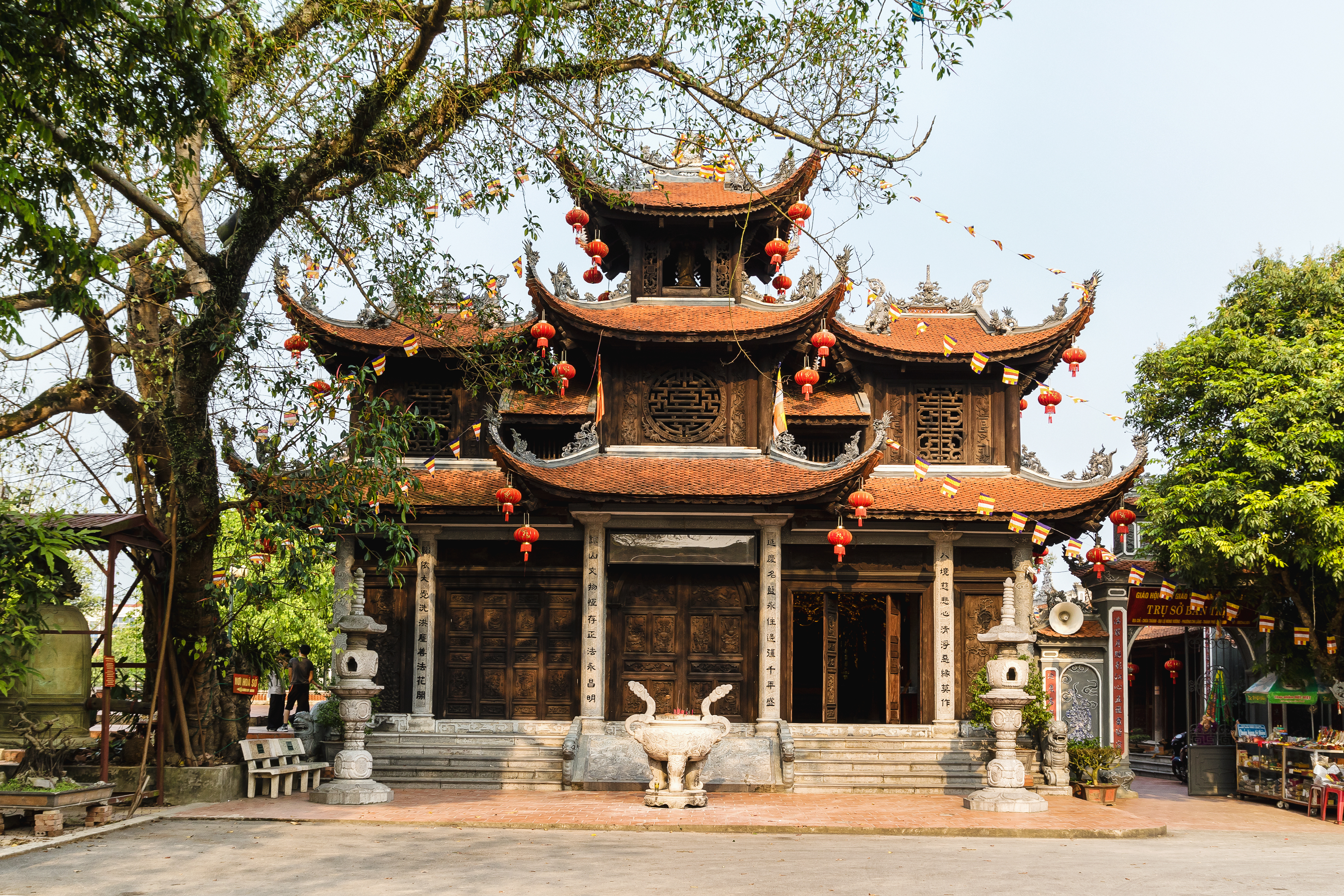
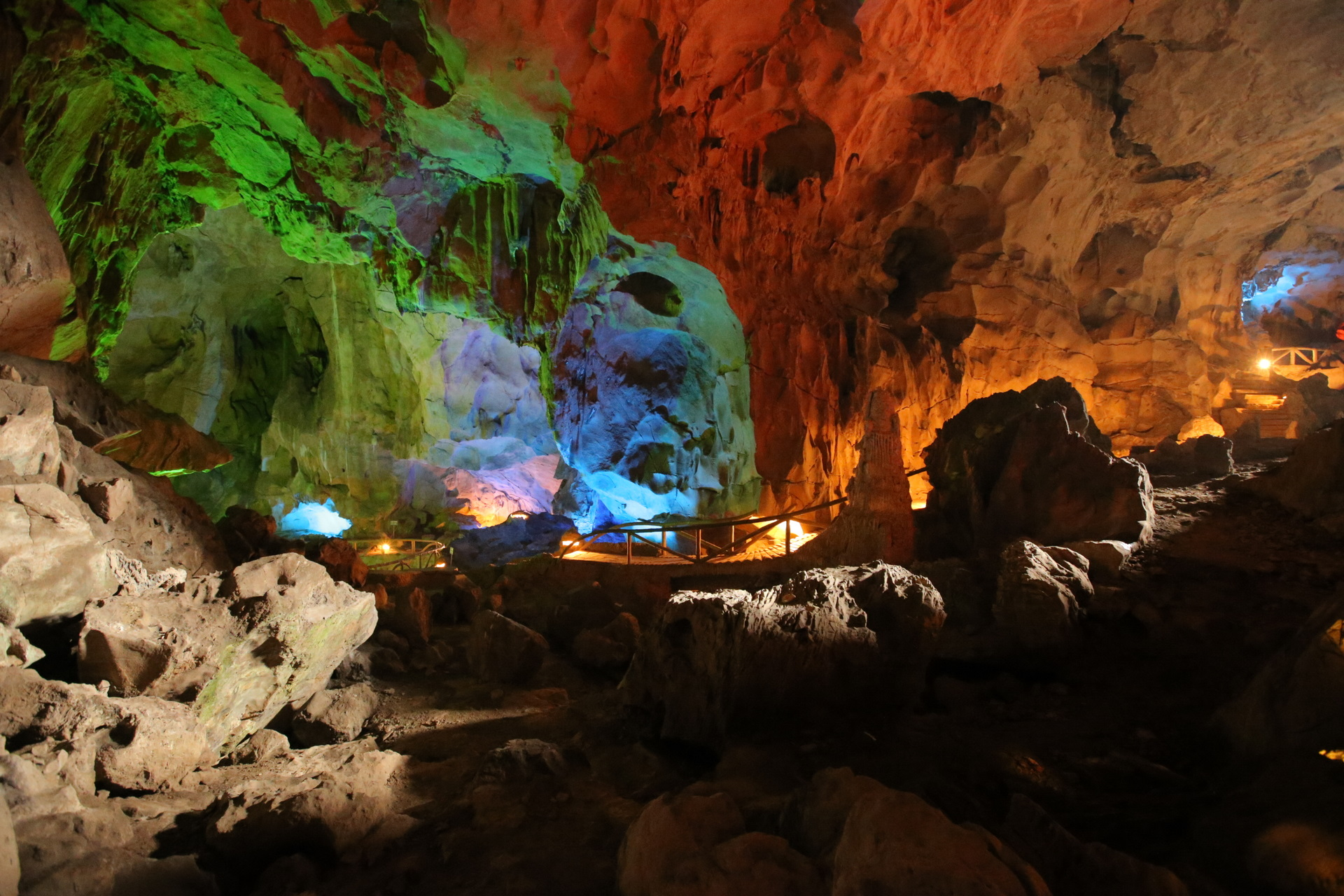
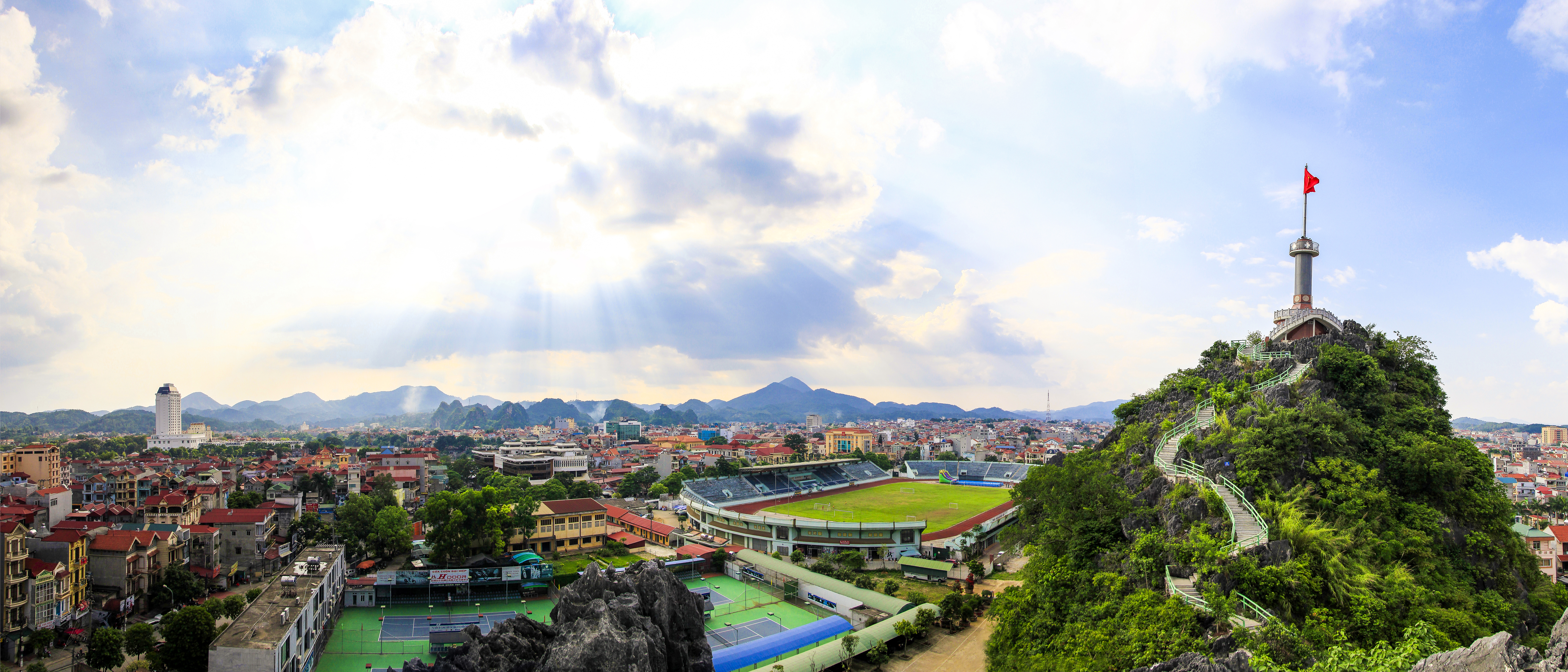
- From top, left to right : Mount Mẫu Sơn, Diên Khánh Pagoda, Tam Thanh Cave and Lạng Sơn City.

- Seal
- Motto: Ai lên Xứ Lạng cùng anh… (English: "Who come to Lang land with me...")
- Interactive map of Lạng Sơn
- Coordinates: 21°45′N 106°30′E
- Country: Vietnam
- Region: Northeast
- Central hall: No.2, Hùng Vương street, Lương Văn Tri ward
- Subdivision: 15 municipalities 10 rural districts

Government
  - Type: Province
  - Body: Lạng Sơn Provincial People's Government
  - Chairman of People's Committee: Hồ Tiến Thiệu
  - Chairman of People's Council: Hoàng Văn Nghiệm

Area
  - Total: 8,310.18 km^{2} (3,208.58 sq mi)

Population (2025)
  - Total: 881,384
  - Density: 106.061/km^{2} (274.696/sq mi)

Ethnic groups
  - Nungz: 42.90%
  - Tai: 36.08%
  - Kinh: 16.09%
  - Yao: 3.61%
  - Others: 1.32%

GDP
  - Province: VNĐ 30.355 trillion US$ 1.318 billion
- Time zone: UTC+7 (Indochina Time)
- Area codes: 205
- ISO 3166 code: VN-09
- HDI (2020): ▲0.692 (33rd)
- Website: Langson.gov.vn; Langson.dcs.vn

Lạng Sơn (Vietnamese pronunciation: [laŋ˧˨ʔ ɕɤn˧˧]) is a province in the Northeastern region of Vietnam, bordering China.

== Geography ==
=== Topography ===
The province is set in karstic limestone mountains and valleys. Mountains and forests comprise 80% of the province's area. The province measures approximately 123 kilometres from north to south and 126 kilometres from west to east. The average altitude of the province is 252 metres (827 ft) above sea level. The lowest point in the province is 20 metres (66 ft) towards the south of Hữu Lũng District and the highest point is at Mount Mẫu Sơn, which is 1,541 metres (5,056 ft). Mẫu Sơn is to the east of the town of Lạng Sơn by 30 kilometres (19 mi), and is surrounded by a series of peaks; snow sometimes falls on these peaks in winter. The Bac Son Mountains are located in the province and are calcareous in nature. Fertile valleys are framed by mountain ridges.

Lạng Sơn has two international border crossings. The most accessed is the Friendship Pass called the Hữu Nghị Quan crossing at Đồng Đăng connecting to Pingxiang town in China. This is the historical first land link in the north between China and Vietnam that connects Lạng Sơn and Guangxi, China. The border is open daily, from 07:00 to 17:00, and involves a walk of 500 m through the no man's territory between Vietnam and China. There is an international train service, an express route, opened in 1996 from Hanoi to Beijing (China), which operates twice a week on Tuesday and Friday that passes through Lạng Sơn Town and Đồng Đăng through this gate which has three-hour stop at the border town to complete formalities of entry from one country to the other. Passengers are not allowed to board the train at any intermediate station between Hanoi and Beijing.

Lạng Sơn is 155 kilometres (96 mi) to the northwest of Hanoi and National Highways 1 and 1 A and passes the Chi Lăng pass (the site of Lê Lợi's victory over 100,000 Ming invaders from China in 1427) and Bắc Giang on National Highway 1A. Lạng Sơn is 135 km from Cao Bằng on the National Highway no 4.

=== Climate ===
Lạng Sơn province has an average annual temperature of 17–22 °C and an average annual rainfall of 1,200–1,600 millimetres (47–63 in). The average temperature in the summer is 28.5 °C (83.3 °F) and 12–13 °C (54–55 °F) in the winter.

Climate data for Lạng Sơn
| Month | Jan | Feb | Mar | Apr | May | Jun | Jul | Aug | Sep | Oct | Nov | Dec | Year |
|---|---|---|---|---|---|---|---|---|---|---|---|---|---|
| Record high °C (°F) | 31.6 (88.9) | 36.4 (97.5) | 36.7 (98.1) | 38.2 (100.8) | 39.8 (103.6) | 38.8 (101.8) | 37.6 (99.7) | 37.7 (99.9) | 36.2 (97.2) | 34.3 (93.7) | 32.7 (90.9) | 30.2 (86.4) | 39.8 (103.6) |
| Mean daily maximum °C (°F) | 17.5 (63.5) | 18.8 (65.8) | 21.9 (71.4) | 26.5 (79.7) | 30.2 (86.4) | 31.5 (88.7) | 31.7 (89.1) | 31.3 (88.3) | 30.2 (86.4) | 27.5 (81.5) | 23.7 (74.7) | 19.8 (67.6) | 25.9 (78.6) |
| Daily mean °C (°F) | 13.1 (55.6) | 14.7 (58.5) | 18.0 (64.4) | 22.3 (72.1) | 25.5 (77.9) | 26.9 (80.4) | 27.1 (80.8) | 26.6 (79.9) | 25.2 (77.4) | 22.3 (72.1) | 18.4 (65.1) | 14.6 (58.3) | 21.3 (70.3) |
| Mean daily minimum °C (°F) | 10.1 (50.2) | 12.0 (53.6) | 15.4 (59.7) | 19.3 (66.7) | 22.1 (71.8) | 23.8 (74.8) | 24.0 (75.2) | 23.7 (74.7) | 22.2 (72.0) | 18.8 (65.8) | 14.8 (58.6) | 11.0 (51.8) | 18.1 (64.6) |
| Record low °C (°F) | −2.1 (28.2) | −1.7 (28.9) | 0.9 (33.6) | 9.3 (48.7) | 13.7 (56.7) | 15.1 (59.2) | 18.6 (65.5) | 19.5 (67.1) | 13.2 (55.8) | 5.5 (41.9) | 1.8 (35.2) | −1.5 (29.3) | −2.1 (28.2) |
| Average precipitation mm (inches) | 35.4 (1.39) | 33.3 (1.31) | 50.3 (1.98) | 91.1 (3.59) | 159.4 (6.28) | 191.3 (7.53) | 236.0 (9.29) | 227.6 (8.96) | 141.8 (5.58) | 78.9 (3.11) | 41.4 (1.63) | 24.2 (0.95) | 1,318.2 (51.90) |
| Average rainy days | 9.3 | 10.0 | 13.2 | 12.5 | 13.5 | 15.6 | 16.6 | 17.2 | 12.4 | 8.6 | 6.5 | 5.9 | 141.3 |
| Average relative humidity (%) | 80.4 | 82.5 | 83.6 | 82.7 | 81.6 | 83.6 | 84.2 | 85.9 | 84.7 | 82.0 | 80.0 | 78.0 | 82.5 |
| Mean monthly sunshine hours | 74.5 | 59.2 | 59.2 | 98.1 | 171.2 | 161.4 | 180.2 | 171.3 | 174.4 | 157.5 | 136.3 | 115.5 | 1,561.4 |
Source 1: Vietnam Institute for Building Science and Technology
Source 2: The Yearbook of Indochina

=== Population ===
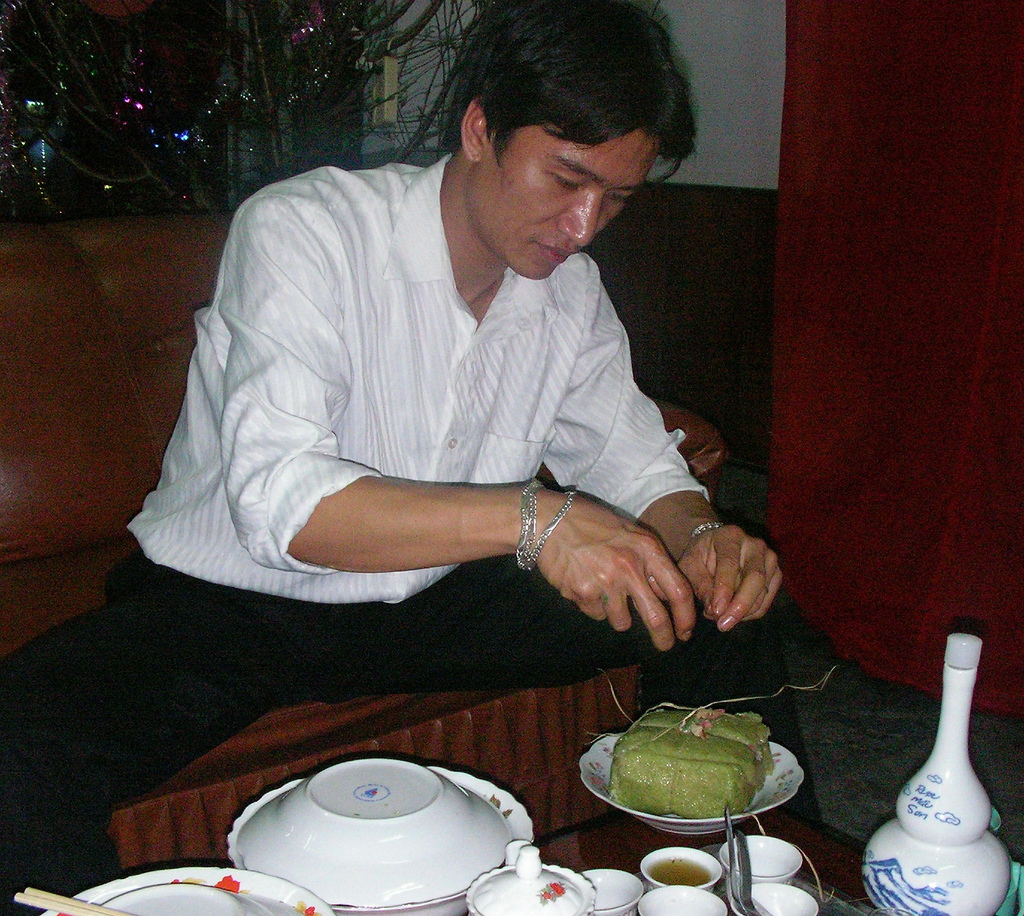
A local restaurant patron in Lạng Sơn

According to the General Statistics Office of the Government of Vietnam, the population of Lạng Sơn Province, as of 2019, was 781,655 with a density of 94 persons per km^{2} over a total land area of 8,310.09 square kilometres (3,208.54 mi^{2}). The female population during this period was 382,245 while the male population was 399,410. The rural population was 621,841 against an urban population of 159,814 (about 26% of the rural population).

There are about 40 ethnic groups in Lạng Sơn recognized by the Vietnamese government. Each ethnicity has their own language, traditions, and subculture. Nùng comprised 42.90% of the population, followed by Tày at 36.08% and Kinh at 16.09%. The remainder are mostly Yao, Tanka, Sán Chay and Hmoob. Nungz dialects include Nùng Phan Slinh in eastern Lạng Sơn, Nùng Cháo around Lạng Sơn city, and Nùng Inh in western Lạng Sơn. (Note: Edmondson, Jerold A., Solnit, David B. (eds). 1997. Comparative Kadai : the Tai branch. Summer Institute of Linguistics and the University of Texas at Arlington Publications in Linguistics 124. Dallas : Summer Institute of Linguistics and the University of Texas at Arlington.)

== History ==
From four chronicles An Nam chí lược, An Nam chí nguyên, An Nam lai uy đồ sách and Đại Việt sử ký toàn thư, its name Lạng Sơn (Chinese: 谅山, Nungz: Phja-lủng (Note: Prof-Dr. Nguyễn Duy Hinh, Địa chí Lạng Sơn : Về chữ Lạng trong địa danh Xứ Lạng (Geography of Lạng Sơn : Discuss about the origin of word Lạng in the name of Lạng Sơn), Lạng Sơn, 1986.)) was originated from Tlủng-san in ancient Annamese language, (Note: Sound recording, which is almost impossible to explain from the word. By Thiều Chửu and Nguyễn Hùng Vỹ.) which means "valleys (lũng) + mountains (sơn)" in modern Vietnamese. (Note: Vân Trai Trần Quang Đức, Ngàn năm áo mũ : Lịch sử trang phục Việt Nam giai đoạn 1009–1945, Nhà sách Nhã Nam & Nhà xuất bản Thế Giới, Hà Nội, 2013.)

From the end of the 19th century, the name of the province has been written in international documents as Langson (English), Lang-Son (French), or sometimes Langland (in general literature and tourist posters). In some cases of Vietnamese spelling before 1977, it was sometimes written as Lạng-sơn (Kinh) or La̭ng-xơn (Mường).

=== Ancient ===
Ancient history is traced to the Bronze Age. This period is marked by the trade route that existed between China and India that passed from the Red River Delta through Nanning to Guangzhou. 7,000–9,000 years ago the limestone caves of the province were inhabited by early settlers of the Bac Son culture.

=== Middle Ages ===
The Đinh emperors (968-980) encouraged the growth of trade in the region and requested the Sung emperors of China that they establish trade relations at Yong Zhou. The Chinese Annals have revealed that the Annamese traded perfumes, elephant ivories, rhinoceros horns, gold, silver and salt in return for Chinese fabrics. Later, under the Lý dynasty a market was established at Vĩnh Bình on the Kỳ Cùng River.

On 4 April 1406, as a Chinese Ming envoy crossed the border into Lạng Sơn, Hồ Quý Ly's forces ambushed them and killed the Trần prince that the Ming were escorting back. Consequently, the Yongle Emperor (of Ming China) launched a punitive expedition against him due to this hostile act. During the reign of the Ming dynasty, during the period 1527 and 1592, Lạng Sơn was fortified in view of its strategic importance at the border; a citadel of this dynasty is located to the west of the Lạng Sơn town on a limestone rock outcrop.

In September 1884, detachments of the Guangxi Army advanced from Lạng Sơn and probed into the Luc Nam valley, announcing their presence by ambushing the French river gunboats Hache and Massue (of the Tonkin Flotilla) on 2 October. General Louis Brière de l'Isle, the French commander-in-chief, responded, transporting nearly 3,000 French soldiers to the Luc Nam valley aboard a flotilla of gunboats and attacking the Chinese detachments before they could concentrate. In the Kép campaign (2 to 15 October 1884), three French columns under the overall command of General François de Négrier fell upon the separated detachments of the Guangxi Army and successively defeated them in engagements at Lam (6 October), Kép (8 October) and Chu (10 October).

In the wake of these French victories, the Chinese fell back to Bắc Lệ and Dong Song, and de Négrier established forward positions at Kép and Chu, which threatened the Guangxi Army's base at Lạng Sơn. Chu was miles southwest of the Guangxi Army's advanced posts at Dong Song, and on 16 December 1884 a Chinese raiding detachment ambushed two companies of the Foreign Legion just to the east of Chu, at Ha Ho. The legionnaires fought their way out of the Chinese encirclement, and underwent a number of casualties and had to abandon their dead on the battlefield. De Négrier immediately brought up reinforcements and pursued the Chinese, and the raiders made good their retreat to Dong Song. (Note: Harmant, 91–112; Lecomte, Lang-Son, 149–55.)

While the Guangxi Army had been forced to retreat in the October battles, its commanders had not given up all hope of breaking into the Delta. Driven partly by sheer hunger and partly by the knowledge that the French would sooner or later move against Lạng Sơn, the Chinese renewed their efforts to gain a foothold in the Luc Nam valley in December. The action at Ha Ho was the first indication that a major move was afoot. A week after this engagement a force of 12,000 Chinese troops from the Guangxi Army occupied the conical hill of Phja Pò, 18 kilometres (11 mi) to the east of Chu, and began to lay out a fortified camp. The Chinese force was under the command of Wang Debang, who had defeated a French column in June 1884 in the Bắc Lệ ambush. (Note: Lung Chang, 332.)

The famished Chinese soldiers plundered all the villages in the area for food, earning the hatred and resentment of the Tonkinese farmers. On 23 December the villagers of Lien Son came to the French headquarters at Chu and alerted Lieutenant-Colonel Donnier to the presence of a Chinese force around Núi Bóp. (Note: Lecomte, Lang-Son, 154.)

The French could not allow a force of 12,000 Chinese to remain at Núi Bop, uncomfortably close to their main base at Chu and threatening the flank of the expeditionary corps when it eventually set off for Lạng Sơn. Brière de l'Isle reinforced the Chu garrison in December, and in January 1885 de Négrier was ordered to take the offensive against the Chinese. (Note: Lecomte, Lang-Son, 155.)

De Négrier's column was drawn from both the 1st and 2nd brigades of the Tonkin Expeditionary Corps. It included a marine infantry battalion under the command of chef de bataillon Mahias, de Mibielle's Turco battalion and two companies of Tonkinese riflemen. The column also included the 111th and 143rd line battalions and Jourdy and de Saxcé's batteries. (Note: Mahias's battalion consisted of the 25th, 29th, 34th and 36th companies, 1st Marine Infantry Regiment (captains Tailland, Salles, Hougnon and Bourguignon). De Mibielle's Turco battalion was the 3rd Battalion, 3rd Algerian Rifle Regiment (captains Camper, Chirouze, Polère and Valet).)

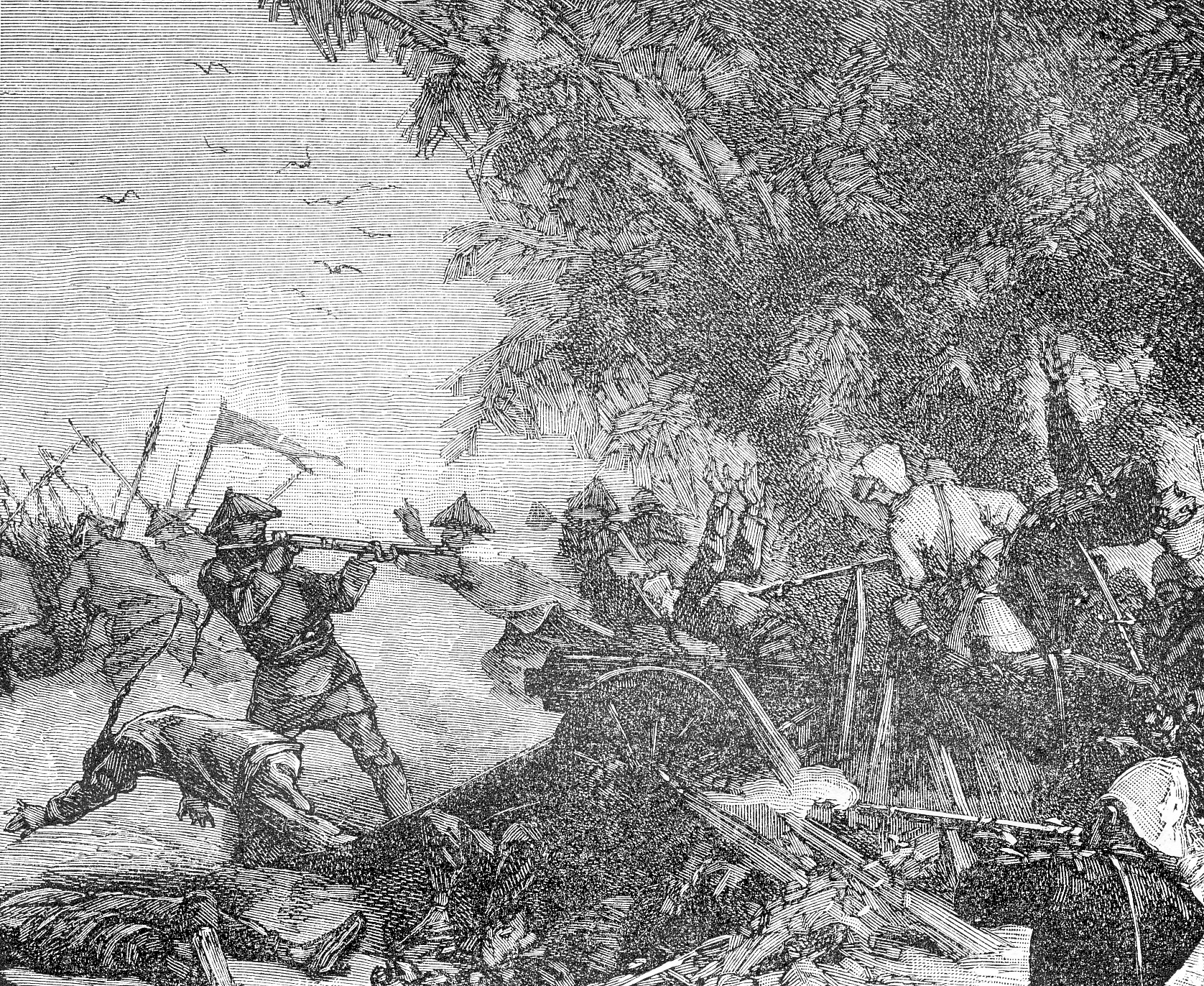
Battle of Phja Pò (or Núi Bóp in Annamese).

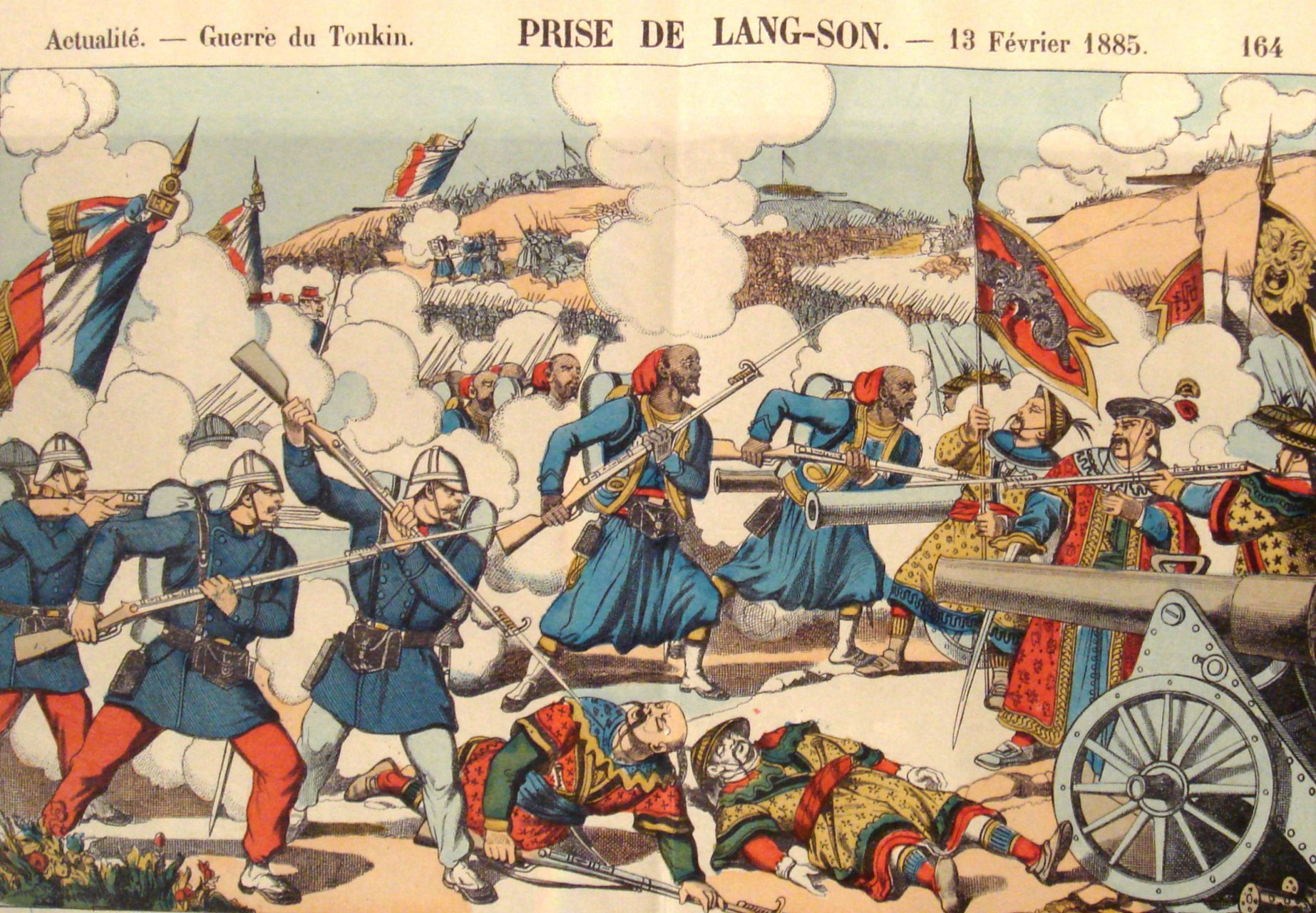
Capture of Lạng Sơn fortrest.

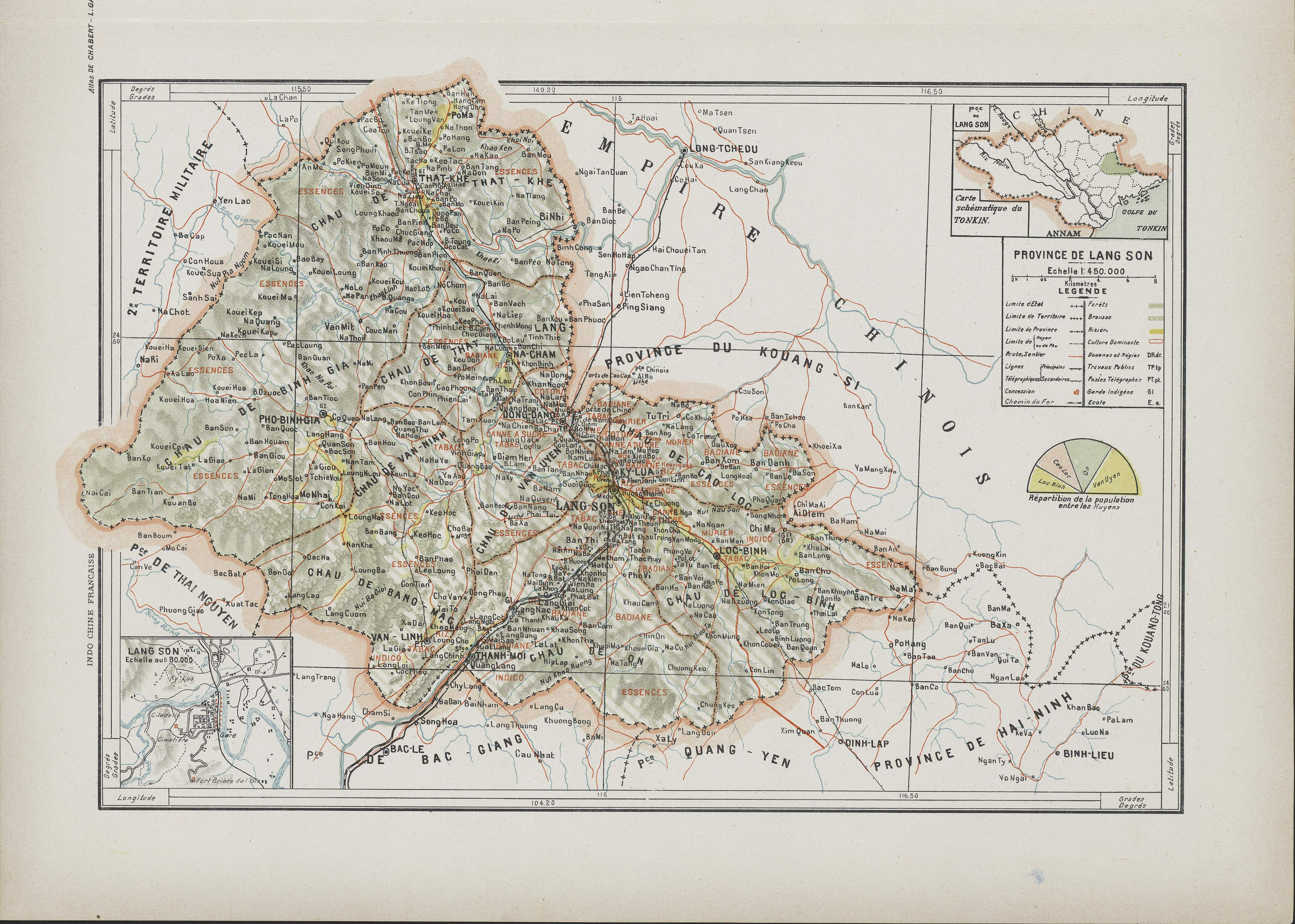
Lạng Sơn province in 1909.

Lạng Sơn town was occupied by the French in 1885.

=== XX century ===
The French converted it into a military base considered as important to their other base in Cao Bằng. In 1906, archaeologist Henri Mansuy discovered the Tham Kanh cave near Pho Binh Gia which he named the Ho Binh Gia. He unearthed unique stone implements and human remains. In 1922–25 M. Coloni explored Lạng Sơn province and identified 43 sites related to the ancient Bac Son culture in the mountains.

Thái-Nguyên Restoration Army in 1917.

Việt-Nam Revolutionary Army in 1930.

Việt-Nam National-Building Army in 1940.

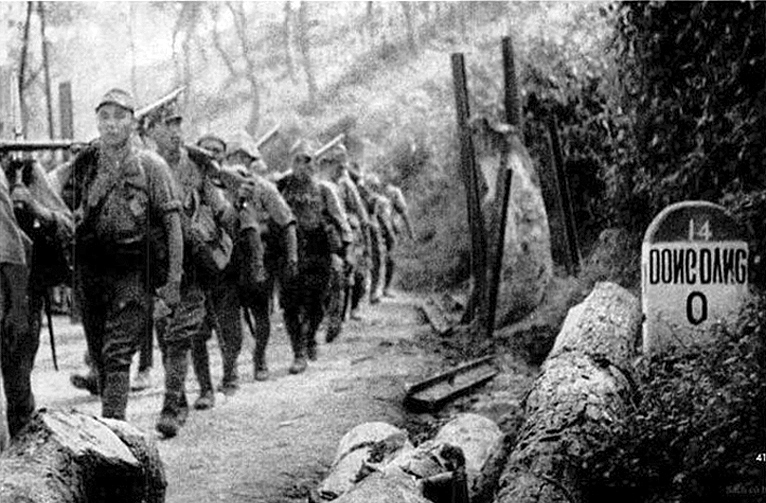
Soldiers of the 5th division, Imperial Japanese Army, are invading French-Indochina at Đồng Đăng in 1940.

During World War II, while the Japanese had signed an agreement with Vichy Indo China, they reneged on the Agreement, without waiting for the ink to dry on the accord, and launched an offensive on Vietnam by withdrawing their troops from China. They crossed the Sino-Vietnamese border and entered 12 kilometres (7.5 mi) inside, near the Lạng Sơn railway station. The Japanese attacked on 22 September 1940 and by the 25th they captured Lạng Sơn. Vichy had lodged a protest with Emperor Hirohito for the breach of the agreement signed between the two countries, which resulted in a ceasefire to the hostilities by the evening of 26 September, and Lạng Sơn was reoccupied by the Vichy forces.

After Ho Chi Minh's communist government was established in September 1945, Japanese had surrendered to the British and Indian Army, under the terms of the Potsdam Conference, to the south of the 16th parallel. As strategy, Ho Chi Minh entered into an agreement with the French so that he could face any threat from the Chinese and a Franco-Vietnamese agreement was signed. This provided for a free Vietnam within the French Union and the Indochinese federation. The French launched an offensive against the Viet Minh in October 1947 with Lạng Sơn as their base. The Viet Minh managed to thwart the French Offensive and forced the French to withdraw to Lạng Sơn. The Viet Minh pursue the French Army, they had a decisive victory on Highway 4 and they had to finally withdraw from Lạng Sơn. This marked the beginning of First Indochina War.

In 1950 the Viet Minh took control of the province and the town. During February 1979, the Chinese invaded Vietnam through the border town of Don Dong (18 kilometres (11 mi) to the north of Long Son town). In this war, which lasted for five days, 600,000 soldiers had descended on Vietnam; Lạng Sơn town was the town that received the thrust of 200,000 soldiers from China and occupied the capital city of the Northern Province. The Vietnamese had the last say as the Vietnamese army was successful in defeating the Chinese army, which bid a retreat. This has achieved the status of a folk lore in the province. The frontier village has remnants of the war on display to the visitors. The border has been rebuilt and brisk trade flourishes between Vietnam and China through this town. During the Chinese invasion in 1959 the Lan Son town was also damaged, it has been rebuilt since then.

On June 7, 1949, the district of Lộc Bình was transferred from Hải Ninh province into Lạng Sơn. During the First Indochina War, Lạng Sơn was a part of Liên khu Việt Bắc. In 1950 the province had 10 districts: Bằng Mạc, Bắc Sơn, Bình Gia, Cao Lộc, Điềm He, Lộc Bình, Ôn Châu, Thoát Lãng, Tràng Định and Văn Uyên. On July 1, 1956, the district of Hữu Lũng of Bắc Giang province was transferred into Lạng Sơn, which was placed in the Khu tự trị Việt Bắc (Region of Northern Vietnam), which was formed the same day. The RNV lasted until December 27, 1975. In 1963 agricultural cooperativization began between the nationalities of the province. On December 16, 1964, the district of Điềm He and six communes of Bằng Mạc were merged to form the new district of Văn Quan; at the same time, the district of Ôn Châu and eight communes of Bằng Mạc district came together to form the new district of Chi Lăng. From December 27, 1975, until December 29, 1978, Lạng Sơn and Cao Bằng provinces were merged to form Cao Lạng Province, before being re-partitioned. At the same time, the district of Đình Lập in Quảng Ninh province was transferred to Lạng Sơn, and since then it has had its later 10 districts.

=== XXI century ===
Before the 2025 administrative divisions merger, Lạng Sơn's capital was also called Lạng Sơn (city), which was a town at the border with China and is 137 kilometres (85 mi) northeast of Hanoi connected by rail and road. Lạng Sơn province was bordered by Cao Bằng province, Bắc Giang province, Bắc Kạn province, Quảng Ninh province, Thái Nguyên province, and China's Guangxi province. The province covers an area of 8,310.18 km^{2} (3,208.58 mi^{2}) and as of 2023 it had a population of 807,300.

Friendship Gate, the historical land link between China and Vietnam, links Lạng Sơn and Guangxi, China.

== Environment ==
=== Forests ===
In the karstic limestone formations (also known as carbonate karst), which occupy 5% of the natural forest area of Vietnam, Long Son and Cai Bang have a place in the floral and faunal wealth of the forests. Northeast Vietnam has 36% of the country's 1.15 million hectares of rocky mountains out of which Lạng Sơn and Cao Bằng provinces account for a part of limestone formations. According to forest statistics of Vietnam these limestone formations have 69 mammal species; five of them are endemic and 26 are rare species. Village people value these formations as they are sources of water for agriculture. They also are sources of fuel wood, medicinal plants and housing materials for the villagers. In Lạng Sơn province they are source of water for irrigation of paddy crops. The limestone formations also permit growth of annona trees which provide revenue to the villagers in Lạng Sơn; the average annual net yield from annona is reported to be about 12 million đồngs (US$775).

=== Star anise ===
A tree grown in Vietnam is the star anise (illicium verum, Hooker), a spice; an evergreen tree which has aromatic lanceolate leaves. The Lạng Sơn province is the leading province with this tree species growth reported to cover 9000 ha, mostly in its Văn Quan District. Initially the tree belonged to the state farm enterprises under collective farming. Since the 1990s, it has decontrolled and given the trees to village families to manage. There are plans to enhance the plantation area under this species of tree to 20,000 hectares (49,000 acres). The commercial production of star anise spice, which was 9,896 tonnes in 1997, has recorded a fall to 5,000 tonnes in 1999.

== Culture ==
=== Historical sites ===
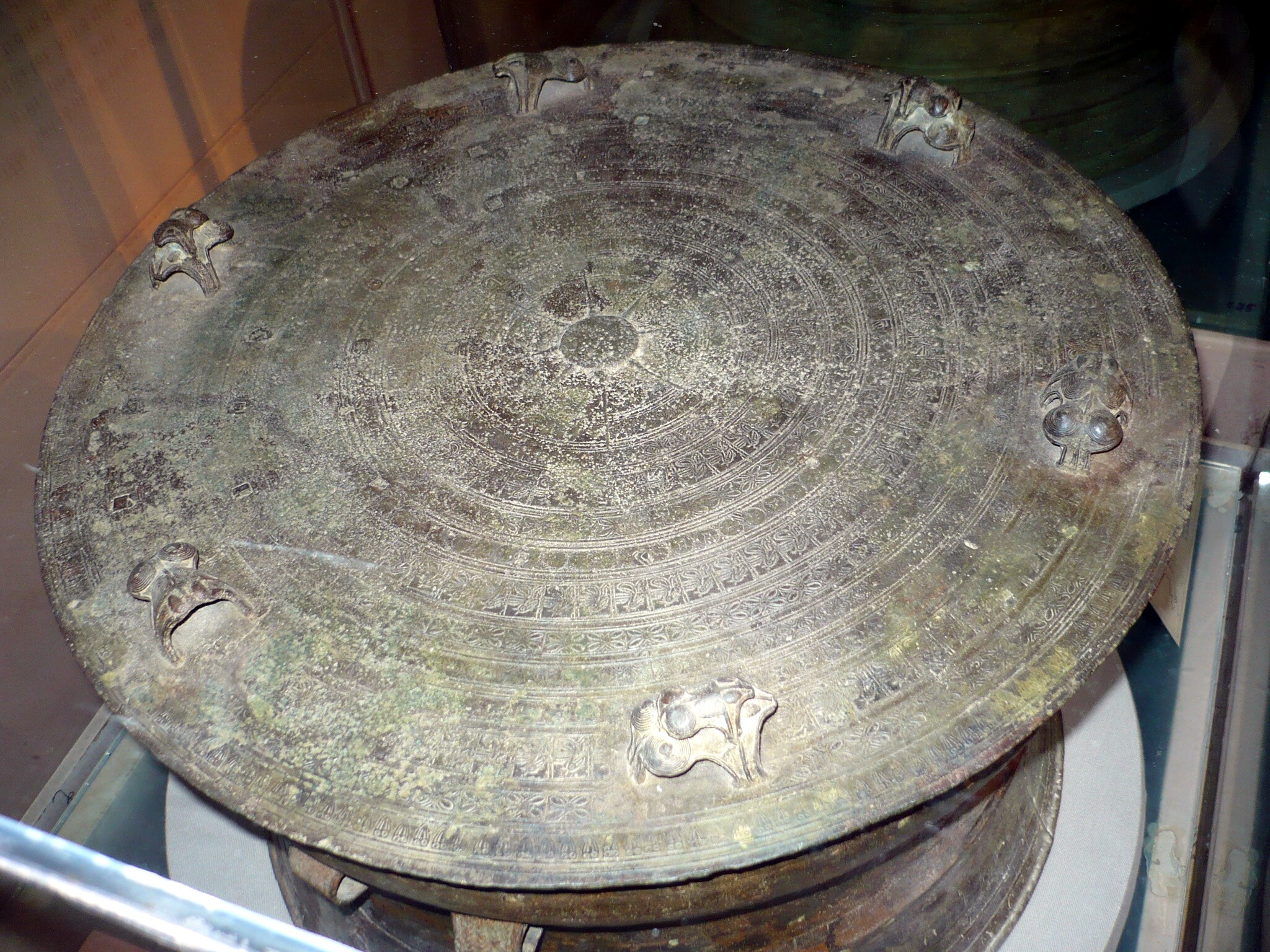
Lạng Sơn Heger II

Apart from the war-ravaged Đồng Đăng Border town, which has a war history that attracts visitors, the other historical places of interest in the province are two limestone caves located near Lạng Sơn town, and a 16th-century citadel of the Ming dynasty.

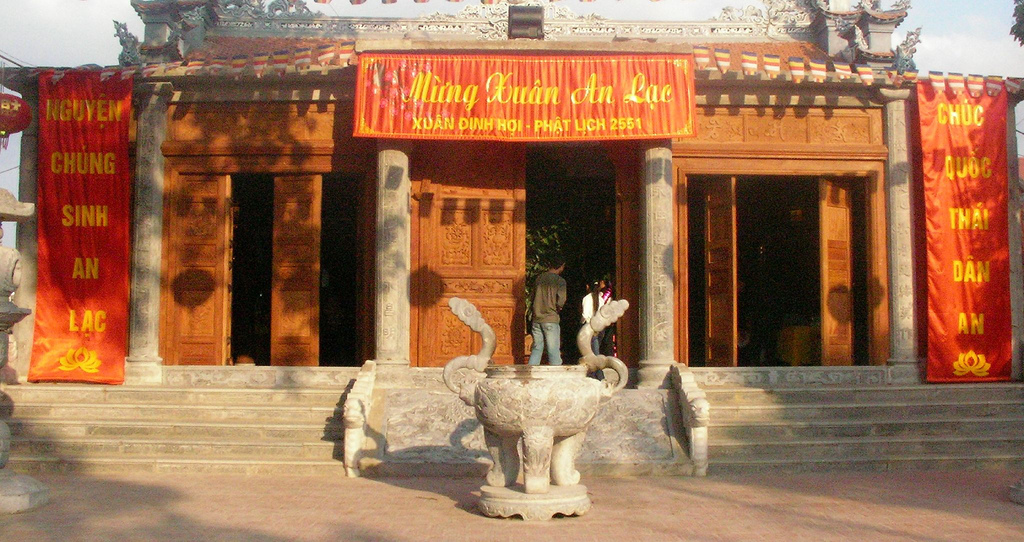
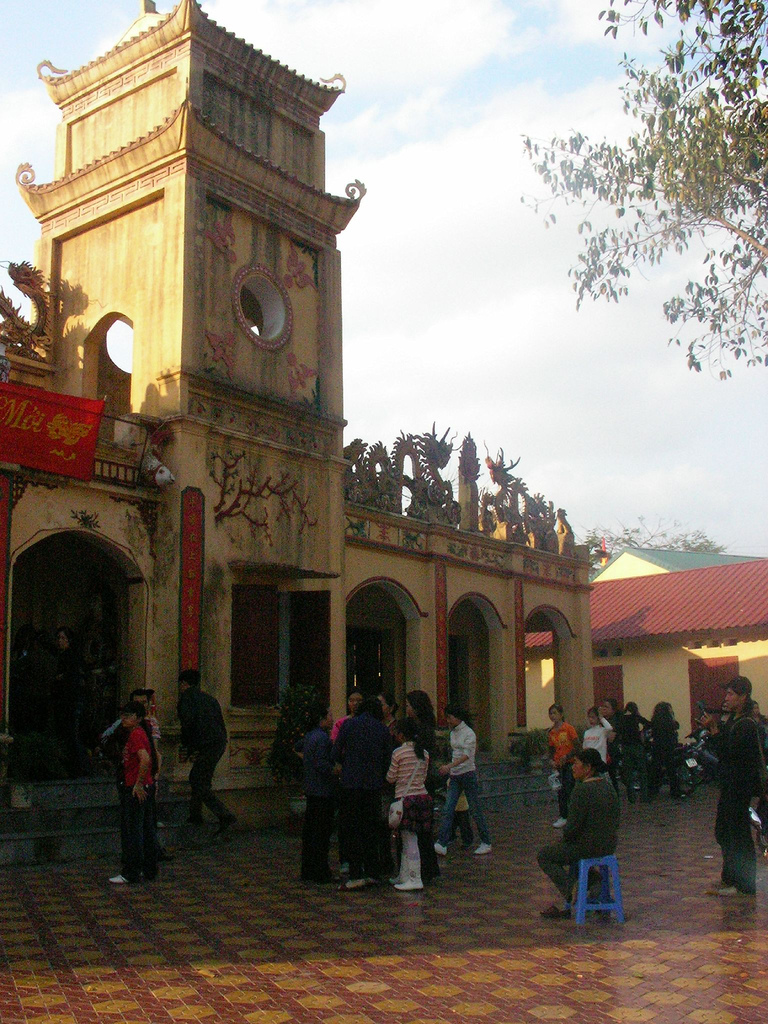
Temple in Lạng Sơn

The two caves contain Buddhist altars, are illuminated and are called the Tam Thanh Cave and the Nhi Thanh Cave. The Tam Thanh Cave has three chambers, a water pond, and has a window opening which provides views of rice fields outside. The outer chamber of the cave on the right contains the Tam Giao Pagoda (built in 1777) with six shrines. The second chamber of the cave on the left also has shrines. The Ngoc Tuyen River flows through this cave into the mountain. The Nhi Thanh Cave, about 700 m away from and Tam Thanh Cave, were discovered in the 18th century by Ngô Thin Sy, a military commander at the Lạng Sơn garrison. His poems have been inscribed at the entrance to the cave. A plaque erected near the cave depicts a French resident of Lạng Sơn in full European dress. The Ngoc Tuyen River flows through the cave.

The Ming dynasty citadel, a 16th-century monument located in a desolate area on a rock outcrop, is bounded by the east–west facing walls and can be accessed using the Tam Tinh road from Lạng Sơn city. A series of steps from the roadside lead to the ruins of the citadel.

=== Tourism ===
Lạng Sơn is known for its mountainous landscapes, limestone caves, and historical sites. Attractions include Mẫu Sơn; Tam Thanh Cave and Nhi Thanh Cave, and Đồng Đăng Temple. Lạng Sơn city also has walls built in the 18th century.

== Economy ==
Lạng Sơn's economy is 80% based on agriculture and forestry. The province has mining reserves of bauxite, phosphate and coal. It also has reserves of gold, silver and lead. Crops include rice, which accounted for 40,000 hectares out of a total of 55,000 hectares grown in 1986, and sweet potato, maize and manioc. It is also known for its commodities of tea and yellow tobacco. These crops are generally grown in the valleys of the Bac Son Mountains, Binh Gia Mountains and the Van Quan Mountains and along the rivers plains of the Kỳ Cùng River and the Thuong River. Some of the districts such as Hữu Lũng District have sugar cane plantations and grow oranges and pineapples, others grow tea and plums. Animal husbandry is developed in Lạng Sơn Province; in 1986, 140,000 buffalo and oxen were recorded in the province and 150,000 pigs. The province is also noted for its That Khe duck speciality.

As against the national figure of 273 agriculture, forestry and fishery cooperatives, 15 are agricultural cooperatives and four are fisheries cooperatives. The number of cooperatives is 32 as against 7,592 cooperatives in the country. There are 26 farms as against the national number of 120699.

The output value of agriculture produce at constant 1994 prices in the province was 1,076.5 billion đồngs against the national value of 156,681.9 billion dongs.
