= China–Vietnam border =

International border

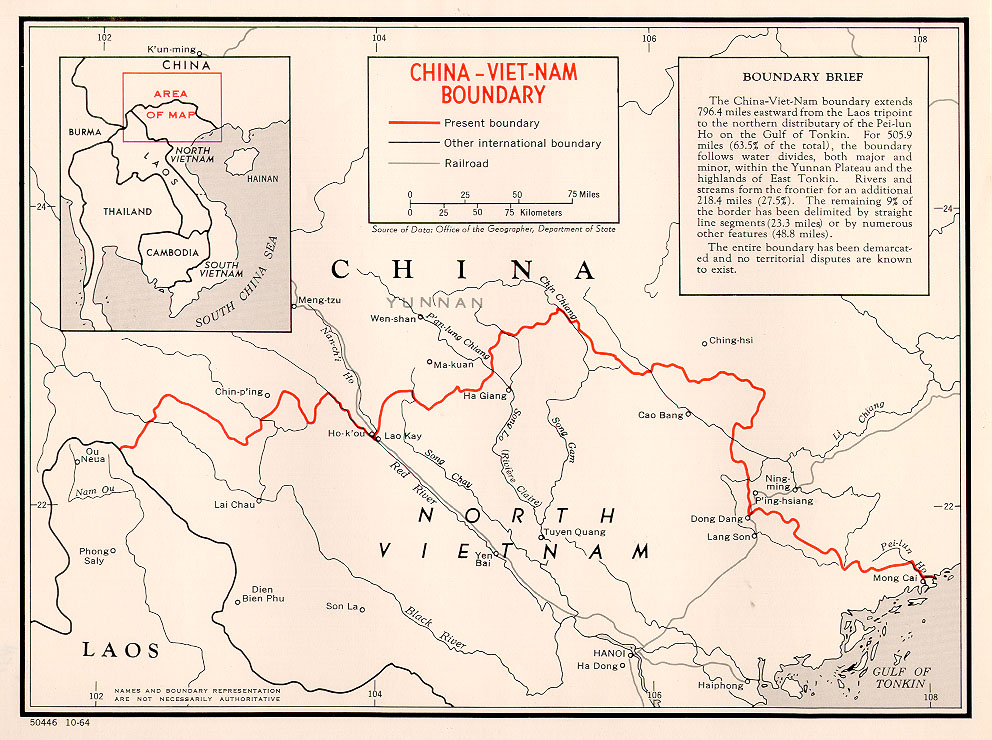
Map of the China-Vietnam boundary

Chinese and Vietnamese boundary markers

The China–Vietnam border is the international boundary between China and Vietnam, consisting of a 1,297 km (806 mi) terrestrial border stretching from the tripoint with Laos in the west to the Gulf of Tonkin coast in the east, and a maritime border in the Gulf of Tonkin and South China Sea.

While disputes over the terrestrial border have been settled with the signing of a land boundary treaty between the two countries, the maritime border is currently undefined due to disputes over the ownership of territorial waters and islands, including the Spratly and Paracel Islands.

== Description ==
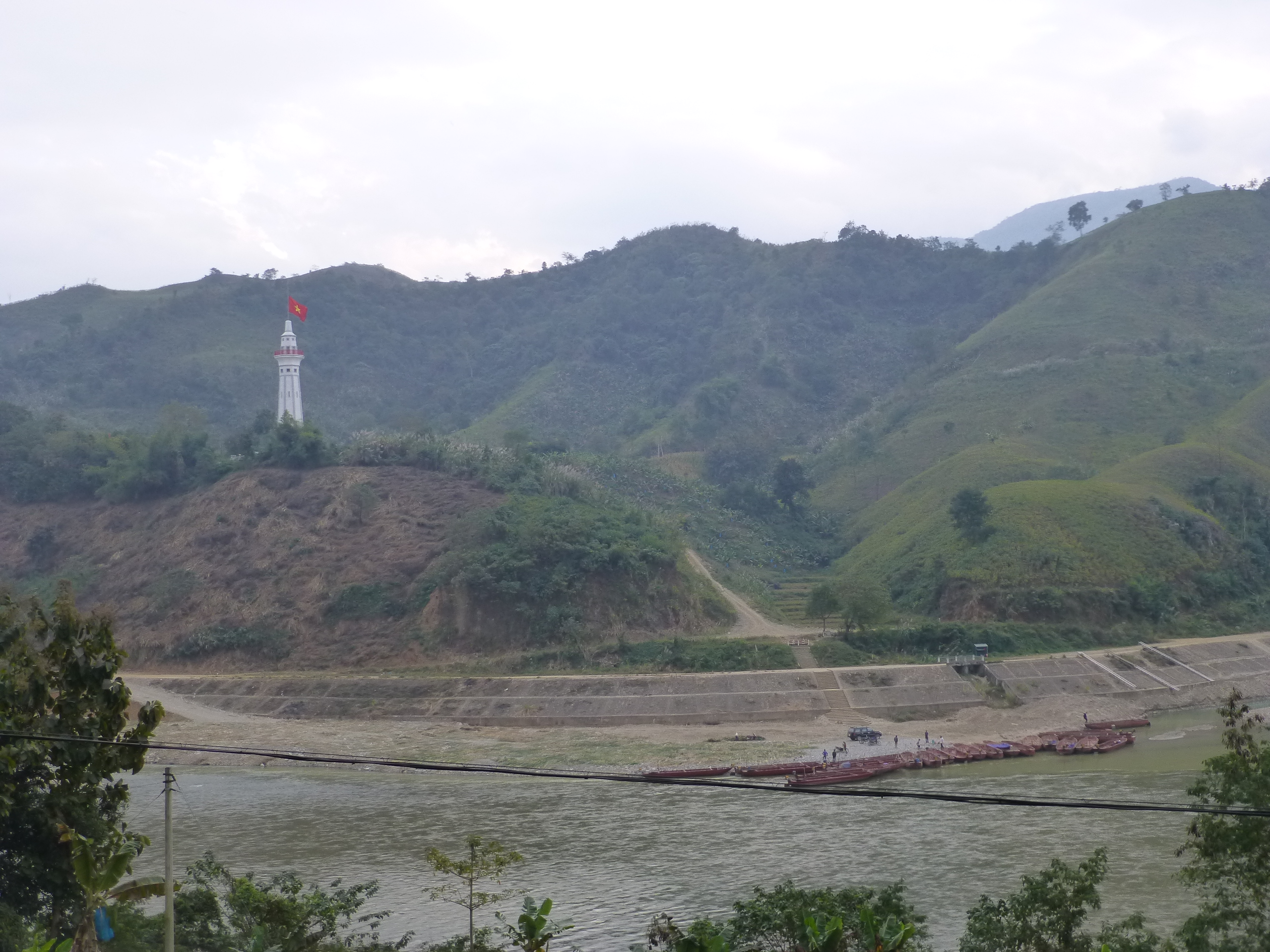
The confluence of the Red River and the Longbao River, where the China-Vietnam border leaves the Red River.

The land border of China and Vietnam is 1,347 kilometers. Two Chinese provinces adjoin the border, and seven Vietnamese provinces do.

The terrestrial border begins in the west at the China-Laos-Vietnam tripoint at the Shiceng Dashan peak. It then proceeds overland in a broadly eastwards direction, albeit in a highly irregular zig-zag pattern, predominantly through isolated mountainous areas inhabited by ethnic minorities. In places, rivers are utilised for short sections, such as the Lixian River, Red River, Nanxi, Sông Gâm, Song Chay, and Jin Jiang. In the east, the border reaches the mouth of the Beilun/Ka Long River near the Chinese city of Dongxing and the Vietnamese city of Móng Cái, following the river through a marshland out to the Gulf of Tonkin.

== History ==
=== Ancient ===
The border region has a long history. China under the Han dynasty had established control over Nam Việt (northern Vietnam) by the early 1st century BC. The Vietnamese of Tonkin managed to break free of Han rule in 939 AD, forming the kingdom of Đại Việt. An initial boundary between the two kingdoms at roughly its present location was established in the aftermath of the Lý–Song War (1075–1077). Thereafter relations were largely peaceful, save for a 20 year occupation of northern Vietnam by Ming China in the 15th century.

=== Colonial period ===
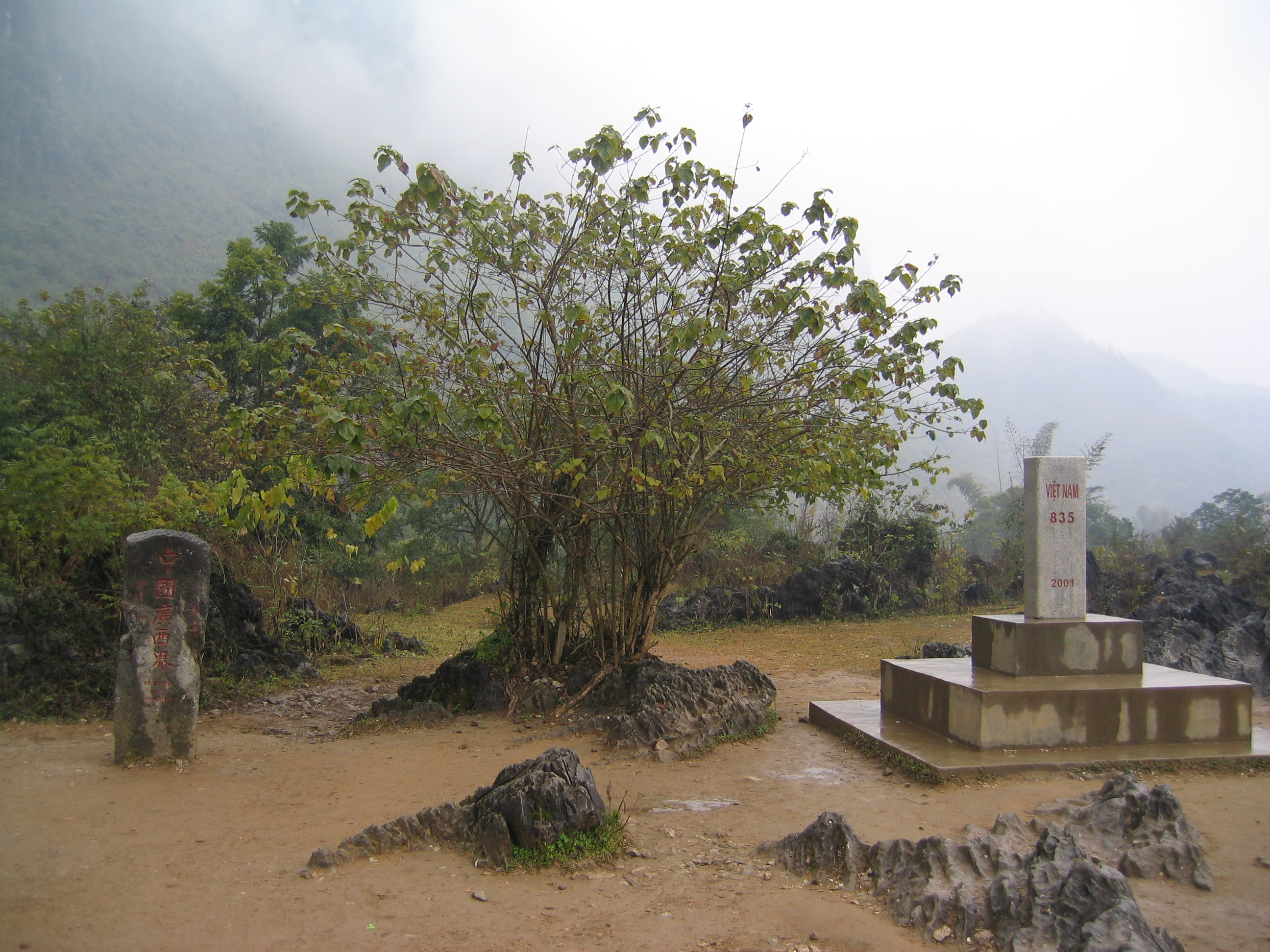
Pillars marking the border near Bản Giốc

In the 19th century France began taking an interest in Vietnam, conquering Cochinchina by 1862. It then expanded its rule over Annam (central Vietnam) and then Tonkin (northern Vietnam) in 1883–84, alarming China and precipitating the Sino-French War. Hostilities were ended via the Treaty of Tientsin (1885), which provided for the demarcation of the border between China and Tonkin. Article 3 of the treaty provided for the appointment of a Sino-French commission to demarcate the border between Tonkin and China, which forms today's China–Vietnam border. China's commissioners were Zhou Derun (Chinese: 周德潤; Wade–Giles: Chou Te-jun), and Deng Chengxiu (Chinese: 鄧承修; Wade–Giles: Teng Ch'eng-hsiu). The French commission was led by M. Bourcier Saint-Chaffray, and its members included M. Scherzer, the French consul in Guangzhou, Dr. Paul Neis, a noted Indochina explorer, Lieutenant-Colonel Tisseyre, Captain Bouinais, and M. Pallu de la Barrière (though the latter took no part in the commission's work). In preparation for the commission's work General de Courcy despatched French troops to occupy Lạng Sơn, That Khe and other border towns in October 1885.

Demarcation work began in late 1885 and was completed in 1887, the latter the same year that Tonkin was incorporated into the colony of French Indochina. The French rejected Chinese claims to the Vietnamese town of Đồng Đăng, close to the Guangxi border and the site of a French victory during the Sino-French War, but agreed that the Pak-lung peninsula (白龍尾) on the western border of Guangdong province should be awarded to China. A dispute over two areas on the border between Yunnan province and Tonkin was settled by the award of Mường So (Chinese: 猛梭; pinyin: Měngsuō; Wade–Giles: Meng-suo) and Menglai (Chinese: 猛賴; Wade–Giles: Meng-lai) to Vietnam and the transfer of a large tract of fertile arable land between Mabaiguan (馬白關; Ma-pai-kuan) and Nandanshan (南丹山; Nan-tan-shan) to China. A Convention confirming the new border between Vietnam and China was signed in Beijing on 26 June 1887 by French and Chinese representatives. A later convention, signed on 20 June 1895, delimited some disputed areas of the frontier. Subsequently 285–341 border markers (Note: Differing figures for the precise number of markers are given in different sources.) were erected along the boundary. The border demarcation between the French and the Qing Dynasty was described as being carried out under "incomplete technical and practical conditions and incomplete and unclear and inaccurate texts and maps of many border sections." The border markers were erected not based on a coordinate grid and many suffered damage, were lost through time or removed. Many of the original maps also no longer existed and migration of populations took place that was not in accordance with the de jure borderline. All these factors posed difficulties to border management.

=== Modern era ===
French Indochina was invaded by Japan via China during the Second World War, though a compromise was arranged whereby a Vichy French administration continued to run the colony whilst Japanese troops were allowed to be stationed there. This modus vivendi broke down in the final year of the war – a short-lived Vietnamese puppet-state was established by the Japanese, which later collapsed, prompting the nationalist Việt Minh movement under Hồ Chí Minh to declare independence. A long war then broke out as France attempted to reassert control, ending in their defeat and the independence of Vietnam; however the country was split in two, with North Vietnam like China now under Communist rule. In 1957 and 1958 China and North Vietnam confirmed that they both respected the border established via the Tientsin Protocol.

During the Vietnam War China backed North Vietnam with arms and aid, assisting the North in its eventual victory. However, after the war ended in 1975 relations deteriorated over several contentious issues, such as Vietnam's siding with the USSR in the Sino-Soviet split, China's rapprochement with the USA under President Richard Nixon, disputes over the maritime border, and China's alleged support for minority insurgent groups along the border.

Border disputes between the two countries were significant in the 1970s. One hundred sixty-four locations on the land border totaling 227 square kilometers were disputed. Because there was not yet clear border demarcation, the countries engaged in a pattern of retaliatory land grabs and violence. The number of border skirmishes increased yearly from 125 in 1974 to 2,175 in 1978.

The two countries attempted a first round of negotiations to resolve land border issues, but were not successful. A second round of negotiations in August 1978 was also unsuccessful because of the Youyi Pass Incident in which the Vietnamese army and police expelled 2,500 refugees across the border into China. Vietnamese authorities beat and stabbed refugees during the incident, including 9 Chinese civilian border workers. Following this event, Vietnam occupied the Pu Nian Ling area, which China also claimed.

The final straw came after Vietnam invaded Cambodia and removed the Chinese-backed Khmer Rouge government of Democratic Kampuchea in 1978. The following year the brief Sino-Vietnamese War broke out along the border; though China withdrew after only three weeks it remained in occupation of small strategic areas along the frontier, and low-level skirmishes along the border continued throughout the 1980s.

In 1990, Vietnam withdrew from Cambodia, ending one of the major points of contention between China and Vietnam, and relations were normalised in November 1991. In October 1992 the two countries began work on resolving outstanding territorial issues. Both sides accepted the validity of the 1887 and 1895 lines, and a final boundary treaty was then signed on 30 December 1999. The treaty was ratified the following year, and full demarcation then began, which was completed in 2008. Out of a disputed territory of 227 km^{2} (87.6 mi^{2}), China acquired 114 km^{2} (44 mi^{2}) and Vietnam acquired 113 km^{2} (43.6 mi^{2}). In 2000 an agreement on the maritime boundary in the Gulf of Tonkin was agreed, however disputes persist over islands in the South China Sea. Neither of the agreements signed by the two parties are recognized by the Republic of China on Taiwan and continues to claim the territory, as reflected in its official maps.

In 2022, China constructed barriers along its 1,297-kilometer southern land border with Vietnam, including a 12-foot-high fence designed to restrict cross-border movement.

== Border crossings and trade points ==
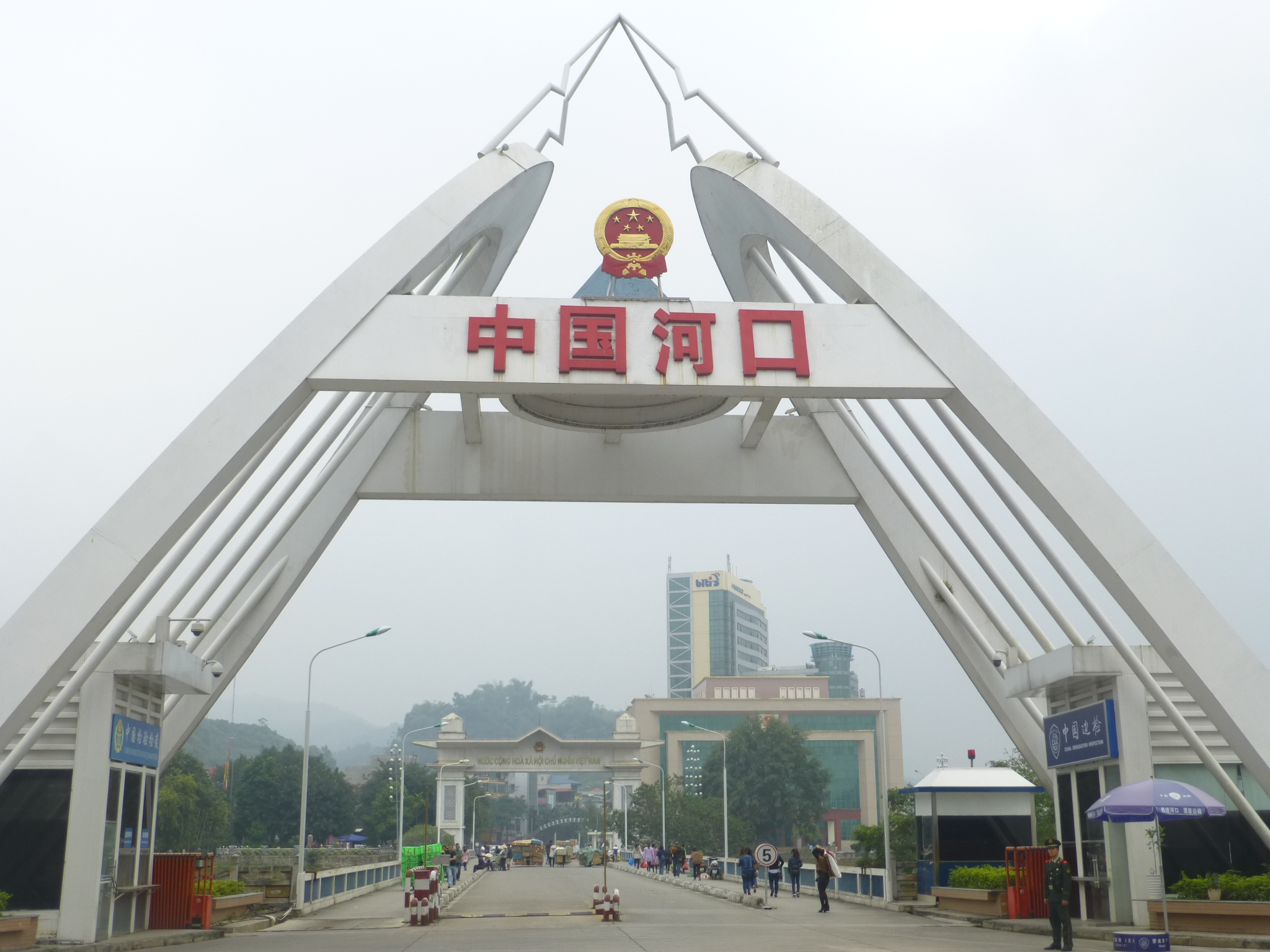
The border crossing between Hekou (foreground) and Lao Cai (background)

China and Vietnam signed an agreement on border trade in 1991. In 1992, 21 border trade points (cross border markets and goods import/export but limited through access for people) were opened, of which four also served as border crossings. Vietnamese living in the border region may enter China using a one-day border pass that reduces wait at Chinese customs.

List of border crossings and trade points

The major border crossings are highlighted in bold; from west to east they are:

- Longfu (Pu'er, Yunnan, China) – A Pa Chải (Mường Nhé, Điện Biên, Vietnam) (**trade point**)
- Yakoushuitang (Lüchun, Honghe Hani and Yi Autonomous Prefecture, Yunnan, China) – U Ma Tu Khoòng (Mường Tè, Lai Châu, Vietnam)
- Jinshuihe (Jinping, Yunnan, China) – Ma Lù Thàng (Phong Thổ, Lai Châu, Vietnam)
- Beishan (Hekou, Yunnan, China) – Kim Thành (Lào Cai, Lào Cai, Vietnam)
- Hekou (Yunnan, China) – Lào Cai (Lào Cai, Vietnam)
- Qiaotou (Maguan, Wenshan Zhuang and Miao Autonomous Prefecture, Yunnan, China) – Mường Khuơng (Si Ma Cai, Lào Cai, Vietnam) (**trade point**)
- Dulong (Maguan, Wenshan Zhuang and Miao Autonomous Prefecture, Yunnan, China) – Xín Mần (Xín Mần, Hà Giang, Vietnam)
- Tianbao (Malipo, Wenshan Zhuang and Miao Autonomous Prefecture, Yunnan, China) – Thanh Thủy (Vị Xuyên, Hà Giang, Vietnam)
- Tianpeng (Funing, Wenshan Zhuang and Miao Autonomous Prefecture, Yunnan, China) – Săm Pun (Mèo Vạc, Hà Giang, Vietnam)
- Pingmeng (Baise, Guangxi, China) – Sóc Giang (Hà Quảng, Cao Bằng, Vietnam)
- Longbang (Baise, Guangxi, China) – Trà Lĩnh (Trùng Khánh, Cao Bằng, Vietnam)
- Yuexu (Guangxi, China) – Pò Peo (Trùng Khánh, Cao Bằng, Vietnam)
- Shuolong (Daxin, Chongzuo, Guangxi, China) – Lý Vạn (Hạ Lang, Cao Bằng, Vietnam)
- Shuikou (Longzhou, Chongzuo, Guangxi, China) – Tà Lùng (Quảng Hòa, Cao Bằng, Vietnam)
- Jianggang (Longzhou, Chongzuo, Guangxi, China) – Nà Nưa (Tràng Định, Lạng Sơn, Vietnam)
- Ping'er Guan (Pingxiang, Chongzuo, Guangxi, China) – Bình Nghi (Tràng Định, Lạng Sơn, Vietnam)
- Yingyang (Pingxiang, Chongzuo, Guangxi, China) – Na Hình (Văn Lãng, Lạng Sơn, Vietnam)
- Puzhai (Pingxiang, Chongzuo, Guangxi, China) – Tân Thanh (Văn Lãng, Lạng Sơn, Vietnam) (**trade point**)
- Youyi Guan (Pingxiang, Chongzuo, Guangxi, China) – Hữu Nghị (Đồng Đăng, Cao Lộc, Lạng Sơn, Vietnam) (Also called the "Friendship Pass") (**trade point**)
- Beishan (Ningming, Guangxi, China) – Co Sâu (Cao Lộc, Lạng Sơn, Vietnam) (**trade point**)
- Aidian (Ningming, Guangxi, China) – Chi Ma (Lộc Bình, Lạng Sơn, Vietnam)
- Banbang (Ningming, Guangxi, China) – Bản Chắt (Đình Lập, Lạng Sơn, Vietnam) (**trade point**)
- Dongzhong (Fangchenggang, Guangxi, China) – Hoành Mô (Bình Liêu, Quảng Ninh, Vietnam)
- Lihuo (Fangchenggang, Guangxi, China) – Bắc Phong Sinh (Hải Hà, Quảng Ninh, Vietnam)
- Tansan (Fangchenggang, Guangxi, China) – Pò Hèn (Móng Cái, Quảng Ninh, Vietnam)
- Dongxing (Dongxing, Fangchenggang, Guangxi, China) – Móng Cái (Móng Cái, Quảng Ninh, Vietnam) (**trade point**)

There are two rail crossings:

- Hekou – Lào Cai – Where the narrow-gauge Hanoi–Lào Cai railway crosses the Nanxi River over a bridge and meets China's Kunming–Hekou railway.
- Đồng Đăng – Pingxiang – Where standard-gauge trains can cross the border on the Nanning-Hanoi line.

== Historical maps ==
Historical maps of the border from west to east in the

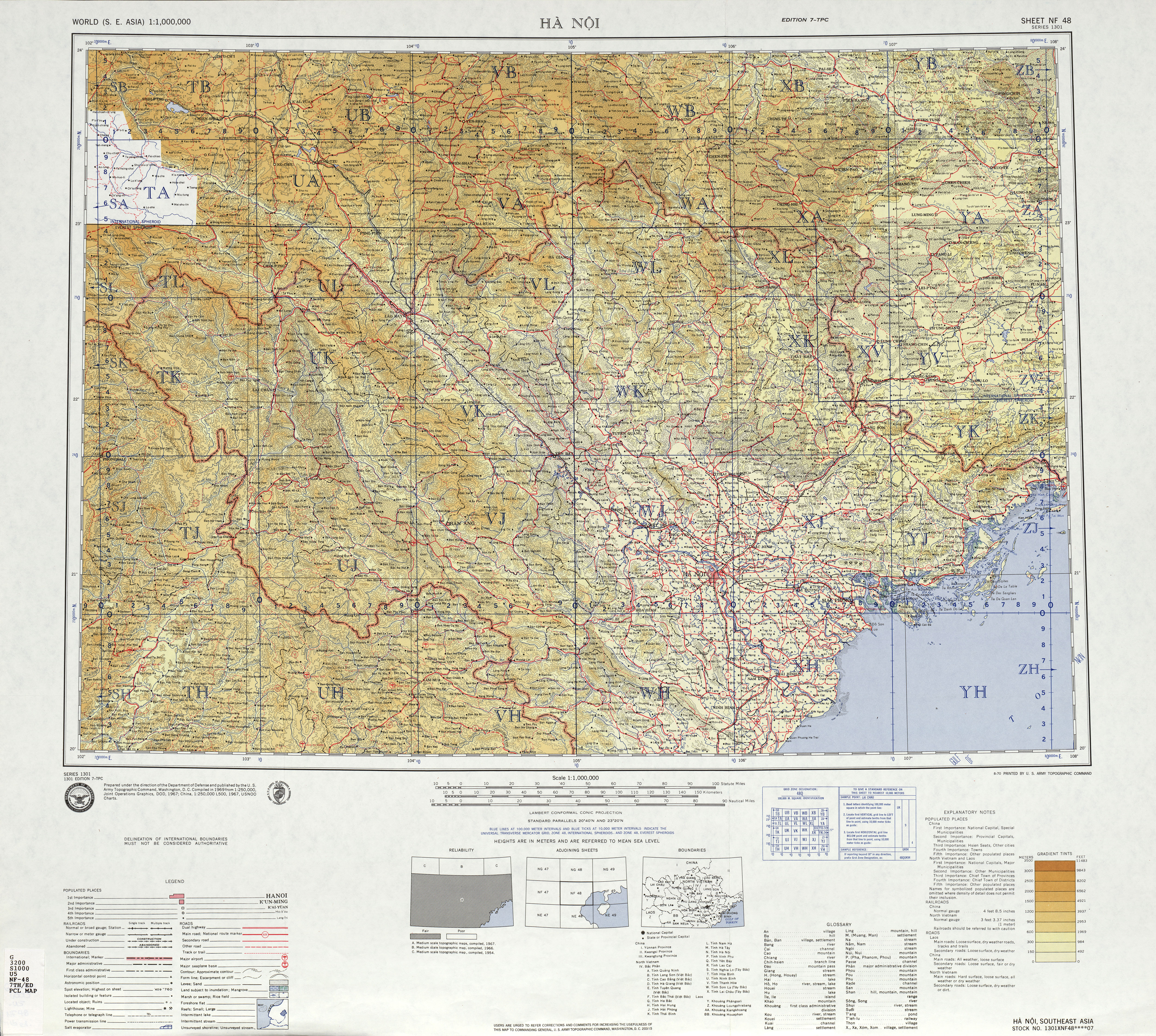
From the International Map of the World and Operational Navigation Chart, late 20th century - West

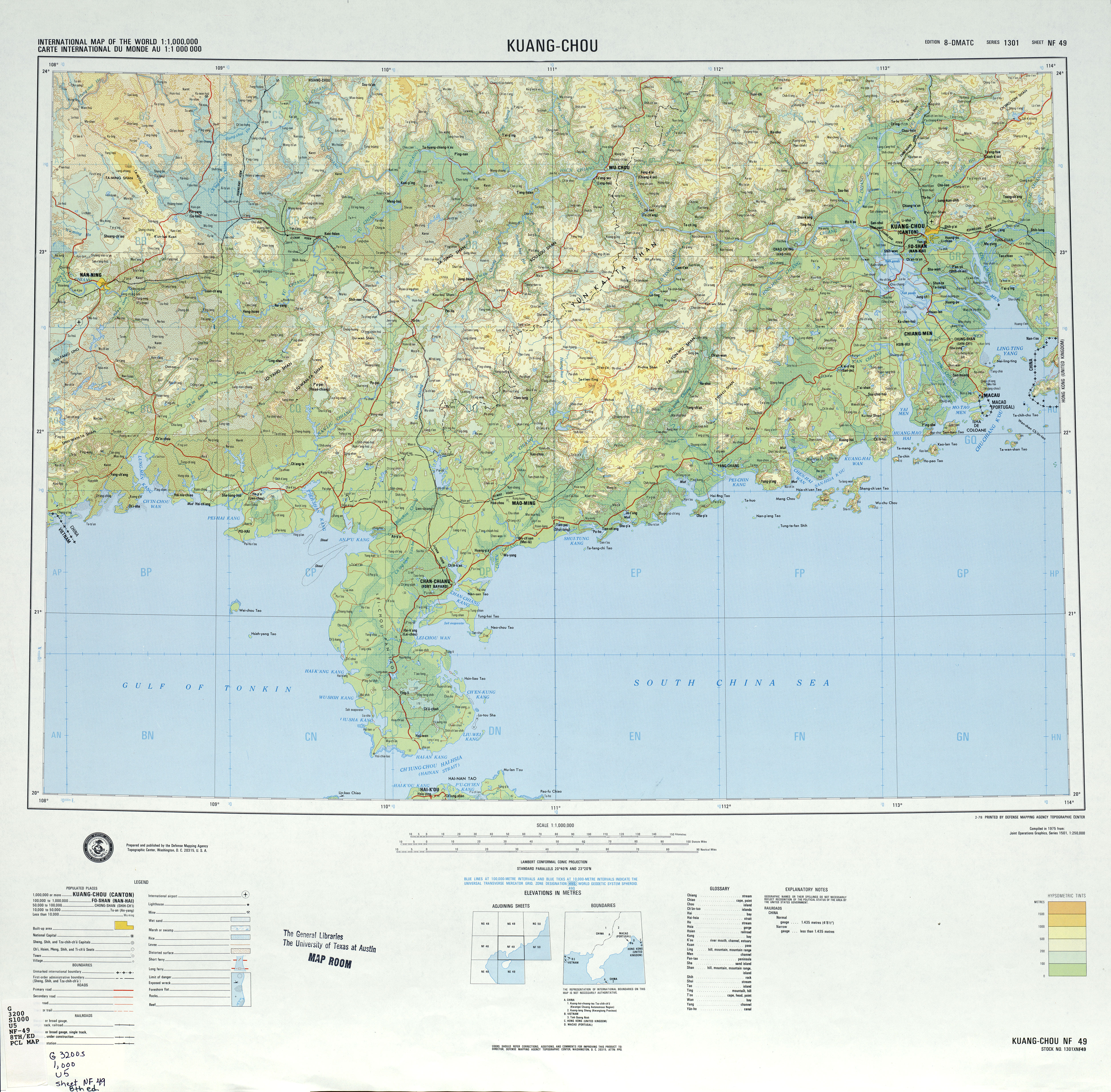
Central

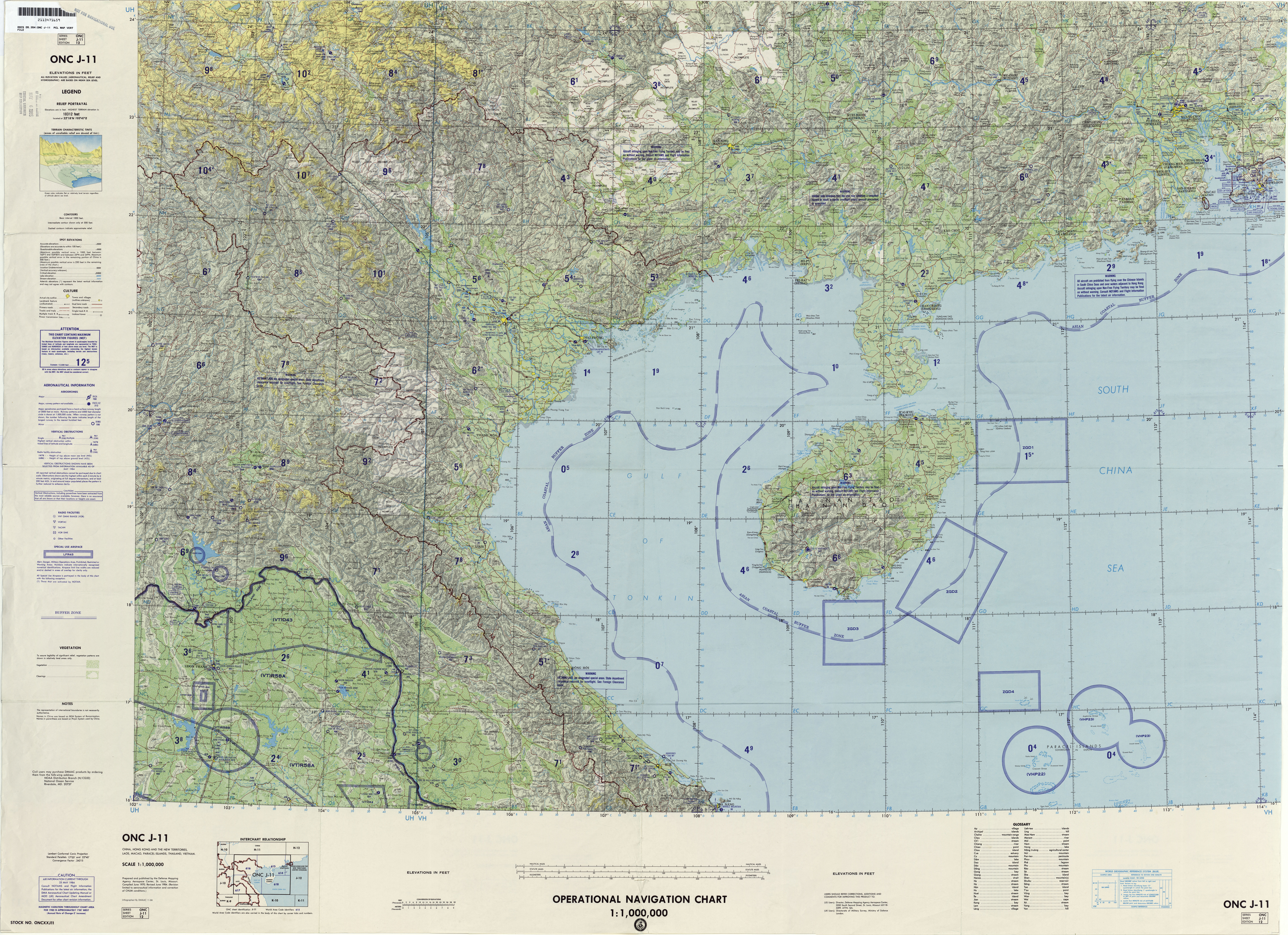
East

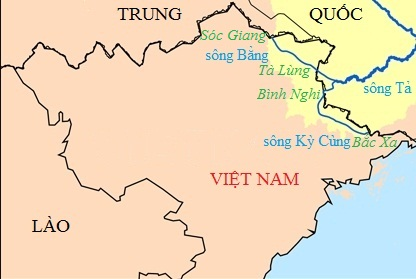
China–Vietnam border rivers

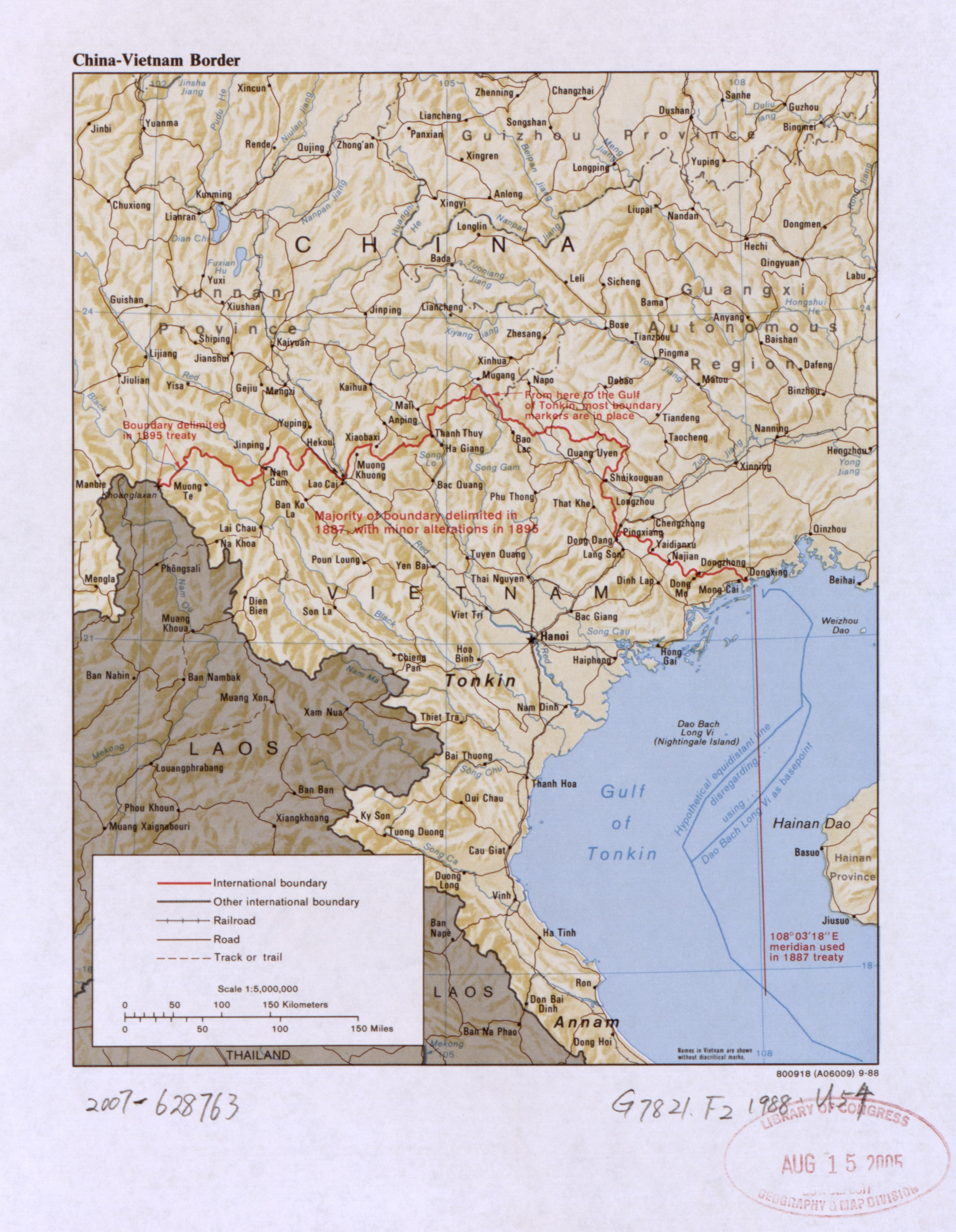
China–Vietnam border

== See also ==
- Ports of entry of China
- Cambodia–Vietnam border
- Little Vietnam
- French Indochina
- Franco-Vietnamese relations
- Socialist Republic of Vietnam
- Les Vietnamiens à Paris
- China–Vietnam relations
- United States–Vietnam relations
