= Battle of Đồng Đăng =

Battle of Đồng Đăng or Battle of Dong Dang may refer to:

- Battle of Đồng Đăng (1885), occurring during the Sino-French War in 1885.
- Battle of Đồng Đăng (1979), occurring during the Sino-Vietnamese War in 1979.
