= Đồng Đăng =

Đồng Đăng Commune Xã Đồng Đăng Pháo đài Đồng Đăng
- Commune (Class-II)
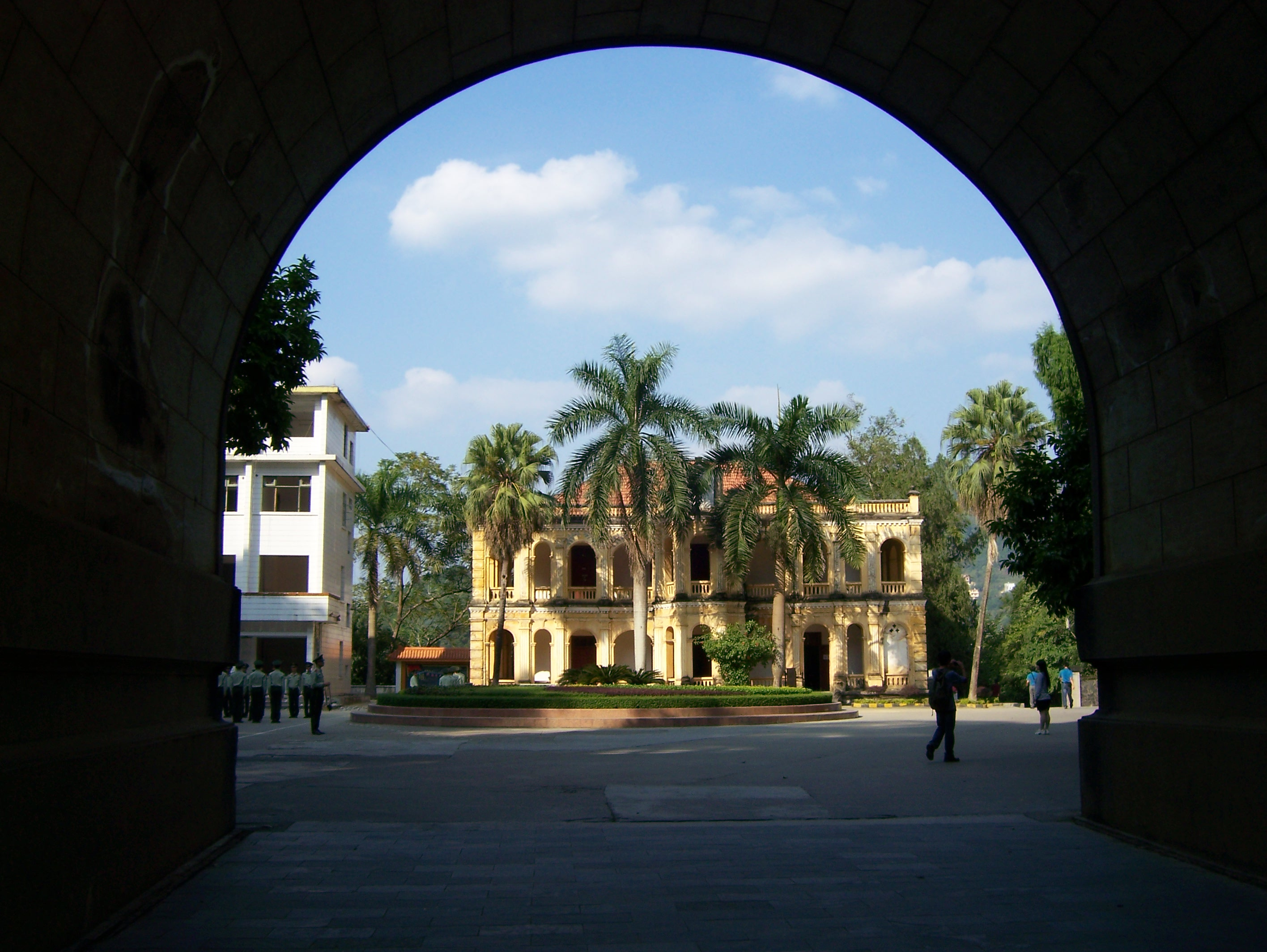
- A corner of Đồng Đăng.
- Nickname: "The Border Fortress" (Tiền đồn biên viễn)
- Location within Vietnam
- Country: Vietnam
- Region: Northern Midlands and Mountains
- Province: Lạng Sơn
- Establishment: 7th century
- Central hall: No.10, Nam Quan little zone, Đồng Đăng commune

Government
  - Type: Commune-level authority
  - People Committee's Chairman: Nguyễn Ngọc Thiều
  - People Council's Chairman: Lê Trí Thức
  - Front Committee's Chairman: Nông Văn Cường
  - Party Committee's Secretary: Lê Trí Thức

Area
  - Commune (Class-II): 91.57 km^{2} (35.36 sq mi)

Population (2025)
  - Commune (Class-II): 24,976
  - Density: 272.8/km^{2} (706.4/sq mi)
  - Urban: 8,922
  - Metro: 16,054
  - Ethnicities: Kinh; Tanka; Nùng; Tày; Tráng
- Time zone: UTC+7 (Indochina Time)
- ZIP code: 240000—25164 (Note: An official code from 2022 to present.)
- Website: Dongdang.Langson.gov.vn; Dongdang.Langson.dcs.vn

Đồng Đăng (Vietnamese pronunciation: [ɗoŋ˨˩ ɗɐŋ˧]) is a commune of Lạng Sơn province in the Northern Midlands and Mountains region of Vietnam.

== History ==
=== Middle Ages ===
The area of Đồng Đăng ( 同登) was inherently deserted. It had only the Tam Thanh temple, Kỳ Lừa market and a small fort to defend the frontier, which was built in the Later Lê Dynasty around the 16th century.

Đồng Đăng was once an unexpected land until the Battle of Đồng Đăng occurred, which caused shock of both Guangxi and Tonkin in 1885.

=== 20th century ===
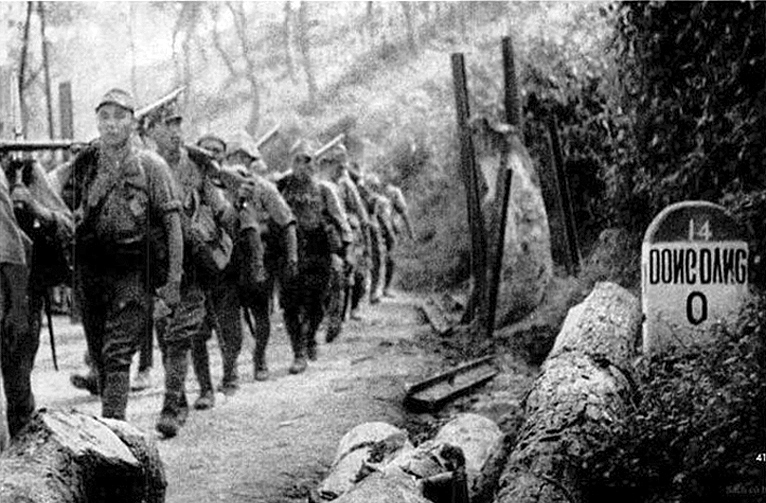
The 5th division of the Imperial Japanese Army were marching to Tonkin from Đồng Đăng in 1940.

In September 1940 a group of Japanese officers, in spite of an agreement signed the 22nd, attacked Đồng Đăng and laid siege to Lam Sơn, beginning the Japanese invasion of French Indochina. In March 1945 the Japanese again attacked, and it was the site of the fiercest fighting of the March coup d'état, when a company of Tonkinese Rifles and a battery of colonial artillery held off the invaders for three days before being massacred.

In 1979, the border township became ground for heavy engagements between Chinese and Vietnamese forces during the Sino-Vietnamese War.

=== 21st century ===
At 08:13 AM on February 26, 2019, Đồng Đăng Station was honored to be the first place of Vietnam to welcome North Korean leader Kim Jong Un to prepare for the summit with US President Donald Trump in Hanoi.

On April 21, 2025, after the dissolution of Cao Lộc Rural District by the Government of Vietnam, according to the Plan for arrangement of the commune-level administrative units in 2025 (Note: Đề án sắp xếp đơn vị hành chính cấp xã năm 2025 của UBND tỉnh Lạng Sơn.) by the Lạng Sơn Provincial People's Committee, Đồng Đăng Township was officially merged with four communes, Hồng Phong, Phú Xá, Thụy Hùng, and Bảo Lâm, to become a new administrative unit from midnight on May 1: Đồng Đăng commune (xã Đồng Đăng).

== Geography ==
=== Topography ===
Đồng Đăng is best known as a border commune on the Vietnamese side of the main road and rail crossing to China. It is on National Route 1.

Đồng Đăng station and the commune capital are several kilometres short of the Friendship Pass border crossing. (Note: Vietnam 10 - Page 158 Nick Ray, Yu-Mei Balasingamchow, Iain Stewart - 2009 "border crossing : youyi guan–Huu nghi quan - The Friendship Pass at Dong Dang–Pingxiang is the most popular border crossing in the far North. The border post itself is at Huu Nghi Quan (Friendship Gate), 3km North of Dong Dang township; a xe-ôm".) (Note: China's Southwest 3rd Edition - Page 485 Damian Harper - 2007 "As train tickets to China are expensive in Hanoi, some travellers buy a ticket to Dong Dang, walk across the border and then buy a train ticket on the Chinese side. This isn't the best way, because it's several kilometres from Dong Dang to Friendship Pass, and you'll have to hire someone to take you by motorbike. If you're going by train, it's best to buy a ticket from Hanoi to Pingxiang".) It is one of three main border crossings with China, the others being Móng Cái–Dongxing, Guangxi to the East on the coast, and Laokay–Hekou, Yunnan, inland 150 km Northwest. (Note: Rough Guide to China - Page 20 David Leffman, Simon Lewis, Jeremy Atiyah - 2003 "Vietnam has three border crossings with China - Dong Dang, 60km Northeast of Hanoi; Lao Cai, 150km Northwest; and the little-used Mong Cai, 200km south of Nanning. All three are open daily between 8.30am and 5pm. Vietnamese border...".) A fourth crossing is the Trà Lĩnh District–Longbang, Guangxi crossing.

=== Landscapes ===
From the Middle Ages

- Kỳ Lừa market (Kỳ Lừa thị)
- Nhị Thanh temple (Nhị Thanh quán)
- Tam Thanh temple (Tam Thanh quán)
- Tô Thị stone (Tô Thị thạch)

From the 20th century

- Friendship Pass (Hữu Nghị quan)
- Đồng Đăng Fort (Đồn Đồng Đăng)
- Hanoi–Đồng Đăng Railway (Hà Nội–Đồng Đăng thiết lộ)
- Tien Yen–Lang Son–Cao Bang Expressway (Tiên Yên–Lạng Sơn–Cao Bằng cao tốc lộ)

== Culture ==
Since the Manuels de lecture en quốc-văn was published for the first time, folk poems about the landscapes in Đồng Đăng commune have been popular among generations of Vietnamese people.

Excerpt from the poem "Đồng Đăng có phố Kỳ Lừa":

Đồng Đăng có phố Kỳ Lừa,
Có nàng Tô Thị, có chùa Tam Thanh.

Translation:

Đồng Đăng has market Kỳ Lừa,
Also lady Tô Thị and temple Tam Thanh.

== See also ==
Dong Dang travel guide from Wikivoyage

- Bắc Sơn war zone
- Chi Lăng pass
- Mother mountain
