= Liping =

Liping may refer to:

- Liping County (黎平县), a county in Guizhou, China
- Liping, Gansu (黎坪镇), a town in Wen County, Gansu, China
- Liping Township, Hunan (栗坪乡), a township in Mayang Miao Autonomous County, Hunan, China

== See also ==
- Li Ping (disambiguation)
