= China National Highway 212 =

Road in China

National Highway 212
- 212国道

Route information
- Length: 2,300 km (1,400 mi)

Major junctions
- From: Lanzhou in Gansu
- To: Chongqing

Location
- Country: China

Highway system
- National Trunk Highway System; Primary; Auxiliary
← G211	→ G213

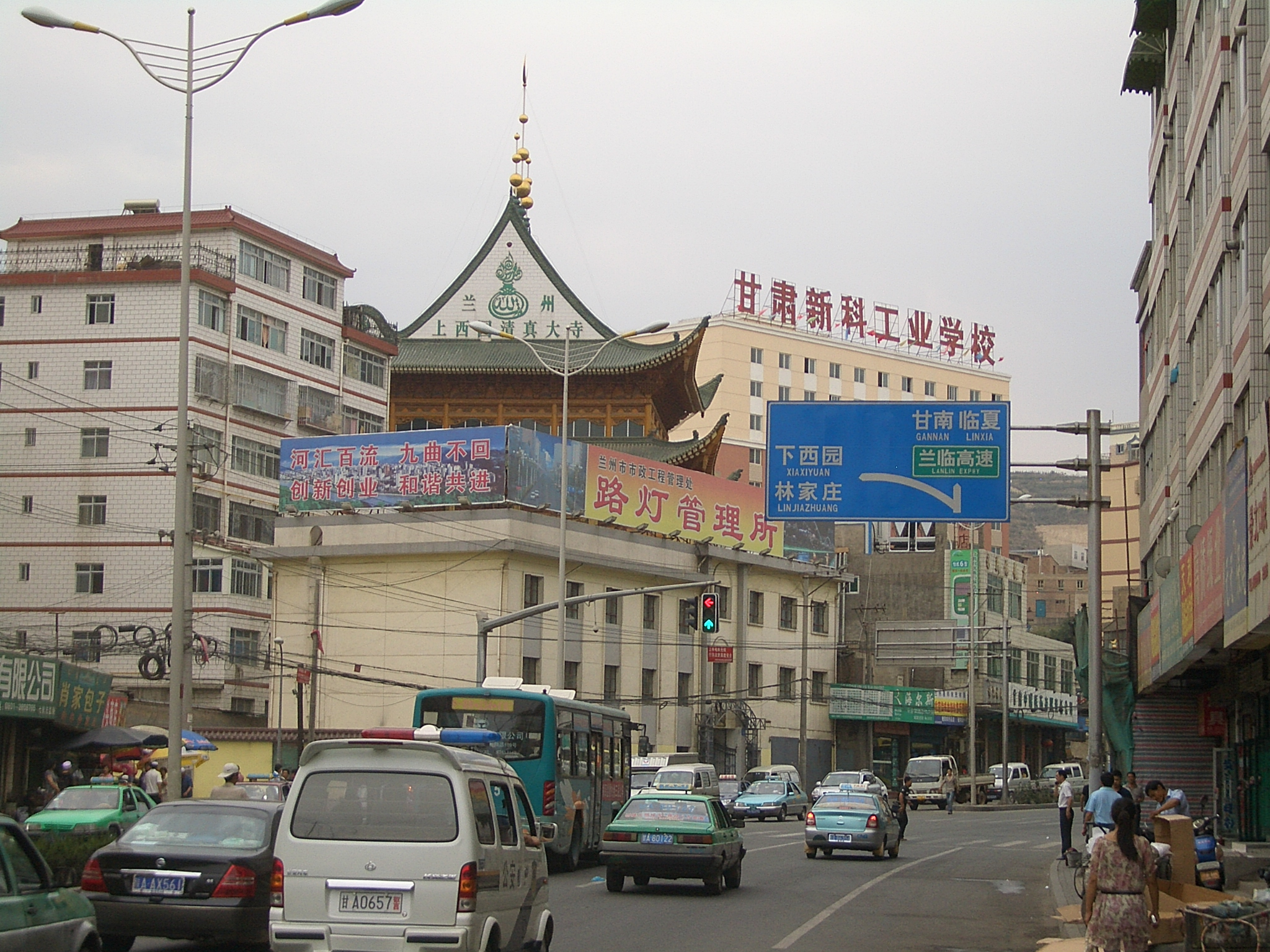
Near the start of G212 in Lanzhou

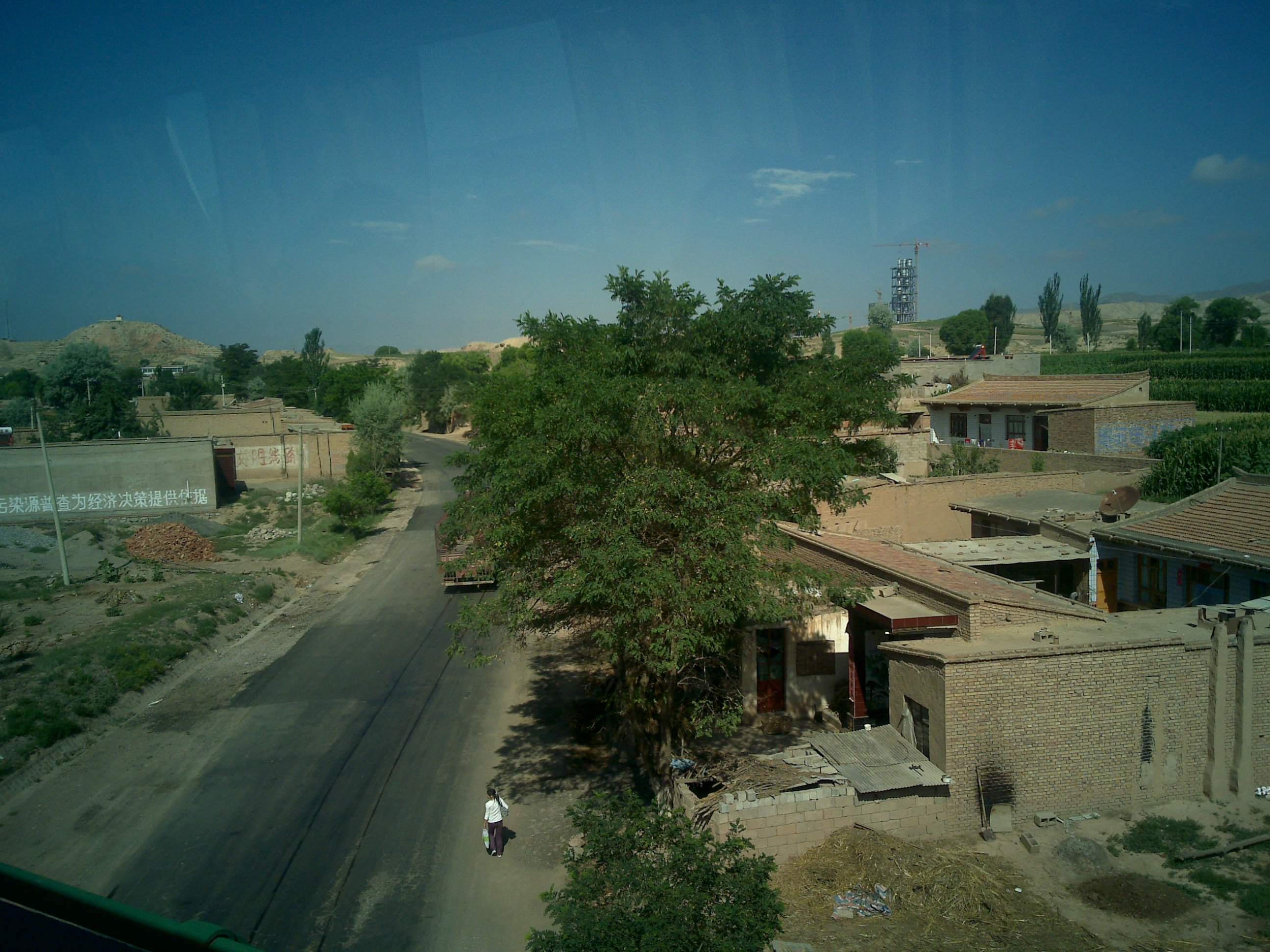
Near Zhongpu Town, Lintao County

China National Highway 212 (G212) runs from Lanzhou in Gansu to Chongqing. It was originally 1302 kilometres in length. In the 2013 National Highway Network Planning it was extended to Longbang, Guangxi, on the border with Vietnam. After the extension, the length is circa 2,300 km (1,400 mi).

Between Lanzhou and the junction at Huichuan Town (35 or so km south of Lintao), G212 is concurrent with China National Highway 316.

It is the only national highway passing through Wen County, Gansu.

As a result of the 2008 Sichuan earthquake and again during the 2020 China floods, the road was severely damaged and had to be repaired by rescue teams.

== Route and distance ==
Route and distance

City	Distance (km)
Lanzhou, Gansu	0
Lintao, Gansu	104
Minxian, Gansu	271
Tanchang, Gansu	346
Wudu, Gansu	455
Wenxian, Gansu	601
Guangyuan, Sichuan	809
Yuanba, Sichuan	833
Cangxi, Sichuan	937
Langzhong, Sichuan	963
Nanbu, Sichuan	998
Xichong, Sichuan	1062
Nanchong, Sichuan	1100
Guang'an, Sichuan	1176
Hechuan, Chongqing	1215
Beibei, Chongqing	1254
Shapingba, Chongqing	1290
Chongqing, Chongqing	1302
Longbang, Guangxi	2300

== See also ==
- China National Highways
