= Quercus trungkhanhensis =

Conservation status
- Critically Endangered (IUCN 3.1)

Scientific classification
- Kingdom: Plantae
- Clade: Embryophytes
- Clade: Tracheophytes
- Clade: Spermatophytes
- Clade: Angiosperms
- Clade: Eudicots
- Clade: Rosids
- Order: Fagales
- Family: Fagaceae
- Genus: Quercus
- Subgenus: Quercus subg. Cerris
- Section: Quercus sect. Ilex
- Species: Q. trungkhanhensis

Binomial name
- Quercus trungkhanhensis H.T.Binh & Ngoc

Species of flowering plant

Quercus trungkhanhensis is a species of oak. It is a tree endemic to northeastern Vietnam, where it known only from Trung Khanh District of Cao Bang Province. The species is known from only two individuals growing in subtropical evergreen mixed forest on limestone soils at 760 metres elevation.

The species was described by Hoang Thi Binh and Nguyen Van Ngoc in 2018.
