= Wen County, Gansu =

Wen County 文县
- County
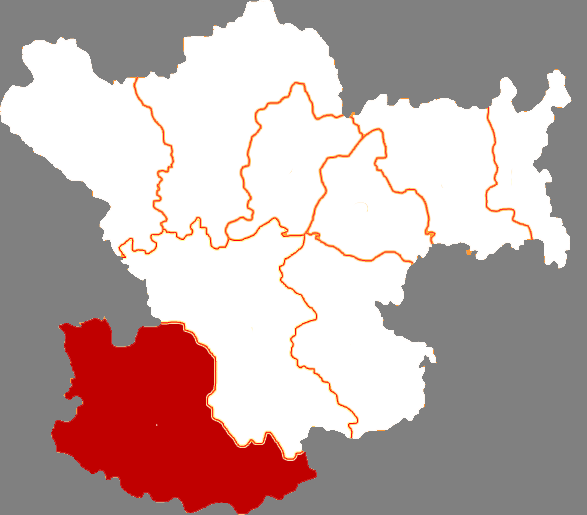
- Wen in Longnan

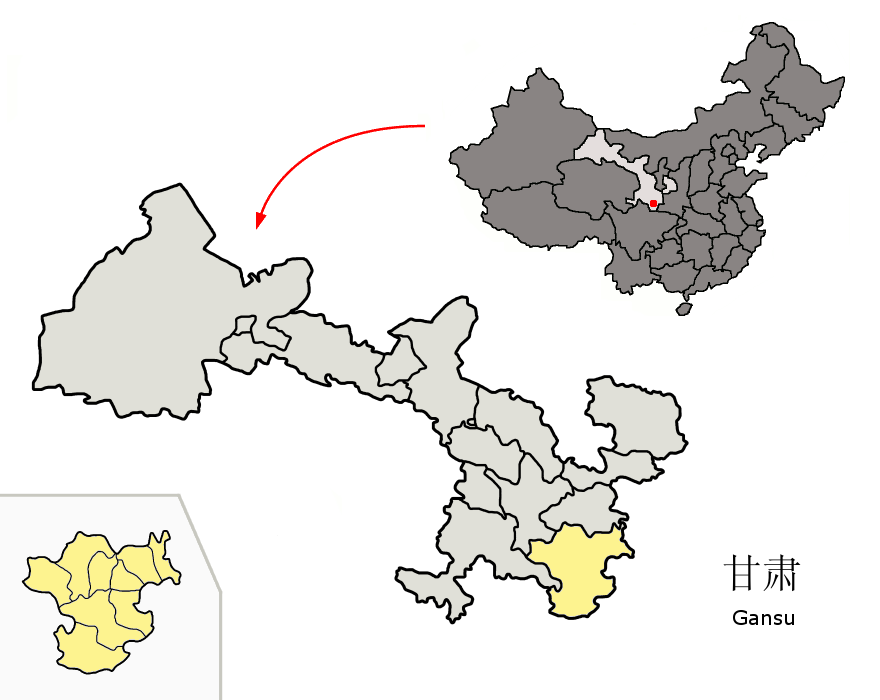
- Longnan in Gansu
- Coordinates: 32°56′38″N 104°41′01″E
- Country: China
- Province: Gansu
- Prefecture-level city: Longnan
- County seat: Chengguan

Area
  - Total: 4,994 km^{2} (1,928 sq mi)
- Highest elevation: 4,187 m (13,737 ft)
- Lowest elevation: 550 m (1,800 ft)

Population (2019)
  - Total: 241,000
  - Density: 48.3/km^{2} (125/sq mi)
- Time zone: UTC+8 (China Standard)
- Postal code: 746400
- Website: www.lnwx.gov.cn/cluster/wxIndex

Wen County or Wenxian (Chinese: 文县; pinyin: Wén Xiàn) is a county under the administration of the prefecture-level city of Longnan, in the southeast of Gansu province, China, bordering Sichuan province to the south and west. It has a land area of 4,994 square kilometers, and a population of 241,000 (2019), notably having the largest population of Baima people.

Gecko Gekko wenxianensis is named after Wen County, its type locality.

== Administrative divisions ==
Wen County is divided to 14 towns, 5 townships and 1 ethnic township.

Towns

- Chengguan (城关镇): county seat
- Bikou (碧口镇)
- Shangde (尚德镇)
- Zhongzhai (中寨镇)
- Linjiang (临江镇)
- Qiaotou (桥头镇)
- Liping (黎坪镇)
- Tianchi (天池镇))
- Baoziba (堡子坝镇)
- Shifang (石坊镇)
- Shijiba (石鸡坝镇)
- Danbao (丹堡镇)
- Zhongmiao (中庙镇)
- Fanba (范坝镇)

Townships

- Liujiaping Township (刘家坪乡)
- Yulei Township (玉垒乡)
- Koutouba Township (口头坝乡)
- Jianshan Township (尖山乡)
- Sheshu Township (舍书乡)

Ethnic township

- Tielou Tibetan Ethnic Township (铁楼藏族乡)

=== Former divisions ===
Former Townships that were merged into others in 2004:

- Hengdan Township (横丹乡)
- Shangdan Township (上丹乡)
- Dianba Township (店坝乡)
- Xiaojia Township (肖家乡)
- Dunzhai Township (屯寨乡)
- Maying Township (马营乡)

== History ==
Wen County has been inhabited since the Neolithic era, as evidenced by Majiayao culture sites. The area was later inhabited by the Di people. Throughout the centuries, the area was ruled by many different dynasties and kingdoms.

As a result of the 2008 Sichuan earthquake, 93% of households in Wen County had their homes damaged or collapsed. The main road to access the county, China National Highway 212, was also blocked in both directions.

== Economy ==
Tea, Codonopsis pilosula, Sichuan pepper, walnuts and olive oil are the main agricultural produce of the region.

Two reservoirs (Bikou Reservoir and Miaojiaba Reservoir) have been constructed in the Bailong River. The reservoirs serve to provide hydroelectricity, aquaculture, flood control, irrigation and for tourism development. The county holds one fifth of total exploitable hydropower resources of Gansu. Wenxian is also rich in metal deposits, most notably the Yangshan gold mine is Asia's largest Carlin–type gold deposit.

== Geography ==
Major rivers in Wen County are the Bailong River, Baishui River, Baima River and Rangshui River.

== Climate ==
Climate data for Wenxian, elevation 1,014 m (3,327 ft), (1991–2020 normals, extremes 1981–present)
| Month | Jan | Feb | Mar | Apr | May | Jun | Jul | Aug | Sep | Oct | Nov | Dec | Year |
|---|---|---|---|---|---|---|---|---|---|---|---|---|---|
| Record high °C (°F) | 16.8 (62.2) | 23.8 (74.8) | 30.3 (86.5) | 35.2 (95.4) | 36.1 (97.0) | 37.5 (99.5) | 39.9 (103.8) | 38.5 (101.3) | 35.8 (96.4) | 29.2 (84.6) | 24.2 (75.6) | 17.9 (64.2) | 39.9 (103.8) |
| Mean daily maximum °C (°F) | 8.9 (48.0) | 11.9 (53.4) | 17.1 (62.8) | 22.9 (73.2) | 26.6 (79.9) | 29.4 (84.9) | 31.2 (88.2) | 30.4 (86.7) | 25.2 (77.4) | 19.9 (67.8) | 15.4 (59.7) | 10.1 (50.2) | 20.8 (69.4) |
| Daily mean °C (°F) | 4.4 (39.9) | 7.2 (45.0) | 11.7 (53.1) | 16.8 (62.2) | 20.3 (68.5) | 23.4 (74.1) | 25.4 (77.7) | 24.8 (76.6) | 20.5 (68.9) | 15.6 (60.1) | 10.7 (51.3) | 5.5 (41.9) | 15.5 (59.9) |
| Mean daily minimum °C (°F) | 0.6 (33.1) | 3.5 (38.3) | 7.5 (45.5) | 11.9 (53.4) | 15.5 (59.9) | 18.8 (65.8) | 21.1 (70.0) | 20.6 (69.1) | 17.1 (62.8) | 12.4 (54.3) | 7.2 (45.0) | 1.7 (35.1) | 11.5 (52.7) |
| Record low °C (°F) | −6.2 (20.8) | −4.8 (23.4) | −3.2 (26.2) | 1.9 (35.4) | 6.1 (43.0) | 10.5 (50.9) | 15.4 (59.7) | 11.8 (53.2) | 9.3 (48.7) | −0.2 (31.6) | −3.3 (26.1) | −5.9 (21.4) | −6.2 (20.8) |
| Average precipitation mm (inches) | 1.1 (0.04) | 2.8 (0.11) | 13.9 (0.55) | 38.5 (1.52) | 62.6 (2.46) | 62.2 (2.45) | 79.8 (3.14) | 75.7 (2.98) | 59.0 (2.32) | 41.5 (1.63) | 8.3 (0.33) | 0.6 (0.02) | 446 (17.55) |
| Average precipitation days (≥ 0.1 mm) | 2.0 | 2.8 | 7.5 | 11.2 | 14.5 | 12.9 | 12.3 | 12.1 | 13.3 | 13.3 | 4.5 | 1.1 | 107.5 |
| Average snowy days | 3.3 | 1.6 | 0.1 | 0.1 | 0 | 0 | 0 | 0 | 0 | 0 | 0.3 | 0.8 | 6.2 |
| Average relative humidity (%) | 54 | 54 | 54 | 56 | 59 | 62 | 65 | 66 | 71 | 71 | 64 | 56 | 61 |
| Mean monthly sunshine hours | 116.2 | 100.6 | 125.9 | 151.3 | 167.3 | 149.2 | 172.2 | 167.1 | 102.7 | 95.7 | 113.0 | 122.2 | 1,583.4 |
| Percentage possible sunshine | 36 | 32 | 34 | 39 | 39 | 35 | 40 | 41 | 28 | 27 | 36 | 40 | 36 |
Source: China Meteorological Administrationall-time record

== Transport ==
- China National Highway 212
- G8513 Pingliang–Mianyang Expressway (under construction)
