= Koutouba, Gansu =

Koutouba 口头坝乡
- Township
- Interactive map of Koutouba
- Country: China
- Province: Gansu
- County: Wen

Area
  - Total: 217 km^{2} (84 sq mi)

Population
  - Total: 6,960
  - Density: 32.1/km^{2} (83.1/sq mi)

Koutouba is a township of Wen County, Gansu, China. It was formerly known as Changnan township, which was created by merging Dujia and Changbei Township.

It is an agricultural township specialized in cultivating pepper, traditional Chinese medicine plants, vegetables, and in keeping pigs, chickens and bees.
