= Trà Lĩnh =

Trà Lĩnh Xã Trà Lĩnh
- Commune
- Trà Lĩnh commune
- Location within Vietnam
- Coordinates: 22°49′43″N 106°19′25″E
- Country: Vietnam
- Region: Northeast
- Province: Cao Bằng

Area
  - Total: 5.75 sq mi (14.90 km^{2})

Population (2019)
  - Total: 5.356
  - Density: 930/sq mi (359/km^{2})
- Time zone: UTC+7 (UTC + 7)

Trà Lĩnh is a commune of Cao Bằng Province. It is located near the China-Vietnam border and is a road border crossing between the two countries. The Longbang Port control point is located on the Chinese side of the border.

The commune was formerly named Hùng Quốc and was the district capital of former Trà Lĩnh District.
