= Battle of Đồng Đăng (1885) =

Part of the Sino-French War in Vietnam

- Part of the Sino-French War, Tonkin campaign
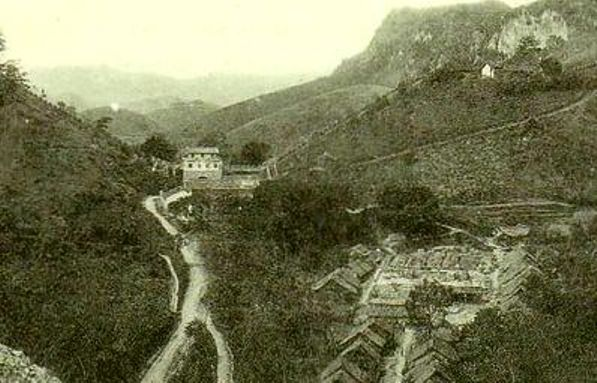
- The Gate of China, near Đồng Đăng
Date	23 February 1885
Location	Đồng Đăng, north of Lạng Sơn, northern Vietnam
Result	French victory

Belligerents
France	Qing dynasty

Commanders and leaders
François de Négrier; Paul-Gustave Herbinger	Pan Dingxin; Feng Zicai

Strength
2,000	6,000

Casualties and losses
9 killed 46 wounded	Unknown

The Battle of Đồng Đăng (23 February 1885) was an important French victory during the Sino-French War. The battle formed part of the French advance following the Lạng Sơn campaign and resulted in the temporary expulsion of Chinese forces from the Tonkin border region. After the battle, French forces destroyed the Gate of China at Zhennan Pass before withdrawing back toward Lạng Sơn. Three weeks later Chinese forces counterattacked, leading to the events that culminated in the Battle of Bang Bo. It is named after the town of Đồng Đăng, then in northern Tonkin, close to the border between China and Vietnam.

== Background ==
The battle was fought as part of the Lạng Sơn Campaign (3 to 13 February 1885), in which the French captured the Guangxi Army's base at Lạng Sơn.

On 16 February General Louis Brière de l'Isle, the commander of the Tonkin Expeditionary Corps, left Lạng Sơn with Giovanninelli's 1st Brigade to relieve the Siege of Tuyên Quang. Before his departure, he ordered General Oscar de Négrier, who would remain at Lạng Sơn with the 2nd Brigade, to press on towards the Chinese border and expel the battered remnants of the Guangxi Army from Tonkinese soil. After resupplying the 2nd Brigade, De Négrier advanced to attack the Guangxi Army at Đồng Đăng.

== French forces at Đồng Đăng ==
De Négrier's 2nd Brigade numbered just under 2,900 men in February 1885. The brigade's order of battle was as follows:

- 3rd Marching Regiment (Lieutenant-Colonel Herbinger)
  - 23rd Line Infantry Battalion (Lieutenant-Colonel Godart)
  - 111th Line Infantry Battalion (chef de bataillon Faure)
  - 143rd Line Infantry Battalion (chef de bataillon Farret)
- 4th Marching Regiment (Lieutenant-Colonel Donnier)
  - 2nd Foreign Legion Battalion (chef de bataillon Diguet)
  - 3rd Foreign Legion Battalion (Lieutenant-Colonel Schoeffer)
  - 2nd African Light Infantry Battalion (chef de bataillon Servière)
- 1st Battalion, 1st Tonkinese Rifle Regiment (chef de bataillon Jorna de Lacale)
- 3 artillery batteries (Captains Roperh, de Saxcé and Martin).

De Négrier advanced on Đồng Đăng with Herbinger's three line battalions, the two Foreign Legion battalions, a company of Tonkinese riflemen and Roperh and de Saxcé's batteries. Servière's 2nd African Battalion was left to guard Lạng Sơn and the brigade's supply line back to Chu. Martin's battery also remained at Lạng Sơn.

== Chinese positions ==
The left of the Chinese position lay along the hills directly to the east of the Mandarin Road, which were covered by the elevated infantry and artillery positions on the limestone massif. These positions were quite secure against a frontal attack as long as the massif itself remained in Chinese hands. To reach a position from which they could assault the limestone massif the French would first have to take Đồng Đăng, which lay directly in their way. The Chinese had deployed their right wing in and around Đồng Đăng. The small low-lying town was the weakest point in the Chinese position, but the Chinese had done what they could to strengthen it by building three strong forts on the hills to its west, overlooking the villages of Dong Tien and Pho Bu and the That Ke valley. These strongpoints, the ‘Western Forts’, were linked by a defensive line which contained Đồng Đăng itself. The Chinese could also rely on the Đồng Đăng stream, a fast-flowing arroyo which ran across the entire front of their line, to act as a moat for their defences and slow down any French attack.

== The battle of Đồng Đăng, 23 February 1885 ==
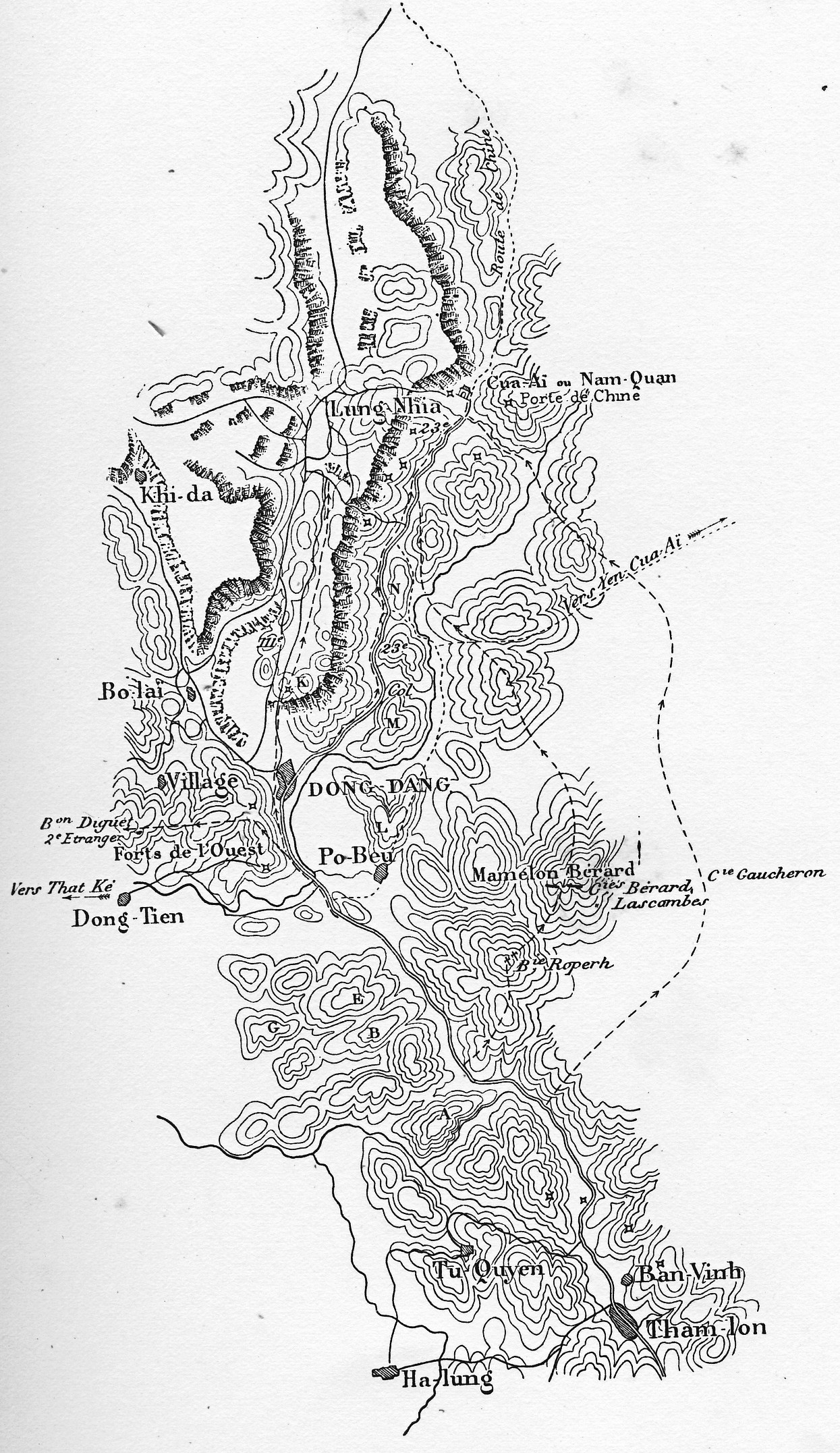
Map of the battle of Đồng Đăng, 23 February 1885

The French attack column left Lạng Sơn at 8:00 am on 23 February and followed the Mandarin Road towards Đồng Đăng. The road threaded its way along the defiles separating the steep mountains, passing through a number of small, abandoned villages. To guard against a possible Chinese surprise attack, chef de bataillon Tonnot led the way with an unusually strong advance guard—Diguet's Legion battalion, de Saxcé's battery, the Tonkinese skirmishers and the cavalry. Herbinger followed on behind with the rest of the infantry and Roperh's battery. The 143rd Battalion was split into individual companies for the day's operations. One company marched with the main body, a second formed the rearguard, and the remaining two were detached as escorts for the two artillery batteries.

At 9:30 am the French vanguard entered the village of Tham Lon and discovered some unoccupied Chinese forts above the nearby hamlet of Ban Vinh. Shortly afterwards it was engaged by a group of Chinese skirmishers, who began firing to warn their comrades of the French approach. Their fire was not dangerous and the French continued to press on, looking for ground where they could deploy into a line of battle. Tonnot deployed a section of de Saxcé's battery to give covering fire if necessary, but the Chinese fell back and occupied a rise at a right angle to the road. They were joined by other troops, and began to fire at the head of the French column.

The French vanguard now began to deploy into the hills on both sides of the Mandarin Road to face the Chinese skirmishers. De Négrier, attracted by the sound of the firing, joined Tonnot at the head of the French column. One kilometre (0.62 mi) to the north of Ban Vinh there was a tall hill which looked as though it would offer a good view of the Đồng Đăng valley, where the Chinese were presumably entrenched. This seemed to be the best position available for the French artillery, and de Négrier sent forward Bérard's Legion company to secure it. A party of Chinese skirmishers was occupying the hill, but the legionnaires drove them from it with little difficulty. De Négrier sent a galloper back to the column's main body with orders for Roperh to deploy his battery on the summit of the hill, now christened by the French 'Bérard Mound'. While Roperh struggled to get his guns up to the summit of Bérard Mound the brigade's vanguard fanned out on both sides of the Mandarin Road. Captain Geil's Tonkinese riflemen deployed just to the right of the road, linking up with Bérard's company, while the other three companies of Diguet's battalion deployed to the left.

=== Chinese spoiling attack ===
Tonnot's vanguard had won enough space for the brigade's main body to close up and deploy in its turn. De Négrier sent half of his troops to its left and the other half to its right. Diguet's legionnaires and Geil's Tonkinese now found themselves holding the centre of the French line. De Négrier had already decided to throw his right wing forward, in order to secure Bérard Mound for his artillery, and he now decided to refuse his left wing, deploying the brigade in a diagonal line of three mutually-supporting echelons astride the Mandarin Road. But this deployment, in hilly terrain, was a necessarily slow business, and at around midday the Chinese attempted to envelop both French flanks, perhaps hoping to catch them unprepared.

The Chinese attack on the French left, where de Négrier had refused his line, had little chance of success. The French left wing was held by the 23rd Line Battalion, which was occupying a hill to the southwest of the Mandarin Road behind and to the left of Diguet's legionnaires. The attackers, who issued in large numbers from the Western Forts, attempted to advance up the valley towards Ban Vinh to engage the 23rd Battalion. They had more than 2 kilometres (1.2 mi) to march, and before they had covered half this distance they came under fire from a section of French artillery and the three Legion companies deployed to the left of the Mandarin Road. It became clear that the attack was not going to succeed, and the Chinese fell back. The 23rd Battalion did not have to fire a shot in this action, and the Chinese made no further attempts to move against the French left.

By contrast, the Chinese attack on the right against Bérard Mound, occupied by Roperh's battery and its escorts and Bérard's Legion company, was pressed home vigorously. The Chinese infantry were in considerable strength, and on this occasion were adequately supported by their artillery, which began to engage Roperh's battery from its positions on the cliffs behind Đồng Đăng. The enemy gunners soon found the range and, uniquely during the Sino-French War, the French came under well-aimed artillery fire. Disconcerted by the speed and accuracy of the Chinese fire, Roperh's battery had to change position. De Négrier sent Commandant Schoeffer to Bérard Mound to reinforce its defenders with Lascombes and Gaucheron's companies from his own Legion battalion. Lascombes and Bérard then led their men in a counterattack against a hill overlooking the French position. Bérard was shot in the chest and seriously wounded during this counterattack, but Lieutenant de Féraudy immediately assumed command of his company and drove home the French charge. The Chinese fell back in disorder.

=== Capture of Đồng Đăng by 111th Battalion ===
Most of the houses in the southern part of the town had been set alight by the French artillery bombardment, and the position was now held only by small groups of Chinese skirmishers. Herbinger decided that the main assault on the town would be made by the 111th Battalion, screened by the Tonkinese and with Brunet and Michel's companies of Schoeffer's Legion battalion in support. The 111th had to advance across one kilometre (0.62 mi) of open ground, under fire from both the Chinese on the summit of the limestone massif and from a group of Chinese skirmishers in Đồng Đăng itself. The French conscripts moved forward at a brisk trot and eventually reached the Đồng Đăng stream, 200 metres (660 ft) from the outskirts of the town. Here they hesitated. Men began to fall to the enemy's fire. The company officers jumped into the stream to set an example, and waded through waist-high water to the other side. Once they clambered onto dry land the soldiers had only one thought: to reach the shelter of Đồng Đăng and escape from the plunging fire from the limestone massif. In complete disorder, running at full tilt to close the distance as quickly as possible, the young soldiers of the 111th Battalion charged wildly into the blazing town. The astonished company officers raced to place themselves at the front of this impromptu charge, waving their swords above their heads to spur on their men to yet greater efforts. The speed and fury of this improvised attack took the Chinese skirmishers completely by surprise. They tried to evacuate Đồng Đăng but were not fast enough. The soldiers of the 111th trapped laggards in the streets or inside houses, and clubbed or bayoneted them to death. The 111th Battalion then reformed inside Đồng Đăng, where it was in reasonable cover from the Chinese on the limestone massif.

=== French attack on the limestone massif ===
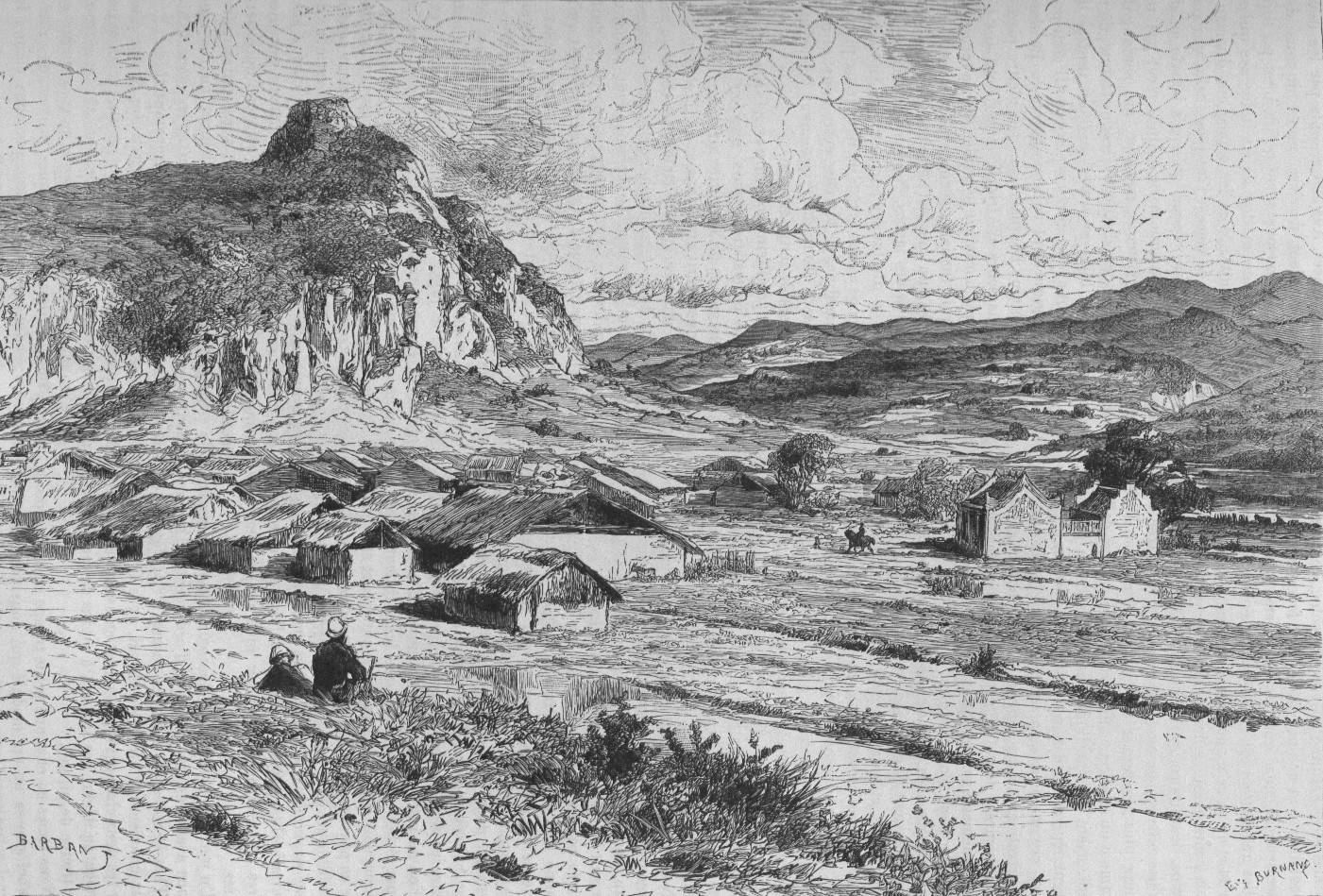
View of Đồng Đăng and the limestone massif to its north, October 1885

The 23rd Battalion, which had seen little of the battle so far, came up from its position on the French left wing to add its weight to the attack. Herbinger then led both line battalions forward up the slopes to the west of the massif. Schoeffer's two Legion companies followed behind, still in support. Geil's Tonkinese had charged with the 111th into Đồng Đăng, and Herbinger ordered them to secure Đồng Đăng while the French attacked the key point in the Chinese line.

Once the 111th Battalion moved out of Đồng Đăng, it again came under plunging fire from the summit of the massif. Again, men began to fall as the battalion scrambled up the slopes as fast as it could. Faure deployed the battalion's four companies into skirmish order, with three companies up and one in support. The forward company on the right, closest to the Chinese positions, took the heaviest casualties, and 2nd Lieutenant Émile Portier was mortally wounded as it advanced. Despite its casualties the 111th pressed on up the slopes to the attack. Lieutenant de Colomb captured the foremost Chinese trench with his company, but resistance then stiffened and the entire battalion had to be thrown against the Chinese entrenchments before they were taken.

With the Chinese right wing falling back towards That Ke, the French proceeded to throw back the Chinese still holding out on the summit of the limestone massif. The 111th Battalion and the two supporting Legion companies had already reached the summit at its southern tip and now moved along its eastern edge, clearing the enemy from their vantage points above the Mandarin Road. Small parties of Chinese clung to several isolated rocks, but were soon prised out of these positions by the French infantry.

=== Mopping up operations ===
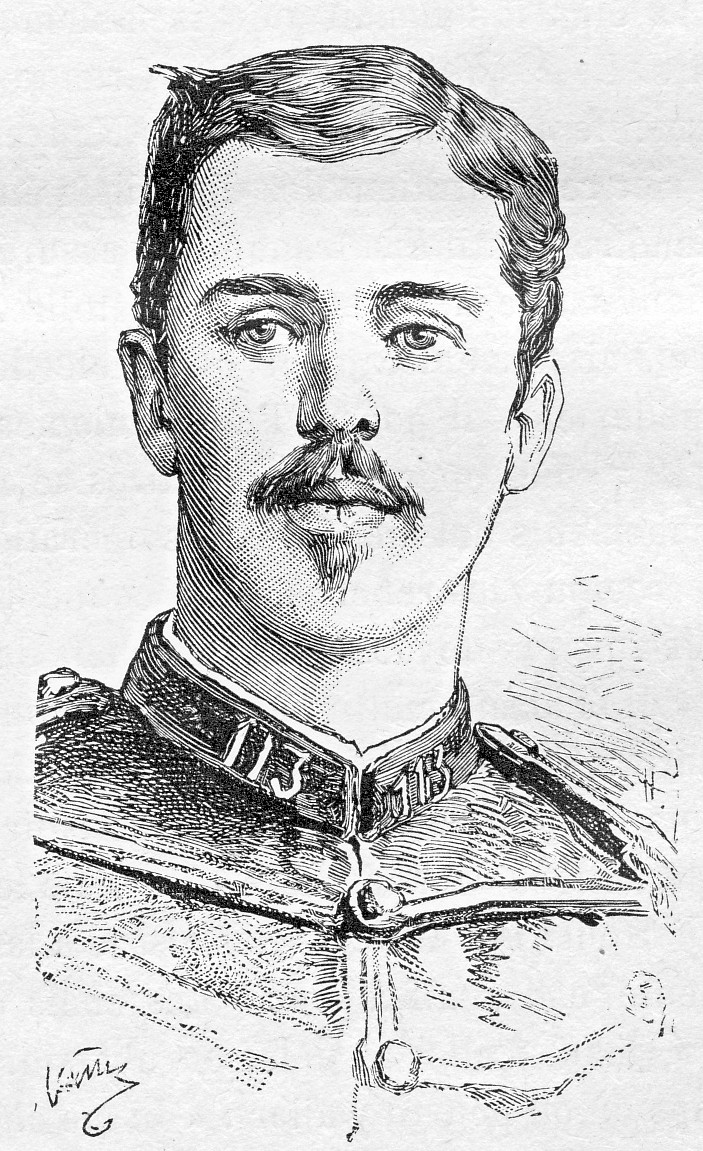
2nd Lieutenant Émile Portier, mortally wounded at Đồng Đăng, 23 February 1885

It only remained to deal with a strong enemy force holding a hill just to the northeast of Đồng Đăng, which overlooked the entrance to the valley leading to the Chinese frontier and prevented the French from advancing up the Mandarin Road. Geil led his Tonkinese forward from Đồng Đăng to pin the Chinese frontally, de Saxcé's battery occupied a hill just to the north of Pho Bu from which it could engage them at close range, and Lascombes and de Féraudy's Legion companies began to work their way around their flank. Realising that their position would soon become untenable, the Chinese retreated before they could be forced from it.

With the enemy in full retreat either towards That Ke or back into China, de Négrier ordered the two foremost companies of Diguet's battalion to remain in position astride the path to That Ke, the 111th Battalion to secure the limestone massif, and the rest of the brigade to close up on the village of Cua Ai and the Gate of China. The first units to reach the Gate of China were Brunet and Michel's companies of Schoeffer's battalion, which had left the 111th Battalion alone on the summit of the limestone massif and climbed back down to the plain. The gate itself was protected by two flanking forts and trenches had also been dug along the slopes of the neighbouring hills, but the Chinese troops occupying these defences had been brought forward during the battle to join their comrades around Đồng Đăng. When their lines broke, the French pursued them so closely that they were unable to rally in these positions. As a result, the legionnaires occupied the Gate of China and pushed on across the frontier into China without meeting any resistance. The rest of the brigade gradually came up to Cua Ai. Lascombes and de Féraudy's companies, on the hills to the east of the Mandarin Road, made their way down into the Đồng Đăng valley and reached the Gate of China shortly after Schoeffer's men. On the extreme right Schoeffer pulled in Gaucheron's company, which had served as a flankguard for most of the afternoon. Finally, Geil's Tonkinese riflemen and the 23rd Battalion followed the road. By nightfall the bulk of the 2nd Brigade was assembled at the Gate of China.

An important factor in the Chinese defeat at Đồng Đăng was the failure of the Chinese commander Pan Dingxin (潘鼎新) to concentrate his forces to meet the French attack. A sizeable contingent of fresh troops under the command of Feng Zicai (馮子才) was left to cover a border crossing several kilometres to the east of Đồng Đăng, and took no part in the battle.

== Casualties ==
French casualties at Đồng Đăng were light: 9 dead and 46 wounded.

== The destruction of the Gate of China, 25 February 1885 ==
After clearing the Chinese from Tonkinese territory the French crossed briefly into Guangxi province. The news that the French were on Chinese soil caused panic in Longzhou (Lung-chou, 龍州) and other provincial towns close to the Vietnamese border. Many Chinese civilians left their homes and fled down the West River to take refuge from the invaders.

On 25 February the French blew up the 'Gate of China', an elaborate Chinese customs building on the Tonkin–Guangxi border at Zhennan Pass. De Négrier erected a wooden placard on the ruins of the Gate of China, inscribed in Chinese with the words 'It is not stone walls that protect frontiers, but the faithful execution of treaties'. The message was a pointed allusion to the Bắc Lệ ambush in June 1884, in French eyes a treacherous violation by the Chinese of the terms of the Tientsin Accord, signed between France and China on 11 May 1884.

The 2nd Brigade was not strong enough to push on further into China, and de Négrier returned to Lạng Sơn with the bulk of the brigade at the end of February. A small French garrison under the command of Lieutenant-Colonel Herbinger was left at Đồng Đăng to watch the movements of the Guangxi Army.

Three weeks later the Chinese attacked the Đồng Đăng garrison, precipitating a series of events that led to the French defeat at the Battle of Bang Bo (24 March 1885).

== See also ==
- French colonial empire – Overseas territories controlled by France (1534–1980)
- Imperialism in Asia
- Jules Ferry – French Prime Minister in the 1800s
