= Tien Yen–Lang Son–Cao Bang Expressway =

Road in Vietnam

CT.10 Expressway
- Quang Ninh–Lang Son–Cao Bang Expressway
- Đường cao tốc Quảng Ninh – Lạng Sơn – Cao Bằng
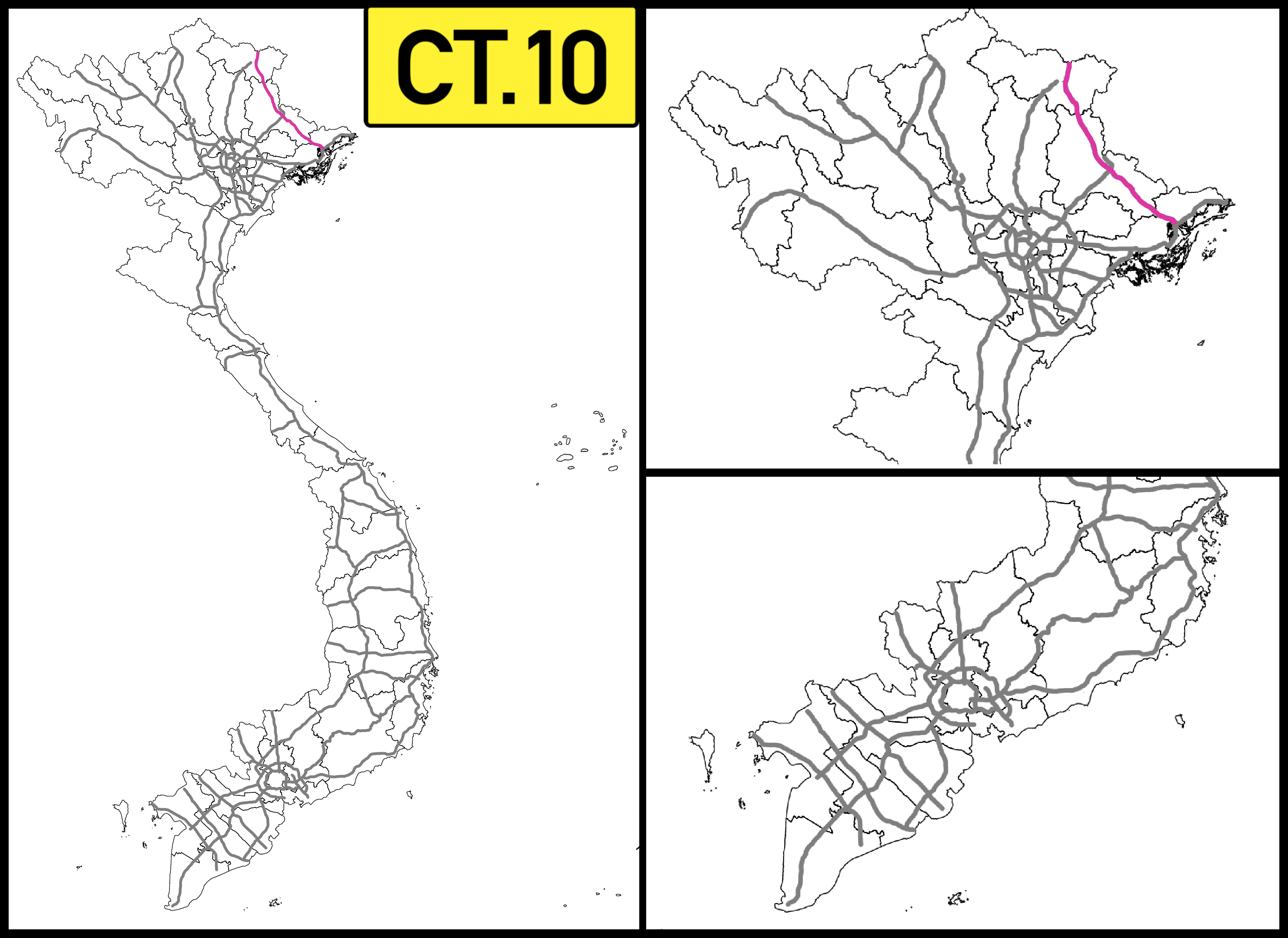

Route information
- Length: 215 km (134 mi)

Major junctions
- South end: in Tiên Yên
- in Tiên Yên: at Đình Lập; (via) at Yên Trạch; at Văn Lãng; at Đông Khê; at Hòa An
- North end: G69 at Trà Lĩnh Border Gate, Chinese border

Location
- Country: Vietnam

Highway system
- Transport in Vietnam
← CT.09	→ CT.11

The Quang Ninh–Lang Son–Cao Bang Expressway (Vietnamese: Đường cao tốc Tiên Yên – Lạng Sơn – Cao Bằng) is a planned expressway in Vietnam. It will connect Tiên Yên with Trà Lĩnh, a border town further north. It will run roughly parallel to National Road 4A. The road is envisioned as a part of an economic corridor from Haiphong to Chongqing and Europe through Khorgos. The government also expects the expressway to bring Cao Bằng Province economically and culturally closer to the political center Hanoi.

Before 2021, the Dong Dang–Tra Linh section was formerly part of the CT.03 Hanoi–Cao Bang Expressway before the Hanoi–Lang Son section was merged into the CT.01 North–South Expressway East.

== Development ==
=== Tien Yen–Dong Dang section ===
Construction expected to begin after 2030.

=== Dong Dang–Tra Linh section ===
Construction is expected to begin at the end of 2023, and should be completed before 2030.
