= Trà Lĩnh district =

Coordinates: 22.833°N 106.333°E

Trà Lĩnh District Huyện Trà Lĩnh
- Former District
- Interactive map of Trà Lĩnh District
- Country: Vietnam
- Region: Northeast
- Province: Cao Bằng
- Established: 1958 (renamed from Trấn Biên district)
- Dissolved: 2020
- District capital: Hùng Quốc (now called Trà Lĩnh)
- Subdivisions: List: 1 town; 7 communes

Trà Lĩnh is a former district of Cao Bằng province in the Northeast region of Vietnam. As of 2009, the district had a population of 21,558. The district covers an area of 257 km^{2}. The district capital lies at Hùng Quốc.

Trà Lĩnh district was subdivided to 10 commune-level subdivisions, including Hùng Quốc township (district capital) and the rural communes of: Tri Phương, Cô Mười, Quang Hán, Quang Vinh, Lưu Ngọc, Cao Chương, Quốc Toản, Xuân Nội and Quang Trung.

On February 1, 2020, prior to the district's annexation, the communes of Lưu Ngọc & Cô Mười were merged into Quang Vinh & Quang Hán, respectively. This reorganization left Trà Lĩnh district with 1 township and 7 rural communes.

On February 11, 2020, the district was annexed by Trùng Khánh district.

== Border crossing ==
There is a border crossing into China. The town on the opposite side is Longbang.
