= Gekko wenxianensis =

Scientific classification
- Kingdom: Animalia
- Phylum: Chordata
- Class: Reptilia
- Order: Squamata
- Suborder: Gekkota
- Family: Gekkonidae
- Genus: Gekko
- Species: G. wenxianensis

Binomial name
- Gekko wenxianensis Zhou & Wang, 2008

Species of lizard

Gekko wenxianensis is a species of gecko. It is endemic to the Qin Mountains in Gansu, China. At the time of its species description, it was the 12th recorded Gekko species in China.

Gekko wenxianensis was described from specimens collected from west Qin Mountains, China

== Etymology ==
The specific name wenxianensis refers to its type locality, Wen County, Gansu (Chinese: 文县; pinyin: Wénxiàn).

== Description ==
It is characterized by its nasal-rostral contact and moderately sized body. Its body has dorsal tubercles extending from the occiput and temporal regions to the back and tail base, but are lacking on the forelimb and thigh. It counts with 6–8 pre-cloacal pores in a continuous series in males, and a tail generally with two cloacal spurs on each side. Snout–vent length varied between 52 and 59 mm (2.0 and 2.3 in) among the males and females in the type series.

== Habitat ==
The type series originates from the south slope of the west Qin Mountains at an elevation of 905 m (2,969 ft) above sea level. No other information on the habitat of this species is included in the species description.
