= Li Ping =

Li Ping is the name of:

- Li Yan (Three Kingdoms) or Li Ping (died 234), official and general of Shu Han during the Three Kingdoms period
- Li Ping (geologist) (1924–2019), Chinese geologist and earthquake engineer
- Ping Li (psychologist), Chinese-born psycholinguists at Pennsylvania State University
- Li Ping (table tennis) (born 1986), Chinese-born Qatari table tennis player
- Li Ping (weightlifter) (born 1988), Chinese weightlifter
- Li Ping, fictional character in the novel The Legend of the Condor Heroes, see List of The Legend of the Condor Heroes characters

== See also ==
- Liping (disambiguation)
