= Battle of Đồng Đăng (1979) =

1979 battle of the Sino-Vietnamese War

- Part of the Battle of Lạng Sơn, Sino–Vietnamese War
Date	17–23 February 1979
Location	Đồng Đăng and vicinity, Lạng Sơn Province, Vietnam
Result	Chinese victory

Belligerents
China	Vietnam

Commanders and leaders
Xu Shiyou; Zhu Yuehua	Nguyễn Duy Thương; Nguyễn Xuân Khánh

Units involved
55th Army: 163rd Division; 164th Division; 165th Division; 54th Army: Unit 33980	Vietnamese sources: 700 men 3rd Division: 42nd Local Company (regular units).; 5th Armed Police Company

Casualties and losses
Chinese source: 531 killed out of 2,220 casualties Vietnamese source: 2,400 killed 21 tanks destroyed.	Chinese source: 3,973 killed Vietnamese source: 194 regular casualties, only six regular survivors escaped the French Fortress (42nd Company). 271 casualties (5th company, border military, local guerrillas around Đồng Đăng combined).

The Battle of Đồng Đăng was the initial phase of the Battle of Lạng Sơn during the Sino–Vietnamese War, taking place in the town of Đồng Đăng and nearby positions between 17 and 23 February 1979.

== Battle ==
The Chinese People's Liberation Army (PLA) began their operations at 05:00 on 17 February with a barrage of more than 6,000 artillery shells pounding on Vietnamese strongpoints and gun positions. The Chinese had paved the way for their offensive throughout the night before by infiltrating the Vietnamese territory, cutting telephone lines and conducting sabotages. Waves of PLA troops from the 55th Army quickly overwhelmed Hill 386, a position situated 1.5 km south of the border, killing 118 Vietnamese soldiers. Though pockets of resistance were continued near the Friendship Pass and in Đồng Đăng, most of the Vietnamese defense was by then undertaken by the Vietnam People's Army (VPA) 12th Regiment southerly in the area around the hamlet of Thâm Mô. The hamlet was situated on a low hill nearby the intersection of Highways 4A and 1B and Lạng Sơn–Nanning railroad, with Hills 423 and 505 in the east and Hill 339 in the west. The headquarters of the 12th Regiment was set up on Hill 438, located 1,000 m to the west of Hill 339. Between Thâm Mô and Hill 339 was the French Fort, a large fortification supported by 1.5-meter-thick concrete wall lying on a hill to the southwest of Đồng Đăng. The fort, together with Thâm Mô and Hill 339, created a triangular mutually-supporting defensive structure, which was able to provide fire suppression against any attack on Đồng Đăng.

After taking Hill 386, the PLA 163rd Division was tasked with capturing Đồng Đăng, as well as striking Thâm Mô and Hills 339, 423, and 505. The attack was backed by small groups of tanks arriving on Highway 4A. These initial assaults were thwarted with heavy losses, which included nearly half of the tanks supporting the PLA 163rd Division. The PLA responded by conducting two enveloping thrusts on the flanks of the Thâm Mô perimeter; one was carried out by Unit 33980 of the 54th Army to the east of Thâm Mô on the village of Thâm Lũng, and another was on Cồn Khoang, a position in the rear of Hill 339.

Chinese movement against Cồn Khoang was ambushed by the VPA 63rd Company at about 09:00 with an additional Vietnamese platoon moving in behind the enemy to block their retreatment, resulting in the decimation of one Chinese battalion. At Thâm Lũng, Chinese launched massed attacks on several surrounding hills, which were stiffly contained by the defenders. On 18 February, a Vietnamese counter-attack launched by the VPA 2nd Regiment drove PLA units back to their assemble positions on Hills 409, 611, and 675; this pattern was repeated on the following days. On 23 February, the PLA stormed Phai Môn, a position to the east of Thâm Lũng, using six waves of attacks, of which all were rebuffed. Chinese forces had to launch twelve more charges throughout the day to finally break through Thâm Lũng.

In the Thâm Mô area, Chinese charges in mass formations had been continuously repulsed with heavy casualties. The Chinese field commanders had to switch their tactics, using small-unit attacks to flank Vietnamese positions instead of frontal attacks by human waves. In the evening of (19 February), the PLA launched a new wave of attacks against the Thâm Mô line, committing one company to the French Fort, one battalion to Thâm Mô and another to Hill 339. The Vietnamese forces, again, successfully held on their positions and fought off the assaults, taking a high toll on the attackers. Half of the Chinese company from the 489th Regiment assigned to capture the French Fort were lost in the assault. On (21 February), after receiving reinforcements, Chinese troops renewed their attack on the French Fort, securing most of the ground around it in a four-hour engagement. After unsuccessful attempts to negotiate, the Chinese then used gasoline, explosives, and flamethrowers to demolish the fort, killing approximately 800 Vietnamese soldiers and civilians sheltering inside. At 20:00 on 22 February, Thâm Mô finally fell to the hands of the PLA 163rd Division.

A Vietnamese veteran named Nguyễn Duy Thực told that one of his comrades told him that he saw behind a Chinese battalion was marching into the town of Đồng Đăng was partisans team followed to support. They entered every houses to catch chickens, catch pigs, down the lakes to catch fish ... These troops set up explosives and destroyed every civilians houses. On the way back to the French fort, his comrades found and shot some Chinese soldiers. As he ran through the bodies, he saw a dead Chinese in a two-handed pose holding a bag of sweet potatoes.

On 23 February, Chinese forces eventually captured the town of Đồng Đăng.

In 1980, from many scene videos were taken from this brutally battle, Vietnamese director Vũ Hải Ninh made a war movie named "Đất Mẹ" (The Motherland) to show this harsh war front and to boost the Vietnamese nationalism.

== See also ==
- Battle of Lang Son (1979)

== Sources ==
- Edward C. O'Dowd (2007). Chinese Military Strategy in the Third Indochina War: The Last Maoist War. New York: Routledge. ISBN 978-0203088968.
- Xiaoming Zhang (2015). Deng Xiaoping's Long War: The Military Conflict between China and Vietnam, 1979-1991. University of North Carolina Press. ISBN 9781469621258.
