= Hạ Lang district =

Coordinates: 22.750°N 106.750°E

Hạ Lang district Huyện Hạ Lang
- District
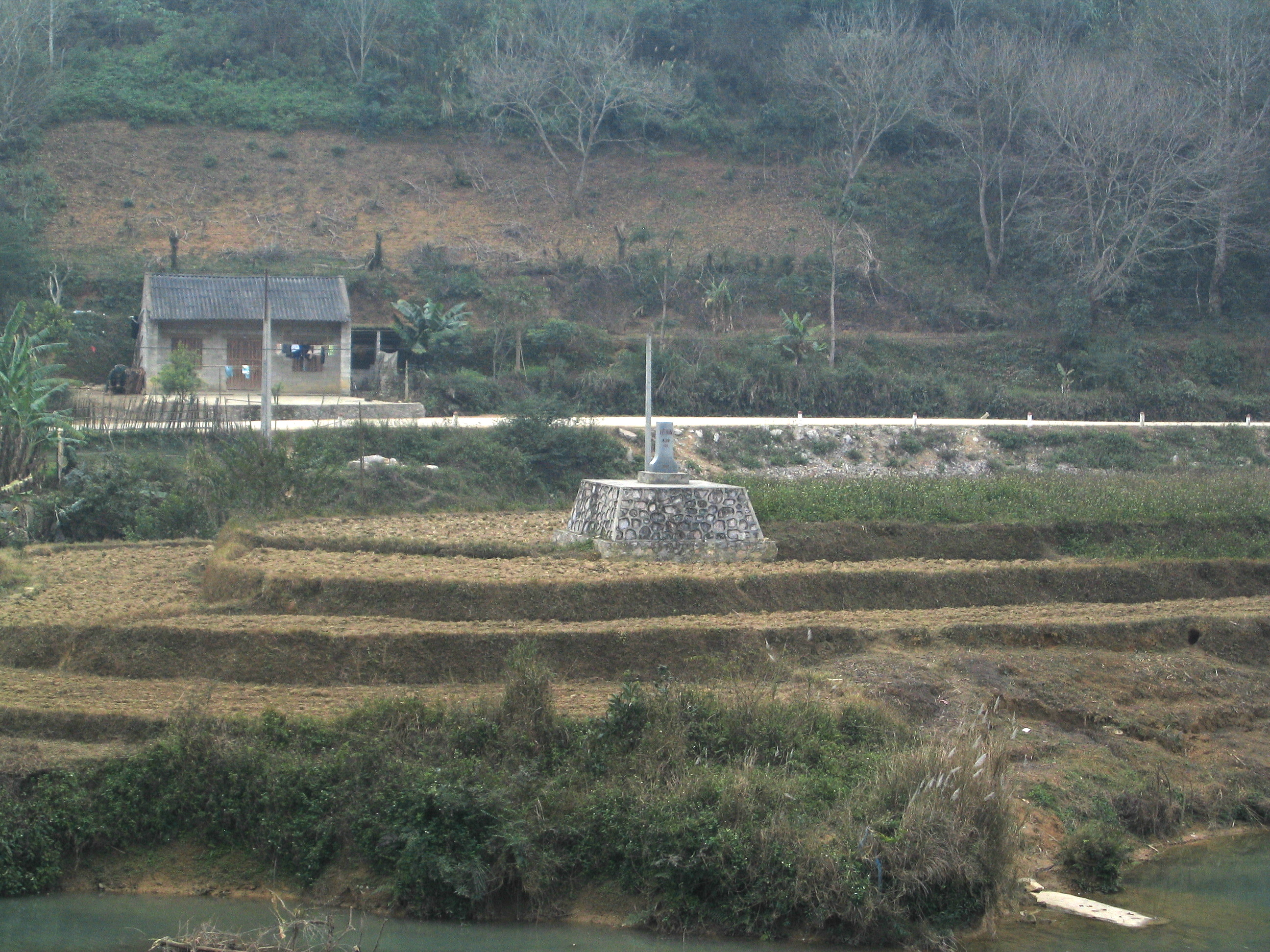
- View of Minh Long
- Interactive map of Hạ Lang district
- Country: Vietnam
- Region: Northeast
- Province: Cao Bằng
- Capital: Thanh Nhật

Area
  - Total: 179 sq mi (463 km^{2})

Population (2003)
  - Total: 26,330
- Time zone: UTC+7 (Indochina Time)

Hạ Lang is a former rural district of Cao Bằng province in the Northeast region of Vietnam. As of 2003 the district had a population of 26,330. The district covers an area of 463 km^{2}. The district capital lies at Thanh Nhật.
