= Liping, Gansu =

Liping 黎坪乡
- Town
- Location within China Location within Gansu
- Coordinates: 33.1832465°N 104.8881326°E
- Country: China
- Province: Gansu
- Prefecture-level city: Longnan
- County: Wen

Area
  - Total: 171 km^{2} (66 sq mi)

Population (2008)
  - Total: 13,024
  - Density: 76.2/km^{2} (197/sq mi)
  - Tibetan: 591
  - Hui: 61

Liping (黎坪镇) is a town in Wen County, Gansu, China. In 2008 it had a population of 13,024. The township's administrative centre is in Lijiaba village (李家坝), and it governs over 22 administrative villages. In 2016 it was upgraded from township to town.

The town is named after pear orchards in the area, which was reflected in its original name, also Liping but written as 梨坪乡. It was established in 1949. The township has a small minority of Tibetan and/or Baima (who are officially counted as Tibetan), and Hui inhabitants.
