= Friendship Pass =

Mountain pass near the China-Vietnam border

Coordinates: 21°58′35″N 106°42′44″E

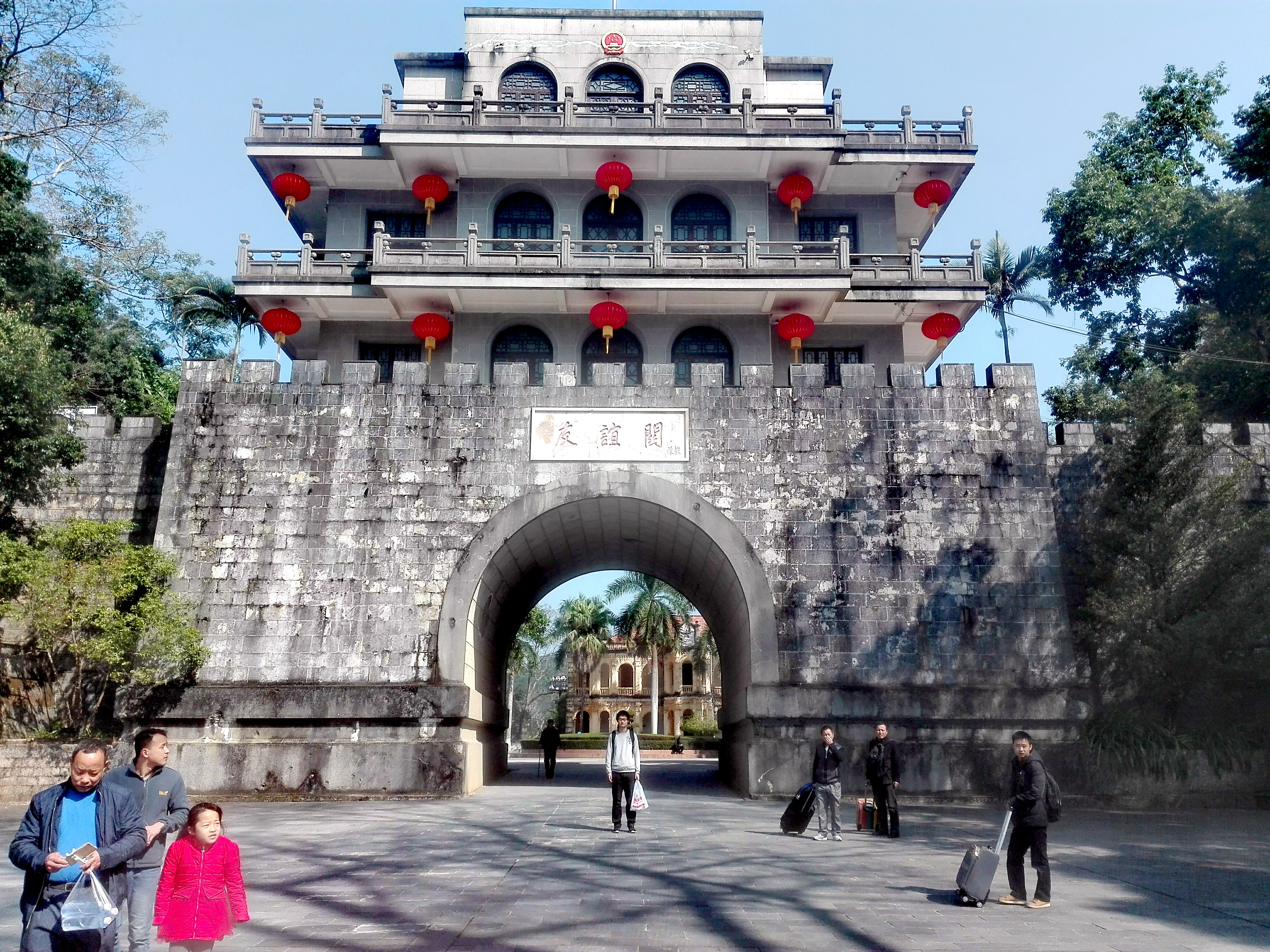

Chinese name
- Traditional Chinese: 友誼關
- Simplified Chinese: 友谊关
Transcriptions
Standard Mandarin
- Hanyu Pinyin: Yǒuyì Guān
Yue: Cantonese
- Yale Romanization: Yáuh Yìh Gwāan
- Jyutping: Jau5 Ji4 Gwaan1

Vietnamese name
- Vietnamese alphabet: Hữu Nghị Quan; Nam Quan
- Chữ Hán: 友誼關 南關

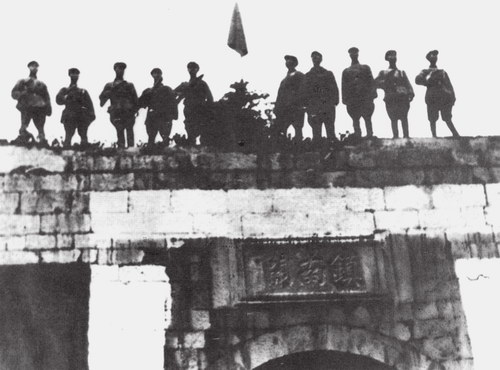
People's Liberation Army troops entered Friendship Pass on 11 December 1949.

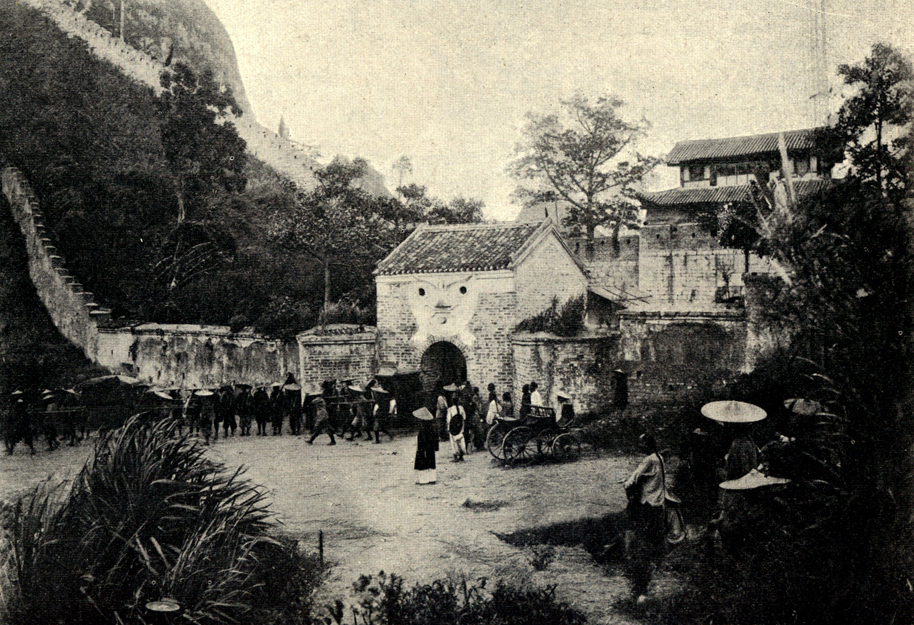
Marshal Su Yuanchun and his entourage passing through the since-removed outer gatehouse on 16 July 1900.

Friendship Pass (traditional Chinese: 友誼關; simplified Chinese: 友谊关; Vietnamese: Hữu Nghị Quan), also commonly known by its older name Ải Nam Quan (traditional Chinese: 隘南關; simplified Chinese: 隘南关), is a pass near the China-Vietnam border, between China's Guangxi and Vietnam's Lạng Sơn province. The pass itself lies just inside the Chinese side of the border.

Vietnamese National Route 1 starts at the border near this pass, which lies less than 5 km north of the town of Đồng Đăng in Lạng Sơn province, ending in Năm Căn in Cà Mau province. China National Highway 322 runs from here to Guangxi province and Hunan province. This is one of the busiest border trading points of Vietnam.

It was built in the early Ming dynasty with the name of "South Suppressing Pass" (traditional Chinese: 鎮南關; simplified Chinese: 镇南关; Vietnamese: Trấn Nam Quan). In 1953, its name was changed to "South Harmonious Pass" (traditional Chinese: 睦南關; simplified Chinese: 睦南关; Vietnamese: Mục Nam Quan). In 1965, its name was changed again to the current Friendship Pass, reflecting the close political, military, and economic ties between the People's Republic of China and North Vietnam during the then-ongoing Vietnam War.

== History ==
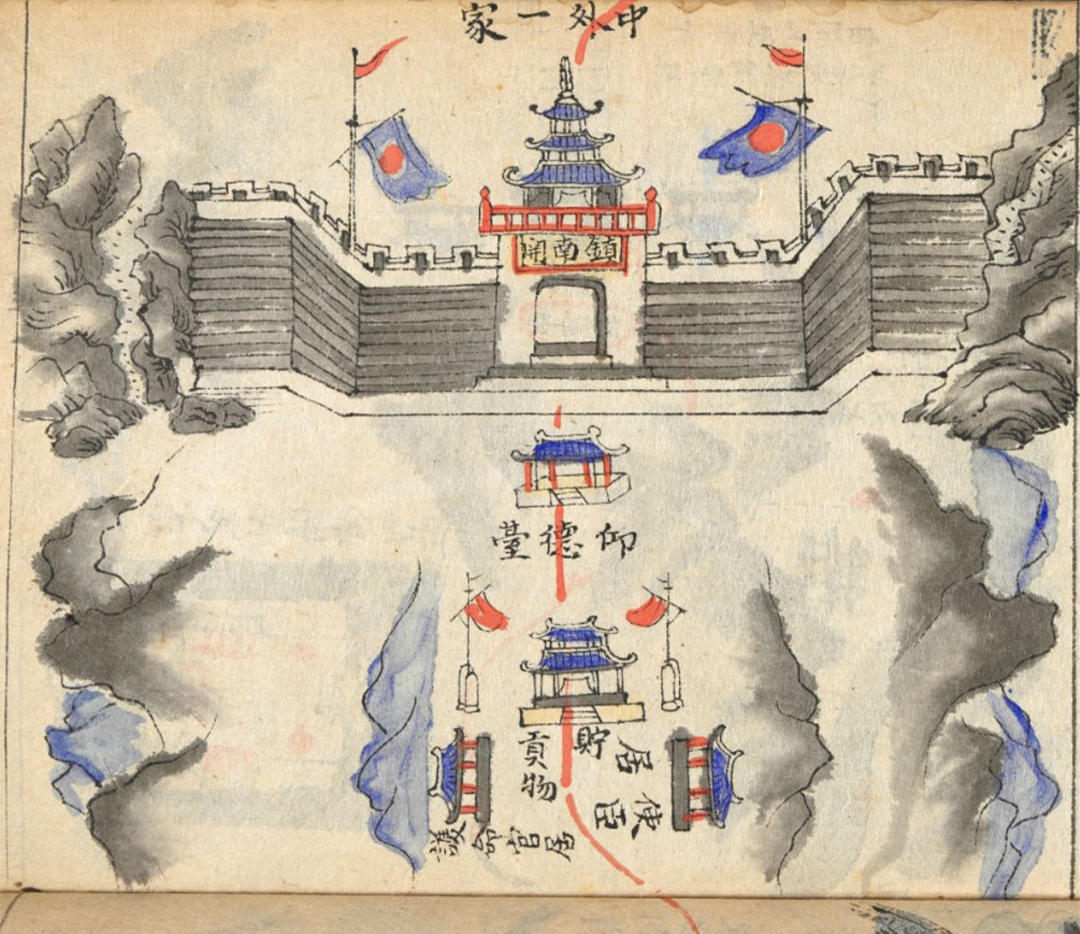
Picture from Bắc sứ thủy lục địa đồ (北使水陸地圗), depicting the "South Suppressing Pass" (Trấn Nam quan; 鎮南關) in 1880 (Tự Đức Canh Thìn niên; 嗣徳庚辰年).

Traditionally, the pass served as the exact border between China and Vietnam, hence there is also a Vietnamese historical saying: "Nước Việt Nam ta trải dài từ Ải Nam Quan đến mũi Cà Mau," translated as "The Vietnamese nation stretches from Ải Nam Quan to Cape Cà Mau". However, since the Franco-Qing Convention of 1887, the border has been determined to be south of the Pass itself, putting it entirely within Chinese territory, in Pingxiang, Chongzuo County, Guangxi Autonomous Region, and the official border between the two nations is beyond this pass. A border stone No. 18 was erected and represented on an 1894 map to be "along the road from Đồng Đăng to Nam Quan", but has since been lost. When China and Vietnam negotiated for a new border, both recognized the 1887 border to be a legal reference point through an agreement signed in 1993, and both chose to draw the border south of, although at different distances away from, the Pass, later agreeing on a compromise. The new border was confirmed by Chinese and Vietnamese officials by a border treaty enacted in June 2000, causing controversy among some Vietnamese as well as members of Vietnamese diaspora, who deemed it a "concession" to China.
