= Văn Lãng district =

Coordinates: 22°03′17″N 106°36′48″E

Vãn Lãng district Huyện Văn Lãng
- District
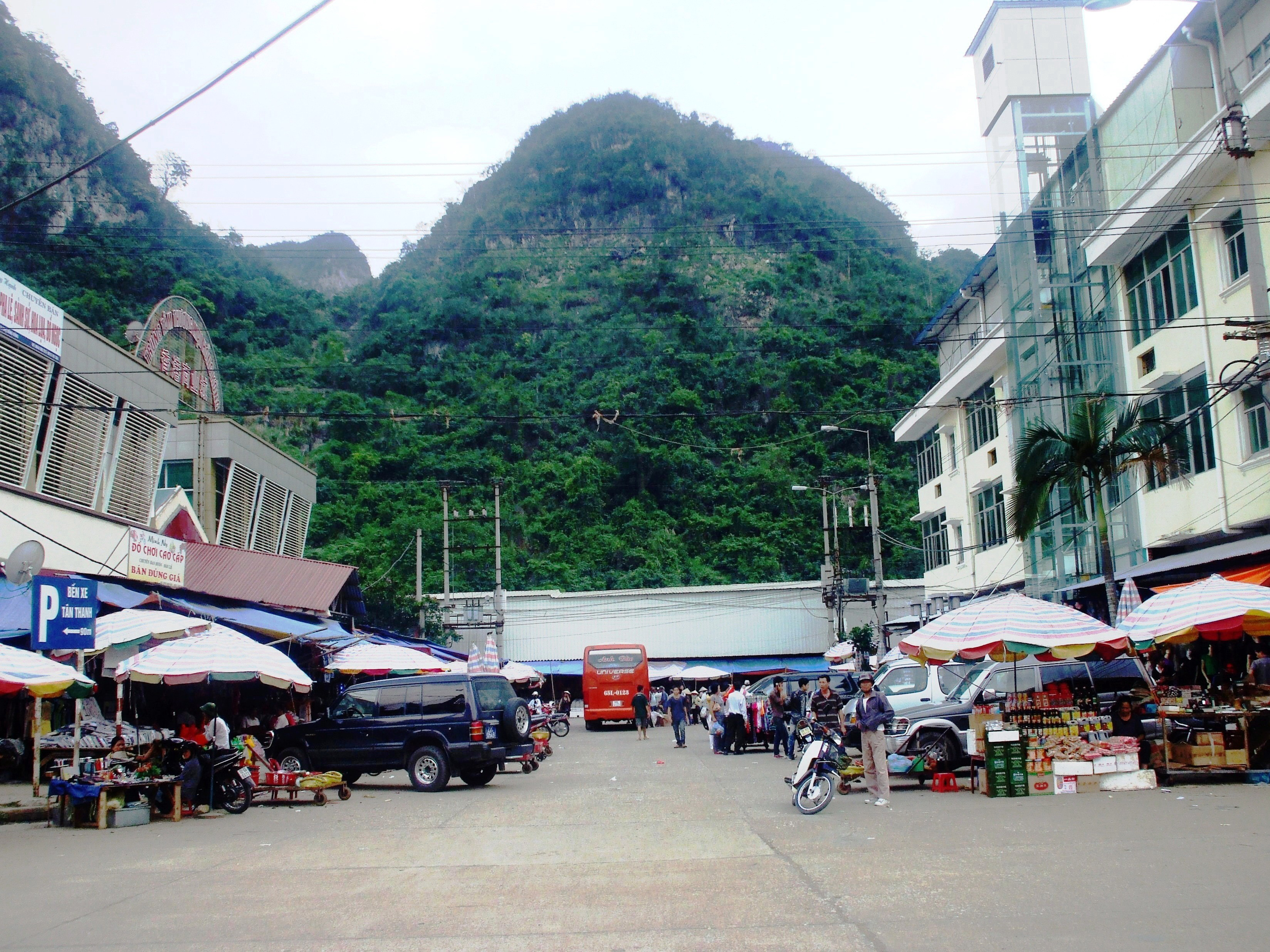
- Tân Thanh market is located in Van Lang district, Lang Son province (Vietnam). This is a market in the northern border area, selling all kinds of goods, especially goods originating from China.
- Interactive map of Vãn Lãng district
- Country: Vietnam
- Region: Northeast
- Province: Lạng Sơn
- Capital: Na Sầm

Area
  - Total: 217 sq mi (561 km^{2})

Population (2003)
  - Total: 50,210
- Time zone: UTC+7 (Indochina Time)

Văn Lãng is a former rural district of Lạng Sơn province in the Northeast region of Vietnam. As of 2003 the district had a population of 50,210. The district covers an area of 561 km^{2}. The district capital lies at Na Sầm.
