= Trùng Khánh district =

Coordinates: 22.833°N 106.583°E

Trùng Khánh district Huyện Trùng Khánh
- District
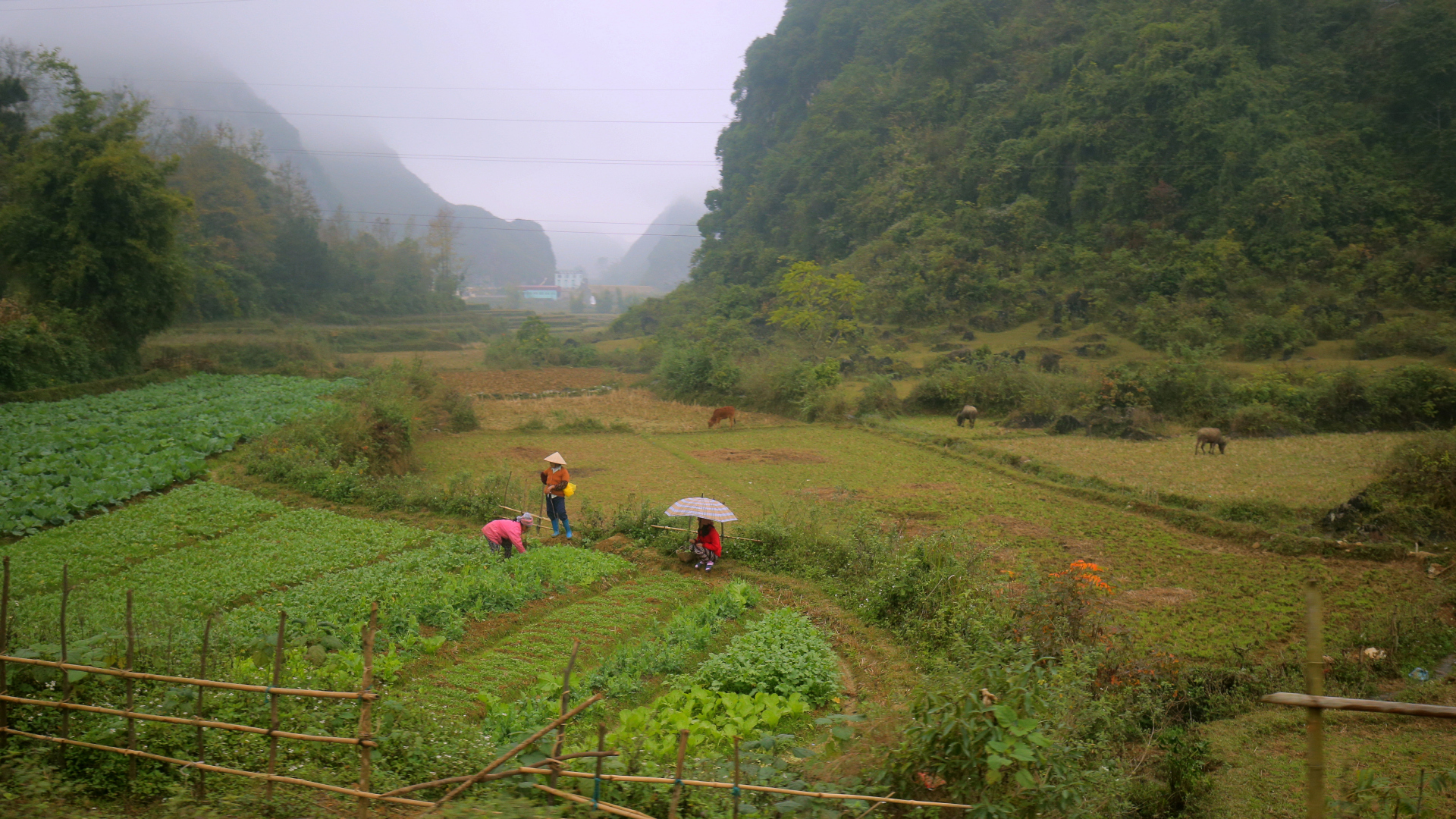
- Interactive map of Trùng Khánh district
- Country: Vietnam
- Region: Northeast
- Province: Cao Bằng
- Capital: Trùng Khánh

Area
  - Total: 688.01 km^{2} (265.64 sq mi)

Population (2020)
  - Total: 70,424
  - Density: 102/km^{2} (260/sq mi)
- Time zone: UTC+7 (Indochina Time)

Trùng Khánh is a former rural district (huyện) of Cao Bằng province in the Northeast region of Vietnam.

As of 2020 the district had a population of 70,424. The district covers an area of 688.01 km^{2}. The district capital lies at Trùng Khánh.

The district is famous for its Chinese chestnut.

== Administrative divisions ==
Trùng Khánh district is subdivided to 21 commune-level subdivisions, including the townships of Hùng Quốc, Trùng Khánh and the rural communes of: Cao Chương, Cao Thăng, Chí Viễn, Đàm Thủy, Đình Phong, Đoài Dương, Đức Hồng, Khâm Thành, Lăng Hiếu, Ngọc Côn, Ngọc Khê, Phong Châu, Phong Nặm, Quang Hán, Quang Trung, Quang Vinh, Tri Phương, Trung Phúc, Xuân Nội.

== Climate ==
Climate data for Trùng Khánh, elevation 520 m (1,710 ft)
Month	Jan	Feb	Mar	Apr	May	Jun	Jul	Aug	Sep	Oct	Nov	Dec	Year
Record high °C (°F)	29.1 (84.4)	32.5 (90.5)	34.0 (93.2)	37.2 (99.0)	37.7 (99.9)	37.0 (98.6)	37.3 (99.1)	36.5 (97.7)	36.3 (97.3)	34.4 (93.9)	31.8 (89.2)	29.4 (84.9)	37.7 (99.9)
Mean daily maximum °C (°F)	15.8 (60.4)	17.4 (63.3)	20.8 (69.4)	25.1 (77.2)	28.5 (83.3)	29.9 (85.8)	30.3 (86.5)	30.3 (86.5)	29.0 (84.2)	26.0 (78.8)	22.2 (72.0)	18.3 (64.9)	24.5 (76.1)
Daily mean °C (°F)	11.8 (53.2)	13.6 (56.5)	17.1 (62.8)	21.2 (70.2)	24.2 (75.6)	25.7 (78.3)	26.0 (78.8)	25.6 (78.1)	24.0 (75.2)	21.0 (69.8)	17.1 (62.8)	13.2 (55.8)	20.0 (68.0)
Mean daily minimum °C (°F)	9.0 (48.2)	11.0 (51.8)	14.5 (58.1)	18.3 (64.9)	21.1 (70.0)	22.8 (73.0)	23.3 (73.9)	22.6 (72.7)	20.7 (69.3)	17.6 (63.7)	13.5 (56.3)	9.7 (49.5)	17.0 (62.6)
Record low °C (°F)	−3.0 (26.6)	−0.6 (30.9)	0.8 (33.4)	7.0 (44.6)	11.0 (51.8)	13.9 (57.0)	17.4 (63.3)	16.0 (60.8)	12.1 (53.8)	5.2 (41.4)	1.0 (33.8)	−3.4 (25.9)	−3.4 (25.9)
Average precipitation mm (inches)	40.6 (1.60)	38.0 (1.50)	56.6 (2.23)	97.3 (3.83)	215.8 (8.50)	297.5 (11.71)	307.5 (12.11)	292.7 (11.52)	149.9 (5.90)	92.2 (3.63)	55.0 (2.17)	33.4 (1.31)	1,670.2 (65.76)
Average rainy days	11.7	12.5	14.5	14.7	16.2	18.7	20.2	18.6	12.3	9.8	8.5	7.7	165.2
Average relative humidity (%)	80.0	80.9	81.0	80.7	80.4	82.6	83.4	84.0	82.6	80.6	79.8	78.4	81.1
Mean monthly sunshine hours	62.2	67.1	66.5	100.4	140.3	131.5	152.3	174.8	161.3	139.8	121.2	109.8	1,426.2
Source: Vietnam Institute for Building Science and Technology
