= Longbang =

Longbang 龙邦镇
- Town
- Location in Guangxi
- Coordinates: 22°53′N 106°20′E
- Country: People's Republic of China
- Autonomous Region: Guangxi
- Prefecture-level city: Baise
- County-level city: Jingxi

Area
  - Town: 119 km^{2} (46 sq mi)

Population (2012)
  - Town: 20,378
  - Density: 171/km^{2} (444/sq mi)
  - Rural: 18,123
- Time zone: UTC+8 (China Standard)

Longbang (Chinese: 龙邦) is a town in Jingxi, Guangxi of China. As of 2018, it has 12 villages under its administration.

Most of its residents speak Zhuang dialects. Its main touristic sight are the Pogala underground defense works, an underground fortification built in 1892.

It is located near China's border with Vietnam, opposite the Trà Lĩnh District on the Vietnamese side.

== Border crossing ==
At the Longbang Border Crossing (龙邦口岸) (22°52′N 106°20′E) just south of town, Guangxi provincial highway 210 (S210) reaches the international border. There are also plans to extend the Tiandong-Debao rail line (a branch of the Nanning-Kunming Railway) to the Longbang border crossing.

According to a local travel guide site, there is a large market near the border crossing, where goods imported from Vietnam are sold.
