= Fusui County =

Fusui County 扶绥县 · Fuzsuih Yen
- County
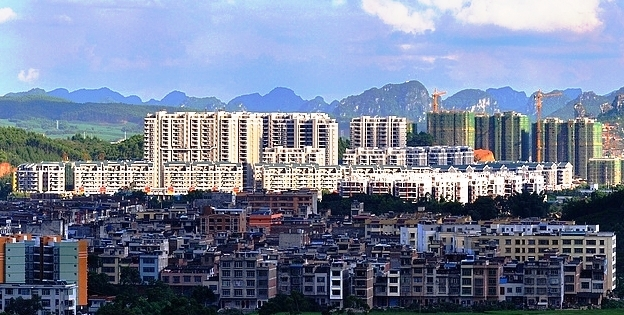
- The eponymous county seat of Fusui

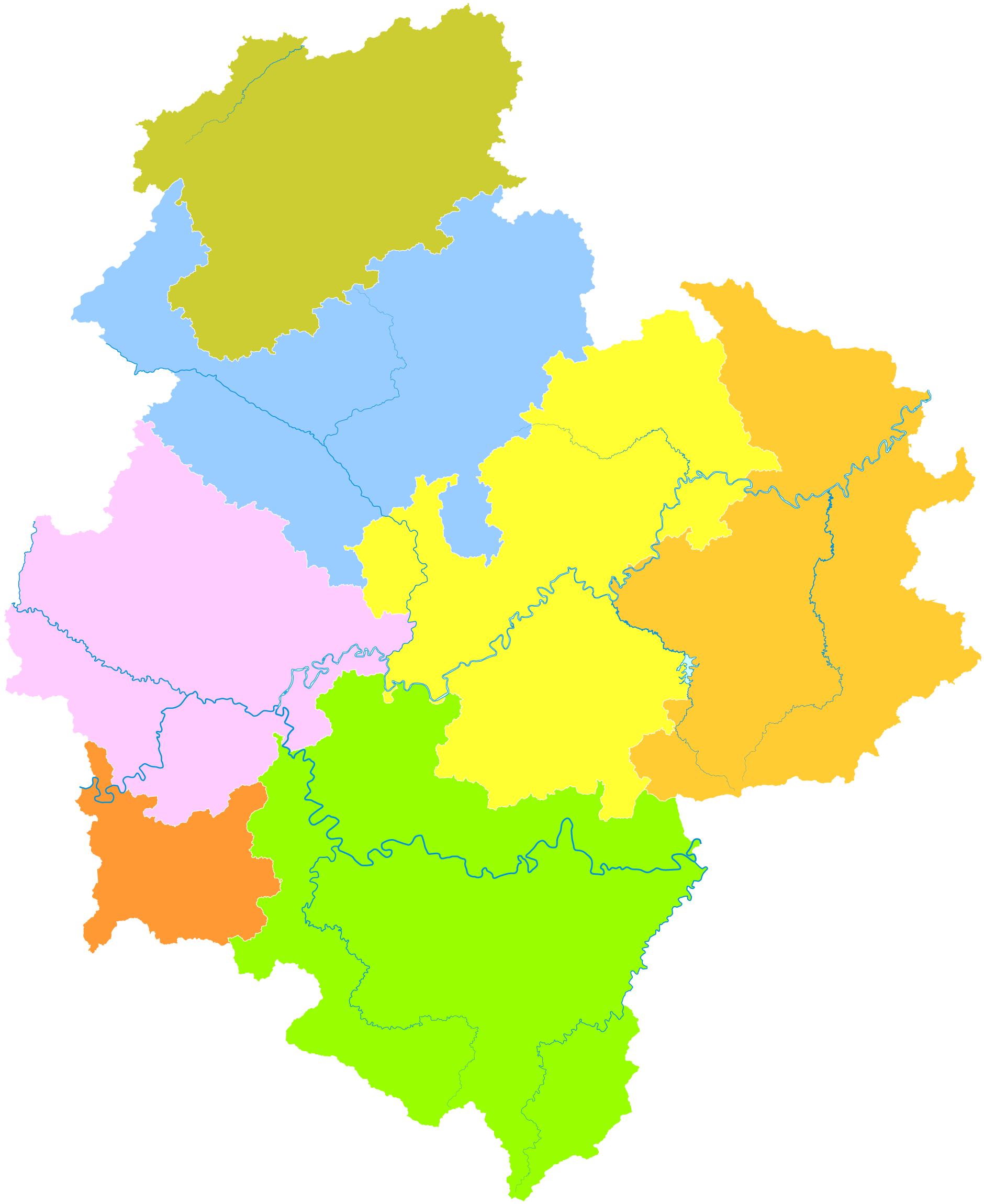
- Fusui is the easternmost division in this map of Chongzuo

- Chongzuo in Guangxi
- Coordinates: 22°38′06″N 107°54′15″E
- Country: China
- Autonomous region: Guangxi
- Prefecture-level city: Chongzuo
- Township-level divisions: 8 towns 3 townships
- County seat: Xinning (新宁镇)

Area
  - Total: 2,876 km^{2} (1,110 sq mi)
- Elevation: 94 m (308 ft)

Population (2020)
  - Total: 408,921
  - Density: 142.2/km^{2} (368.3/sq mi)
- Time zone: UTC+8 (China Standard)
- Postal code: 532200
- Website: https://web.archive.org/web/20110513115806/http://www.gxfs.gov.cn/

Fusui

Chinese name
- Traditional Chinese: 扶綏
- Simplified Chinese: 扶绥
Transcriptions
Standard Mandarin
- Hanyu Pinyin: Fúsuí
- Wade–Giles: Fu-sui

Zhuang name
- Zhuang: Fuzsuih

Fusui County is a county in the southwest of Guangxi, China. It is the easternmost county-level division of the prefecture-level city of Chongzuo.

== Geography ==
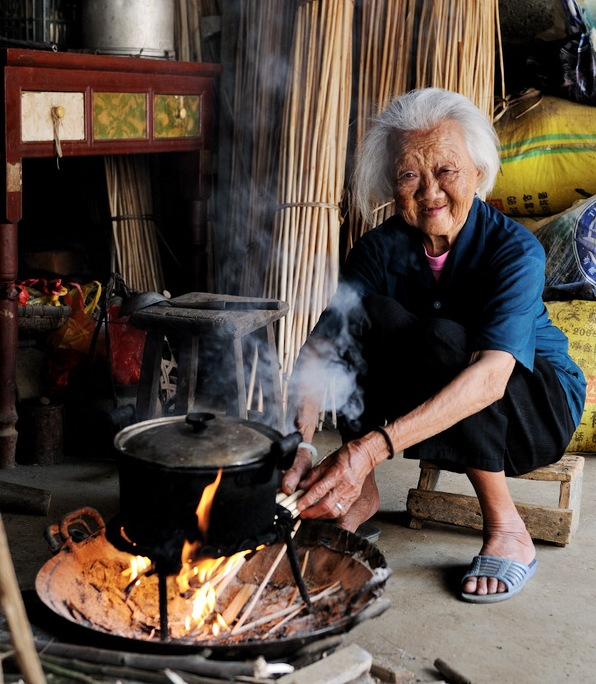
Zhuang's old woman (102 years old ) in Fusui

Fusui is located in southwestern Guangxi and in eastern Chongzuo City. It borders Qingxiu District of Nanning in the east, Shangsi County (Fangchenggang) and Ningming County in the south, Jiangzhou District (Chongzuo) in the west, and Long'an County (Nanning) in the north.

The city is located on the north bank of the Zuo River, offering a waterway to Nanning, whence it flows into the Xi River which provides access to Wuzhou and the Pearl River Delta, and is navigable by shallow-draft junks and motor launches, even though it is obstructed by rapids and sandbanks. Travelling upstream the Zuo River leads to Vietnam.

Fusui is situated in a hilly basin with elevations between 100–200 m (330–660 ft) above sea-level. Leiyantai Mountain dominates the southern part of town. Its area is 2,836 km^{2} (1,095 sq mi), 590 km^{2} (230 sq mi) of which is forested.

=== Flora and fauna ===
Fusui's warm climate gives it a large amount of biodiversity. There are many rare species of animals and more than 1,100 species of plants. National grade one protected animals include white-headed langurs, clouded leopards, musk deer, python more than 30 species. Country grade one protected plants include cycads, and country grade two protected plants include ferns, Jian wood, and camphor wood.

== Climate ==
Fusui's climate is humid, subtropical, and monsoon-influenced. Within the prefecture, the annual mean is 21.3–22.8 °C (70.3–73.0 °F). There are 346 frost-free days. Annual precipitation is between 1,050–1,300 millimetres (41–51 in).

Climate data for Fusui, elevation 146 m (479 ft), (1991−2020 normals, extremes 1991−present)
Month	Jan	Feb	Mar	Apr	May	Jun	Jul	Aug	Sep	Oct	Nov	Dec	Year
Record high °C (°F)	31.7 (89.1)	36.2 (97.2)	37.0 (98.6)	40.5 (104.9)	39.7 (103.5)	39.1 (102.4)	39.5 (103.1)	38.5 (101.3)	38.1 (100.6)	36.6 (97.9)	33.9 (93.0)	31.7 (89.1)	40.5 (104.9)
Mean daily maximum °C (°F)	17.5 (63.5)	19.9 (67.8)	22.6 (72.7)	28.2 (82.8)	31.5 (88.7)	32.9 (91.2)	33.4 (92.1)	33.2 (91.8)	32.0 (89.6)	28.9 (84.0)	24.8 (76.6)	19.9 (67.8)	27.1 (80.7)
Daily mean °C (°F)	13.5 (56.3)	15.5 (59.9)	18.5 (65.3)	23.4 (74.1)	26.6 (79.9)	28.2 (82.8)	28.6 (83.5)	28.4 (83.1)	27.1 (80.8)	24.0 (75.2)	19.7 (67.5)	15.2 (59.4)	22.4 (72.3)
Mean daily minimum °C (°F)	10.8 (51.4)	12.7 (54.9)	15.7 (60.3)	20.2 (68.4)	23.2 (73.8)	25.2 (77.4)	25.5 (77.9)	25.2 (77.4)	23.8 (74.8)	20.6 (69.1)	16.3 (61.3)	12.0 (53.6)	19.3 (66.7)
Record low °C (°F)	1.2 (34.2)	1.4 (34.5)	5.8 (42.4)	9.6 (49.3)	15.3 (59.5)	19.8 (67.6)	21.5 (70.7)	21.7 (71.1)	15.8 (60.4)	9.4 (48.9)	5.9 (42.6)	0.5 (32.9)	0.5 (32.9)
Average precipitation mm (inches)	37.6 (1.48)	26.9 (1.06)	51.4 (2.02)	68.9 (2.71)	146.5 (5.77)	200.0 (7.87)	208.4 (8.20)	188.1 (7.41)	121.3 (4.78)	62.8 (2.47)	46.9 (1.85)	29.9 (1.18)	1,188.7 (46.8)
Average precipitation days (≥ 0.1 mm)	9.8	9.4	12.9	10.7	15.0	17.5	17.4	15.7	10.7	6.4	6.5	6.7	138.7
Average relative humidity (%)	76	77	80	77	77	80	80	80	76	73	73	72	77
Mean monthly sunshine hours	66.6	66.7	59.7	106.0	156.4	154.9	181.3	189.0	180.4	164.2	132.8	109.9	1,567.9
Percentage possible sunshine	20	21	16	28	38	38	44	48	49	46	40	33	35
Source: China Meteorological Administrationall-time October record

== History ==
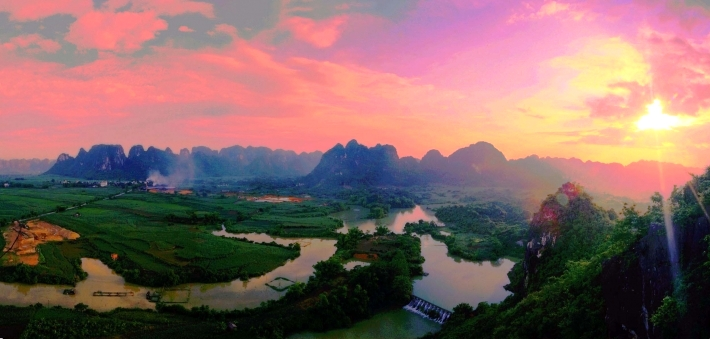
Zuo River scenery in Fusui

Fusui is one of the earliest centers of Zhuang culture. Important sites dating back to the Stone Age have been found here. The Rock Paintings of Hua Mountain along the Zuo River at Yinweng, Qixing, Hetou, Jiaobei, Tuotan, Xiatong, Xinwan, Balai Mountain date back 1800 to 2500 years and are one of the largest groups of pictographs in China and in the world. On several cliff faces there are hundreds of large red pictographs depicting a large battle. The red pigment is still bright and vivid and individual figures, weapons, and animals are easy to distinguish. The cliffs, part of the sacred Frog Mountain, were an important site to the early Zhuang.

A state seat called Longzhou was first established at the site in AD 638. The state government is located in today's Fusui Xinning town. This became the administrative seat of a commandery. In AD 771, the Longzhou commandery was dissolved, and the state was renamed Xiyuanzhou. In AD 1572, Xiyuanzhou commandery was dissolved, and the state was renamed Xinningzhou. In 1914, Xinningzhou was renamed Funan County, which could be regarded as the beginning of the county. In 1951, Funan, Tongzheng and Suilu County merged into Fusui County.

== Administrative divisions ==
Fusui County is divided into 8 towns and 3 townships: Xinning Town (新宁镇), Quli Town (渠黎镇), Qujiu Town (渠旧镇), Liuqiao Town (柳桥镇), Dongmen Town (东门镇), Shanxu Town (山圩镇), Zhongdong Town (中东镇), Dongluo Town (东罗镇), Longtou Township (龙头乡), Bapen Township (岜盆乡), Changping Township (昌平乡).

As of 2011, these town-level divisions are further divided into a total of 14 residential communities and 119 villages:

Towns and townships (11)	Villages (119)	Residential communities (14)	Population (2010 or 2011)
Xinning (新宁镇)	Chonghe (充禾村), Changsha (长沙村), Nakuan (那宽村), Shuibian (水边村), Tang'an (塘岸村), Shangdong (上洞村), Datang (大塘村), Quna (渠那村)	Chengxiang (城厢社区), Chengdong (城东社区), Chengxi (城西社区), Chengnan (城南社区), Xiufeng (秀峰社区)	85512
Quli (渠黎镇)	Liansui (联绥村), Quduo (渠哆村), Tuohe (驮河村), Xinan (新安村), Basang (岜桑村), Buyao (布尧村), Nale (那勒村), Nongping (弄平村), Qushi (渠莳村), Wangzhuang (汪庄村), Daling (大陵村), Leilong (蕾陇村), Dubang (笃邦村), Quxin (渠新村), Biji (必计村), Qufeng (渠凤村)	Quli (渠黎社区), China-ASEAN Youth Industrial Park (中国东盟青年产业园社区)	48195
Qujiu (渠旧镇)	Lailu (濑滤村), Tuonong (驮弄村), Tuoya (驮迓村), Sanhe (三合村), Nongbu (弄卜村), Qutun (渠吞村), Zhongyuan (中原村), Zhuqin (竹琴村), Chongbian (崇边村), Busha (布沙村)	Qujiu (渠旧社区)	28000
Liuqiao (柳桥镇)	Leida (雷大村), Shangtun (上屯村), Baliu (岜留村), Zaowa (灶瓦村), Xincun (新村村), Quqi ( 渠齐村), Xichangn (西长村), Fuba (扶岜村), Poli (坡利村), Pokan (坡龛村), Pingpo (平坡村), Najia (那加村)	Liuqiao (柳桥社区)	33000
Dongmen (东门镇)	Banbao (板包村), Baidang (佰党村), Haozuo (郝佐村), Liutou (六头村), Balou (岜楼村), Qurong ( 渠荣村), Bulian ( 布练村), Jiucheng (旧城村), Zìyao (自尧村), Buge (卜葛村), Najiang (那江村), Naba (那巴村), Jiangbian ( 江边村), Lingnan ( 岭南村), Tuoda ( 驮达村)	Dongmen (东门社区)	44000
Shanxu (山圩镇)	Qutou (渠透村), Nali (那利村), Bayin (坝引村), Kunlun (昆仑村), Pingtian (平天村), Napai (那派村), Pinggao (平搞村), Na bai (那白村), Yubai (玉柏村), Jiuta (九塔村), Naren (那任村)	Shanxu (山圩社区)	38000
Zhongdong (中东镇)	Xinling (新灵村), Pingshan (瓶山村), Jiuxian (旧县村), Fengpo (丰坡村), Jiuhe (九和村), Sitong (思同村), Xinlong (新隆村), Baiyu, (百域村) Shangyu (上余村), Sanshao (三哨村), Dongshao (东哨村), Linhe (淋和村), Sixin (四新村), Weijiu (维旧村)	Zhongdong (中东社区)	38000
Dongluo (东罗镇)	Dongluo (东罗村), Kelan (客兰村), Douchong (都充村), Nalian (那练村), Cenfan (岑凡村), Qukan (渠坎村), Bayang (岜羊村), Dongdou (东斗村), Houzhai (厚寨村)		41000
Longtou Township (龙头乡)	Tengguang (滕广村), Jiuzhuang (旧庄村), Fengzhuang (凤庄村), Xiaohan ( 肖汉村), Natang (那塘村), Tanlong (坛龙村), Nagui (那贵村), Linwang (林旺村)	Longtou (龙头社区)	32000
Bapen Township (岜盆乡)	Napo (那坡村), Gudou (姑豆村), Nabiao (弄廪村), Balun (岜伦村), Nongdong (弄洞村), Tuoliao (驮辽村), Nabiao (那标村), Bapen (岜盆村),		27552
Changping Township (昌平乡)	Sairen (赛仁村), Mumin (木民村), Pingbai (平白村), Balian (八联村), Lianhao (联豪村), Sihe (四和村), Shili (石丽村), Zhonghua (中华村)	Changping (昌平社区)	25054

== Demographics ==
Fusui's population was 440,000 (2011). 82.8% of the people belong to the Zhuang ethnic group. The rest include Han, Yao, and other ethnic groups.

== Economy ==
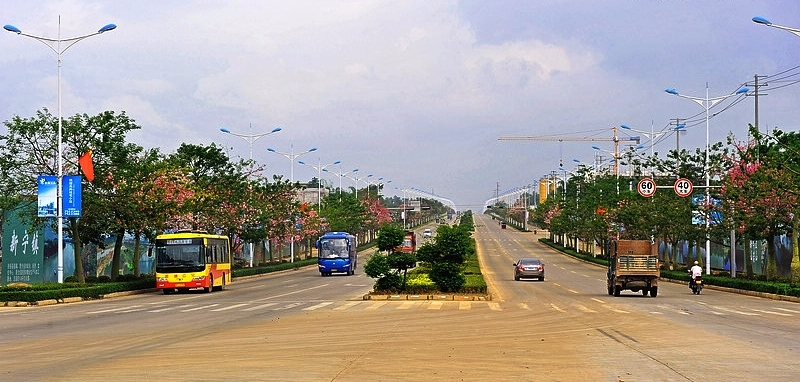
Fusui Avenue

Formerly an impoverished county, Fusui from 1992 experienced agricultural growth. The county is surrounded by a fertile agricultural region producing subtropical fruits and sugarcane; food processing, flour milling, sugar refining, meatpacking, and cane sugar manufacture are important in the county. Fusui has been a center for cane sugar, sisal and cement manufacture, and it is also famous for traveling. According to statistics issued by the Fusui government in 2011, the county's GDP was 101 billion yuan. Forestry and agriculture are two of Fusui's biggest industries. Rice, beans, oranges, corn, cassava, cinnamon, bananas, vegetables, durian, pineapples, longan, and tea are all major crops, but sugarcane and sisal are the center of Fusui agriculture. Farm raised animals include beef and dairy cattle, sheep, ducks, chickens, geese, bees, turtles, snakes, and pigeons. Aquaculture for fish is also significant. Chinese medicinal herbs are picked from the wild and also grown. Important mineral resources include manganese, gold, ferberite, coal, iron, aluminium, zinc, cobalt, nickel, calcite, limestone, barite, crystal, marble, and mercuric sulfide. It is China's biggest sugarcane and sisal producer base. Cement and building materials are the center of Fusui industry. Other industries include export infrastructure, paper, forest products such as timber and turpentine, and pharmaceuticals.

Among the important companies based in Fusui are:

- Fusui Dongmen Nanhua Sugar Industry Corp
- Fusui Funan East Asia sugar industrial Corp
- Conch Group Fusui Xinning Conch Cement Corp
- Funan East Asia sugar industrial Corp
- Shanxu Sisal Processing Corp
- Fusui Fuyuan Sisal Corp

== Culture ==
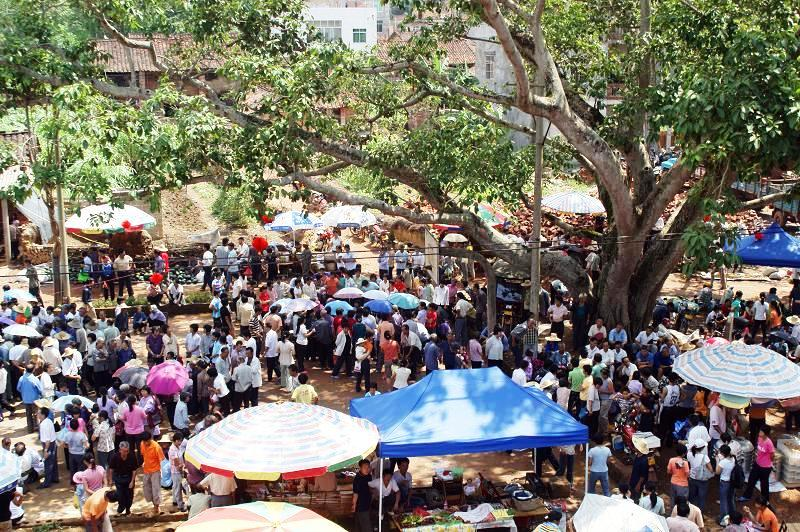
Zhuang's song Fair in Liuqiao town of the Fusui

According to the official Zuo River's Daily newspaper, Zhuang is the first language for 82% of the 440,000 residents of the Fusui, while the other 10% speak mainly Southwestern Mandarin. Other languages such as Iu Mien language are spoken in significant numbers as well.

In Fusu, Zhuang's characteristics on dresses remain on their own, the colors of which are principally conventional navy blue.(commonly known as “blue clothing Zhuang”) Zhuang's men and the women cover their heads with a black or blue scarf. Some women substitute this scarf by a turban that can adopt different forms. They also decorate their shirts with decorations made out of silver.

In Fusui, Zhuang people celebrate festivals such as “Ancestor worship festival in spring” (2 February-Chinese calendar's agrarian calendar), “Tomb sweeping festival” and “Song Festival” (3 March - Chinese calendar's agrarian calendar), “Wheat heat Festival” (also called “Buddha Bath”or “Bovine soul Festival”, 8 April-Chinese calendar's agrarian calendar), “Ghost festival” (14 July - Chinese calendar's agrarian calendar), “Ancestor worship festival in autumn” (8 August -Chinese calendar's agrarian calendar), “bumper harvest festival” (also called “Ten intofestival”or “Nine into festival”, October - Chinese calendar's agrarian calendar).

In addition, Zhuang opera and Cuisine festival are wealthy local characteristics of folk culture.

== Famous people born in Fusui ==
- Wu Lingyun (？- 1863)- a Zhuang's hero in Qing dynasty, Zhuang
- Huang Xianfan (1899–1982) - a Chinese historian, ethnologist and educator, Zhuang
