= Daxin County =

Daxin County 大新县 · Dasinh Yen
- County
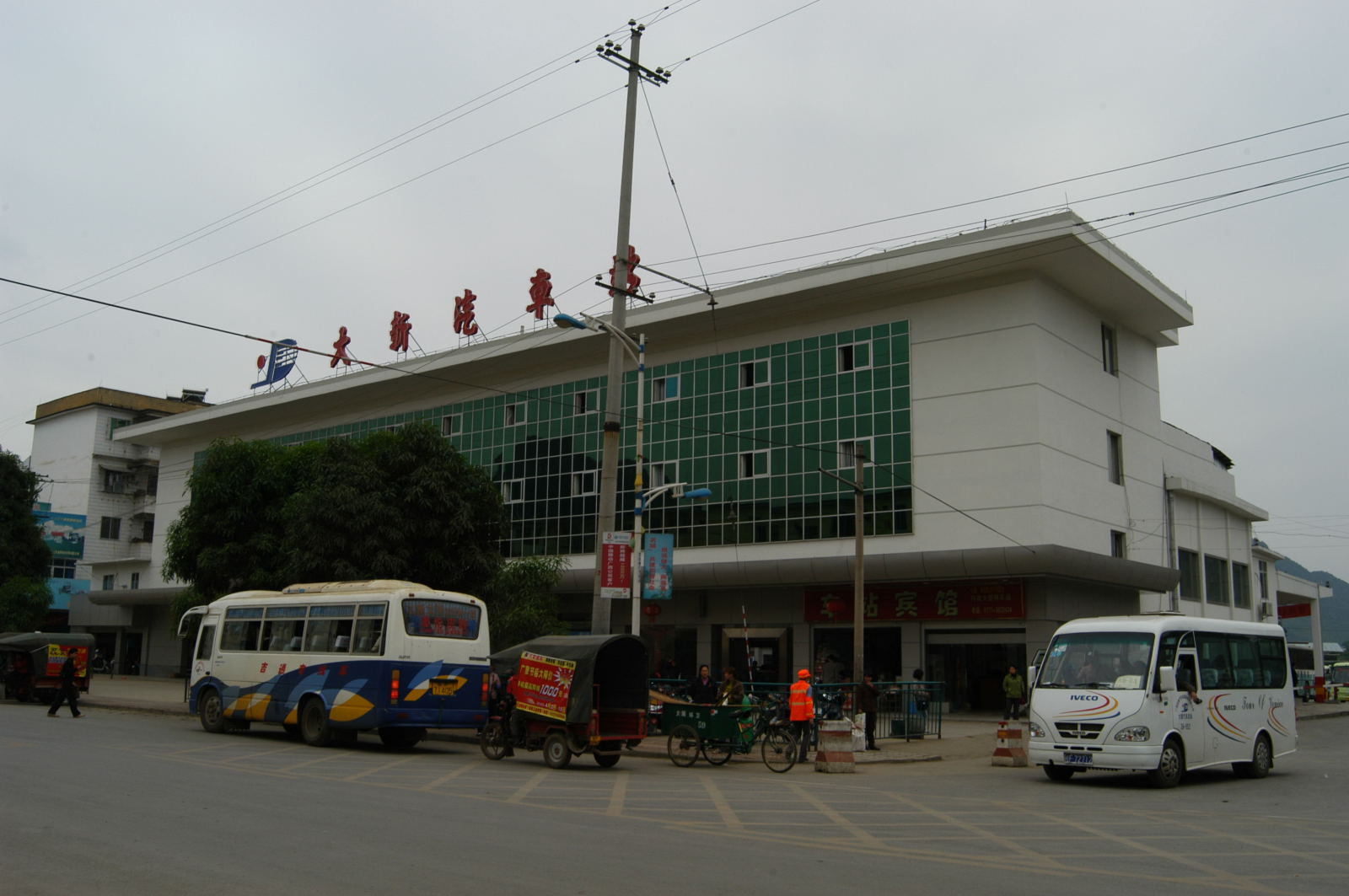
- Daxin County bus terminal

- Location of the seat in Guangxi
- Coordinates: 22°50′10″N 107°11′59″E
- Country: China
- Autonomous region: Guangxi
- Prefecture-level city: Chongzuo
- County seat: Taocheng

Area
  - Total: 2,756 km^{2} (1,064 sq mi)

Population (2020)
  - Total: 282,563
  - Density: 102.5/km^{2} (265.5/sq mi)
- Time zone: UTC+8 (China Standard)
- Website: www.daxin.gov.cn

Daxin County (simplified Chinese: 大新县; traditional Chinese: 大新縣; pinyin: Dàxīn Xiàn, Zhuang: Dasinh Yen) is a county in the west of Guangxi Zhuang Autonomous Region, China. It is under the administration of Chongzuo city.

The southwest border of Daxin County is along Cao Bằng Province, Vietnam. The legal description is mainly determined for a part of its length by the midline of the watercourse along the Guichun River and its Detian Falls.

== Administrative divisions ==
Daxin County is divided into 5 towns and 9 townships:

towns

- Taocheng 桃城镇
- Quanming 全茗镇
- Leiping 雷平镇
- Shuolong 硕龙镇
- Xialei 下雷镇

townships

- Wushan 五山乡
- Longmen 龙门乡
- Changming 昌明乡
- Fulong 福隆乡
- Naling 那岭乡
- Encheng 恩城乡
- Lanwei 榄圩乡
- Baoxu 宝圩乡
- Kanxu 堪圩乡

== Climate ==
Climate data for Daxin, elevation 278 m (912 ft), (1991−2020 normals, extremes 1981–present)
Month	Jan	Feb	Mar	Apr	May	Jun	Jul	Aug	Sep	Oct	Nov	Dec	Year
Record high °C (°F)	29.7 (85.5)	35.3 (95.5)	35.6 (96.1)	38.5 (101.3)	39.0 (102.2)	38.0 (100.4)	37.9 (100.2)	39.3 (102.7)	37.2 (99.0)	35.3 (95.5)	32.4 (90.3)	30.0 (86.0)	39.3 (102.7)
Mean daily maximum °C (°F)	17.3 (63.1)	19.6 (67.3)	22.3 (72.1)	27.5 (81.5)	30.9 (87.6)	32.2 (90.0)	32.6 (90.7)	32.6 (90.7)	31.4 (88.5)	28.4 (83.1)	24.5 (76.1)	19.9 (67.8)	26.6 (79.9)
Daily mean °C (°F)	13.4 (56.1)	15.5 (59.9)	18.4 (65.1)	23.1 (73.6)	26.2 (79.2)	27.6 (81.7)	27.8 (82.0)	27.6 (81.7)	26.2 (79.2)	23.2 (73.8)	19.2 (66.6)	14.9 (58.8)	21.9 (71.5)
Mean daily minimum °C (°F)	10.8 (51.4)	12.8 (55.0)	15.9 (60.6)	20.1 (68.2)	22.8 (73.0)	24.6 (76.3)	24.8 (76.6)	24.4 (75.9)	22.8 (73.0)	19.7 (67.5)	15.7 (60.3)	11.6 (52.9)	18.8 (65.9)
Record low °C (°F)	0.8 (33.4)	1.6 (34.9)	2.6 (36.7)	9.4 (48.9)	13.3 (55.9)	16.3 (61.3)	19.5 (67.1)	21.6 (70.9)	15.7 (60.3)	9.6 (49.3)	3.9 (39.0)	−0.3 (31.5)	−0.3 (31.5)
Average precipitation mm (inches)	43.6 (1.72)	29.8 (1.17)	57.9 (2.28)	75.4 (2.97)	156.7 (6.17)	243.2 (9.57)	257.1 (10.12)	218.4 (8.60)	115.0 (4.53)	68.3 (2.69)	46.3 (1.82)	34.2 (1.35)	1,345.9 (52.99)
Average precipitation days (≥ 0.1 mm)	12.2	11.4	15.9	13.6	15.1	18.4	19.1	16.8	11.3	7.9	8.2	8.2	158.1
Average relative humidity (%)	76	76	79	77	76	81	81	80	78	74	74	73	77
Mean monthly sunshine hours	60.0	61.6	54.1	95.8	146.2	147.7	176.5	187.8	173.0	151.1	128.9	110.1	1,492.8
Percentage possible sunshine	18	19	14	25	36	37	43	47	47	42	39	33	33
Source: China Meteorological Administration all-time October record

== See also ==
- Ban Gioc – Detian Falls
- Daxin: Stealthy Backdoor Designed for Attacks Against Hardened Networks
