= 江州 =

江州 may refer to:

- Jiangzhou District (江州区), Chongzuo, Guangxi
  - Jiangzhou Town (江州镇), town in Jiangzhou District
- Jiangzhou Prefecture, a prefecture in modern Jiangxi, China between the 6th and 14th centuries
- Ōmi Province, abbreviated name was Gōshū (江州), province of Japan located in what is today Shiga Prefecture
