= Shangshi =

Shangshi may refer to:

- Shangshi, Guangxi, town of Pingxiang, Guangxi, China
- Shangshi, Hubei, town of Sui County, Hubei, China
- Royal Feast (尚食; Shàngshí), 2022 Chinese television series
