= Qujiu =

Qujiu 渠旧镇
- Town
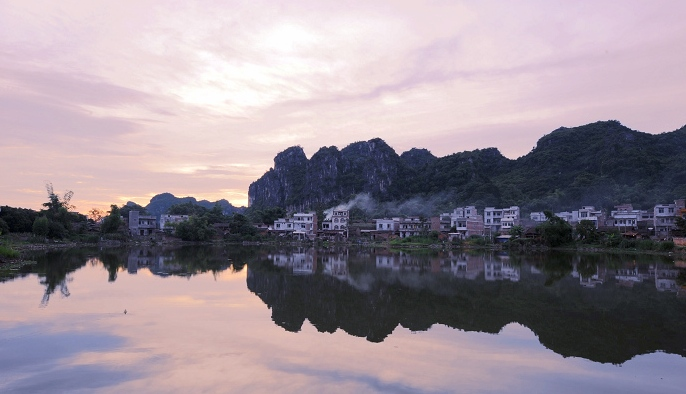
- Qujiu scenery
- Interactive map of Qujiu
- Coordinates: 22°31′02″N 107°34′10″E
- Country: People's Republic of China
- Region: Guangxi
- Prefecture-level city: Chongzuo
- County: Fusui
- Village-level divisions: 2 residential communities 16 villages

Area
  - Total: 174.35 km^{2} (67.32 sq mi)

Population (2011)
  - Total: 28,000
  - Density: 160/km^{2} (420/sq mi)
- Time zone: UTC+8 (China Standard)
- Postal code: 532105

Qujiu (simplified Chinese: 渠旧镇; traditional Chinese: 渠舊鎮; pinyin: Qújiù Zhèn; zhuang: Gizgiu Cin) is a town under the administration of Fusui County in southern Guangxi Zhuang Autonomous Region, China. As of 2011, it had an area of 174.35 square kilometres (67.32 sq mi) populated by 28,000 people residing in 1 residential communities (社区) and 10 villages.

== Administrative divisions ==
There are 1 residential communities and 10 villages:

Residential communities:

- Qujiu (渠旧社区)

Villages:

- Lailu (濑滤村), Tuonong (驮弄村), Tuoya (驮迓村), Sanhe (三合村), Nongbu (弄卜村), Qutun (渠吞村), Zhongyuan (中原村), Zhuqin (竹琴村), Chongbian (崇边村), Busha (布沙村)

== See also ==
- List of township-level divisions of Guangxi
