= Zuojiang Huashan Rock Art =

Zuojiang Huashan Rock Art Cultural Landscape
UNESCO World Heritage Site
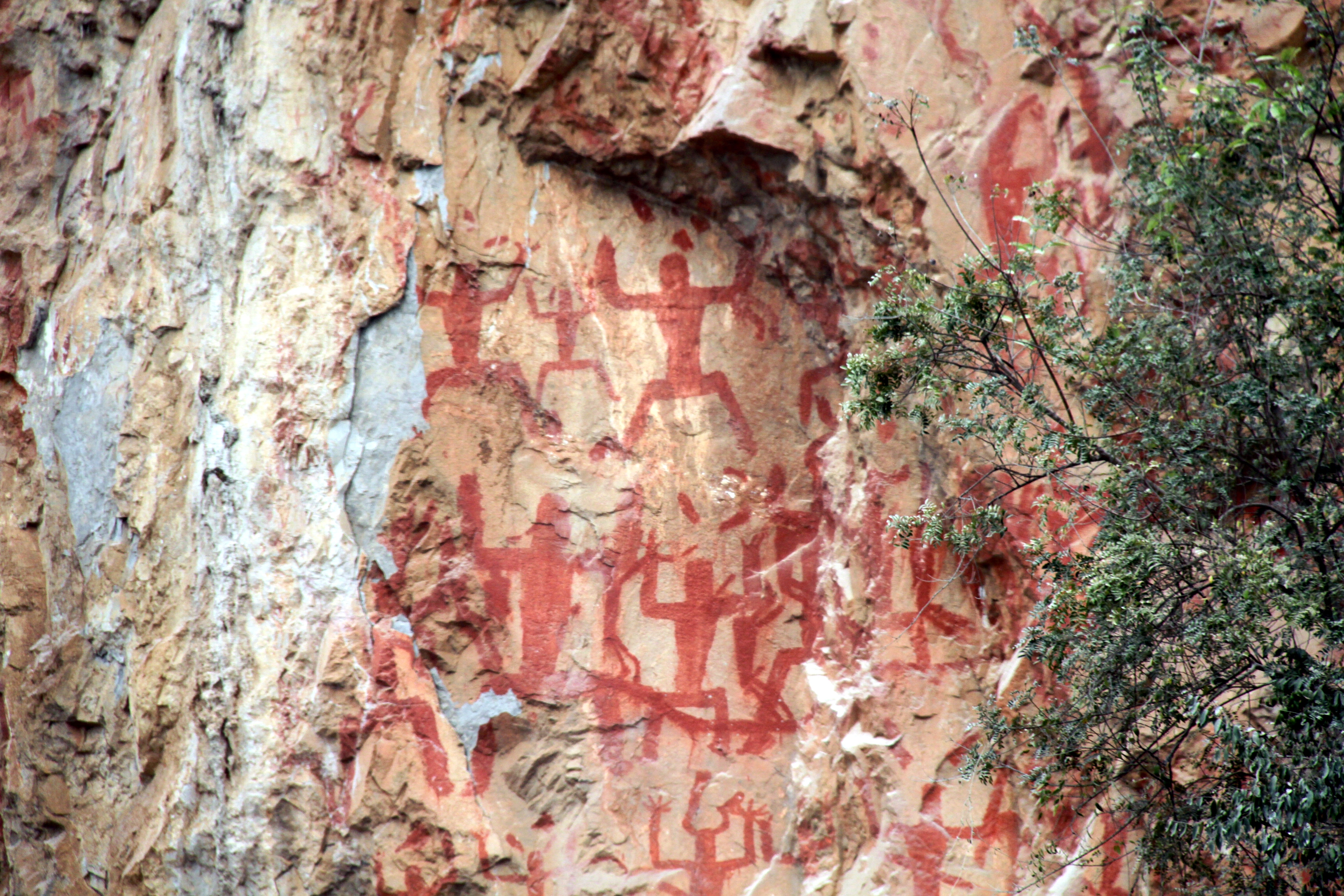
- Detail of the main painting

- Location within Guangxi Location within China
- Location: Guangxi, China
- Includes: 1. Ningming and Longzhou County rock art 2. Longhzou County rock art 3. Jiangzhou District, Fusui County rock art
- Criteria: Cultural: (iii), (vi)
- Reference: 1508
- Inscription: 2016 (40th Session)
- Area: 6,621.6 ha (16,362 acres)
- Buffer zone: 12,149.0 ha (30,021 acres)
- Coordinates: 22°15′20″N 107°1′23″E

The Zuojiang Huashan Rock Art Cultural Landscape (Chinese: 花山壁画; pinyin: Huāshān Bìhuà) is an extensive assembly of historical rock art that was painted on limestone cliff faces in Guangxi, southern China. The paintings are located on the west bank of the Ming River (Guangxi) which is a tributary of the Zuo River. The area of the paintings is part of the Nonggang Nature Reserve and belongs to Ningming County. On July 15, 2016, Zuojiang Huashan Rock Art Cultural Landscape was listed as the 49th UNESCO World Heritage Site in China.

The main painted area along the cliff has a width of about 170 metres (560 ft) and a height of about 40 metres (130 ft) and is one of the largest rock paintings in China. The paintings are located between 30 metres (98 ft) and 90 metres (300 ft) above the river's water level. The main area contains about 1900 discrete countable images arranged in about 110 groups. The paintings have a red color and were executed using a mixture of red ochre (hematite), animal glue, and blood. They depict human figures as well as animals along with bronze drums, knives, swords, bells, and ships. Human figures are typically between 60 centimetres (24 in) and 150 centimetres (4.9 ft) tall, but one figure reaches 3 metres (9.8 ft) in height.

The paintings are believed to be between 1800 and 2500 or between 1600 and 2400 years old. The period of their creations hence spans the times from the Warring States period to the late Han dynasty in the history of China. Many of the paintings are thought to "illustrate the life and rituals" of the ancient Luo Yue people, who inhabited the valley of Zuo River during this period and are believed to be ancestors of Zhuang people, Muong people and Kinh people.

An exhibition in the Zhuang Nationality Museum in the City of Chongzuo (崇左市壮族博物馆) is dedicated to the history and interpretation of the paintings.
