= Bapen =

Bapen may be,

- Bapen Township, China
- Bapen language, Senegal
