= Quli, Guangxi =

Quli 渠黎镇
- Town
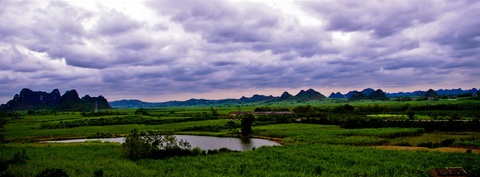
- Rural scenery in Quli Town
- Interactive map of Quli
- Coordinates: 22°33′54″N 107°48′08″E
- Country: People's Republic of China
- Region: Guangxi
- Prefecture-level city: Chongzuo
- County: Fusui
- Village-level divisions: 2 residential communities 16 villages

Area
  - Total: 382.21 km^{2} (147.57 sq mi)

Population (2011)
  - Total: 48,195
  - Density: 126.10/km^{2} (326.59/sq mi)
- Time zone: UTC+8 (China Standard)
- Postal code: 532103

Quli (simplified Chinese: 渠黎镇; traditional Chinese: 渠黎鎮; pinyin: Qúlí Zhèn; zhuang: Gizlij Cin) is a town under the administration of Fusui County in southern Guangxi Zhuang Autonomous Region, China. As of 2011, it had an area of 382.21 square kilometres (147.57 sq mi) populated by 48,195 people residing in 2 residential communities (社区) and 16 villages.

== Administrative divisions ==
There are 2 residential communities and 16 villages:

Residential communities:

- Quli (渠黎社区), China-ASEAN Youth Industrial Park (中国东盟青年产业园社区)

Villages:

- Liansui (联绥村), Quduo (渠哆村), Tuohe (驮河村), Xinan (新安村), Basang (岜桑村), Buyao (布尧村), Nale (那勒村), Nongping (弄平村), Qushi (渠莳村), Wangzhuang (汪庄村), Daling (大陵村), Leilong (蕾陇村), Dubang (笃邦村), Quxin (渠新村), Biji (必计村), Qufeng (渠凤村)

== See also ==
- List of township-level divisions of Guangxi
