= Pingxiang, Guangxi =

Pingxiang 凭祥市 · Bingzsiengz Si
- County-level city
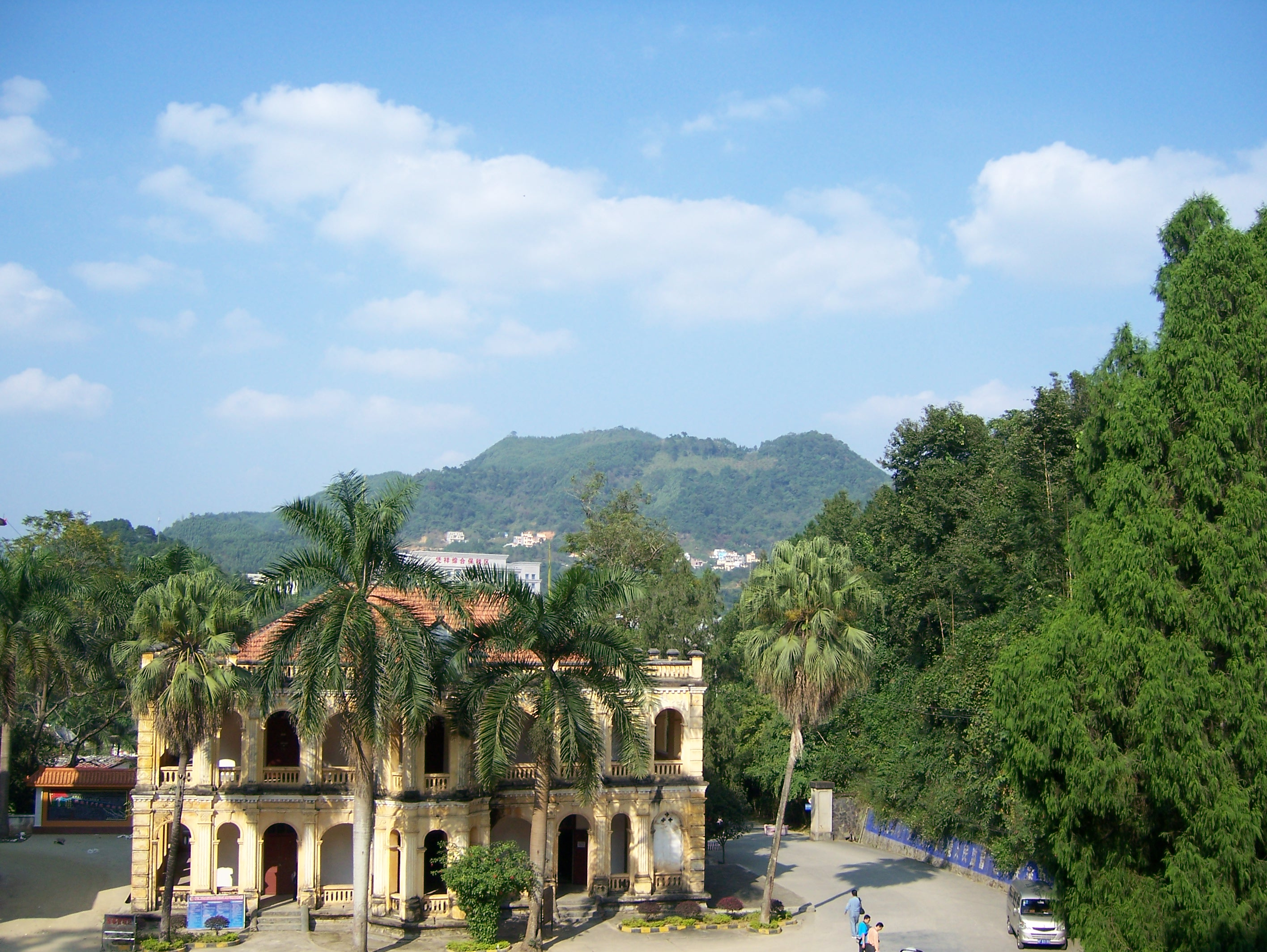

- Location in Guangxi
- Coordinates: 22°05′38″N 106°45′58″E
- Country: China
- Province: Guangxi
- Prefecture-level city: Chongzuo
- Municipal seat: Pingxiang

Area
  - Total: 650 km^{2} (250 sq mi)

Population (2020)
  - Total: 129,843
  - Density: 200/km^{2} (520/sq mi)
- Time zone: UTC+8 (China Standard)

Pingxiang, Guangxi

Chinese name
- Simplified Chinese: 凭祥市
- Traditional Chinese: 憑祥市
Transcriptions
Standard Mandarin
- Hanyu Pinyin: Píngxiáng Shì
Yue: Cantonese
- Jyutping: pang4 coeng4 si5

Vietnamese name
- Vietnamese: Thị xã Bằng Tường / Bằng Tường thị
- Hán-Nôm: 市社憑祥/憑祥市

Zhuang name
- Zhuang: Bingzsiengz Si
- 1957 orthography: Biŋƨsieŋƨ Si

Pingxiang (凭祥市) is a county-level city under the administration of the prefecture-level city of Chongzuo, in the southwest of the Guangxi Zhuang Autonomous Region, China.

== Situation ==
The city covers an area of 650 km^{2} (250 sq mi). It is bordered in the north by Longzhou County and in the east by Ningming County, both in Chongzuo, and in the south and west by Vietnam's Lạng Sơn Province.

National Route 322 comes through the city centre, as does the railway which continues on to Hanoi; a high-speed expressway, now also international, passes nearby.

Zhennan Pass, site of the Battle of Bang Bo during the Sino-French War, is now named the "Friendship Pass" and is considered the gateway to Vietnam.

There are also plans to build a high-speed railway from Nanning to the Vietnamese border.

== Demographics ==
Pingxiang has a population of approximately 106,400 (83.5% of the people belong to the Zhuang ethnic group, 2010). Ethnic groups include Zhuang, Han, Yao, Miao, Jing, and others.

== Administrative divisions ==
Pingxiang is divided into 4 towns:

- Pingxiang (凭祥镇)
- Shangshi (上石镇)
- Xiashi (夏石镇)
- Youyi (友谊镇)

== Transportation ==
=== Rail ===
- Hunan–Guangxi Railway

== Climate ==
Climate data for Pingxiang, elevation 243 m (797 ft), (1991–2020 normals, extremes 1981–2010)
Month	Jan	Feb	Mar	Apr	May	Jun	Jul	Aug	Sep	Oct	Nov	Dec	Year
Record high °C (°F)	30.2 (86.4)	36.1 (97.0)	35.4 (95.7)	38.6 (101.5)	40.0 (104.0)	37.7 (99.9)	37.8 (100.0)	37.1 (98.8)	36.7 (98.1)	34.6 (94.3)	33.4 (92.1)	30.8 (87.4)	40.0 (104.0)
Mean daily maximum °C (°F)	17.6 (63.7)	19.8 (67.6)	22.3 (72.1)	27.6 (81.7)	31.1 (88.0)	32.5 (90.5)	32.8 (91.0)	32.5 (90.5)	31.3 (88.3)	28.7 (83.7)	24.9 (76.8)	20.4 (68.7)	26.8 (80.2)
Daily mean °C (°F)	13.5 (56.3)	15.8 (60.4)	18.6 (65.5)	23.2 (73.8)	26.3 (79.3)	27.8 (82.0)	28.0 (82.4)	27.4 (81.3)	26.0 (78.8)	23.2 (73.8)	19.2 (66.6)	15.1 (59.2)	22.0 (71.6)
Mean daily minimum °C (°F)	10.7 (51.3)	13.0 (55.4)	16.0 (60.8)	20.2 (68.4)	22.9 (73.2)	24.6 (76.3)	24.8 (76.6)	24.3 (75.7)	22.8 (73.0)	19.8 (67.6)	15.6 (60.1)	11.7 (53.1)	18.9 (66.0)
Record low °C (°F)	1.2 (34.2)	2.6 (36.7)	3.3 (37.9)	9.6 (49.3)	14.1 (57.4)	15.5 (59.9)	19.1 (66.4)	21.6 (70.9)	15.5 (59.9)	9.1 (48.4)	3.5 (38.3)	0.1 (32.2)	0.1 (32.2)
Average precipitation mm (inches)	33.9 (1.33)	30.0 (1.18)	57.7 (2.27)	83.0 (3.27)	156.0 (6.14)	201.5 (7.93)	223.4 (8.80)	239.6 (9.43)	132.9 (5.23)	59.3 (2.33)	44.2 (1.74)	28.5 (1.12)	1,290 (50.77)
Average precipitation days (≥ 0.1 mm)	11.7	11.9	15.1	12.7	14.0	17.3	17.0	17.6	11.5	7.2	6.5	7.5	150
Average relative humidity (%)	80	82	82	80	78	80	80	82	81	80	79	77	80
Mean monthly sunshine hours	66.1	60.4	51.3	88.9	146.9	146.6	172.6	169.0	166.8	154.5	134.9	111.0	1,469
Percentage possible sunshine	20	19	14	23	36	36	42	43	46	43	41	33	33
Source: China Meteorological Administration

== See also ==
- Lang Son
