= Xinning, Guangxi =

Xinning 新宁镇
- Town
- Interactive map of Xinning
- Coordinates: 22°37′57″N 107°54′17″E
- Country: People's Republic of China
- Region: Guangxi
- Prefecture-level city: Chongzuo
- County: Fusui
- Village-level divisions: 5 residential communities 8 villages

Area
  - Total: 111.8 km^{2} (43.2 sq mi)
- Elevation: 90 m (300 ft)

Population (2011)
  - Total: 85,512
  - Density: 764.9/km^{2} (1,981/sq mi)
- Time zone: UTC+8 (China Standard)
- Postal code: 532200

Xinning
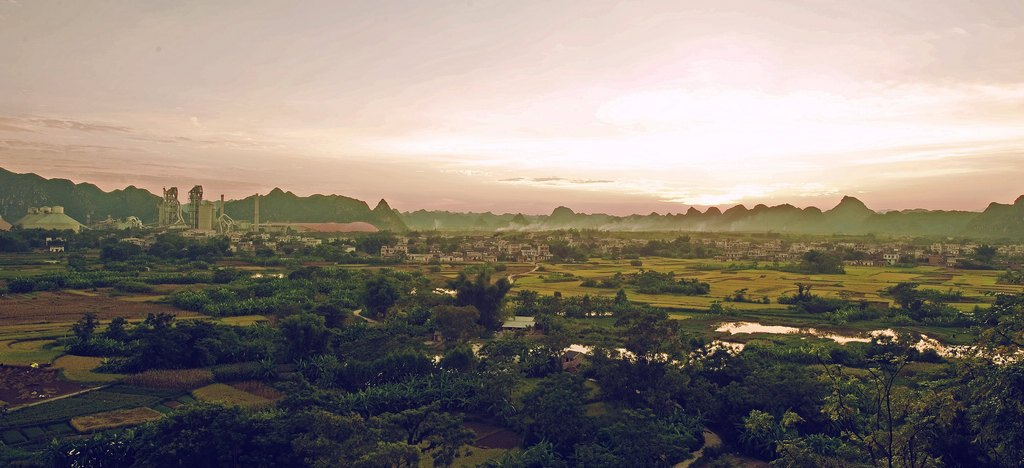

Chinese name
- Traditional Chinese: 新寧
- Simplified Chinese: 新宁
- Literal meaning: Newly Pacified
Transcriptions
Standard Mandarin
- Hanyu Pinyin: Xīnníng

Zhuang name
- Zhuang: Sinzningz Cin

Xinning is a town in Fusui County in southern Guangxi, China. As of 2011, it had an area of 111.8 square kilometers (43.2 sq mi) populated by an estimated 85,512 people residing in 5 residential communities and 8 villages.

== Administrative divisions ==
There are 5 residential communities and 8 villages:

Residential communities:

- Chengxiang (城厢社区), Chengdong (城东社区), Chengxi (城西社区), Chengnan (城南社区), Xiufeng (秀峰社区)

Villages:

- Chonghe (充禾村), Changsha (长沙村), Nakuan (那宽村), Shuibian (水边村), Tangan (塘岸村), Shangdong (上洞村), Datang (大塘村), Quna (渠那村)

== See also ==
- List of township-level divisions of Guangxi
- Other Xinnings, particularly the more famous former Xinning in Guangdong, now Taishan
