= Changping Township, Fusui County =

Changping 昌平乡
- Township
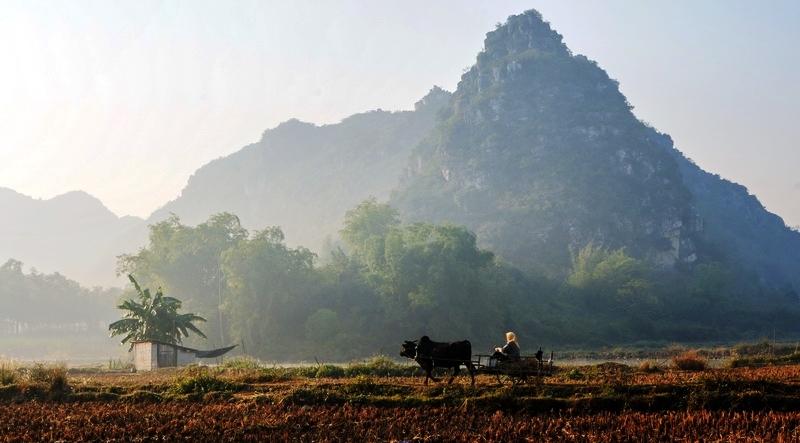
- Changping scenery
- Interactive map of Changping
- Coordinates: 22°42′33″N 107°53′47″E
- Country: People's Republic of China
- Region: Guangxi
- Prefecture-level city: Chongzuo
- County: Fusui
- Village-level divisions: 1 residential communities 8 villages

Area
  - Total: 196 km^{2} (76 sq mi)

Population (2011)
  - Total: 25,054
  - Density: 128/km^{2} (331/sq mi)
- Time zone: UTC+8 (China Standard)
- Postal code: 532101

Changping (simplified Chinese: 昌平乡; traditional Chinese: 昌平鄉; pinyin: Chāngpíng Xiāng; zhuang: Canghbingz Yangh) is a Township under the administration of Fusui County in southern Guangxi Zhuang Autonomous Region, China. As of 2011, it had an area of 196 square kilometres (76 sq mi) populated by 25,054 people residing in 1 residential communities (社区) and 8 villages.

== Administrative divisions ==
There are 1 residential communities and 8 villages:

Residential communities:

- Changping (昌平社区)

Villages:

- Sairen (赛仁村), Mumin (木民村), Pingbai (平白村), Balian (八联村), Lianhao (联豪村), Sihe (四和村), Shili (石丽村), Zhonghua (中华村)

== See also ==
- List of township-level divisions of Guangxi
