= Zhongdong =

Zhongdong may refer to several locations in China:

- Zhongdong, Guangxi, a town in Fusui County, Guangxi Zhuang Autonomous Region
- Zhongdong, Jinta County (中东镇), town in Jinta County, Gansu
- Zhongdong, Ziyun County (中洞), village in Guizhou renowned as the last cave settlement in China
