= Shanxu =

Shanxu 山圩镇
- Town
- Interactive map of Shanxu
- Coordinates: 22°27′05″N 107°59′04″E
- Country: People's Republic of China
- Region: Guangxi
- Prefecture-level city: Chongzuo
- County: Fusui
- Village-level divisions: 1 residential communities 11 villages

Area
  - Total: 283 km^{2} (109 sq mi)

Population (2011)
  - Total: 38,000
  - Density: 130/km^{2} (350/sq mi)
- Time zone: UTC+8 (China Standard)
- Postal code: 532112

Shanxu (Chinese: 山圩镇; pinyin: Shānxū Zhèn; Zhuang: Sanhih Cin) is a town under the administration of Fusui County in southern Guangxi Zhuang Autonomous Region, China. As of 2011, it had an area of 283 square kilometres (109 sq mi) populated by 38,000 people residing in 1 residential communities (社区) and 11 villages.

== Administrative divisions ==
There are 1 residential communities and 11 villages:

Residential communities:

- Shanxu (山圩社区)

Villages:

- Qutou (渠透村), Nali (那利村), Bayin (坝引村), Kunlun (昆仑村), Pingtian (平天村), Napai (那派村), Pinggao (平搞村), Na bai (那白村), Yubai (玉柏村), Jiuta (九塔村), Naren (那任村)

== See also ==
- List of township-level divisions of Guangxi
