= Longtou Township =

Longtou 龙头乡
- Township
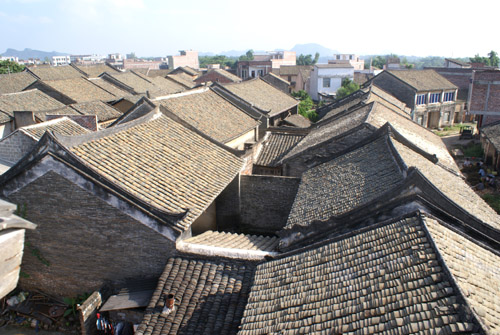
- Ancient Town in Longtou township
- Interactive map of Longtou
- Coordinates: 22°41′51″N 107°57′24″E
- Country: People's Republic of China
- Region: Guangxi
- Prefecture-level city: Chongzuo
- County: Fusui
- Village-level divisions: 1 residential communities 8 villages

Area
  - Total: 179.75 km^{2} (69.40 sq mi)

Population (2011)
  - Total: 32,000
  - Density: 180/km^{2} (460/sq mi)
- Time zone: UTC+8 (China Standard)
- Postal code: 532101

Longtou (simplified Chinese: 龙头乡; traditional Chinese: 龍頭鄉; pinyin: Lóngtóu Xiāng; zhuang: Lungzdouz Yangh) is a Township under the administration of Fusui County in southern Guangxi Zhuang Autonomous Region, China. As of 2011, it had an area of 179.75 square kilometres (69.40 sq mi) populated by 32,000 people residing in 1 residential communities (社区) and 8 villages.

== Administrative divisions ==
There are 1 residential communities and 8 villages:

Residential communities:

- Longtou (龙头社区)

Villages:

- Tengguang (滕广村), Jiuzhuang (旧庄村), Fengzhuang (凤庄村), Xiaohan (肖汉村), Natang (那塘村), Tanlong (坛龙村), Nagui (那贵村), Linwang (林旺村)

== See also ==
- List of township-level divisions of Guangxi
