= Dongluo =

Dongluo 东罗镇
- Town
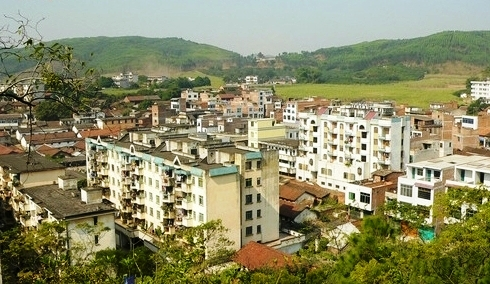
- Dongluo town
- Interactive map of Dongluo
- Coordinates: 22°23′58″N 107°41′06″E
- Country: People's Republic of China
- Region: Guangxi
- Prefecture-level city: Chongzuo
- County: Fusui
- Village-level divisions: 9 villages

Area
  - Total: 215.5 km^{2} (83.2 sq mi)

Population (2011)
  - Total: 41,000
  - Density: 190/km^{2} (490/sq mi)
- Time zone: UTC+8 (China Standard)
- Postal code: 532115

Dongluo (simplified Chinese: 东罗镇; traditional Chinese: 東罗鎮; pinyin: Dōngluó Zhèn; zhuang: Dunghloz Cin) is a town under the administration of Fusui County in the southern Guangxi Zhuang Autonomous Region, China. As of 2011, it had an area of 215.5 square kilometres (83.2 sq mi) and a population of 41,000, residing in nine villages. Approximately 94% of the population belong to the Zhuang ethnic group.

== Administrative divisions ==
There are 9 villages, including: Dongluo (东罗村), Kelan (客兰村), Douchong (都充村), Nalian (那练村), Cenfan (岑凡村), Qukan (渠坎村), Bayang (岜羊村), Dongdou (东斗村), and Houzhai (厚寨村).

== See also ==
- List of township-level divisions of Guangxi
