= Elephant Waterfalls =

Waterfall in Vietnam

- Thác Liêng Rơwoa
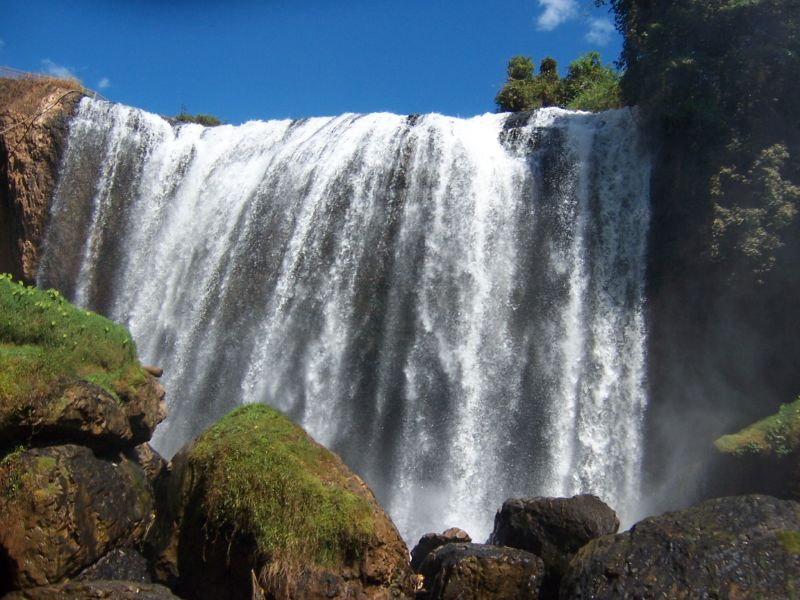
- Elephant Waterfalls, Nam Ban, Lâm Hà District, Lâm Đồng Province, Vietnam

- Location within Vietnam
- Location: Nam Ban, Lâm Hà District, Lâm Đồng Province, Vietnam
- Coordinates: 11°49′24″N 108°20′05″E
- Total height: 30 m (98 ft)
- Number of drops: 1
- Total width: 15 m (49 ft)

Elephant Waterfalls (Vietnamese: Thác Voi) is a waterfall in the Central Highlands of Vietnam. It is located about 25 km from Da Lat on the Cam Ly River.

A path with steps carved out into the slippery rocks leads to the foot of the falls. Bats roam around the area, where they inhabit a cave under the waterfalls.

== See also ==
- K50 Waterfall
