= Jiangzhou =

Jiangzhou may refer to:

== Places in China formerly or currently named Jiangzhou ==
- Jiangzhou District (江州区), Chongzuo, Guangxi
  - Jiangzhou Town (江州镇), town in Jiangzhou District
- Jiangzhou (state) (絳州), state of the Northern Zhou in modern-day Xinjiang County, Shanxi
- Chongqing Municipality, known as Jiangzhou (江州) during the State of Qin (316 BCE)
- Jiangxi province, known as Jiangzhou (江州) during the Western Jin (CE 291)
  - Jiangzhou Prefecture, a prefecture in modern Jiangxi, China between the 6th and 14th centuries
- Jiangzhou Prefecture (Shanxi), a prefecture in modern Shanxi, China between the 6th and 20th centuries
- Jiangzhou Township (江洲瑶族乡), township in Fengshan County, Guangxi

== Others ==
- Jiangzhou (fictional city) in China, featured in the television show Dwelling Narrowness
