= Ngườm Ngao Cave =

- Động Ngao
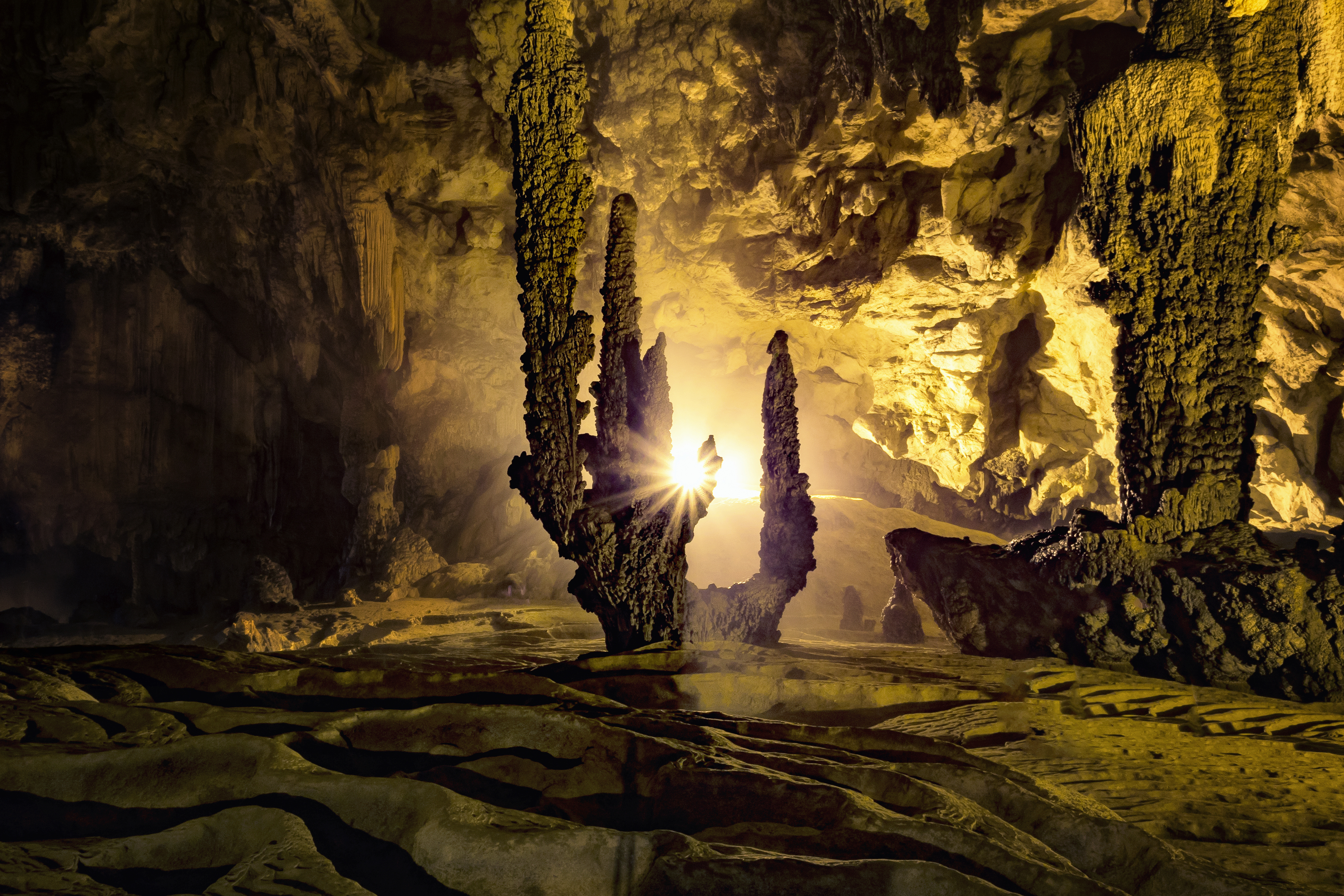

- Location within Vietnam
- Location: Bản Gun, Đàm Thủy commune, Trùng Khánh district, Cao Bằng province, Vietnam
- Coordinates: 22°50′43″N 106°42′22″E
- Depth: 980 m
- Length: 2,144 m (7,034 ft)
- Geology: Limestone
- Entrances: Ngườm Ngao, Ngườm Lồm, Bản Thuôn

Ngườm Ngao Cave (Vietnamese: Động Ngao) is a limestone cave situated in Bản Gun village, Đàm Thủy commune, Trùng Khánh district, Cao Bằng province, Vietnam. Positioned approximately 3-5 kilometers from the renowned Bản Giốc Waterfall, this cave represents a pivotal geological formation in northern Vietnam, characterized by intricate stalactite and stalagmite structures.

The cave extends 2,144 meters in length, featuring three primary entrances and a consistent internal temperature of 18-25°C. Discovered in 1921 and surveyed in 1995, Ngườm Ngao Cave opened to tourists in 1996, drawing visitors to its natural wonders.

== Etymology ==
In the Tày language, "Ngườm" signifies "cave," while "Ngao" denotes "tiger," thus translating to "Tiger Cave."

== History ==
Ngườm Ngao Cave formed through limestone deposition over millions of years, with scientific estimates placing its origin around 300 million years before the Common Era. French and Vietnamese officials discovered the cave in 1921 during a visit to Bản Giốc Waterfall. A 1995 survey by the Royal Geographical Society of Britain documented its total length and features. The site opened for tourism in 1996, establishing it as a key attraction in Cao Bằng.

== Description ==
The cave encompasses diverse stalactite and stalagmite formations, naturally sculpted by limestone erosion and mineral deposits. Notable features include the inverted lotus platform, silver and golden trees, coral-like structures, dragon boats, terraced rice fields, lonely stone pillars, and four heavenly pillars. Internal streams contribute to the auditory ambiance, with pathways facilitating exploration of approximately 2 km.

== Tourism ==
Ngườm Ngao Cave attracts domestic and international visitors, often paired with tours to Bản Giốc Waterfall. Illuminated paths and guided routes enhance accessibility, though some sections remain slippery and narrow.
