= Dongmen, Fusui County =

Dongmen 东门镇
- Town
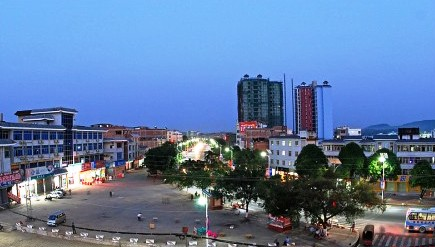
- Night view in Dongmen town
- Interactive map of Dongmen
- Coordinates: 22°20′22″N 107°49′59″E
- Country: People's Republic of China
- Region: Guangxi
- Prefecture-level city: Chongzuo
- County: Fusui
- Village-level divisions: 1 residential communities 15 villages

Area
  - Total: 378.2 km^{2} (146.0 sq mi)

Population (2011)
  - Total: 44,000
  - Density: 120/km^{2} (300/sq mi)
- Time zone: UTC+8 (China Standard)
- Postal code: 532108

Dongmen (simplified Chinese: 东门镇; traditional Chinese: 東門鎮; pinyin: Dōngmén Zhèn; zhuang: Dunghmonz Cin) is a town under the administration of Fusui County in southern Guangxi Zhuang Autonomous Region, China. As of 2011, it had an area of 378.2 square kilometres (146.0 sq mi) populated by 44,000 people residing in 1 residential communities (社区) and 15 villages.

== Administrative divisions ==
There are 1 residential communities and 15 villages:

Residential communities:

- Dongmen (东门社区)

Villages:

- Banbao (板包村), Baidang (佰党村), Haozuo (郝佐村), Liutou (六头村), Balou (岜楼村), Qurong (渠荣村), Bulian (布练村), Jiucheng (旧城村), Zìyao (自尧村), Buge (卜葛村), Najiang (那江村), Naba (那巴村), Jiangbian (江边村), Lingnan (岭南村), Tuoda (驮达村)

== See also ==
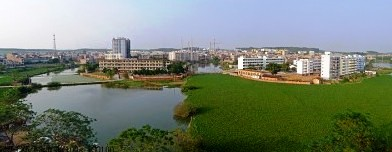
Dongmen town

- List of township-level divisions of Guangxi
