= Liuqiao, Guangxi =

Liuqiao 柳桥镇
- Town
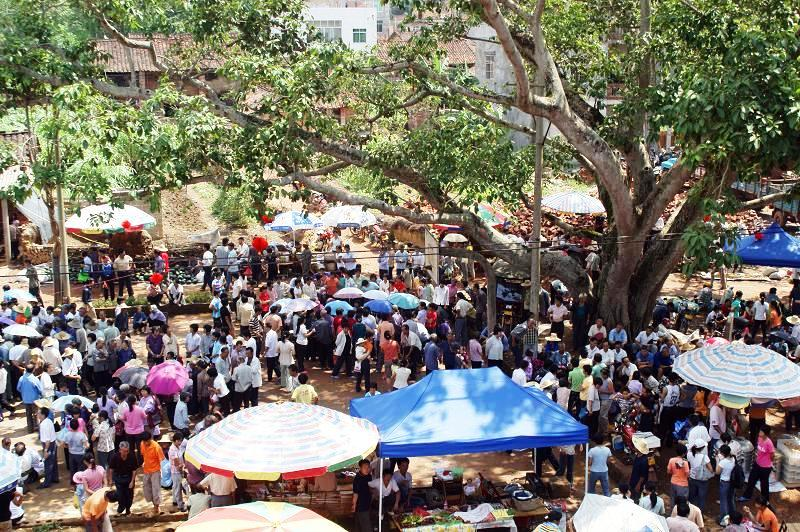
- Zhuang's song Fair in Liuqiao town
- Interactive map of Liuqiao
- Coordinates: 22°15′38″N 107°38′39″E
- Country: People's Republic of China
- Region: Guangxi
- Prefecture-level city: Chongzuo
- County: Fusui
- Village-level divisions: 1 residential communities 12 villages

Area
  - Total: 327.4 km^{2} (126.4 sq mi)

Population (2011)
  - Total: 33,000
  - Density: 100/km^{2} (260/sq mi)
- Time zone: UTC+8 (China Standard)
- Postal code: 532106

Liuqiao (simplified Chinese: 柳桥镇; traditional Chinese: 柳橋鎮; pinyin: Qújiù Zhèn; zhuang: Liujgyauz Cin) is a town under the administration of Fusui County in southern Guangxi Zhuang Autonomous Region, China. As of 2011, it had an area of 327.4 square kilometres (126.4 sq mi) populated by 33,000 people residing in 1 residential communities (社区) and 12 villages.

== Administrative divisions ==
There are 1 residential communities and 12 villages:

Residential communities:

- Qujiu (柳桥社区)

Villages:

- Leida (雷大村), Shangtun (上屯村), Baliu (岜留村), Zaowa (灶瓦村), Xincun (新村村), Quqi (渠齐村), Xichangn (西长村), Fuba (扶岜村), Poli (坡利村), Pokan (坡龛村), Pingpo (平坡村), Najia (那加村)

== See also ==
- List of township-level divisions of Guangxi
