= Shangshi, Guangxi =

Shangshi 上石镇
- Town
- Location in Guangxi
- Coordinates: 22°4′29″N 106°50′12″E
- Country: People's Republic of China
- Autonomous region: Guangxi
- Prefecture-level city: Chongzuo
- County-level city: Pingxiang
- Time zone: UTC+8 (China Standard)

Shangshi (Chinese: 上石; pinyin: Shàngshí) is a town under the administration of Pingxiang, Guangxi, China. As of 2023, it administers Shangshi Residential Community and the following eight villages:

- Pudong Village (浦东村)
- Bailong Village (白龙村)
- Yan'an Village (燕安村)
- Xia'ao Village (下嶅村)
- Madong Village (马垌村)
- Lianjiang Village (练江村)
- You'ai Village (油隘村)
- Banwang Village (板旺村)
