= Bapen Township =

Bapen 岜盆乡
- Township
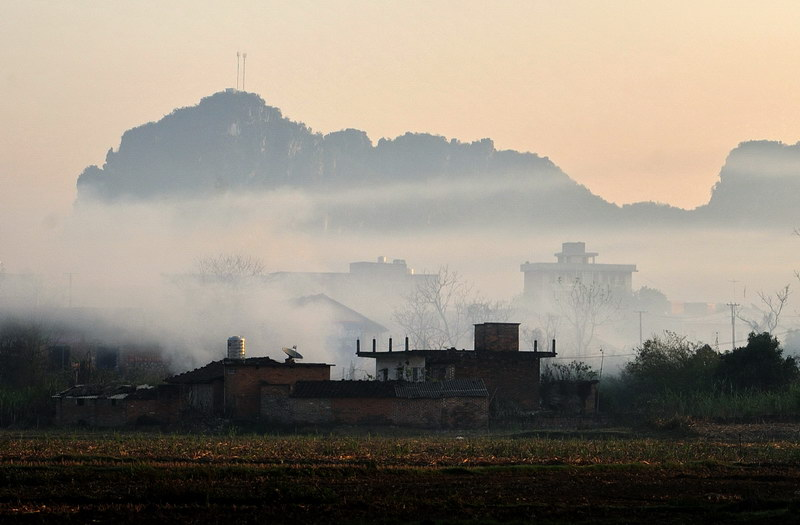
- Dawn in Bapen Township
- Interactive map of Bapen
- Coordinates: 22°31′25″N 107°51′51″E
- Country: People's Republic of China
- Region: Guangxi
- Prefecture-level city: Chongzuo
- County: Fusui
- Village-level divisions: 8 villages

Area
  - Total: 152 km^{2} (59 sq mi)

Population (2011)
  - Total: 27,552
  - Density: 181/km^{2} (469/sq mi)
- Time zone: UTC+8 (China Standard)
- Postal code: 532102

Bapen (simplified Chinese: 岜盆乡; traditional Chinese: 岜盆鄉; pinyin: Bāpén Xiāng; zhuang: Bahbwnz Yangh) is a Township under the administration of Fusui County in southern Guangxi Zhuang Autonomous Region, China. As of 2011, it had an area of 152 square kilometres (59 sq mi) populated by 27,552 people residing in 8 villages.

== Administrative divisions ==
There are 8 villages:

Villages:

- Napo (那坡村), Gudou (姑豆村), Nabiao (弄廪村), Balun (岜伦村), Nongdong (弄洞村), Tuoliao (驮辽村), Nabiao (那标村), Bapen (岜盆村)

== See also ==
- List of township-level divisions of Guangxi
