= Zhongdong, Guangxi =

Zhongdong 中东镇
- Town
- Interactive map of Zhongdong
- Coordinates: 22°49′54″N 107°49′59″E
- Country: People's Republic of China
- Region: Guangxi
- Prefecture-level city: Chongzuo
- County: Fusui
- Village-level divisions: 1 residential communities 14 villages

Area
  - Total: 422 km^{2} (163 sq mi)

Population (2011)
  - Total: 38,000
  - Density: 90/km^{2} (230/sq mi)
- Time zone: UTC+8 (China Standard)
- Postal code: 532114

Zhongdong (simplified Chinese: 中东镇; traditional Chinese: 中東鎮; pinyin: Zhōngdōng Zhèn; Zhuang: Cunghdungh Cin) is a town under the administration of Fusui County in southern Guangxi Zhuang Autonomous Region, China. As of 2011, it had an area of 422 square kilometres (163 sq mi) populated by 38,000 people residing in 1 residential communities (社区) and 14 villages.

== Administrative divisions ==
There are 1 residential communities and 14 villages:

Residential communities:

- Zhongdong (中东社区)

Villages:

- Xinling (新灵村), Pingshan (瓶山村), Jiuxian (旧县村), Fengpo (丰坡村), Jiuhe (九和村), Sitong (思同村), Xinlong (新隆村), Baiyu (百域村), Shangyu (上余村), Sanshao (三哨村), Dongshao (东哨村), Linhe (淋和村), Sixin (四新村), Weijiu (维旧村)

== See also ==
- List of township-level divisions of Guangxi
