= Xinning =

Xinning may refer to:

- Xinning County, Hunan, administered as part of Shaoyang Prefecture
- Xinning County, Guangdong, the former name of Taishan
  - Xinning Railway, the modernized spelling of the Sun Ning Railway, which connected Taishan to its port and hinterland in the early 20th century
- Xinning, Gansu, a town in Ning County
- Xinning, Guangxi, a town in Fusui County
- Xinning, Jiangxi, a town in Wuning County
