= Tiandeng County =

Tiandeng County 天等县 · Denhdwngj Yen
- County
- Location of the seat in Guangxi
- Coordinates: 23°04′52″N 107°08′35″E
- Country: China
- Region: Guangxi
- Prefecture-level city: Chongzuo
- County seat: Tiandeng Town (天等镇)

Area
  - Total: 2,159 km^{2} (834 sq mi)
- Elevation: 448 m (1,470 ft)

Population (2020)
  - Total: 280,473
  - Density: 129.9/km^{2} (336.5/sq mi)
- Time zone: UTC+8 (China Standard)
- Website: www.tiandeng.gov.cn

Tiandeng (simplified Chinese: 天等县; traditional Chinese: 天等縣; pinyin: Tiānděng Xiàn, Zhuang: Denhdwngj Yen) is a county in the southwest of Guangxi, China. It is the northernmost county-level division of the prefecture-level city of Chongzuo.

== Administrative divisions ==
There are 6 towns and 7 townships in the county:

Towns

Tiandeng Town (天等镇), Longming Town (龙茗镇), Jinjie Town (进结镇), Xiangdu Town (向都镇), Dongping Town (东平镇), Fuxin Town (福新镇)

Townships

Dukang Township (都康乡), Ninggan Township (宁干乡), Tuokan Township (驮堪乡), Jinyuan Township (进远乡), Shangying Township (上映乡), Bahe Township (把荷乡), Xiaoshan Township (小山乡)

== Climate ==
Climate data for Tiandeng, elevation 454 m (1,490 ft), (1991–2020 normals, extremes 1981–2010)
Month	Jan	Feb	Mar	Apr	May	Jun	Jul	Aug	Sep	Oct	Nov	Dec	Year
Record high °C (°F)	28.0 (82.4)	33.6 (92.5)	33.9 (93.0)	37.3 (99.1)	36.9 (98.4)	36.0 (96.8)	36.7 (98.1)	37.0 (98.6)	36.1 (97.0)	33.6 (92.5)	31.1 (88.0)	29.2 (84.6)	37.3 (99.1)
Mean daily maximum °C (°F)	15.8 (60.4)	18.1 (64.6)	20.9 (69.6)	25.8 (78.4)	29.0 (84.2)	30.5 (86.9)	31.2 (88.2)	31.2 (88.2)	29.8 (85.6)	26.7 (80.1)	22.9 (73.2)	18.3 (64.9)	25.0 (77.0)
Daily mean °C (°F)	12.2 (54.0)	14.4 (57.9)	17.4 (63.3)	22.0 (71.6)	24.9 (76.8)	26.5 (79.7)	26.9 (80.4)	26.7 (80.1)	25.0 (77.0)	21.8 (71.2)	18.0 (64.4)	13.7 (56.7)	20.8 (69.4)
Mean daily minimum °C (°F)	9.7 (49.5)	11.9 (53.4)	15.0 (59.0)	19.2 (66.6)	21.9 (71.4)	23.7 (74.7)	24.1 (75.4)	23.8 (74.8)	22.0 (71.6)	18.7 (65.7)	14.8 (58.6)	10.7 (51.3)	18.0 (64.3)
Record low °C (°F)	0.6 (33.1)	1.7 (35.1)	2.3 (36.1)	8.1 (46.6)	12.9 (55.2)	16.4 (61.5)	18.7 (65.7)	21.1 (70.0)	14.3 (57.7)	9.2 (48.6)	4.4 (39.9)	0.2 (32.4)	0.2 (32.4)
Average precipitation mm (inches)	48.6 (1.91)	35.7 (1.41)	65.6 (2.58)	71.0 (2.80)	185.0 (7.28)	258.9 (10.19)	250.4 (9.86)	233.1 (9.18)	121.4 (4.78)	78.9 (3.11)	46.7 (1.84)	37.7 (1.48)	1,433 (56.42)
Average precipitation days (≥ 0.1 mm)	13.2	11.9	15.4	13.7	15.4	18.3	18.5	17.6	12.1	8.9	8.1	8.7	161.8
Average snowy days	0.2	0	0	0	0	0	0	0	0	0	0	0	0.2
Average relative humidity (%)	78	77	80	78	78	82	82	82	80	78	77	75	79
Mean monthly sunshine hours	63.4	66.5	63.5	106.8	149.1	149.0	176.1	191.6	175.6	154.3	132.8	114.7	1,543.4
Percentage possible sunshine	19	21	17	28	36	37	43	48	48	43	40	35	35
Source: China Meteorological Administration
