= Ban Gioc–Detian Falls =

Waterfall in the Sino-Vietnamese border

Bản Giốc – Detian Falls
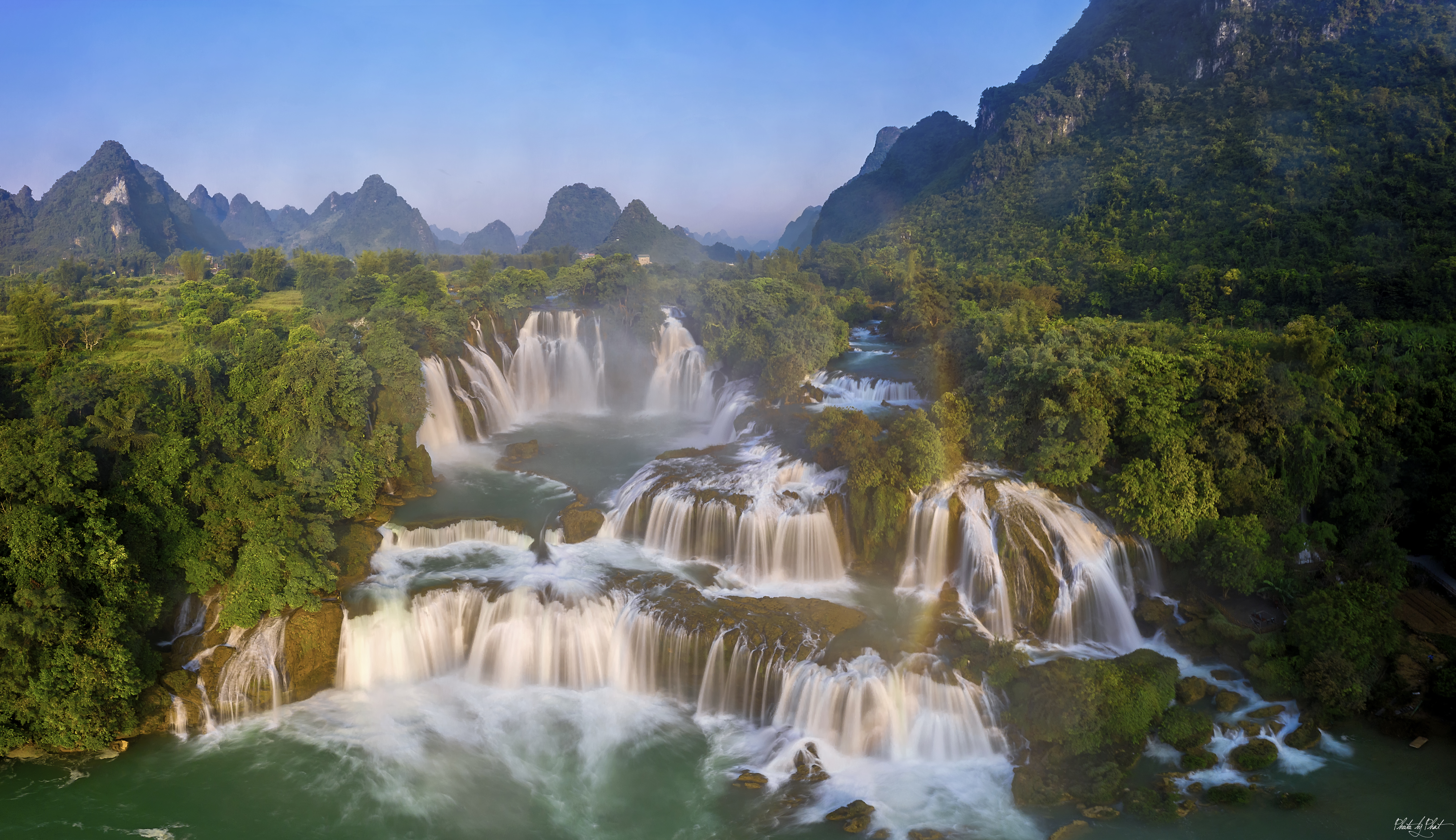
- Bản Giốc – Detian Falls

- Location within Eastern China Location within Guangxi Location within Vietnam
- Coordinates: 22°51′23″N 106°43′19″E
- Watercourse: Quây Sơn River

Ban Gioc–Detian Falls

Chinese name
- Traditional Chinese: 板約瀑布
- Simplified Chinese: 板约瀑布
Transcriptions
Standard Mandarin
- Hanyu Pinyin: Bǎnyuē pùbù
- Bopomofo: ㄅㄢˇ ㄩㄝ ㄆㄨˋ ㄅㄨˋ
- Wade–Giles: Pan^{3}-yüeh^{1} p'u^{4}-pu^{4}
- Tongyong Pinyin: Bǎn-yue pù-bù
- IPA: [pàn.ɥé pʰû.pû]
Yue: Cantonese
- Yale Romanization: Báanyeuk buhkbou
- Jyutping: baan2 joek3 buk6 bou3
- IPA: [pan˧˥ jœk̚˧ pʊk̚˨ pɔw˧]

Alternative Chinese name
- Chinese: 德天瀑布
Transcriptions
Standard Mandarin
- Hanyu Pinyin: Détiān pùbù
- Bopomofo: ㄉㄜˊ ㄊㄧㄢ ㄆㄨˋ ㄅㄨˋ
- Wade–Giles: Te^{4}-t'ien^{1} p'u^{4}-pu^{4}
- Tongyong Pinyin: Dé-tian pù-bù
- IPA: [tɤ̌.tʰjɛ́n pʰû.pû]
Yue: Cantonese
- Yale Romanization: Dāktīn buhkbou
- Jyutping: dak1 tin1 buk6 bou3
- IPA: [tɐk̚˥ tʰin˥ pʊk̚˨ pɔw˧]

Vietnamese name
- Vietnamese alphabet: thác Bản Giốc; thác Bản Ước; cặp thác Bản Giốc - Đức Thiên
- Hán-Nôm: 𣴜本篤; 𣴜板約; 扱𣴜本篤 — 德天

Bản Giốc – Detian Falls or Bản Giốc Falls is a collective name for two waterfalls on the Quây Sơn River (Vietnamese: Sông Quây Sơn, chữ Nôm: 滝𢮿山; Chinese: 归春河, Pinyin: Guīchūn hé) that straddle the international border between China and Vietnam; more specifically located between the Karst hills of Daxin County, Guangxi and Trùng Khánh District, Cao Bằng Province. The waterfalls are located 272 km (169 mi) north of Hanoi.

== Characteristics ==
Over thousands of years, the waterfall has eroded its crest and slowly moved upstream. It currently appears to be two waterfalls most of the time, but when the river is swollen due to summer rains can form one fall again.

In Vietnamese, the two falls are considered as two parts of one waterfall with the sole name Bản Giốc. The two parts are thác chính (Main waterfall) and thác phụ (Subordinate waterfall). Chinese texts sometimes name both of the water falls as Détiān Falls (Chinese: 德天瀑布) on the Chinese side.

The waterfall drops 30 m (98 ft). It is separated into three falls by rocks and trees, and the thundering effect of the water hitting the cliffs can be heard from afar.

It is currently the 4th largest waterfall along a national border, after Iguazu Falls, Victoria Falls, and Niagara Falls. Somewhat nearby is the 1,000 m (3,300 ft) long by 200 m (660 ft) wide Tongling Gorge (Tōnglíng dàxiágǔ 通灵大峽谷 "Tongling Grand Canyon") in Baise City (百色市), Guangxi province, accessible only through a cavern from an adjoining gorge. Rediscovered only recently, it has many species of endemic plants, found only in the gorge.

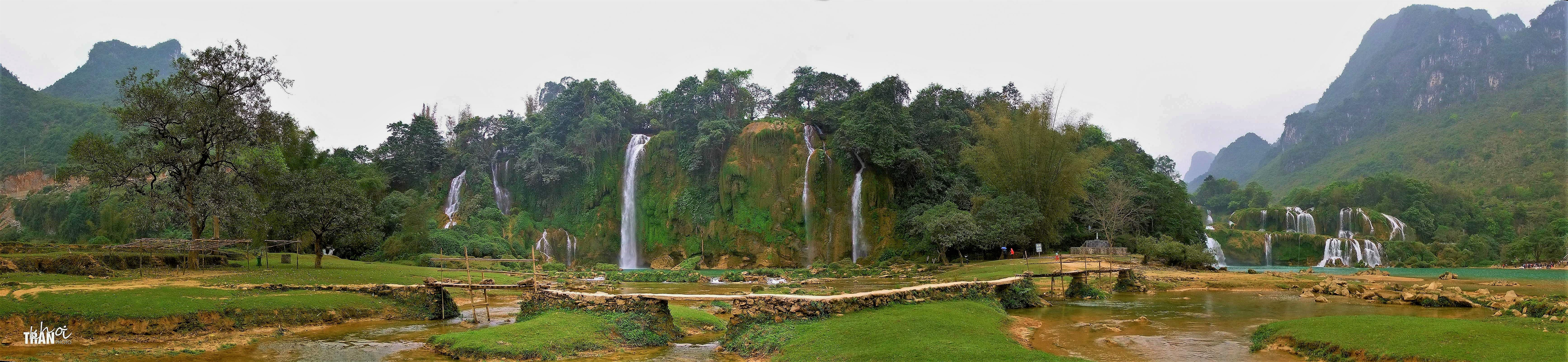
Panorama of Bản Giốc–Detian Falls

=== Geology ===
The waterfalls are located in an area of mature karst formations where the original limestone bedrock layers are being eroded. Numerous streams spring from underground fissures along the lower levels of the area. The waterfalls have multiple drops, from bedrock layer to layer, which shows the multiple depositions of sediments of different hardness which formed the terrain over millions of years.

== History ==
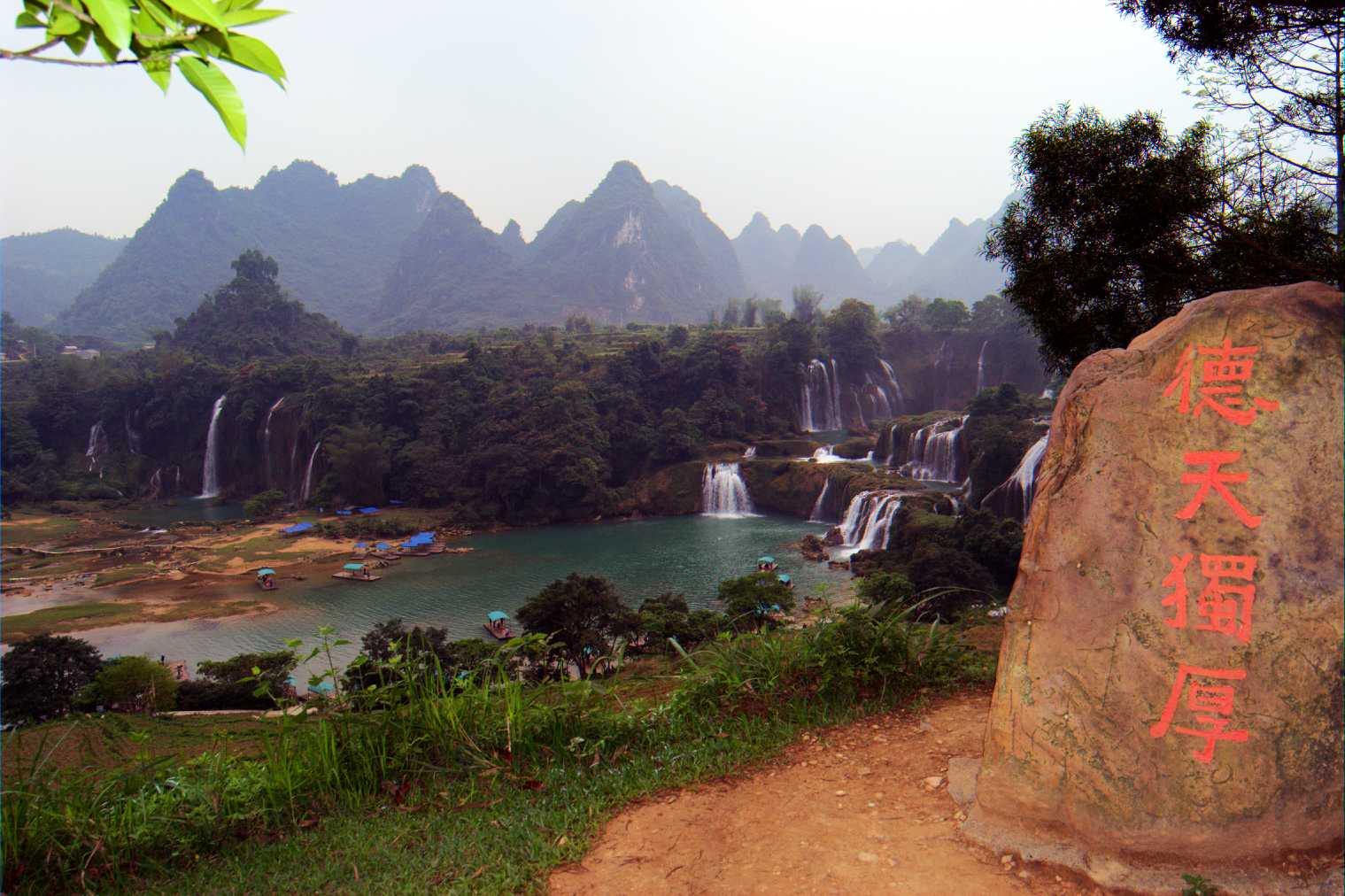
View from China in dry season

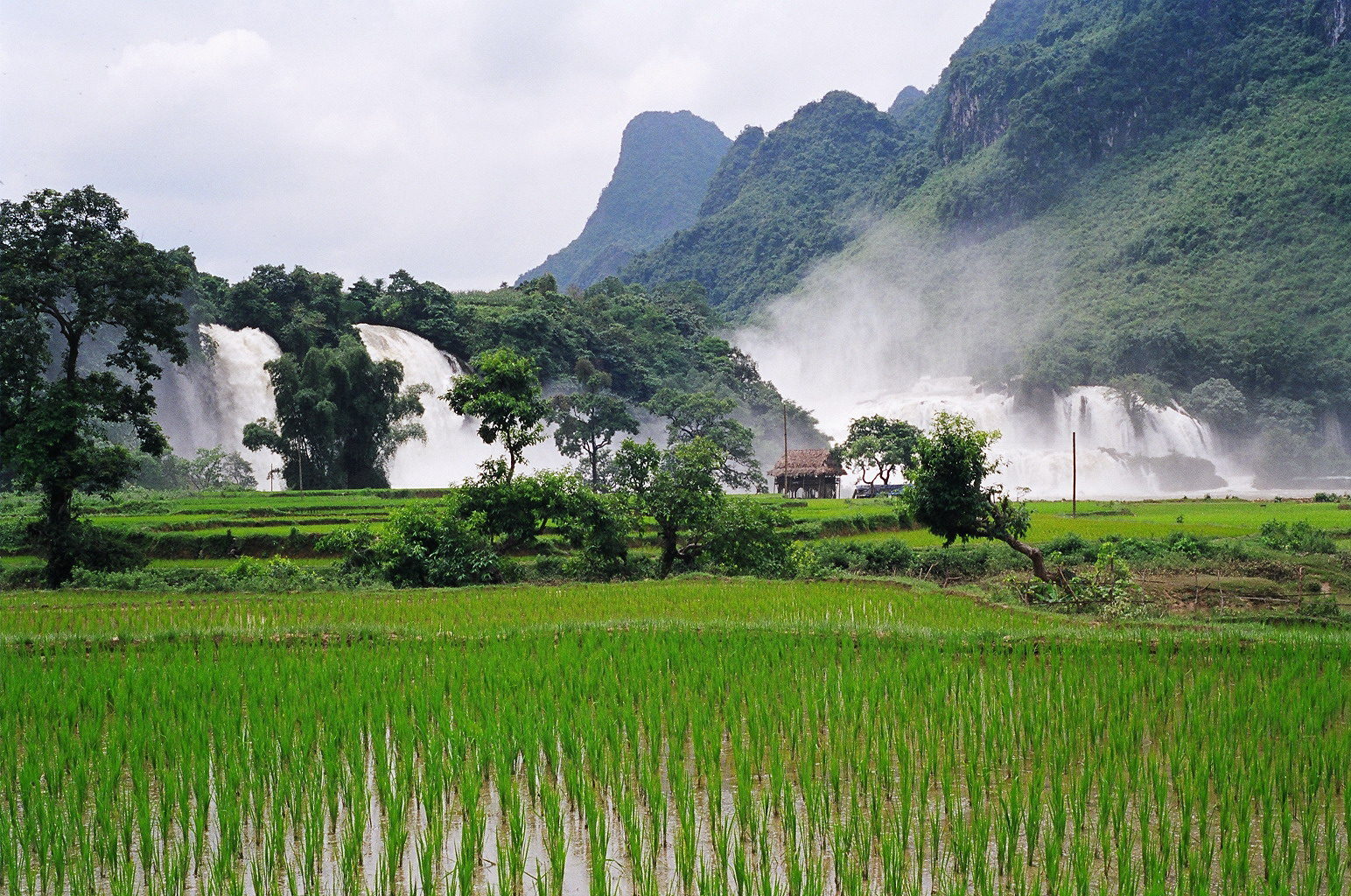
View of the falls from Vietnam during the rainy season when the flow is at its maximum

A road running along the top of the falls leads to a stone marker that demarcates the border between China and Vietnam in French and Chinese. Modern disputes arose as there are discrepancies as to the correlating legal documents on border demarcation and the placement of markers between the French and Qing administrations in the 19th century.

Disputes regarding the border demarcation at this location were settled in 1999 Viet Nam-China Treaty on Land Borderline. Additional talks were held as late as 2009 to clarify the treaty. However, there are controversies regarding the border demarcation around the Falls. One faction holds that the entirety of these falls belongs to Vietnam, and that the stone tablet had been moved there some time during or after the brief Sino-Vietnamese war of 1979. To the southeast, the land dispute also along the Sino-Vietnamese border also includes Nam Quan Gate (Ải Nam Quan) which the Vietnamese claimed as well. Historically, Nam Quan Gate served as the border marker and entry point to Vietnam between Vietnam and China (hence there's also a Vietnamese historical saying, that Vietnam stretched from Cape Cà Mau to Ải Nam Quan).

=== Impact on industry and commerce ===
The waterfalls increase the quality of life for people who live within the sound of the falls. A road running along the top of the falls leads to a stone marker that demarcates the border between China and Vietnam in French and Chinese. 20th century disputes could not be resolved where inaccuracies in documents, maps and descriptions that were made in the 19th century became difficult to differentiate. The disappearance or inaccurate replacement of markers and landmarks from time to time, and the varied patterns of transportation, settlement and land use from generation to generation, and the successive administrative differences throughout periods of war and strife led to both Vietnam and China understanding that exactly defining the border would increase prosperity in the long term.

The commercial focus of the area directly around the falls will likely remain tourism.

== Preservation efforts ==
Preservation of the resource may require future cooperation between the local communities by use of a perpetual joint oversight committee.

== See also ==
- List of waterfalls
- K50 Waterfall
