= Quây Sơn River =

River in People's Republic of China and Vietnam

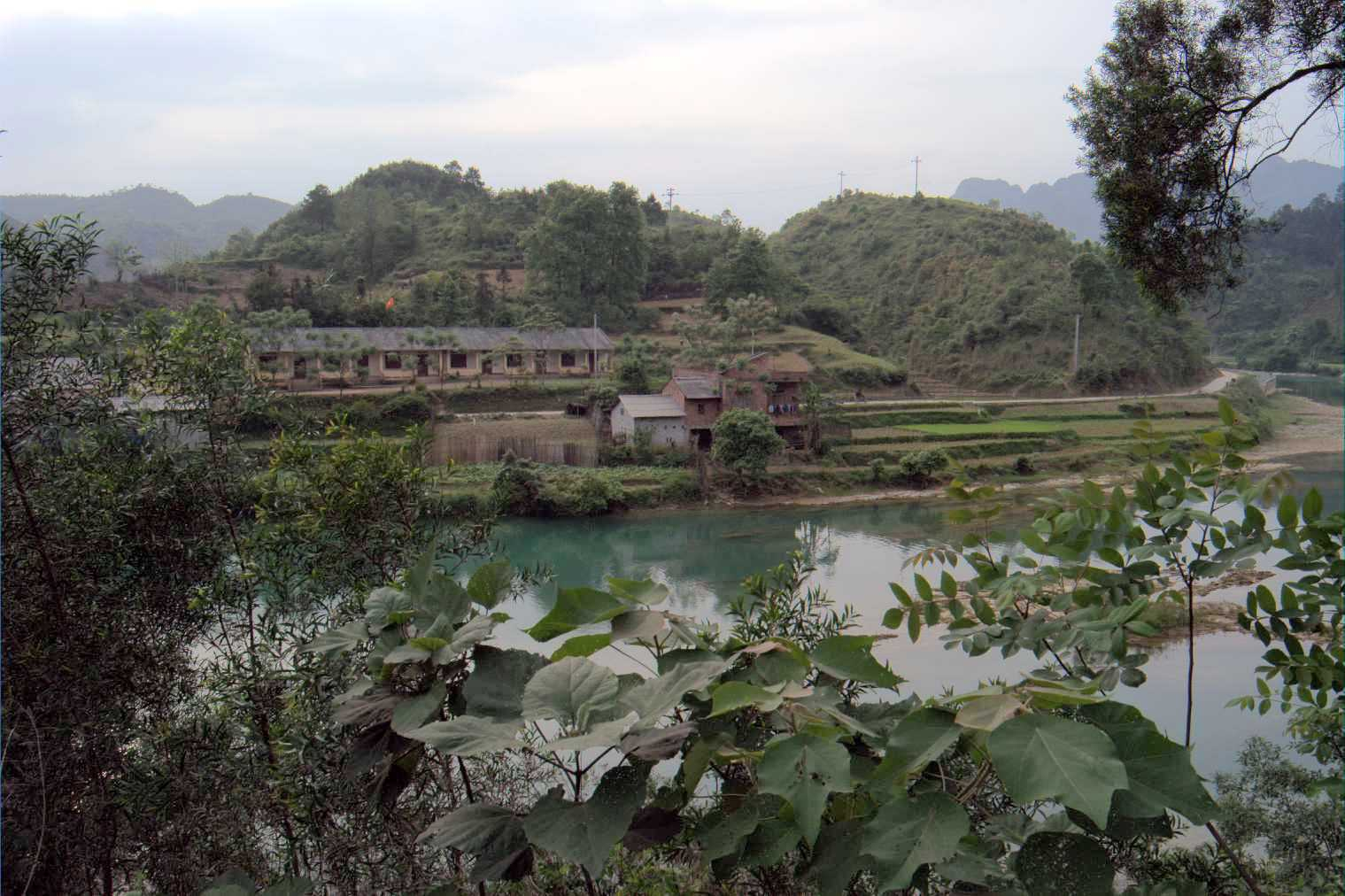
Quây Sơn or Guichun River - the Vietnamese side photographed from the Chinese side in the foreground.

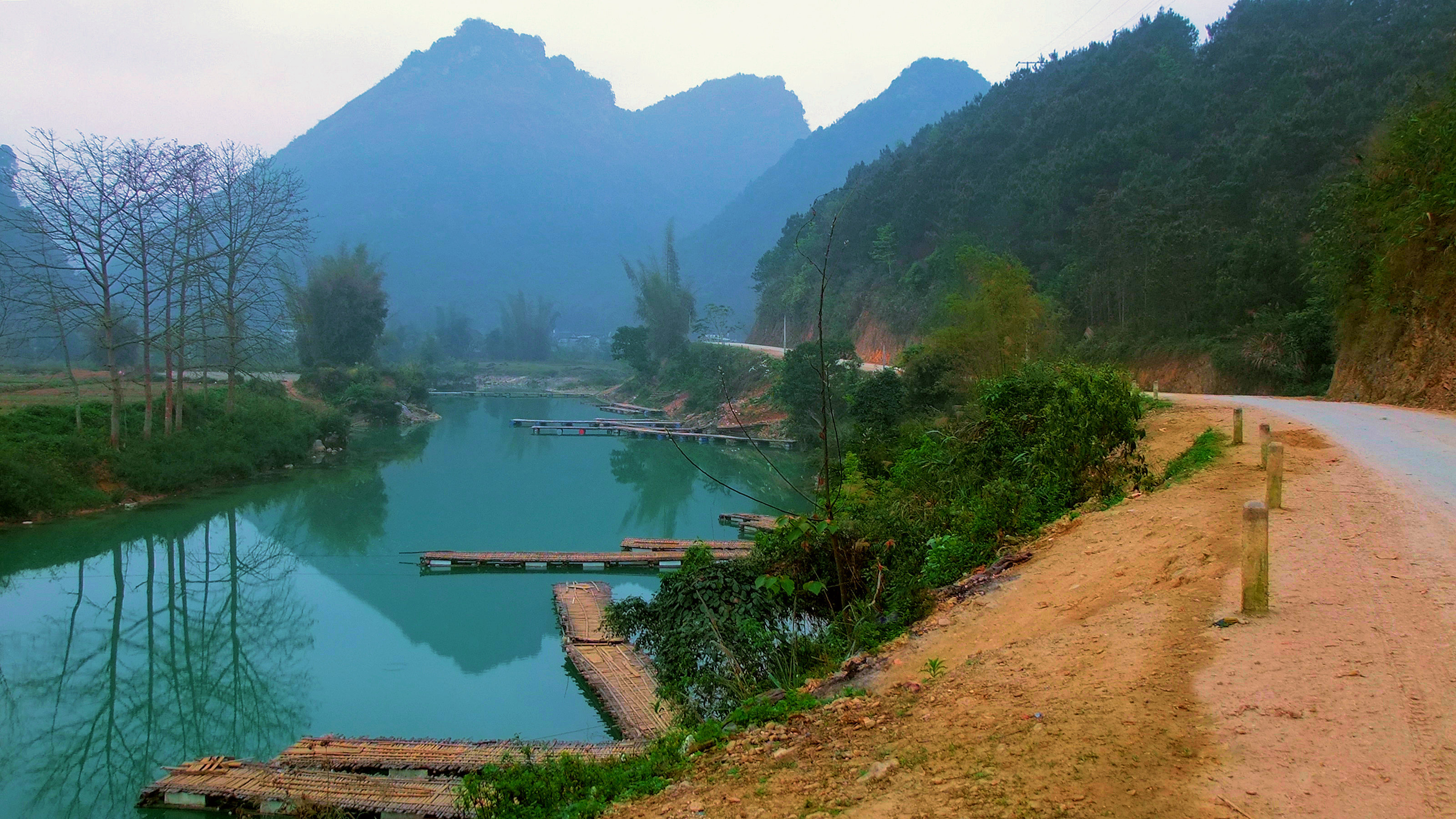
Quây Sơn River

The Quây Sơn River (Vietnamese: Sông Quây Sơn, Sông Quế Sơn; chữ Nôm: 滝𡇸山, 滝桂山) or the Guichun River in China (Chinese: 归春河, Pinyin: Guīchūn hé) is an international river that passes through the Cao Bằng Province in Vietnam and through the Guangxi province in China. Its river source is located in the county of Jingxi, in the Chongshan Mountain Range (Chinese:崇山峻岭, Pinyin: Chóngshān jùnlǐng).

For part of its length it runs along the Chinese–Vietnamese border, including the scenic Bản Giốc–Detian Falls.
