= Ningming County =

Ningming County 宁明县 · Ningzmingz Yen
- County
- Location of the seat in Guangxi
- Coordinates: 22°08′24″N 107°04′34″E
- Country: China
- Region: Guangxi
- Prefecture-level city: Chongzuo
- Township-level divisions: 7 towns 6 townships
- County seat: Chengzhong (城中镇)

Area
  - Total: 3,779 km^{2} (1,459 sq mi)
- Elevation: 118 m (387 ft)

Population (2020)
  - Total: 319,386
  - Density: 84.52/km^{2} (218.9/sq mi)
- Time zone: UTC+8 (China Standard)
- Website: nm.gxi.gov.cn

Ningming County (simplified Chinese: 宁明县; traditional Chinese: 寧明縣; pinyin: Níngmíng Xiàn, Zhuang: Ningzmingz Yen) is a county in southwestern Guangxi, China. It is famous for being home to the Hua mountain rock paintings World Heritage Site. A diverse range of languages and dialects are spoken alongside Mandarin Chinese, including local Yue Chinese called Pak Va (白话), Zuojiang Zhuang (左江壮语). It is under the administration of the prefecture-level city of Chongzuo and borders Vietnam's province of Lạng Sơn and City of Quảng Ninh.

== Administrative divisions ==
There are 7 towns and 6 townships in the county:

Towns

Chengzhong (城中镇), Aidian (爱店镇), Mingjiang (明江镇), Haiyuan (海渊镇), Tongmian (桐棉镇), Nakan (那堪镇), Tingliang (亭亮镇)

Townships

Zhai'an Township (寨安乡), Zhilang Township (峙浪乡), Dong'an Township (东安乡), Bangun Township (板棍乡), Beijiang Township (北江乡), Nanan Township (那楠乡)

== Climate ==
Climate data for Ningming, elevation 168 m (551 ft), (1991–2020 normals, extremes 1991–present)
Month	Jan	Feb	Mar	Apr	May	Jun	Jul	Aug	Sep	Oct	Nov	Dec	Year
Record high °C (°F)	31.0 (87.8)	35.6 (96.1)	36.4 (97.5)	41.3 (106.3)	41.7 (107.1)	39.9 (103.8)	39.2 (102.6)	38.2 (100.8)	37.4 (99.3)	35.7 (96.3)	33.7 (92.7)	31.3 (88.3)	41.7 (107.1)
Mean daily maximum °C (°F)	18.1 (64.6)	20.5 (68.9)	23.1 (73.6)	28.2 (82.8)	31.6 (88.9)	32.9 (91.2)	33.0 (91.4)	32.6 (90.7)	31.5 (88.7)	28.7 (83.7)	24.9 (76.8)	20.4 (68.7)	27.1 (80.8)
Daily mean °C (°F)	13.9 (57.0)	16.0 (60.8)	18.9 (66.0)	23.5 (74.3)	26.7 (80.1)	28.1 (82.6)	28.2 (82.8)	27.5 (81.5)	26.4 (79.5)	23.6 (74.5)	19.6 (67.3)	15.3 (59.5)	22.3 (72.2)
Mean daily minimum °C (°F)	10.9 (51.6)	12.8 (55.0)	16.0 (60.8)	20.1 (68.2)	23.1 (73.6)	24.7 (76.5)	24.9 (76.8)	24.3 (75.7)	22.9 (73.2)	19.8 (67.6)	15.7 (60.3)	11.7 (53.1)	18.9 (66.0)
Record low °C (°F)	1.5 (34.7)	1.0 (33.8)	3.9 (39.0)	9.6 (49.3)	15.2 (59.4)	17.8 (64.0)	20.3 (68.5)	21.7 (71.1)	15.4 (59.7)	8.9 (48.0)	3.2 (37.8)	0.6 (33.1)	0.6 (33.1)
Average precipitation mm (inches)	34.6 (1.36)	24.9 (0.98)	49.0 (1.93)	68.1 (2.68)	144.6 (5.69)	170.4 (6.71)	189.4 (7.46)	215.3 (8.48)	115.0 (4.53)	60.9 (2.40)	38.2 (1.50)	27.3 (1.07)	1,137.7 (44.79)
Average precipitation days (≥ 0.1 mm)	9.4	8.5	11.2	10.1	13.6	16.4	16.2	17.6	11.3	7.8	6.4	6.5	135
Average relative humidity (%)	78	78	80	78	77	81	81	84	81	77	77	75	79
Mean monthly sunshine hours	74.8	75.0	65.6	116.2	177.1	176.3	195.1	192.2	182.7	171.9	142.3	119.3	1,688.5
Percentage possible sunshine	22	23	18	30	43	44	48	49	50	48	43	36	38
Source: China Meteorological Administrationall-time October record
