= K50 Waterfall =

Waterfall in Kon Chu Rang Nature Reserve, Gia Lai province, Vietnam

- Hang Én Waterfall
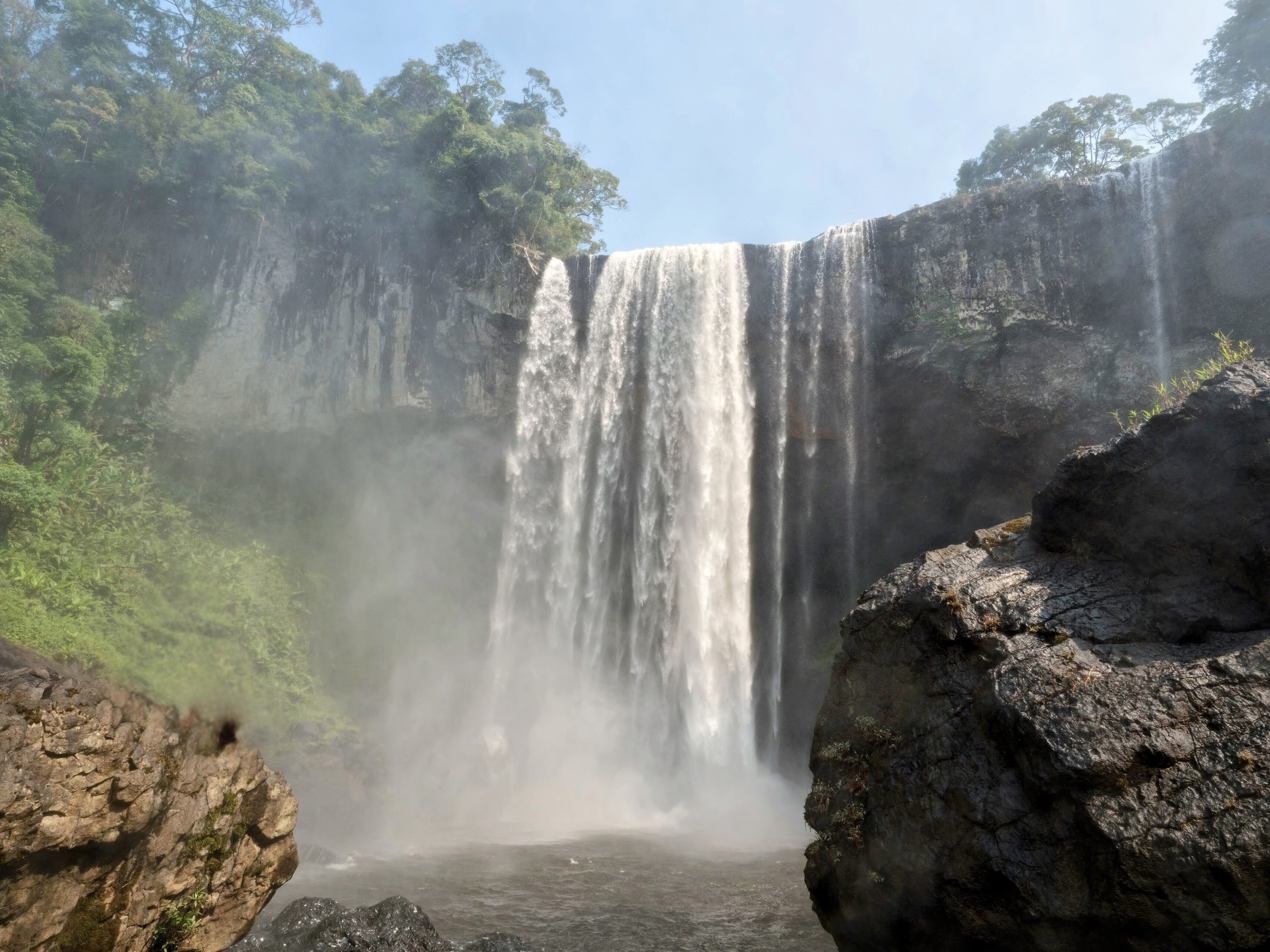
- K50 Waterfall (Hang Én Waterfall) in Kon Chu Rang Nature Reserve
- Interactive map of K50 Waterfall
- Location: Sơn Lang commune K'Bang district, Gia Lai province, Vietnam
- Coordinates: 14°31′10″N 108°36′22″E
- Type: Waterfall
- Total height: 50 to 54 m (164 to 177 ft)
- Number of drops: 1
- Watercourse: Côn River

The K50 Waterfall (Thác K50; also known as Hang Én Waterfall, thác Hang Én) is a waterfall in Kon Chu Rang Nature Reserve in Sơn Lang commune, Gia Lai province, in Vietnam's Central Highlands. It lies in the upper drainage basin of the Côn River and is about 150 km (93 mi) by road from Pleiku.

== Characteristics and naming ==
The waterfall drops about 50 m (160 ft), with some published figures reaching 54 m (177 ft). Reported widths range from roughly 20 to 100 m (66 to 328 ft), depending on season and viewing position.

K50 forms a single drop over an arched rock ledge, producing a curtain-like fall. A recessed cavity behind the falling water is known locally as hang Én ("swallow cave").

The name "K50" is often linked to the waterfall's approximate 50 m (160 ft) height, while "Hang Én" refers to the recess behind the water and local accounts of swallows in the area.

== Location and administration ==
K50 lies in the core zone of Kon Chu Rang Nature Reserve and is managed by the reserve's management board. The site lies near the administrative boundary with An Lão district (historically in Bình Định province, now Gia Lai). Other published accounts place it in Sơn Lang and Đak Roong communes of K'Bang district. A 2004 overview document for the nature reserve (summarizing surveys conducted in 1999) lists "Waterfall 50" at roughly 50 m (160 ft) high among the waterfalls in the upper Côn River basin.

Resolution 202/2025/QH15 reorganized provincial-level administrative units, merging Bình Định province and Gia Lai province under the name Gia Lai. Resolution 1664/NQ-UBTVQH15 merged Sơ Pai commune and Sơn Lang commune into a new commune named Sơn Lang; the resolution provided for the new unit to begin operating from July 1, 2025.

== Natural setting ==
K50 Waterfall lies in Kon Chu Rang Nature Reserve in the Kon Ha Nung highlands, on headwater streams of the Côn River system.

=== Geomorphology and geology ===
Remote-sensing studies of the Kon Ha Nung Plateau describe basalt-derived plateau surfaces and low-to-mid-elevation mountains developed on granite. A protected-area profile describes older rock units in the reserve, including Precambrian formations dated to about 1.4–2.5 billion years. The upper basin has many short streams and waterfalls.

=== Climate ===
Kon Ha Nung Plateau has a tropical monsoon highland climate. Mean annual temperature has been reported around 23.5 °C (74.3 °F), with annual rainfall commonly given as roughly 1,500 to 2,800 mm (59 to 110 in). A drier period is described as January–April and a rainy period as May–December, with headwater flows varying accordingly.

=== Hydrology ===
Headwater streams in the reserve feed the Côn River, which drains east toward the coastal lowlands historically associated with Bình Định province. A basin-scale technical report gives the Kone–Hà Thanh system at about 3,640 km^{2} (1,410 sq mi), and describes the Kone main stem as about 160 km (99 mi) long measured from the river mouth to its source. Vietnam's inter-reservoir operating rules for the Kôn–Hà Thanh system define an annual flood season from 1 September to 15 December and a dry season from 16 December to 31 August. Lower flows during the drier months improve access and visibility of the arched ledge and the recess behind the fall.

== Ecosystem ==
K50 is situated in evergreen forest habitats within Kon Chu Rang Nature Reserve, part of the core zone of the Kon Hà Nừng biosphere reserve designated by UNESCO in 2021 under the Man and the Biosphere Programme and the World Network of Biosphere Reserves. A provincial portal for the biosphere reserve gives a total area of 413,511.67 ha (1,021,809.6 acres), including core, buffer, and transition zones; Kon Chu Rang Nature Reserve lies within the core zone.

A 2004 overview document (summarizing a 1999 survey) records 546 species of vascular plants in the reserve, along with 62 mammal species and 169 bird species. A scientific summary report gives 413 vertebrate wildlife species and 211 insect species and lists threatened plant species and conservation-priority vertebrates in the area.

Two new species of Lasianthus (family Rubiaceae) have been described from Kon Chu Rang Nature Reserve. Specimens were recorded at elevations of roughly 900 to 1,100 m (3,000 to 3,600 ft) along routes between waterfalls in the reserve, including routes linking K50 with other waterfalls and access trails. Spray from the waterfall can create heavy mist, and rainbows can appear on sunny mornings under suitable viewing conditions.

=== Conservation and management ===
Kon Chu Rang Nature Reserve was established in 1986 (Decision No. 194/CT) with an area of about 16,000 ha (40,000 acres); a 1999 investment project defined zones for strict protection, ecological restoration, and buffer areas. A 2004 overview document gives the reserve area as about 15,900 ha (39,000 acres) and describes zoning and buffer areas at the time of compilation.

Kon Chu Rang and Kon Ka Kinh National Park form part of the core area of the Kon Hà Nừng biosphere reserve designated by UNESCO in 2021. Identified threats include hunting and wildlife trade; logging and extraction of forest products; agricultural expansion; infrastructure development and resource extraction; and forest fires; monitoring and enforcement are described as priorities for biodiversity protection.

Kon Chu Rang forms an ecotone between the eastern and western slopes of the Annamite Range (Trường Sơn), with high forest cover and a system of streams and waterfalls in the Côn River headwaters basin.

== History and culture ==
Bahnar folklore in the region includes stories associated with waterfalls; some accounts link But Jai to Hang Én Waterfall. The waterfall is promoted as a forest trekking destination in the area.

== Visiting ==
Access routes run from Gia Lai via main roads to the nature reserve gate, followed by a forest walk or hiking segment to reach the base of the waterfall. During the dry season, rock features and the arched recess behind the water are more visible; storms increase hazards such as slippery terrain and falling branches.

=== Incidents and safety ===
On July 3, 2024, a 55-year-old female tourist died after being struck by a falling tree while traveling by motorcycle on the access road to the waterfall during stormy weather. After the incident, safety measures on forest routes to tourist sites in the area were reviewed.

== See also ==
- Biosphere reserve
- Central Highlands (Vietnam)
- Côn River
- K'Bang district
- Kon Ka Kinh National Park
- Protected areas of Vietnam
