= Jiangzhou District =

Jiangzhou 江州区 · Gyanghcouh Gih
- District
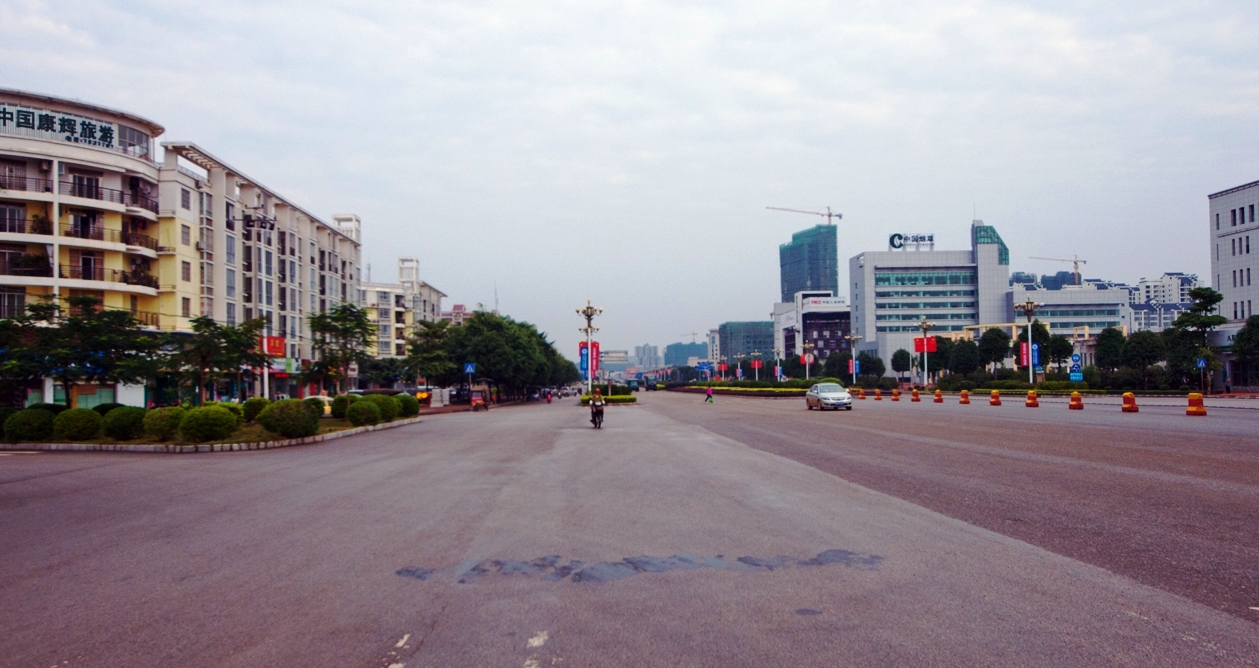

- Location in Guangxi
- Coordinates: 22°24′19″N 107°21′12″E
- Country: China
- Autonomous region: Guangxi
- Prefecture-level city: Chongzuo
- District seat: Jiangnan Subdistrict

Area
  - Total: 2,902 km^{2} (1,120 sq mi)
- Elevation: 112 m (367 ft)

Population (2020 census)
  - Total: 435,438
  - Density: 150.0/km^{2} (388.6/sq mi)
- Time zone: UTC+8 (China Standard)
- Website: www.czsjzq.gov.cn

Jiangzhou District (simplified Chinese: 江州区; traditional Chinese: 江州區; pinyin: Jiāngzhōu Qū, Zhuang: Gyanghcouh Gih) is a district and the seat of Chongzuo, Guangxi, China.

== Administrative divisions ==
There are 3 subdistricts, 6 towns and 2 townships in the district:

Subdistricts

Taiping Subdistrict (太平街道), Jiangnan Subdistrict (江南街道), Shijinglin Subdistrict (石景林街道).

Towns

Xinhe (新和镇), Laituan (濑湍镇), Jiangzhou Town (江州镇), Zuozhou (左州镇), Nalong (那隆镇), Tuolu (驮卢镇)

Townships

Luobai Township (罗白乡), Banli Township (板利乡)
