= Chongzuo =

Chongzuo 崇左市 • Cungzcoj Si Tsungtso
- Prefecture-level city
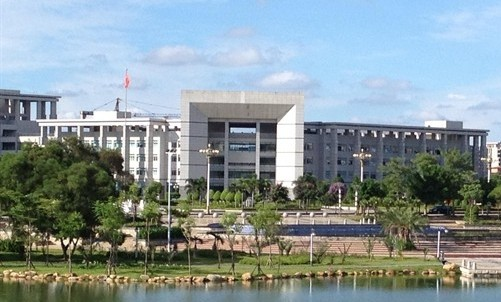
- Office building of the Chongzuo government

- Location of Chongzuo in Guangxi

- Location in China
- Coordinates (Chongzuo municipal government): 22°22′37″N 107°21′54″E
- Country: People's Republic of China
- Autonomous region: Guangxi
- Municipal seat: Jiangzhou District

Area
  - Total: 17,345 km^{2} (6,697 sq mi)

Population (2010)
  - Total: 2,347,700
  - Density: 135.35/km^{2} (350.56/sq mi)

GDP
  - Total: CN¥ 98.9 billion US$ 15.3 billion
  - Per capita: CN¥ 47,336; US$ 7,337
- Time zone: UTC+8 (China Standard)
- Postal code: 532200
- Area code: 0771
- ISO 3166 code: CN-GX-14
- Website: chongzuo.gov.cn

Chongzuo (Chinese: 崇左; pinyin: Chóngzuǒ; Zhuang: Cungzcoj) is a prefecture-level city in the south of Guangxi Zhuang Autonomous Region near the Sino-Vietnamese border. It is home to one of China's largest Zhuang populations.

== Geography and climate ==
Chongzuo is located in southwestern Guangxi Zhuang Autonomous Region. It borders Nanning to the east, Baise to the north, Fangchenggang to the south and Lạng Sơn, Vietnam to the west. The Zuo or Left River and the You or Right River have their confluence in Chongzuo after which the river becomes the Yong River. Chongzuo is mountainous and hilly with numerous karst formations similar to Guilin and northern Vietnam's Ha Long Bay. Its area is 17,732 km^{2} (6,846 sq mi), 10,529 km^{2} (4,065 sq mi) of which is forested.

Chongzuo's climate is humid subtropical and monsoon-influenced. January's average temperature is 14.1 °C (57.4 °F) and in July it is 28.9 °C (84.0 °F). Within the prefecture, the annual mean is 20.8–23 °C (69.4–73.4 °F). There are 330 frost-free days. Annual precipitation is between 1100-1300mm, much lower than other areas in Guangxi. Extremes there since at least 1951 range from −1.9 °C (28.6 °F) on January 12, 1955 to 41.5 °C (106.7 °F) on April 30, 2024.

Climate data for Chongzuo, elevation 196 m (643 ft), (1991−2020 normals, extremes 1955−present)
Month	Jan	Feb	Mar	Apr	May	Jun	Jul	Aug	Sep	Oct	Nov	Dec	Year
Record high °C (°F)	31.7 (89.1)	36.5 (97.7)	36.9 (98.4)	41.5 (106.7)	41.2 (106.2)	41.0 (105.8)	40.2 (104.4)	39.2 (102.6)	38.4 (101.1)	36.7 (98.1)	34.4 (93.9)	31.4 (88.5)	41.5 (106.7)
Mean daily maximum °C (°F)	18.4 (65.1)	20.0 (68.0)	23.3 (73.9)	29.0 (84.2)	32.4 (90.3)	33.5 (92.3)	33.8 (92.8)	33.6 (92.5)	32.5 (90.5)	29.9 (85.8)	25.8 (78.4)	21.0 (69.8)	27.8 (82.0)
Daily mean °C (°F)	14.1 (57.4)	16.3 (61.3)	19.2 (66.6)	24.2 (75.6)	27.3 (81.1)	28.7 (83.7)	28.9 (84.0)	28.5 (83.3)	27.4 (81.3)	24.6 (76.3)	20.4 (68.7)	15.9 (60.6)	23.0 (73.3)
Mean daily minimum °C (°F)	11.1 (52.0)	13.3 (55.9)	16.4 (61.5)	20.8 (69.4)	23.7 (74.7)	25.4 (77.7)	25.6 (78.1)	25.2 (77.4)	23.9 (75.0)	20.9 (69.6)	16.6 (61.9)	12.5 (54.5)	19.6 (67.3)
Record low °C (°F)	−1.9 (28.6)	2.8 (37.0)	6.6 (43.9)	9.5 (49.1)	15.1 (59.2)	20.3 (68.5)	22.3 (72.1)	22.3 (72.1)	16.0 (60.8)	11.0 (51.8)	5.9 (42.6)	1.8 (35.2)	−1.9 (28.6)
Average precipitation mm (inches)	34.6 (1.36)	27.5 (1.08)	48.7 (1.92)	79.5 (3.13)	138.3 (5.44)	178.4 (7.02)	205.8 (8.10)	197.1 (7.76)	110.6 (4.35)	62.8 (2.47)	42.6 (1.68)	27.4 (1.08)	1,153.3 (45.39)
Average precipitation days (≥ 0.1 mm)	9.6	9.3	12.4	11.2	13.8	17.0	16.9	16.3	11.1	7.1	6.7	6.2	137.6
Average snowy days	0.1	0	0	0	0	0	0	0	0	0	0	0	0.1
Average relative humidity (%)	76	75	78	75	74	78	79	80	77	73	73	72	76
Mean monthly sunshine hours	72.9	69.8	61.3	107.6	164.6	165.9	188.1	189.0	181.1	165.9	139.4	117.6	1,623.2
Percentage possible sunshine	22	22	16	28	40	41	46	48	50	46	42	35	36
Source: China Meteorological Administrationall-time extremesall-time October record

== History ==
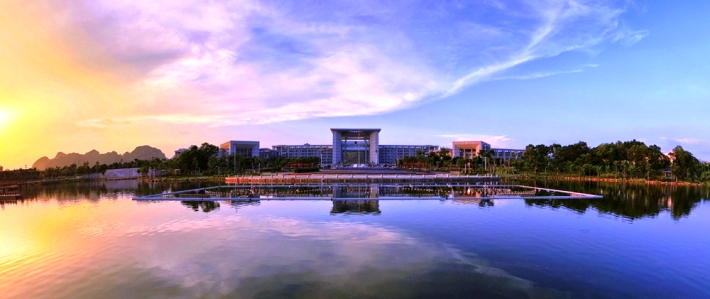
Chongzuo government buildings

Chongzuo is one of the earliest centers of Zhuang culture. Important sites dating back to the Stone Age have been found here. The Rock Paintings of Hua Mountain along the Ming River at Huashan date back 1800 to 2500 years and are one of the largest groups of pictographs in China and in the world. On several cliff faces are hundreds of large red pictographs depicting a large battle. The red pigment is still bright and vivid and individual figures, weapons, and animals are easy to distinguish. The cliffs, part of the sacred Frog Mountain, were important site to the early Zhuang.

In 214 BC, during the Qin dynasty, Chongzuo was part of the Xiang (象郡) commandry. Chinese general Feng Zicai beat back a French attack here at the Battle of Bang Bo in 1885. Sun Yat-sen fired the first cannon shot of the anti-Qing revolution in Chongzuo in 1907. In the 1930s, after fomenting rebellion in other parts of Guangxi, Deng Xiaoping helped organize the peasants and workers here during the Longzhou rebellion and eventually formed the Red Army's 8th Army. Later, in 1979, the Chinese army invaded Vietnam from here.

== Administration ==
Chongzuo has 1 district, 1 county-level city, 5 counties, 57 towns, 72 townships, 146 residential communities, and 1,724 villages.

District:

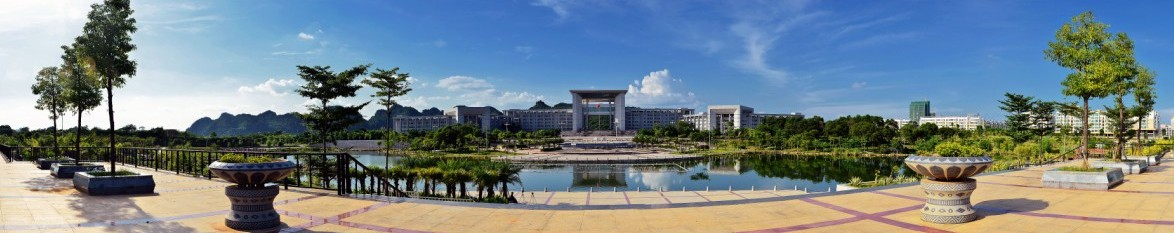
Central square of the Chongzuo city

- Jiangzhou District (江州区)

County-level city:

- Pingxiang City (凭祥市)

Counties:

- Fusui County (扶绥县)
- Daxin County (大新县)
- Tiandeng County (天等县)
- Ningming County (宁明县)
- Longzhou County (龙州县)

Map
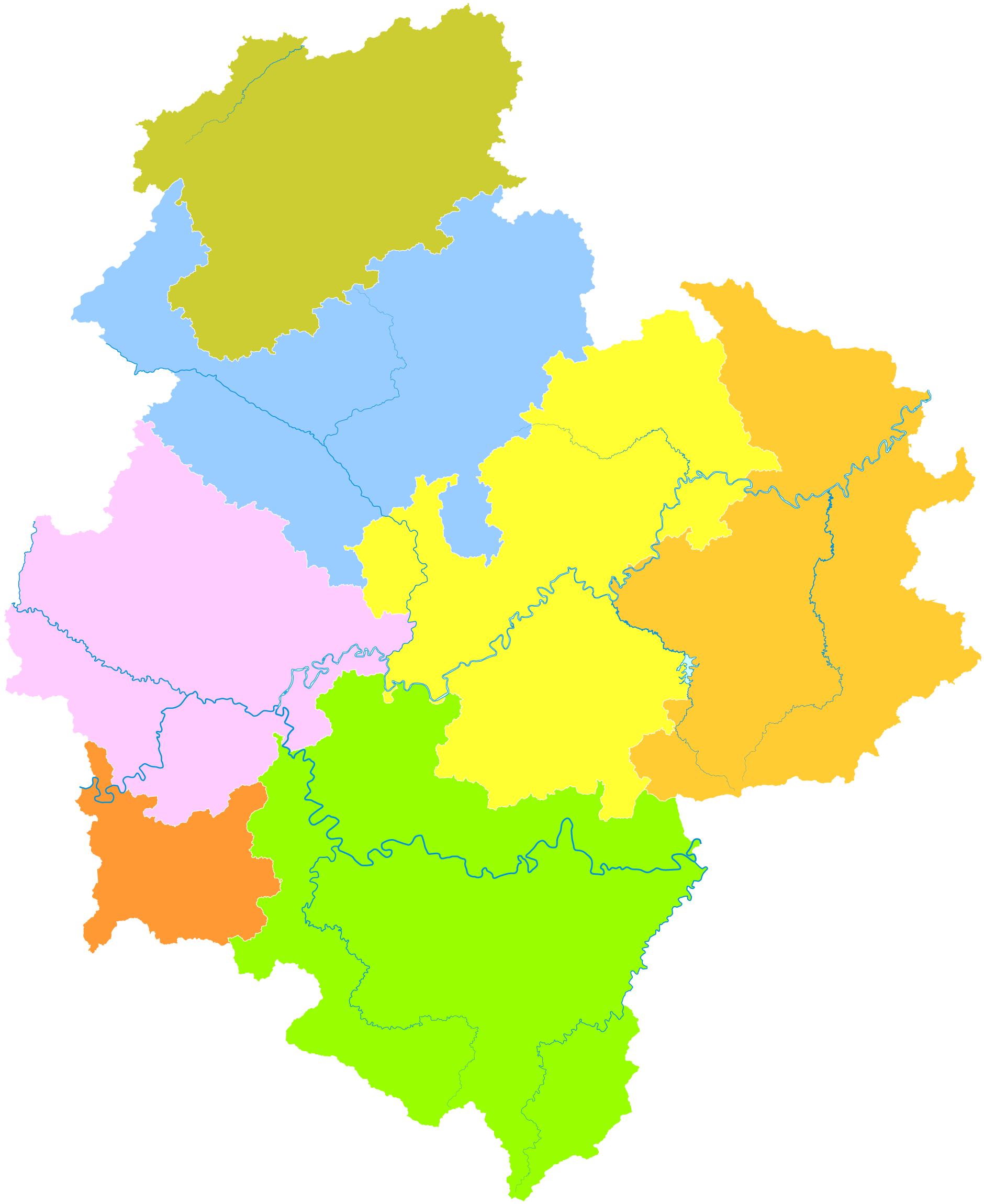

== Demographics ==
Chongzuo's population is 2,347,700. 88% of the people belong to the Zhuang ethnic group. The rest include Han, Yao, and other ethnic groups.The resident population at the end of 2024 is 2,046,100.

English name	Simplified	Traditional	Pinyin	Zhuang	Area	Population(2010 or 2012)
Jiangzhou District	江州区	江州區	Jiāngzhōu Qū	Gyanghcouh Gih	2,951	384,905(Zhuang people is 315,020 - According to the official statistics, 2012-03-15)
Fusui County	扶绥县	扶綏縣	Fúsuí Xiàn	Fuzsuih Yen	2,836	432,000 (81.96% of the people belong to the Zhuang ethnic group, 2010)
Ningming County	宁明县	寧明縣	Níngmíng Xiàn	Ningzmingz Yen	3,779	412,300 (77.6% of the people belong to the Zhuang ethnic group, 2010)
Longzhou County	龙州县	龍州縣	Lóngzhōu Xiàn	Lungzcouh Yen	2,318	260,200 (95.8% of the people belong to the Zhuang ethnic group, 2010)
Daxin County	大新县	大新縣	Dàxīn Xiàn	Dasinh Yen	2,742	359,800 (97.2% of the people belong to the Zhuang ethnic group, 2010)
Tiandeng County	天等县	天等縣	Tiānděng Xiàn	Denhdwngj Yen	2,159	429,200 (98.81% of the people belong to the Zhuang ethnic group, 2010)
Pingxiang	凭祥市	憑祥市	Píngxiáng Shì	Bingzsiengz Si	650	106,400 (83.5% of the people belong to the Zhuang ethnic group, 2010)

- These figures are based on the following official statistics:

== Economy ==
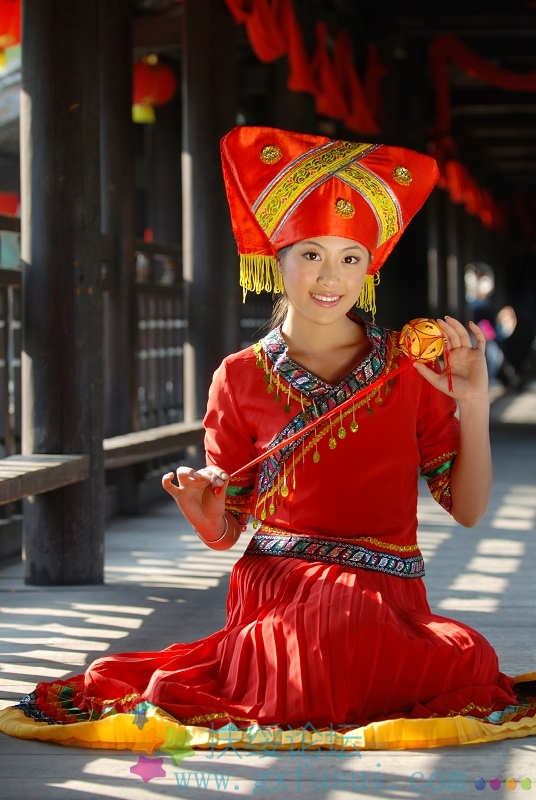
Zhuang woman in traditional costume in Chongzuo

Forestry and agriculture are two of Chongzuo's biggest industries. Oranges, rice, beans, corn, cassava, cinnamon, bananas, vegetables, durian, pineapples, longan, and tea are all major crops, but sugarcane is the center of Chongzuo agriculture. Farm raised animals include beef and dairy cattle, sheep, ducks, chickens, geese, and bees. Aquaculture for fish is also big. Chinese medicinal herbs are picked from the wild and also grown. Important mineral resources include manganese, gold, ferberite, coal, barite, bentonite, uranium, and vanadium. It is China's biggest manganese producer and the world's biggest producer of bentonite. Other industries include export infrastructure, paper, forest products such as timber and turpentine, building materials, pharmaceuticals, and electronics manufacturing.

== Flora and fauna ==
Chongzuo has more than 4000 species of plants and more than 450 kinds of animals. There are more than 30 rare and protected animals including white headed and Indo-Chinese black langurs, crested striped hornbills, pangolins, and clouded leopards. 1/4 of China's wild animal species can be found in Chongzuo.

== Tourism ==
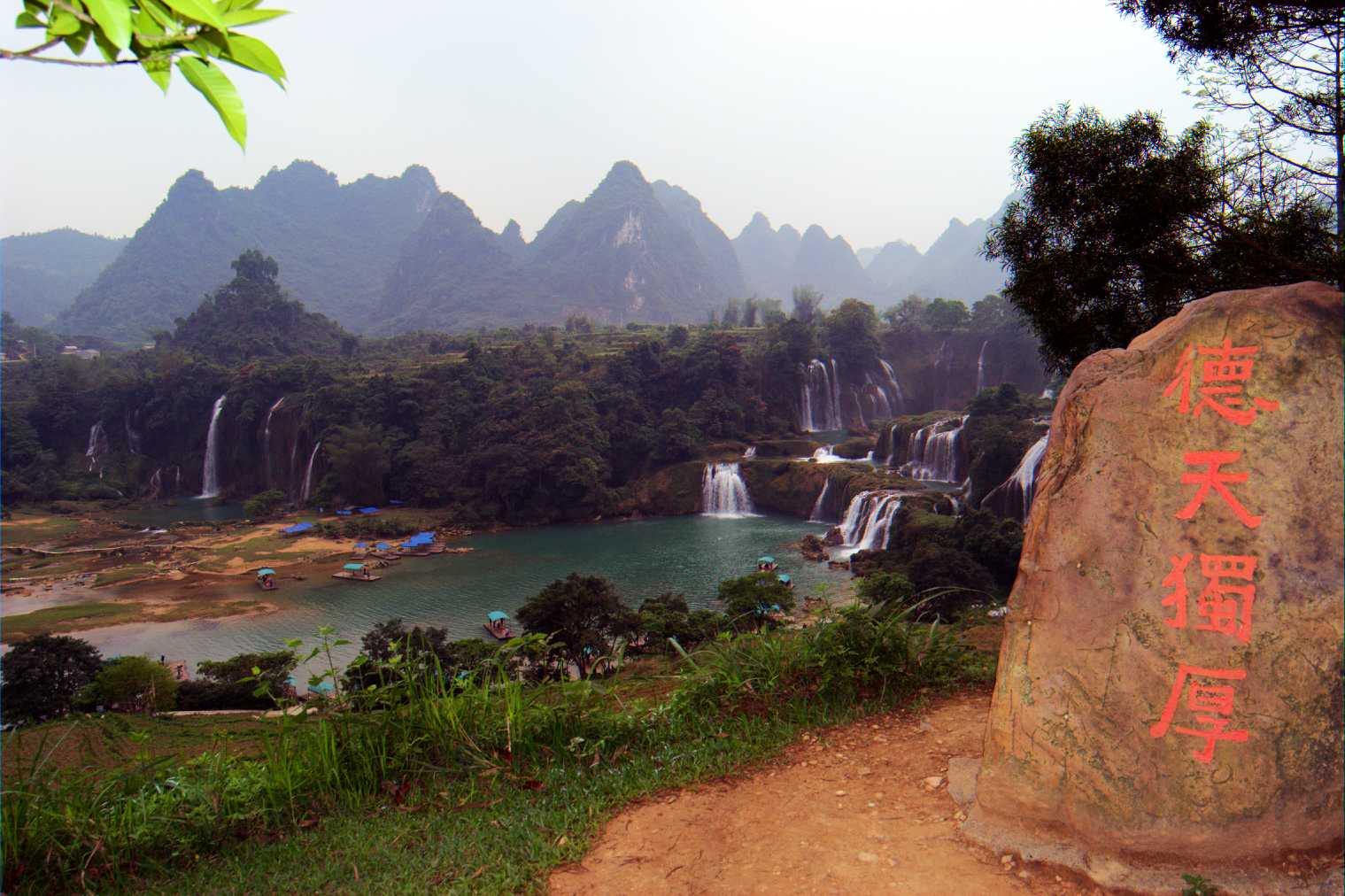
View from the Guangxi side in the dry season. Banyue fall is on the left. Detian is on the right

Chongzuo is famous for its natural scenery. The most famous attraction is Detian Waterfall in Daxing County along the border with Vietnam. It is the second largest waterfall along a national border after Niagara Falls and was one of the crossing points for China's army during the brief Sino-Vietnamese War. Nearby there is the Tongling Gorge accessible only through a cavern from an adjoining gorge. Rediscovered only recently, it has many species of endemic plants, found only in the gorge, and used to be used as a hideout by local bandits whose treasure is occasionally still found in the cliff-side caves. West of Chongzuo city, there are several forest and animal preserves, some with minor tourist facilities.

== Zhirendong ==
These findings might give some support to the claim that modern humans from Africa arrived at southern China about 100,000 years BP (Zhiren Cave, Mulanshan), Chongzuo City: 100,000 years BP; and the Liujiang hominid: controversially dated at 139,000–111,000 years BP).

== Notable people ==
- Tan Haoming (1871–1925) - a member of the Old Guangxi Clique, born in Chongzuo Longzhou County, Zhuang.
- Huang Xianfan (1899–1982) - a Chinese historian, ethnologist and educator, born in Chongzuo Fusui County, Zhuang.

== See also ==
- Detian – Ban Gioc Falls
