= Red Yao people =

Ethnic group

红瑶
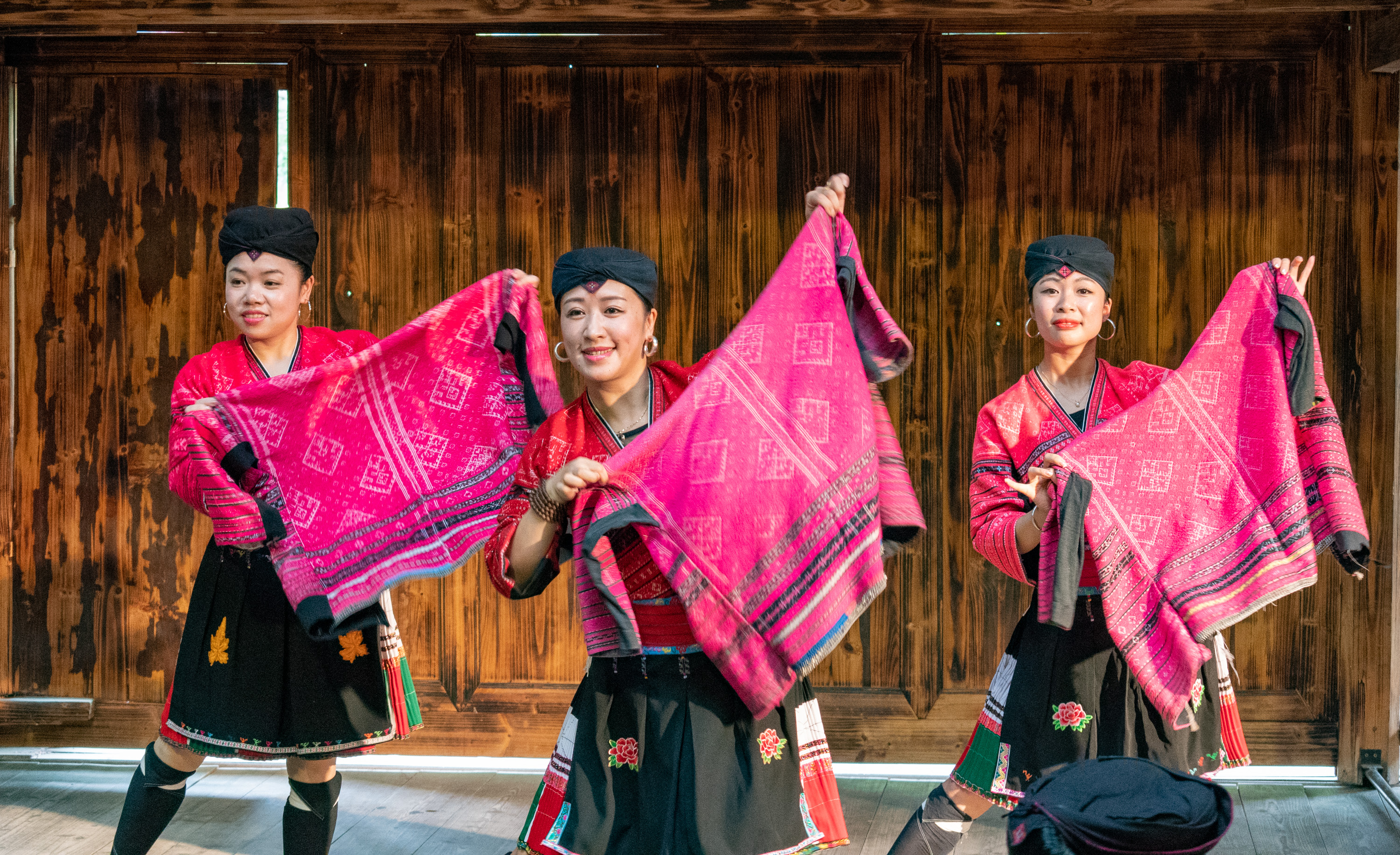
- Red Yao women in Longji, Guangxi

Total population
- About 15,000

Languages
- Younuo language, Pa-Hng, Younian dialect, Mandarin Chinese, Southwestern Mandarin

Related ethnic groups
- Yao people

Red Yao people
- Chinese: 红瑶
Transcriptions
Standard Mandarin
- Hanyu Pinyin: Hóngyáo
Yue: Cantonese
- Jyutping: hung4 jiu4

The Red Yao people (simplified Chinese: 红瑶; traditional Chinese: 紅瑤; pinyin: Hóngyáo) are a branch of the Yao people in China. They mostly live in Longsheng Various Nationalities Autonomous County and Lingui District in Guilin, Guangxi Zhuang Autonomous Region.

== Terminology ==
This branch of the Yao people is named Red Yao (Chinese: 红瑶; pinyin: Hóngyáo) due to their preference for red clothing. Their self-designation is "Younuo" (Chinese: 优诺; pinyin: Yōunuò) or "Younian" (Chinese: 优念; pinyin: Yōuniàn), in reference to the Younuo language they speak.

== Ethnic history and language ==
The language of the Red Yao is complex and diverse. Based on differences in their native language and geographic distribution, the Red Yao can be divided into two main branches. Those primarily residing in mountainous townships such as Longji, Sishui Township and Madi Township, who speak the Younuo language, are known as Mountain Dialect Red Yao (Chinese: 山话红瑶; pinyin: Shānhuà hóngyáo), with a population of approximately 4,600.

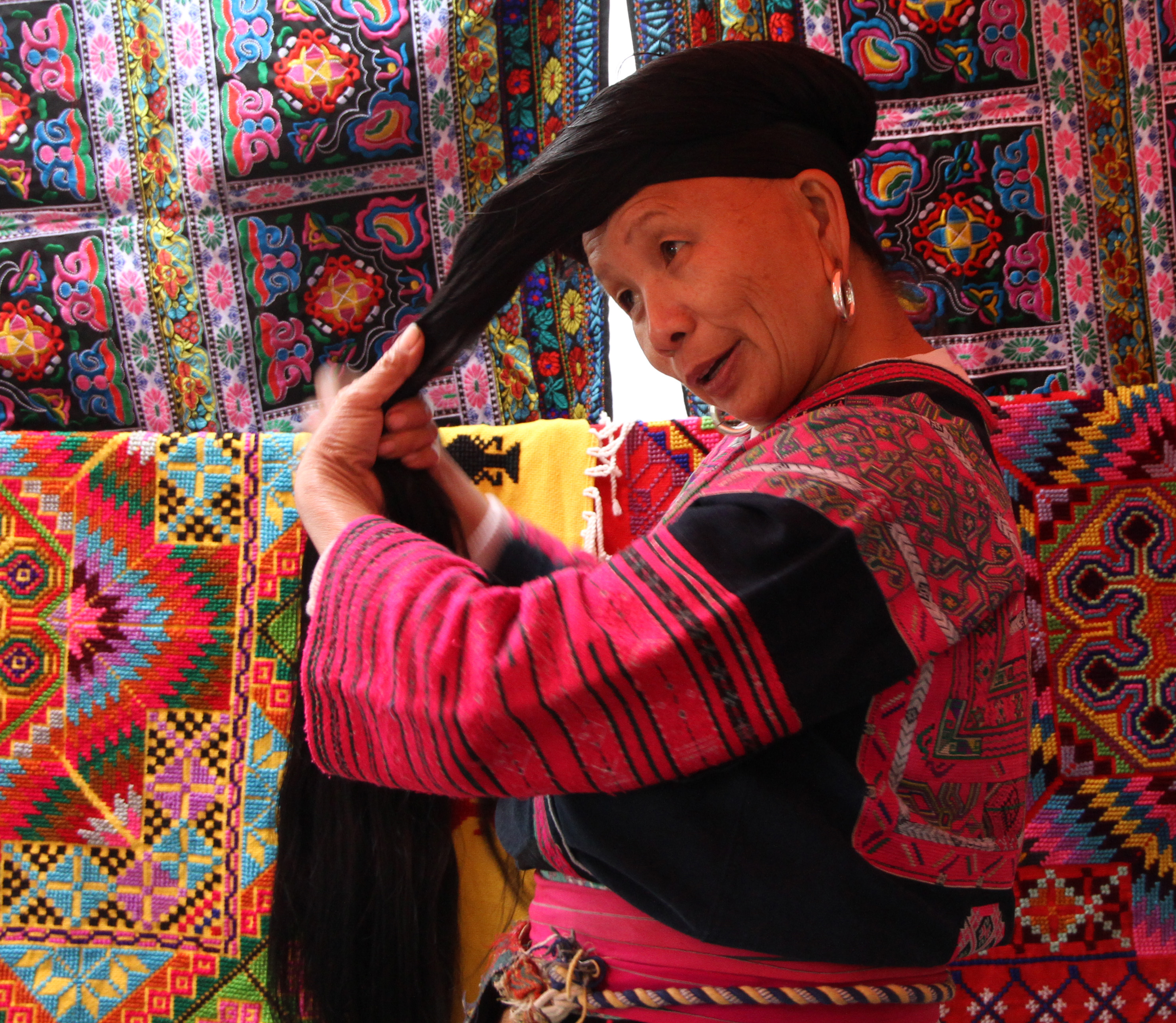
A Red Yao woman shows her long hair

Those mainly living in the plains, speaking a Chinese dialect called Younian Dialect, are referred to as Plain Dialect Red Yao (Chinese: 平话红瑶; pinyin: Pínghuà hóngyáo), with a population exceeding 10,000. Despite significant linguistic differences between the two branches, their lifestyles, customs, religious beliefs, and clothing are similar. Although mutual communication in their native languages is challenging, both Mountain Dialect and Plain Dialect Red Yao consider each other as part of the same ethnic group, sharing a common ethnic identity. Most Red Yao are bilingual and proficient in languages such as Guilin-Liuzhou dialect and Standard Mandarin.

Similar to other Pinghua ethnic groups, the Red Yao believe their ancestors originated from Qingzhou in Shandong. According to their legend, due to oppression, they left Qingzhou and split into several groups, wandering for centuries. After six or seven hundred years of separation, two groups reunited in places like Yining County and Longsheng in Guangxi. Linguist Mao Zongwu suggests that the highly similar customs, legends, and numerous shared cognates in the linguistic substratum of both the Red Yao branches indicate a common origin. The linguistic differences, he argues, resulted from prolonged migrations and the integration of Han Chinese populations.

Some sources also classify the Eight Surnames Yao (Chinese: 八姓瑶; pinyin: Bāxìng Yáo) as a branch of the Red Yao. The Eight Surnames Yao primarily speak languages from the Miao branch, such as Pa-Hng and Hm Nai, and are recognized as a distinct ethnic group, the Pà Thẻn people, in Vietnam.

== Folklore and culture ==
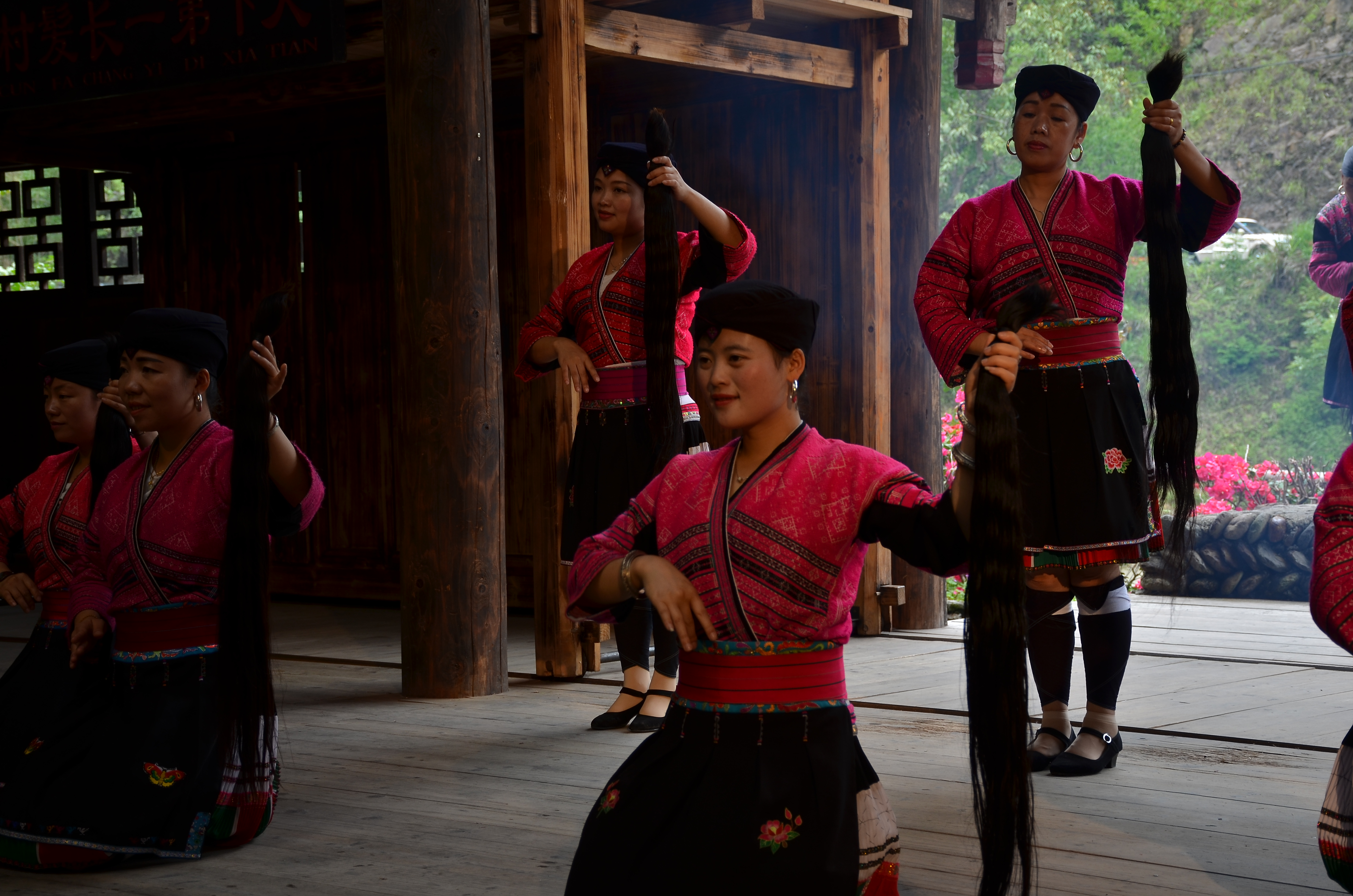
Red Yao women in Longji, participating in the long hair dance

In terms of clothing, the Red Yao revere the color red, which they consider a symbol of prosperity and joy. Women often wear vibrant tops dominated by red hues, a practice that has given the Red Yao their name. The most cherished garment in Red Yao attire is the "flower dress", a piece of intricate craftsmanship that takes approximately a year to complete. Red Yao women also have a tradition of wearing earrings, with silver earrings customarily worn by girls starting from the age of seven or eight.

The Lunar New Year is the most significant festival for the Red Yao. In Ximen Village in Longsheng, the Red Yao slaughter pigs on the 27th day of the twelfth lunar month. Unlike other regions, they perform this ritual under the ancestral tablets in the main hall as a gesture of filial piety and to seek blessings from their ancestors. On Lunar New Year's eve, the Red Yao practice a custom called "carrying the dog to pay New Year's respects", where a village places a puppy in a basket and visits neighboring villages to bring good fortune. During the Lunar New Year, the Red Yao of Huangluo Village also host banquets for their elders, who recite ancient songs and narrate ethnic stories. However, with economic development, many of these traditions are gradually fading.

The Red Yao have a longstanding tradition of keeping long hair, which they regard as a symbol of beauty. In their legends, hair is considered "a transformation of blood and vitality" and must not be cut carelessly. Traditionally, Red Yao women cut their hair only at the ages of three and eighteen, and the cut hair is preserved. As adults, Red Yao women's hair reaches an average length of 1.7 meters (5 ft 7 in). In 2002, Huangluo Village in the Longji, Longsheng County was certified by the Shanghai Guinness Records as having the "longest collective hair". In 2023, the village broke the record again when 250 Red Yao women came together to create the longest hair combing chain. Long hair has also become a tourist attraction in Longsheng's Red Yao communities.
