= Longji =

Longji Town 龙脊镇
- Town
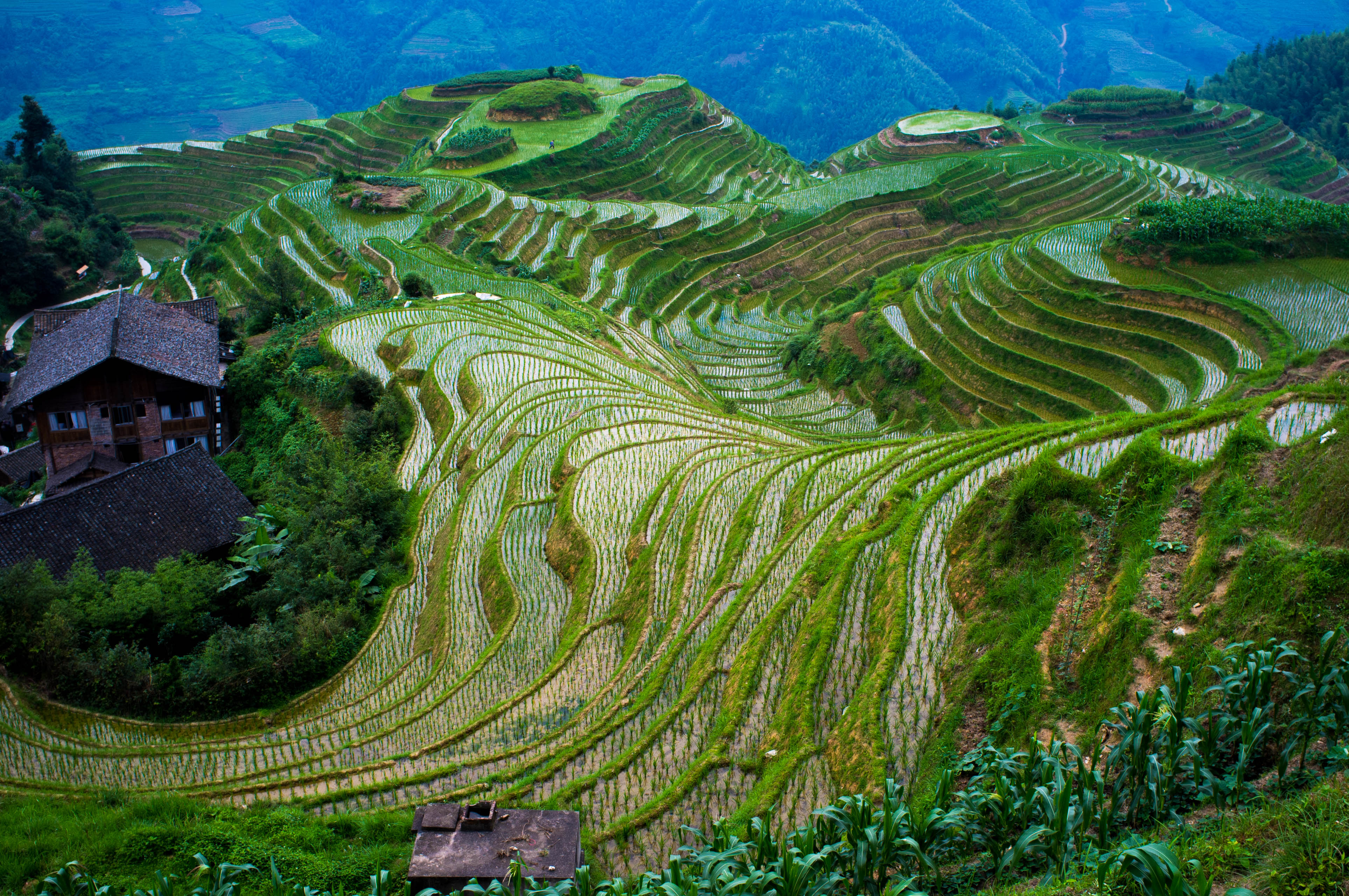
- Longji Rice Terraces.

- Location in Guangxi
- Coordinates: 25°43′54″N 110°03′47″E
- Country: China
- Autonomous region: Guangxi
- Prefecture: Guilin
- Autonomous county: Longsheng Various Nationalities Autonomous County

Area
  - Total: 273.34 km^{2} (105.54 sq mi)

Population (2018)
  - Total: 16,000
  - Density: 59/km^{2} (150/sq mi)
- Time zone: UTC+08:00 (China Standard)
- Postal code: 541701
- Area code: 0773

Longji (simplified Chinese: 龙脊镇; traditional Chinese: 龍脊鎮; pinyin: Lóngjí Zhèn) is a town in Longsheng Various Nationalities Autonomous County, Guangxi, China. As of the 2018 census it had a population of 16,000 and an area of 273.34-square-kilometre (105.54 sq mi). Longji is known worldwide for Longsheng Rice Terraces.

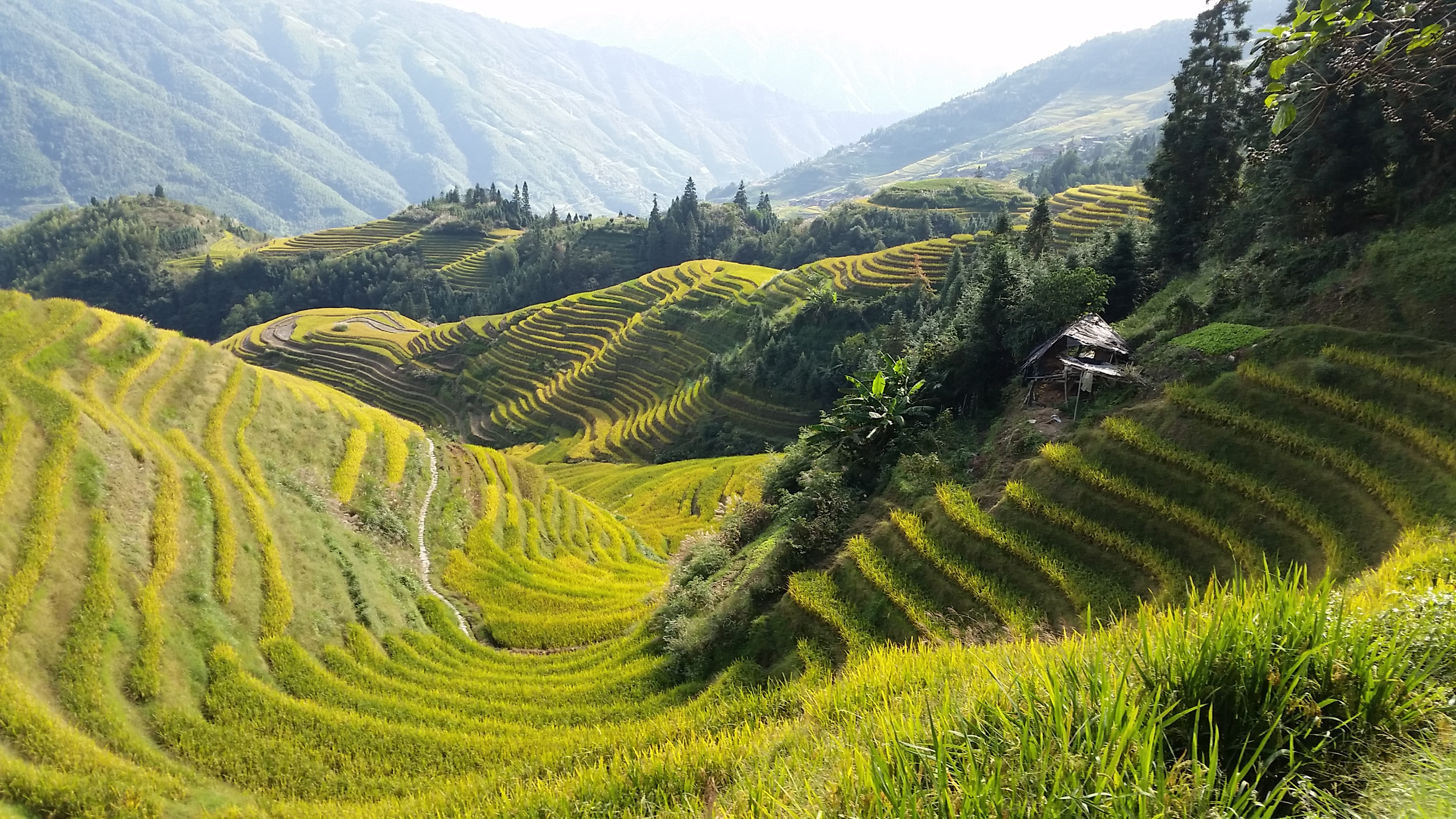

== Administrative division ==
As of 2016, the town is divided into fifteen villages and one community:

- Heping Community (和平社区)
- Heping (和平村)
- Daliu (大柳村)
- Baishui (白水村)
- Yueqiao (岳武村)
- Bailing (摆岭村)
- Baishi (白石村)
- Jinjiang (金江村)
- Longji (龙脊村)
- Ping'an (平安村)
- Huangjiang (黄江村)
- Mahai (马海村)
- Zhongliu (中六村)
- Dazhai (大寨村)
- Xiaozhai (小寨村)
- Jiangliu (江柳村)

== History ==
Longji came under the jurisdiction of Yining County (义宁县) in the Qing dynasty (1644–1911).

In 1916, it belonged to the South District (南区). In 1933, it was under the jurisdiction of Zhennan Township (镇南乡).

It known as Guanya Township (官衙乡) in May 1952 and renamed "Heping Township" on December 26 of that same year. On August 30, 1958, Heping Commune was founded and was revoked in August 1984. On January 2, 2014, it was upgraded to a town.

== Geography ==
The town is situated at southeastern Longsheng Various Nationalities Autonomous County. The town is bordered to the north by Sishui Township, to the northeast by Jiangdi Township, to the south by Lingui District. to the southeast by Lingchuan County, and to the west by Longsheng Town.

The highest point in the town is Fupingbao (Chinese: 福平包) which stands 1,916.4 metres (6,287 ft) above sea level. The lowest point is Lipai (Chinese: 里排), which, at 238 metres (781 ft) above sea level.

The Heping Stream (和平河), a tributary of the Xun River, winds through the town.

== Economy ==
Tourism is a significant part of the economy. The region abounds with gold.

== Tourist attractions ==
The Longsheng Rice Terraces is a famous scenic spot in China.

== Transportation ==
The China National Highway 321, commonly referred to as "G321", is a north–south highway passing through the town.

The G65 Baotou–Maoming Expressway, more commonly known as "Bao-Mao Expressway", runs north to south of the town.

== Gallery ==
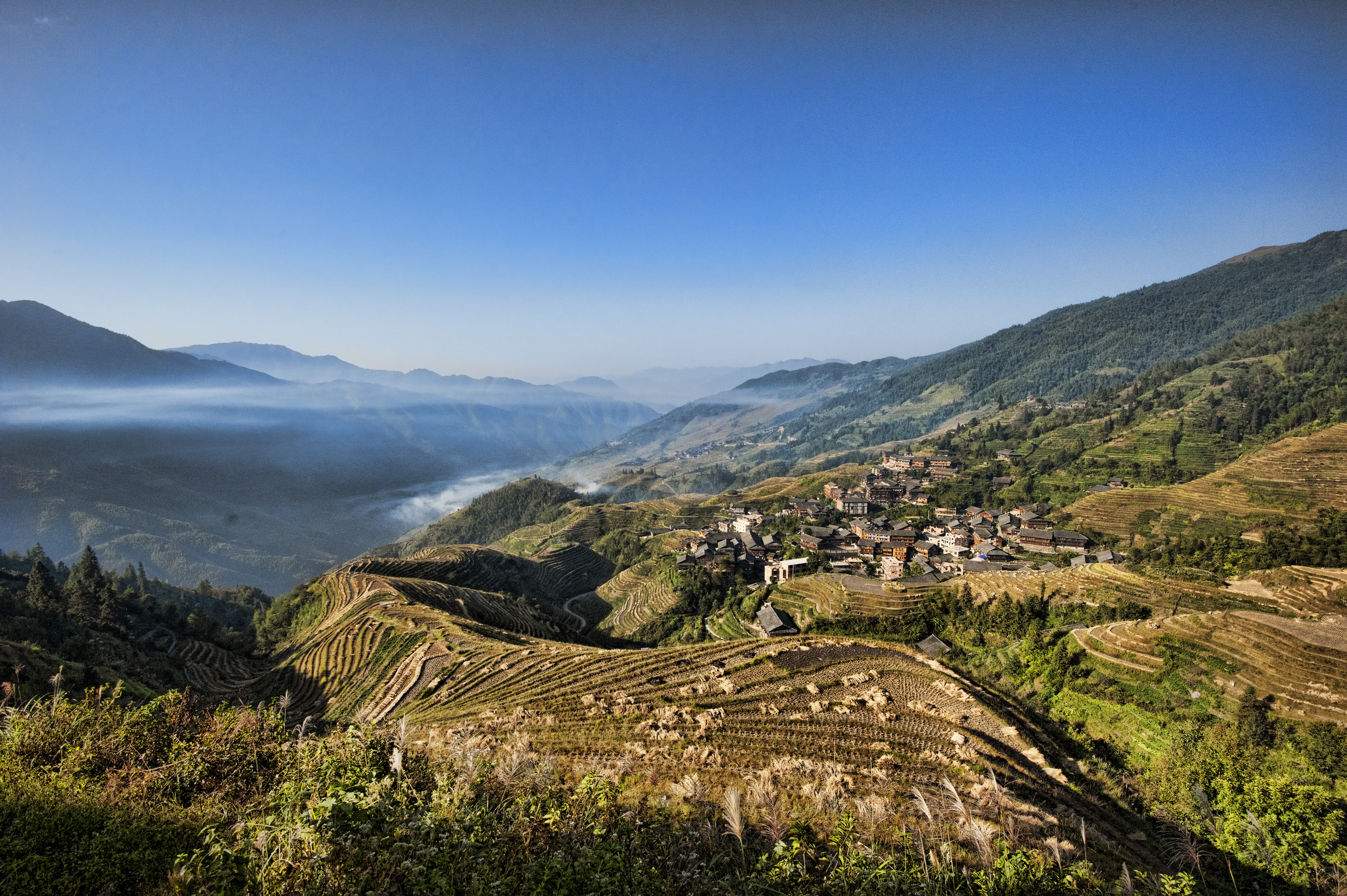
Longsheng Rice Terraces

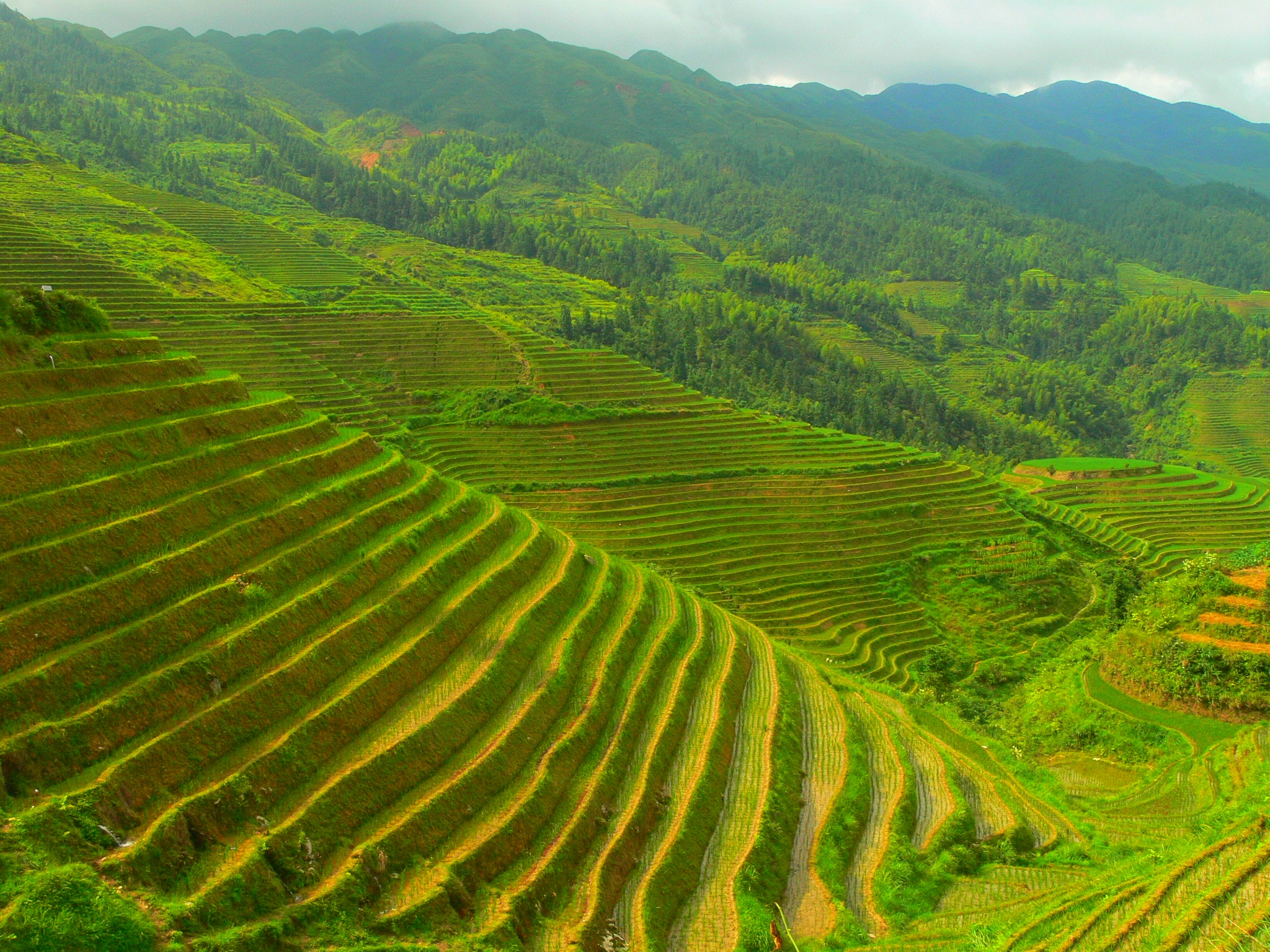
Longsheng Rice Terraces

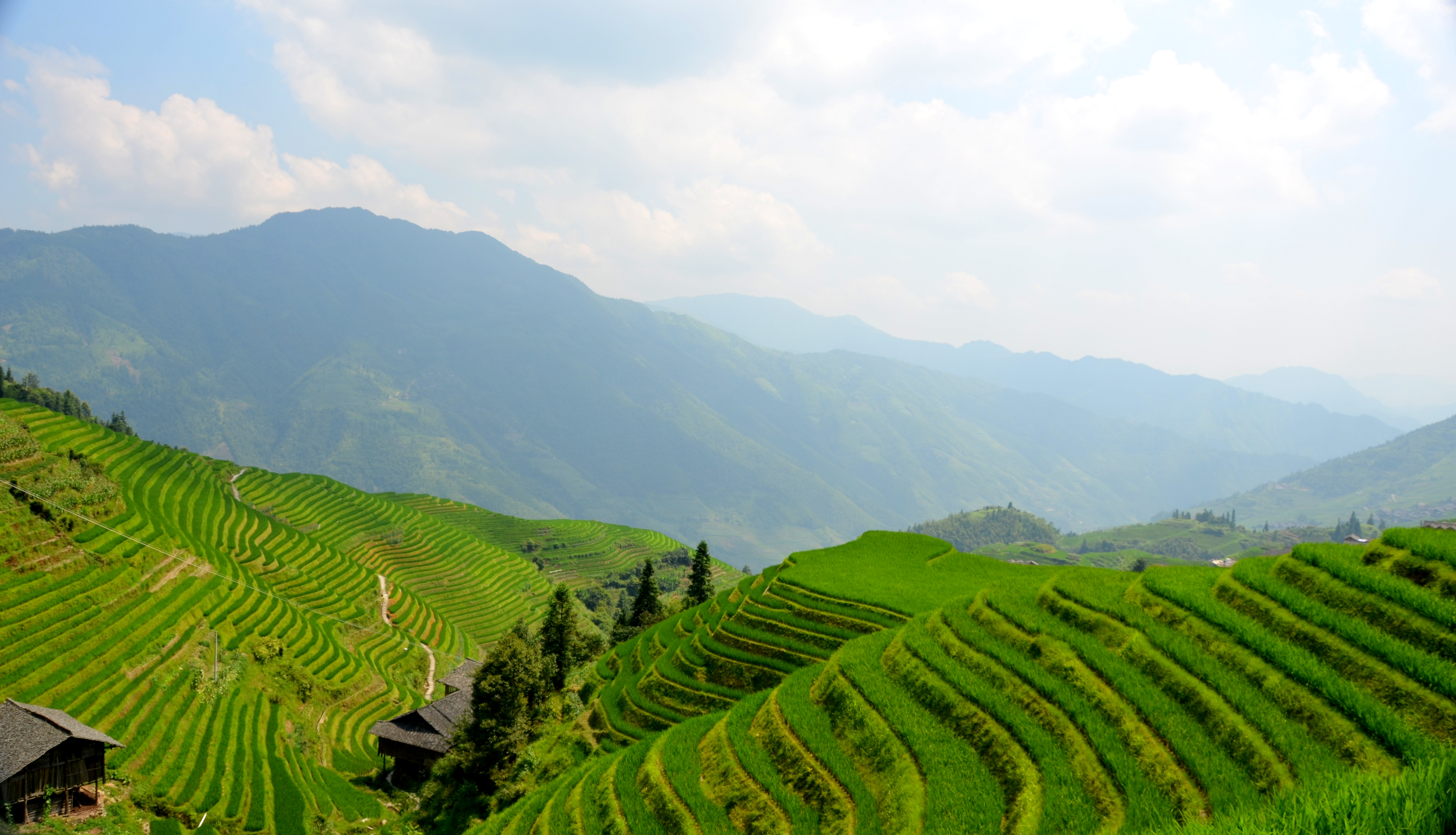
Longsheng Rice Terraces

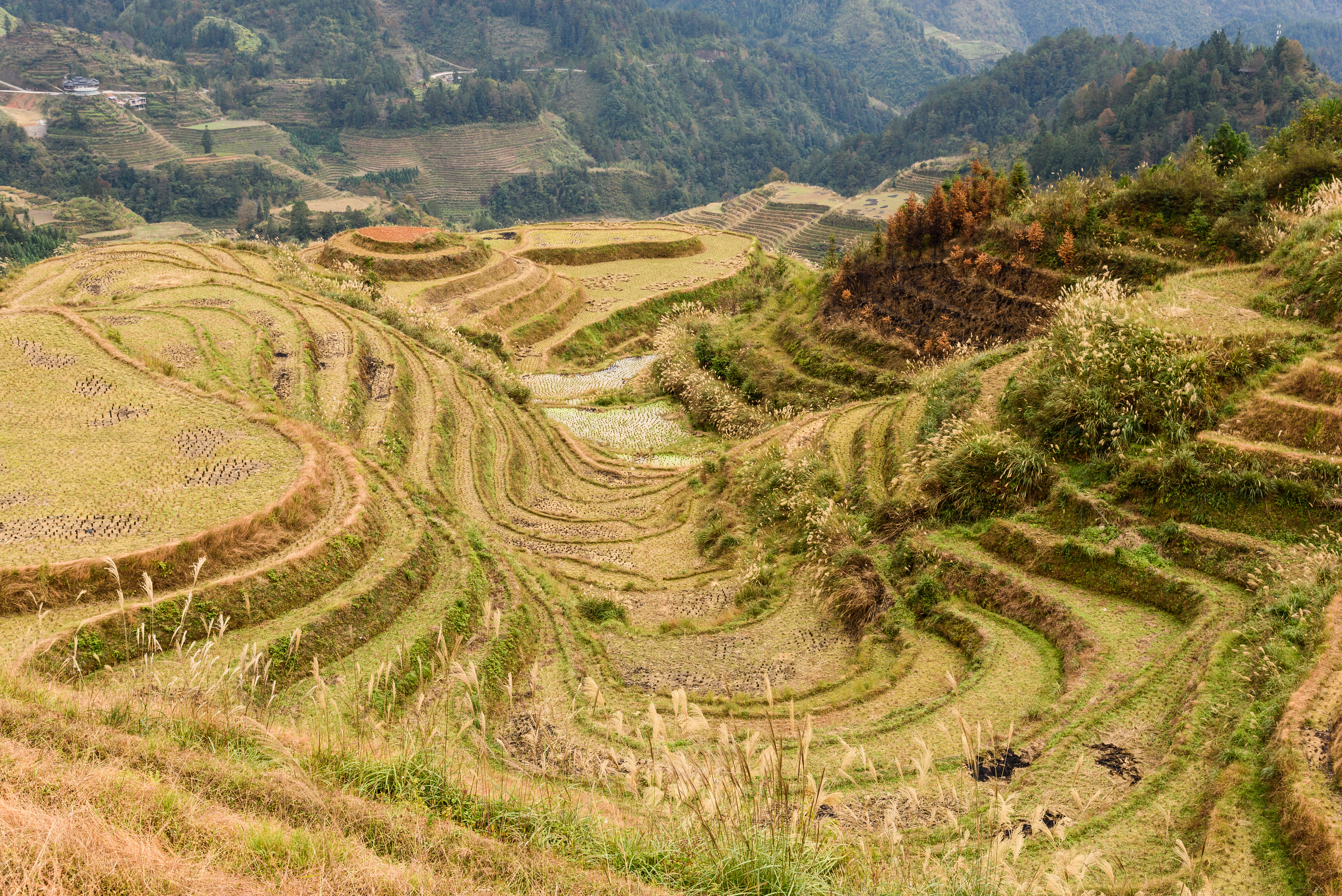
Longsheng Rice Terraces in November 2017.
