= Longsheng =

Longsheng, may refer to:

- Longsheng Various Nationalities Autonomous County, an autonomous county in Guangxi, China
- Longsheng, Guangxi, a town in Longsheng Various Nationalities Autonomous County, Guangxi, China
- Longsheng, Guangdong, a town in Kaiping, Guangdong, China
