= Younian dialect =

Chinese Pinghua dialect spoken in Guangxi

Younian
- Native to: China
- Region: 广西壮族自治区 Longsheng County
- Ethnicity: Red Yao
- Native speakers: (about <10000 cited 1997)
- Language family: Sino-Tibetan: Sinitic; Chinese; Pinghua; Northern Pinghua; Younian

Language codes
- ISO 639-3: –
- Linguasphere: 79-AAA-pcd

The Younian (Chinese: 优念话; pinyin: Yōuniànhuà) is a dialect of Northern Pinghua spoken in northern Guangxi. It is spoken by ethnic Red Yao people in Longsheng County, Guilin, Guangxi province. There were more than 10,000 native speakers in 1997. It has been documented in detail by Ouyang (2010).

== Phonology ==
=== Initials ===
Different towns in Longsheng have different inventories of consonants, differing from 18 in Pannei township to more than 20 in Heping and Mati townships. The characters in this table are based on Heping township's dialect.

Younian Dialect Initials
		Labial	Alveolar		Alveolo-Palatal (Note: Absent in the dialect of Pannei township.)	Palatal	Velar	Glottal
		Labial	plain	sibilant	Alveolo-Palatal	Palatal	Velar	Glottal
Nasal		m 麦问米木	n 脑年南泥		ȵ 热蛾那燃	ɲ (Note: Only found in the Pannei dialect.)	ŋ 月安岸岩	
Plosive/ Affricate	voiceless	p 八兵爬牌	t 多甜早桃	ts 租竹主装	tɕ 张纸争齐		k 高击姜劲	
Plosive/ Affricate	aspirated	pʰ (Note: Not present in Mati township dialect.) 派劈拼片	tʰ 讨天刺字	tsʰ 茶柱抄春	tɕʰ 拆车棋渠		kʰ 权开庆轻	
Continuant	voiceless	f 副饭飞灰	ɬ (Note: This sound is also transcribed as /l̥/) 丝三酸想	s 船山床县	ɕ 响凶形惜		x好获形合	h
Continuant	voiced	v王黄放用	l 绿乱来烂			j (Note: /j/ is an allophone of the zero initial in Mati and Heping township dialects, or of /i/ after the zero initial.)		
Zero initial		∅ 云荣劲益						

- Heping has /x/ but no /h/, Pannei has /h/ but no /x/, and Mati has both.

=== Finals ===
Heping Township Finals
		i-	u-	y-
∅		i 哪支眉芝	u 徒猪浮富	y 写舒殊吕
a	a 巴花夹杂	ia 爷客沾孩	ua 瓜瓦滑画	
o	o 他哭可竹	io 药肉六薄		
e	e 雪特力角	ie 者接业热	ue 决坑坑	ye 月阅绝
u		iu 椒表苗尿		
ai	ai 大牙台累		uai 坏怀快块	
ei	ei 碎米细泥		uei 杯税每类	
i			ui 火劈斧	
au	au 桃豆酒猴	iau		
eu	eu 多坐告稍	ieu九疗休柔		
an	an 三斩犯懒	ian茎银烟仍	uan含敢汗岸	yan 愿援远泉
en	en根尊针跟	in尖严点钱	uen 全砖船文	yin 元原券权
aŋ	aŋ帮讲康冈	iaŋ让向江争	uaŋ 创状壮撞	
eŋ	eŋ 朋肯恒晴		oŋ 东葱风东	ioŋ 梁张箱唱
ŋ	ŋ̍ 五午无			
