= Sanmen =

Sanmen, may refer to:

- Sanmen County, a county in Taizhou, Zhejiang, China.
- Sanmen, Longsheng County, a town in Longsheng Various Nationalities Autonomous County, Guangxi, China.
