= Sishui Township =

Sishui Township 泗水乡
- Township
- Location in Guangxi
- Coordinates: 25°51′37″N 110°05′20″E
- Country: China
- Autonomous region: Guangxi
- Prefecture: Guilin
- Autonomous county: Longsheng Various Nationalities Autonomous County

Area
  - Total: 167.8 km^{2} (64.8 sq mi)

Population (2018)
  - Total: 13,000
  - Density: 77/km^{2} (200/sq mi)
- Time zone: UTC+08:00 (China Standard)
- Postal code: 541707
- Area code: 0773

Sishui Township (simplified Chinese: 泗水乡; traditional Chinese: 泗水鄉; pinyin: Sìshuǐ Xiāng) is a township in Longsheng Various Nationalities Autonomous County, Guangxi, China. As of the 2018 census it had a population of 13,000 and an area of 167.8-square-kilometre (64.8 sq mi).

== Etymology ==
The name "Sishui" is named after the intersection of four streams, namely Zhailong Stream (寨陇溪), Yandi Stream (岩底溪), Pannei Stream (潘内溪) and Yitan Stream (沂潭溪).

== Administrative division ==
As of 2016, the township is divided into nine villages:

- Zhoujia (周家村)
- Ximen (细门村)
- Sanshe (三舍村)
- Batan (八滩村)
- Sishui (泗水村)
- Pannei (潘内村)
- Maluo (马骆村)
- Licha (里茶村)
- Licai (里才村)

== History ==
In the Qing dynasty (1644–1911), it belonged to the Dongtuan (东团) .

It was incorporated as a township in 1933.

After the founding of the Communist State in 1949, it came under the jurisdiction of the East District (东区) and soon came under the jurisdiction of the First District (一区) in October 1952. The Sishui Commune was set up in May 1961. And its name was restored as Sishui Township in July of the following year.

On June 6, 2019, the villages of Pannei and Zhoujia was listed among the fifth group of "List of Traditional Villages in China" by the State Council of China.

== Geography ==
The township is situated at northeastern Longsheng Various Nationalities Autonomous County. It is surrounded by Madi Township and Weijiang Township on the north, Lejiang Town on the west, Jiangdi Township on the east, and Longsheng Town on the south.

The highest point in the township is Mount Fupingbao (Chinese: 福平包山) which stands 1,916 metres (6,286 ft) above sea level. The lowest point is Paifang (排坊) at 225 metres (738 ft) above sea level.

The Sang River (桑江), a tributary of the Xun River, passes through the town northeast to southwest.
