= Pingdeng =

Pingdeng Town 平等镇
- Town
- Location in Guangxi
- Coordinates: 26°03′23″N 109°55′26″E
- Country: China
- Autonomous region: Guangxi
- Prefecture: Guilin
- Autonomous county: Longsheng Various Nationalities Autonomous County

Area
  - Total: 365 km^{2} (141 sq mi)

Population (2018)
  - Total: 28,800
  - Density: 78.9/km^{2} (204/sq mi)
- Time zone: UTC+08:00 (China Standard)
- Postal code: 541000
- Area code: 0773

Pingdeng (simplified Chinese: 平等镇; traditional Chinese: 平等鎮; pinyin: Píngděng Zhèn) is a town in Longsheng Various Nationalities Autonomous County, Guangxi, China. As of the 2018 census it had a population of 28,800 and an area of 365-square-kilometre (141 sq mi).

== Administrative division ==
As of 2016, the town is divided into twenty-one villages and one community:

- Pingdeng Community (平等社区)
- Paotian (庖田村)
- Guangnan (广南村)
- Pingdeng (平等村)
- Longping (龙坪村)
- Banhe (半河村)
- Xinyuan (新元村)
- Gudong (固洞村)
- Mengdong (蒙洞村)
- Zhaizhen (寨枕村)
- Pingdeng (平定村)
- Yingzhou (硬州村)
- Luohan (罗汉村)
- Xiaojiang (小江村)
- Chengtian (城田村)
- Taiping (太坪村)
- Ping'an (平熬村)
- Jiahe (甲河村)
- Liuli (琉璃村)
- Dongshe (东社村)
- Changbei (昌背村)
- Longjiang (隆江村)

== History ==
The town was historically known as "Pengteng" in Kam language. It was named "Pingdeng" (平邓) in Chinese language. In early Republic of China, the Chinese character "邓", was changed to "等" of the same pronunciation.

In 2014 it was upgraded to a town.

== Geography ==
The town is situated at northwestern Longsheng Various Nationalities Autonomous County. The town is bordered to the north by Chengbu Miao Autonomous County, to the east by Weijiang Township, to the south by Lejiang Town, and to the west by Tongdao Dong Autonomous County.

The Xun River flows north to south through the town.

== Economy ==
The local economy is primarily based upon agriculture and local industry.
