= Weijiang Township =

Weijiang Township 伟江乡
- Township
- Location in Guangxi
- Coordinates: 26°00′20″N 110°05′23″E
- Country: China
- Autonomous region: Guangxi
- Prefecture: Guilin
- Autonomous county: Longsheng Various Nationalities Autonomous County

Area
  - Total: 170.6 km^{2} (65.9 sq mi)

Population (2018)
  - Total: 9,700
  - Density: 57/km^{2} (150/sq mi)
- Time zone: UTC+08:00 (China Standard)
- Postal code: 541710
- Area code: 0773

Weijiang Township (simplified Chinese: 伟江乡; traditional Chinese: 偉江鄉; pinyin: Wěijiāng Xiāng) is a township in Longsheng Various Nationalities Autonomous County, Guangxi, China. As of the 2018 census it had a population of 9,700 and an area of 170.6-square-kilometre (65.9 sq mi).

== Etymology ==
The name of "Weijiang" is named after Weijiang Stream, which flows through the township north to south.

== Administrative division ==
As of 2016, the township is divided into eight villages:

- Ganjia (甘甲村)
- Yangwan (洋湾村)
- Bunong (布弄村)
- Zhongdong (中洞村)
- Limu (里木村)
- Xinzhai (新寨村)
- Dawan (大湾村)
- Chonglin (崇林村)

== History ==
In 1933, it belonged to Madi Township.

It was incorporated as a township in November 1949 and was under the jurisdiction of the East District (东区). In May 1953 it was renamed "Bunong Township" (布弄乡) and came under the jurisdiction of the Third District (第三区). The Weijiang Commune was set up in May 1961.

On December 9, 2016, the village of Xinzhai was listed among the fourth group of "List of Traditional Villages in China" by the State Council of China. On June 6, 2019, the village of Yangwan was listed among the fifth group of "List of Traditional Villages in China" by the State Council of China.

== Geography ==
The township is situated at northwestern Longsheng Various Nationalities Autonomous County. The township is bordered to the north by Chengbu Miao Autonomous County, to the east by Madi Township, to the south by the towns of Lejiang and Longsheng, and to the west by the town of Pingdeng.

The Weijiang Stream (伟江河), a tributary of the Pingdeng River, flows through the township north to south.

== Economy ==
The local economy is primarily based upon agriculture and local industry.

== Tourist attractions ==
The main attraction is the Weijiang Rice Terraces (伟江梯田).

The Shunfeng Bridge (顺风桥), also known as "Red Army Bridge" (红军桥), is a provincial cultural relics protection unit.

The Pan Village Wind-rain Bridge (潘寨风雨桥), is the symbolized cultural landscape and architecture of the Miao people. It has a deep connotation of culture, philosophy and architecture art, it also contains plenty of ecological aesthetic implications.

The Xiabilin Waterfall (下碧林瀑布) is a famous scenic spot in the township.
