= Madi Township =

Madi Township 马堤乡
- Township
- Location in Guangxi
- Coordinates: 25°55′40″N 110°06′37″E
- Country: China
- Autonomous region: Guangxi
- Prefecture: Guilin
- Autonomous county: Longsheng Various Nationalities Autonomous County

Area
  - Total: 141.48 km^{2} (54.63 sq mi)
- Elevation: 600 m (2,000 ft)

Population (2018)
  - Total: 15,100
  - Density: 107/km^{2} (276/sq mi)
- Time zone: UTC+08:00 (China Standard)
- Postal code: 541708
- Area code: 0773

Madi Township (simplified Chinese: 马堤乡; traditional Chinese: 馬堤鄉; pinyin: Mǎdī Xiāng) is a township in Longsheng Various Nationalities Autonomous County, Guangxi, China. As of the 2018 census it had a population of 15,100 and an area of 141.48-square-kilometre (54.63 sq mi).

== Etymology ==
Madi Township, formerly known as "Mati Township" (马蹄乡; 'Horseshoe Township'), because a large stone like horseshoe in the township.

== Administrative division ==
As of 2016, the township is divided into eight villages:

- Madi (马堤村)
- Niutou (牛头村)
- Baiwan (百湾村)
- Zhangjia (张家村)
- Longjia (龙家村)
- Furong (芙蓉村)
- Lishi (里市村)
- Dongsheng (东升村)

== History ==
It was incorporated as a township in 1984.

== Geography ==
Madi Township is situated at northeastern Longsheng Various Nationalities Autonomous County. It borders Chengbu Miao Autonomous County in the north, Jiangdi Township in the east, Sishui Township in the south, and Weijiang Township in the west.

== Economy ==
The economy is supported primarily by farming and ranching.

== Transportation ==
The Provincial Highway S219 is a south-north highway in the town.
