= Sanmen, Longsheng County =

Sanmen Town 三门镇
- Town
- Location in Guangxi
- Coordinates: 25°43′52″N 109°51′49″E
- Country: China
- Autonomous region: Guangxi
- Prefecture: Guilin
- Autonomous county: Longsheng Various Nationalities Autonomous County

Area
  - Total: 327.88 km^{2} (126.60 sq mi)

Population (2018)
  - Total: 14,500
  - Density: 44.2/km^{2} (115/sq mi)
- Time zone: UTC+08:00 (China Standard)
- Postal code: 541703
- Area code: 0773

Sanmen (simplified Chinese: 三门镇; traditional Chinese: 三門鎮; pinyin: Sānmén Zhèn) is a town in Longsheng Various Nationalities Autonomous County, Guangxi, China. As of the 2018 census it had a population of 14,500 and an area of 327.88-square-kilometre (126.60 sq mi).

== Administrative division ==
As of 2016, the town is divided into thirteen villages and one community:

- Sanmenjie Community (三门街社区)
- Jiaoqi (交其村)
- Datan (大滩村)
- Hongzhai (洪寨村)
- Ankang (安康村)
- Shuanglang (双朗村)
- Shuangjiang (双江村)
- Jizhua (鸡爪村)
- Guping (古坪村)
- Tonglie (同列村)
- Daluo (大罗村)
- Huaqiao (花桥村)
- Dadi (大地村)
- Huaping (花坪村)

== History ==
In the Qing dynasty (1644–1911), it belonged to Xituan (西团).

In early Republic of China, it came under the jurisdiction of the West District (西区). Sanmen Township was formed in 1933. In 1947 it was under the jurisdiction of Guangfu Township (广福乡).

After the establishment of the Communist State, it was renamed many times. In December 1994 it was upgraded to a town.

On June 6, 2019, the villages of Daluo and Tonglie was listed among the fifth group of "List of Traditional Villages in China" by the State Council of China.

== Geography ==
The town is located in southwestern Longsheng Various Nationalities Autonomous County. The town shares a border with Sanjiang Dong Autonomous County to the west, Lingui District and Piaoli Town to the east, Piaoli Town and Longsheng Town to the north, and Yongfu County and Rong'an County to the south.

The Sanmen River (三门河) flows through the town.

== Economy ==
The region is rich in soapstone.

== Tourist attractions ==
The Huaping National Nature Reserve (花坪国家级自然保护区) is located in the town.
