= Longsheng, Guangxi =

Longsheng Town 龙胜镇
- Town
- Location in Guangxi
- Coordinates: 25°47′52″N 110°00′16″E
- Country: China
- Autonomous region: Guangxi
- Prefecture: Guilin
- Autonomous county: Longsheng Various Nationalities Autonomous County

Area
  - Total: 320 km^{2} (120 sq mi)

Population (2018)
  - Total: 37,000
  - Density: 120/km^{2} (300/sq mi)
- Time zone: UTC+08:00 (China Standard)
- Postal code: 541700
- Area code: 0773

Longsheng (simplified Chinese: 龙胜镇; traditional Chinese: 龍勝鎮; pinyin: Lóngshèng Zhèn) is a town in Longsheng Various Nationalities Autonomous County, Guangxi, China. As of 2018 it had a population of 37,000 and an area of 320-square-kilometre (120 sq mi).

== History ==
In 1742, Longsheng was formed as a city after the suppression of a rebellion led by Wu Jinyin (吴金银).

In 1945, it was known as "Rixin Street" (日新街).

After the establishment of the Communist State, its name was replaced by Rixin Town (日新镇) in 1958 and Chengguan Town (城关镇) in 1963. In February 1964, it was renamed "Longsheng Town Commune" (龙胜镇公社). In November 1979, its name was changed to "Longsheng Town".

== Geography ==
Longsheng is located in central Longsheng Various Nationalities Autonomous County. It is surrounded by Lejiang Town on the north, Sishui Township on the northeast, Piaoli Town on the west, Sanmen on the southwest, Longji Town on the southeast, and Lingui District on the south.

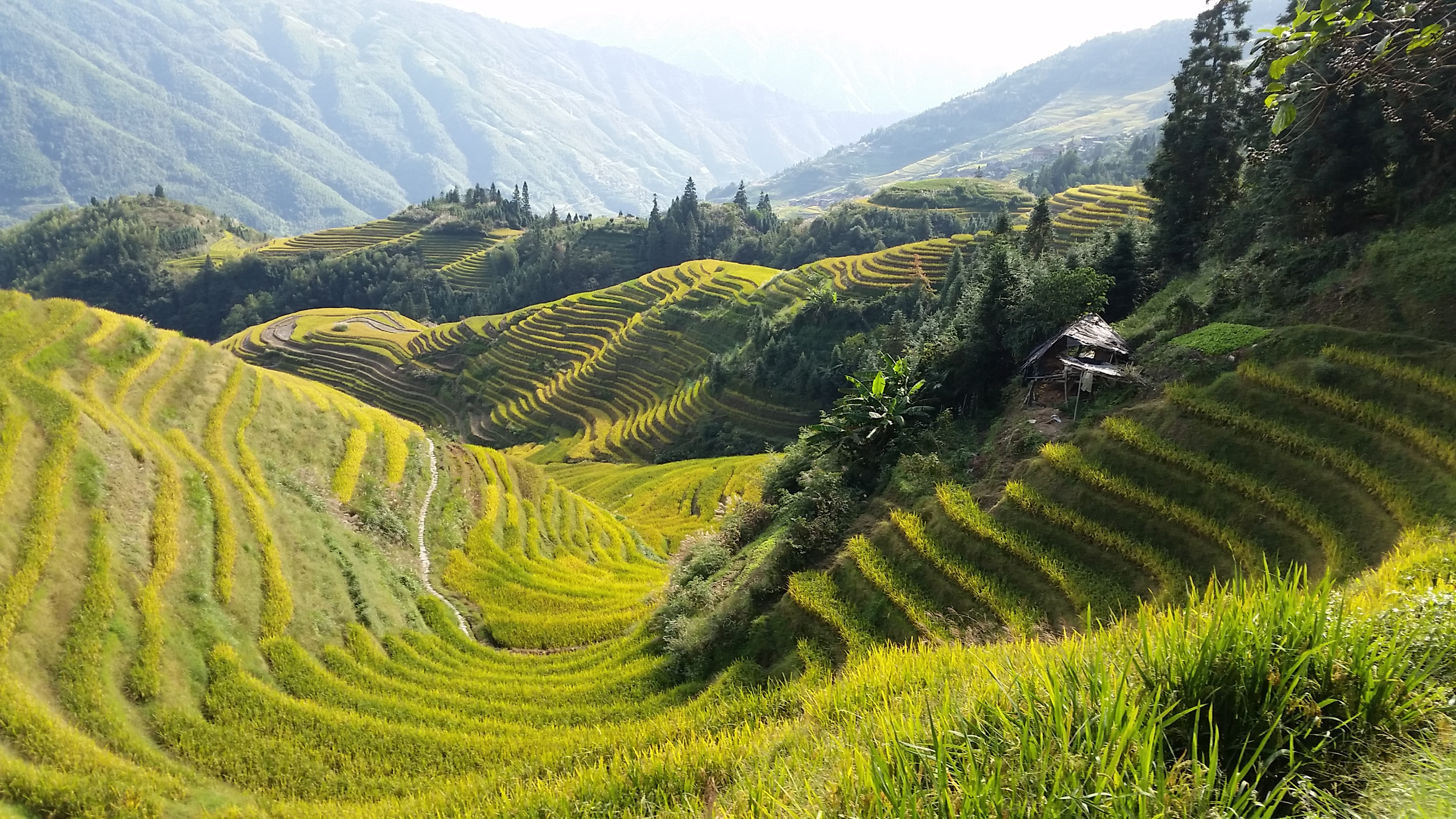
Ping'an paddy fields

The Xun River flows through the town west to northeast.

The Heping River (和平河) and Pingye River (平野河) run through the town.

The town enjoys a subtropical monsoon climate, with an average annual temperature of 18.1 °C (64.6 °F). The highest temperature is 26.8 °C (80.2 °F), and the lowest temperature is 7.7 °C (45.9 °F).

== Administrative divisions ==
As of 2020, the town is divided into 5 residential communities and 14 villages.

=== Residential communities ===
Longsheng administers the following 5 residential communities:

- Chengnan Community (Chinese: 城南社区)
- Chengbei Community (Chinese: 城北社区)
- Guilong Community (Chinese: 桂龙社区)
- Chengxi Community (Chinese: 城西社区)
- Bei'an Community (Chinese: 北岸社区)

=== Villages ===
Longsheng administers the following 14 villages:

- Chengguan (Chinese: 城关村)
- Shuanghe (Chinese: 双河村)
- Lehuang (Chinese: 勒黄村)
- Duping (Chinese: 都坪村)
- Pingye (Chinese: 平野村)
- Chonglou (Chinese: 崇楼村)
- Lingtian (Chinese: 岭田村)
- Shangmeng (Chinese: 上孟村)
- Jinche (Chinese: 金车村)
- Jinjie (Chinese: 金结村)
- Shuangdong (Chinese: 双洞村)
- Rixin (Chinese: 日新村)
- Shandong (Chinese: 山东村)
- Nanmen (Chinese: 南门村)

== Demographics ==
The village of Jinjie (Chinese: 金结村) and Shuangdong (Chinese: 双洞村) are home to a concentration of ethnic Zhuang people.

== Transportation ==
The China National Highway 321, commonly referred to as "G321", is a west-southeast highway passing through commercial and residential area west of the town limits.

The G65 Baotou–Maoming Expressway, more commonly known as "Bao-Mao Expressway", runs west to southeast of the town.
