= Longsheng Rice Terraces =

Agricultural area in Guangxi, China

Longji Rice Terraces
- Terraces
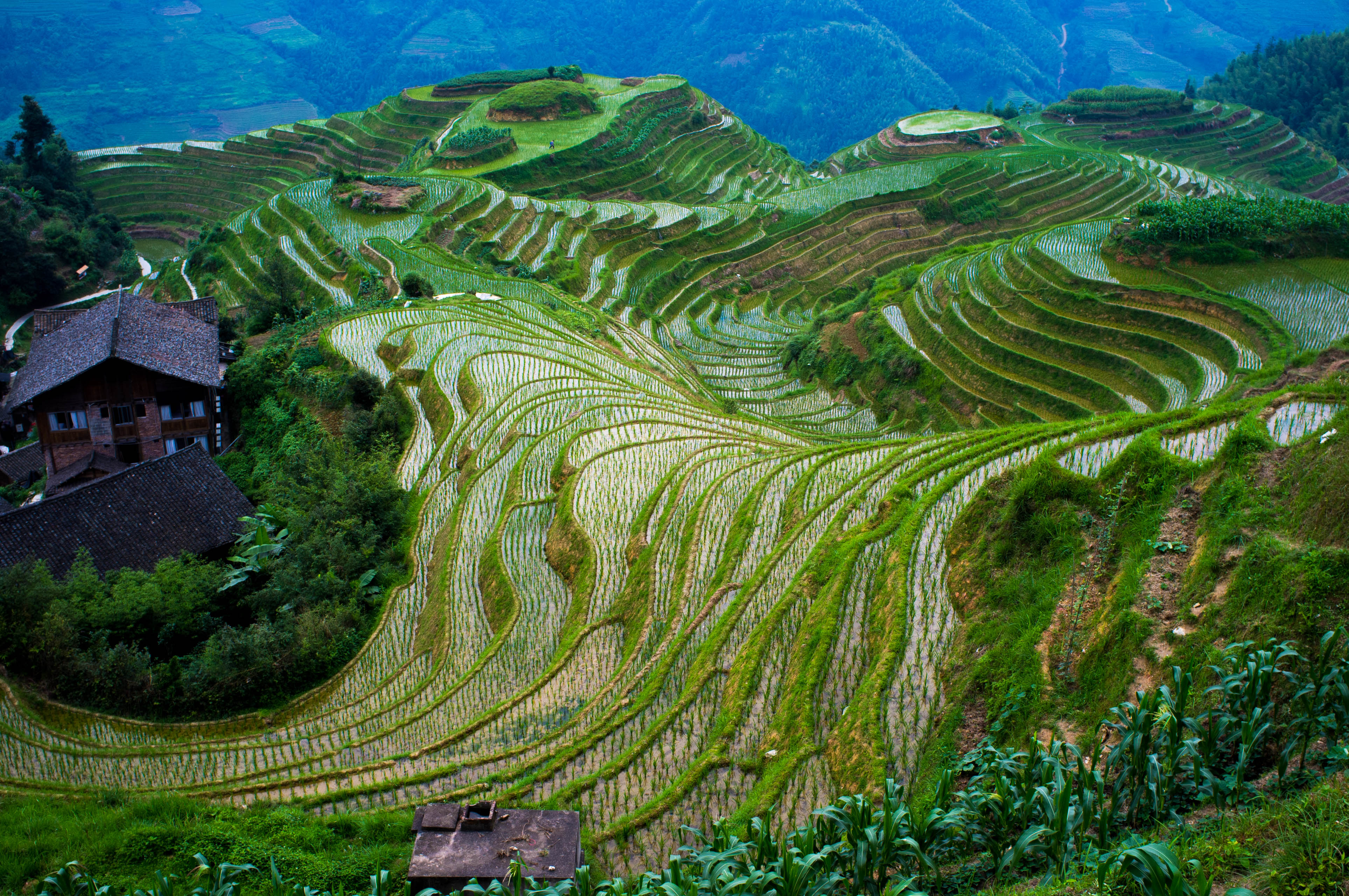
- Longsheng (Longji) Rice Terrace

- Location within Guangxi
- Coordinates: 25°45′N 110°8′E
- Location: Longji, Longsheng Various Nationalities Autonomous County, Guangxi, China

The Longji Rice Terraces ("Loong Dragon's Spine") (simplified Chinese: 龙脊梯田; traditional Chinese: 龍脊梯田; pinyin: lóngjǐ tītián), also called the Longsheng Rice Terraces ("Dragon's Victory") (simplified Chinese: 龙胜梯田; traditional Chinese: 龍勝梯田; pinyin: lóngshèng tītián), are located in the town of Longji in Longsheng Various Nationalities Autonomous County, about 100 kilometres (62 mi) from Guilin, China.

The terraced fields are built along the slope winding from the riverside up to the mountain top, between 600 and 800 metres (2,000 and 2,600 ft) above sea level. A coiling terrace line that starts from the mountain foot up to the mountain top divides the mountain into layers of water in spring, layers of green rice shoots in summer, layers of rice in fall, and layers of frost in winter. The terraced fields were mostly built about 650 years ago.

Longji Terraced Rice Fields received their name because the rice terraces resemble a loong dragon's scales, while the summit of the mountain range looks like the backbone of the dragon.

In early June, water is pumped over the rice paddies, and young plants are transferred to the main terraces.

== Gallery ==
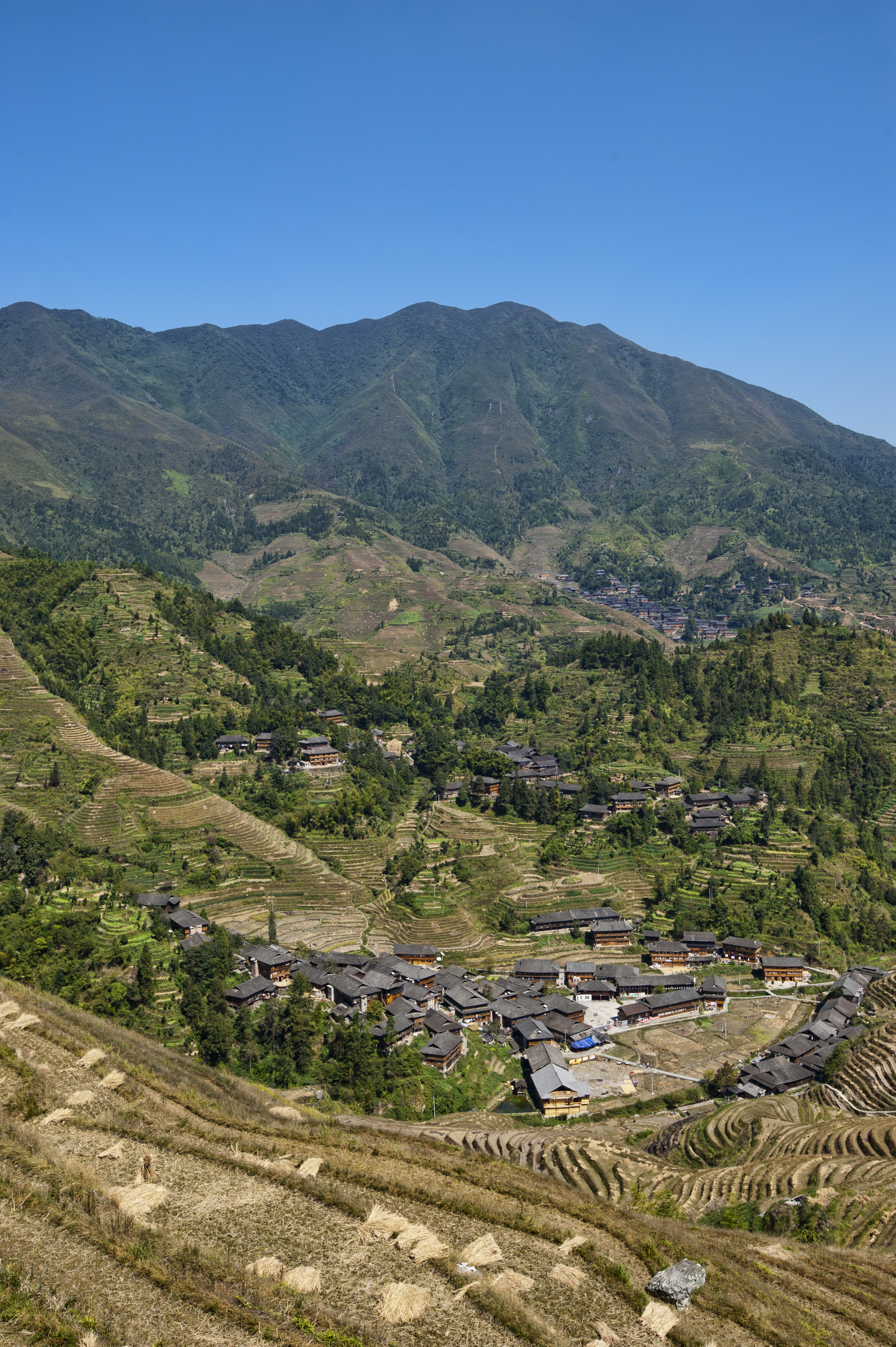
Dazhai rice terrace

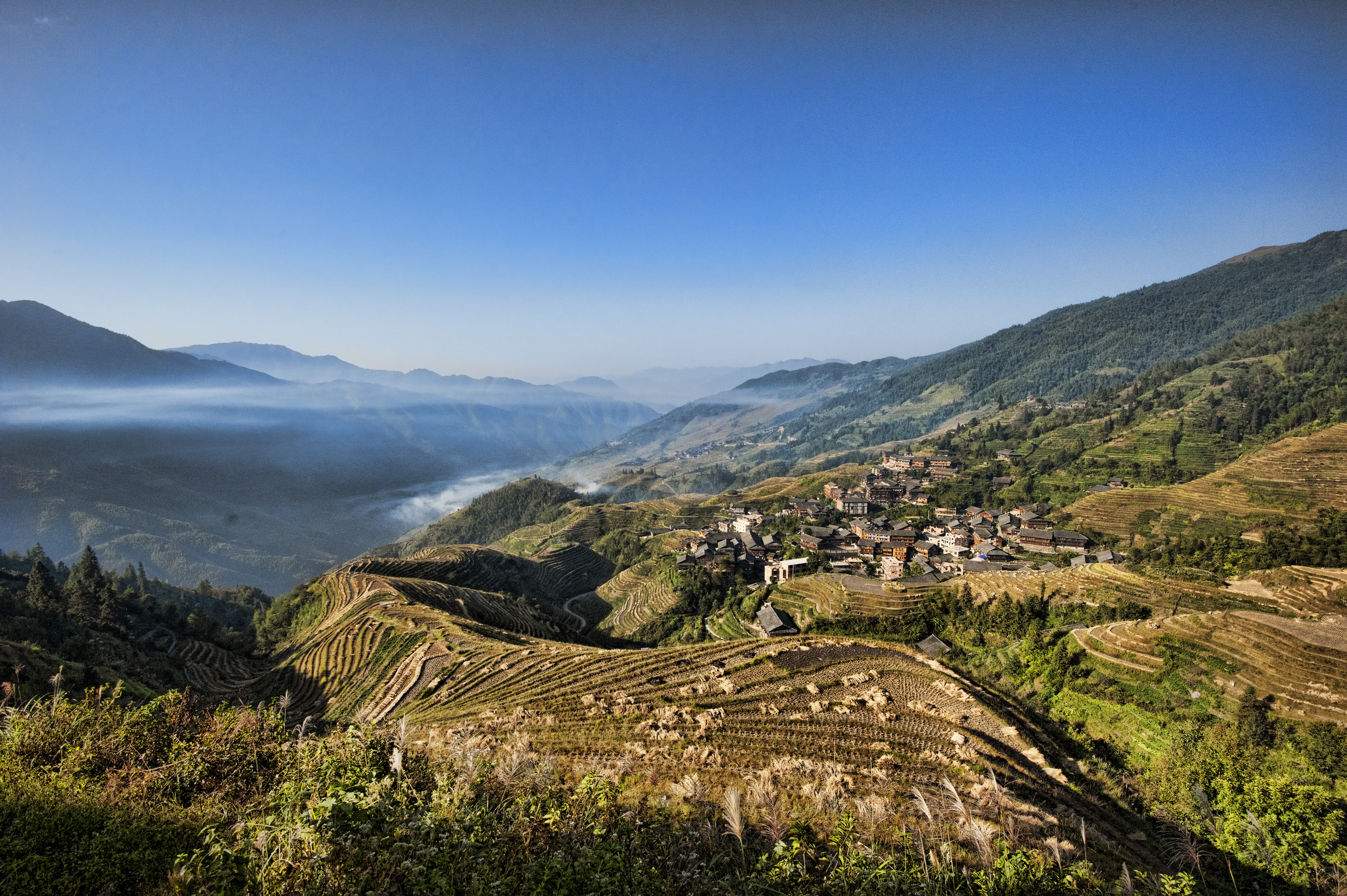
Ping'an as seen from Jiu long wu hu

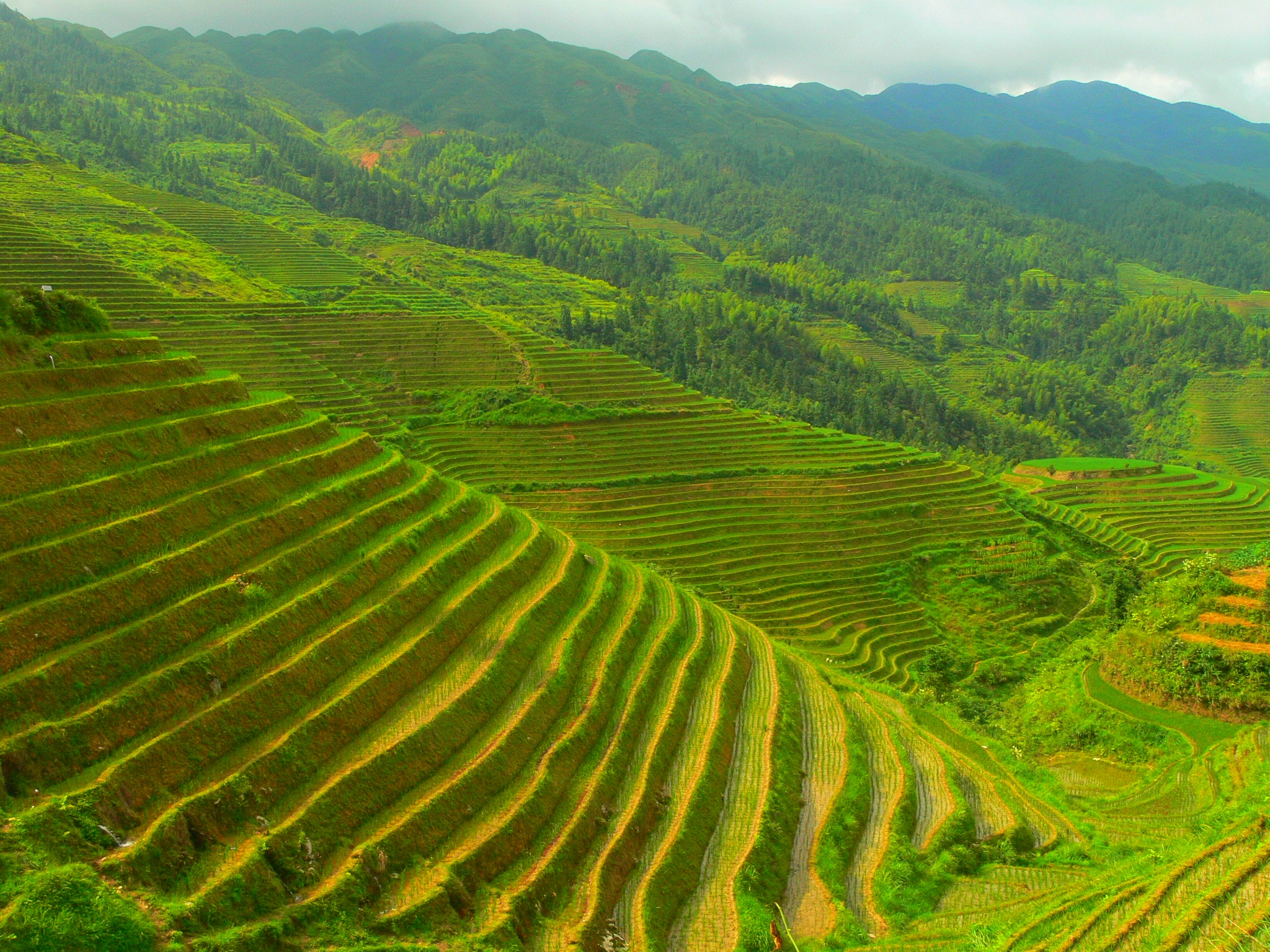
Longsheng rice terrace

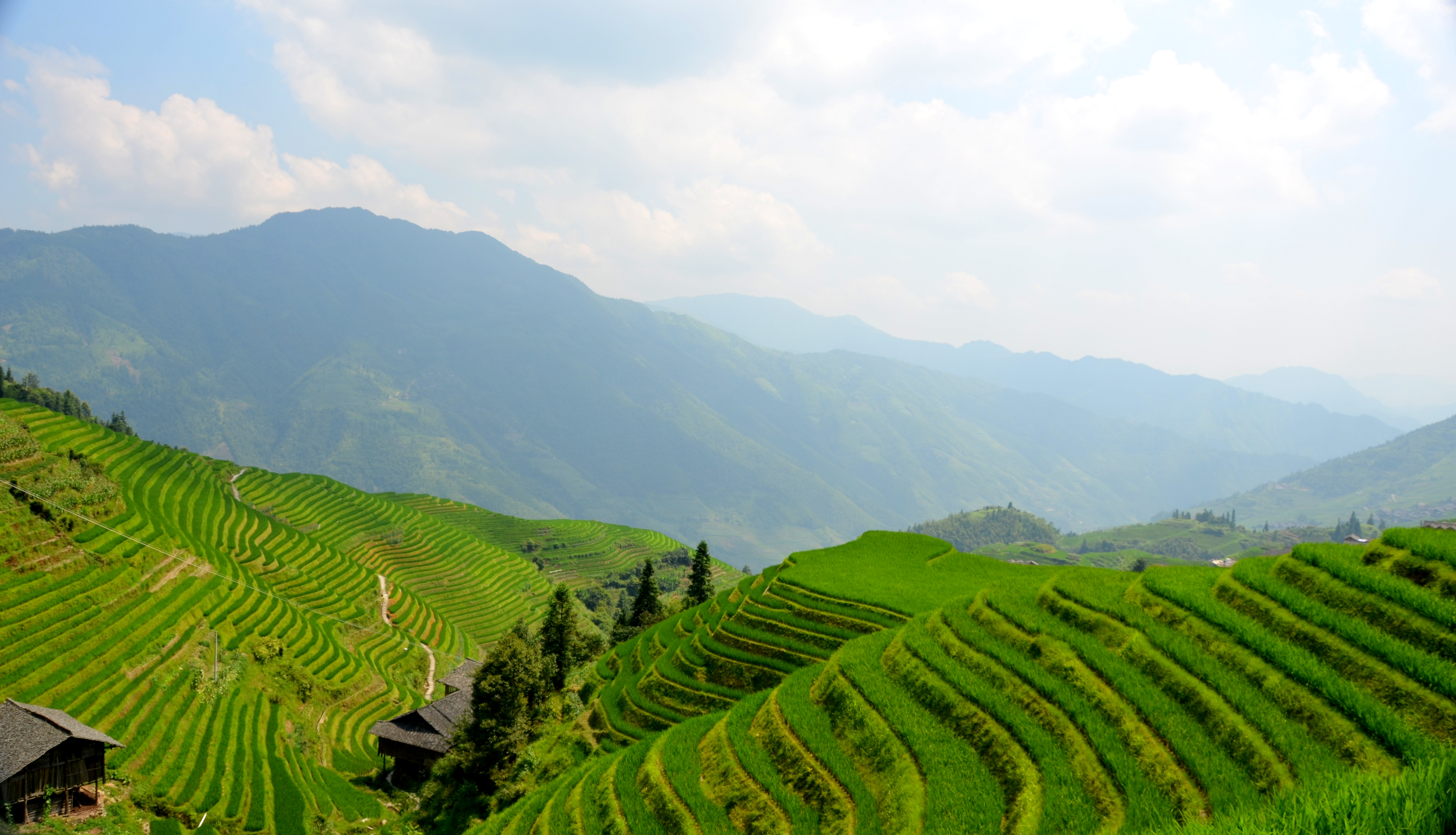
Longji terraces

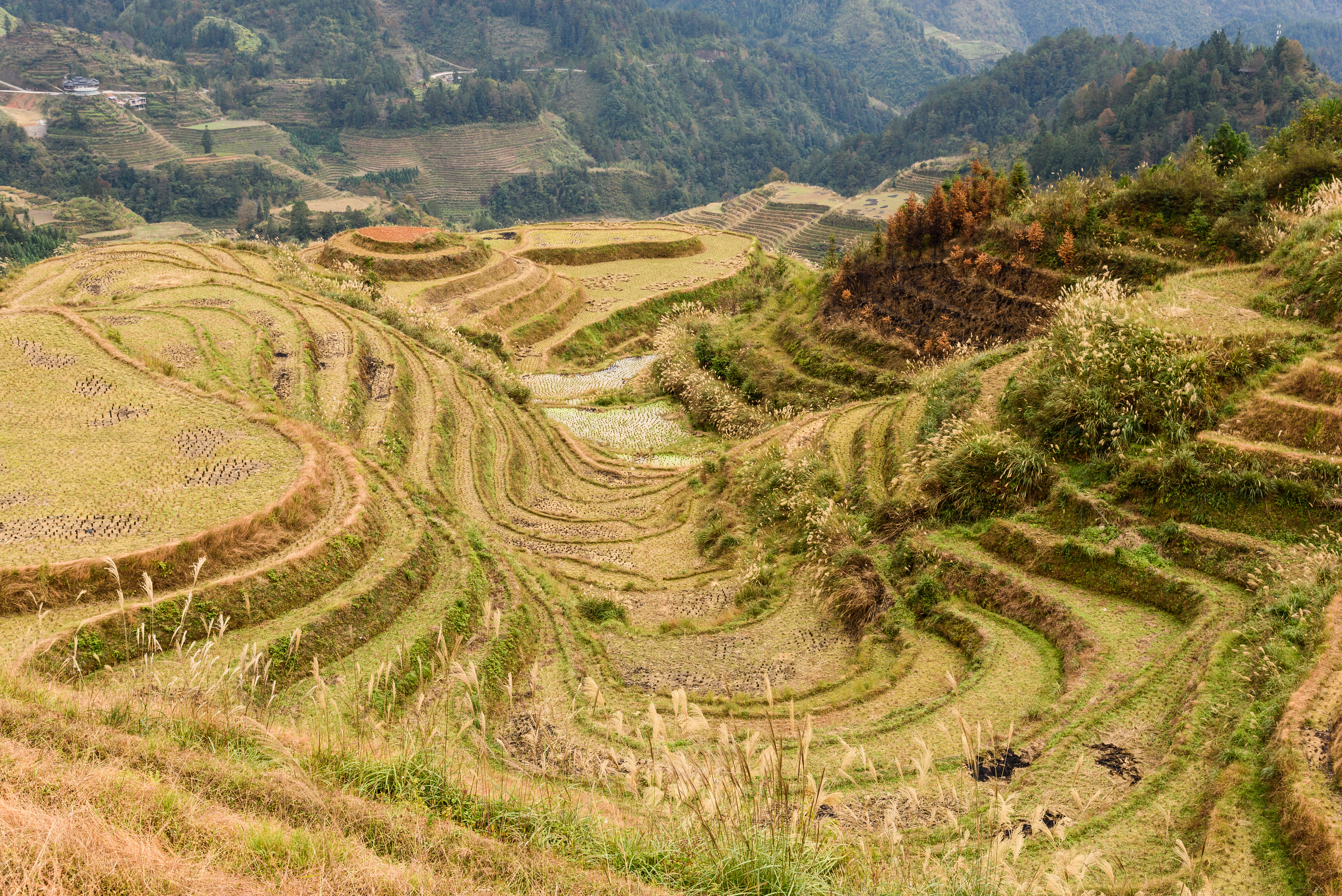
In November

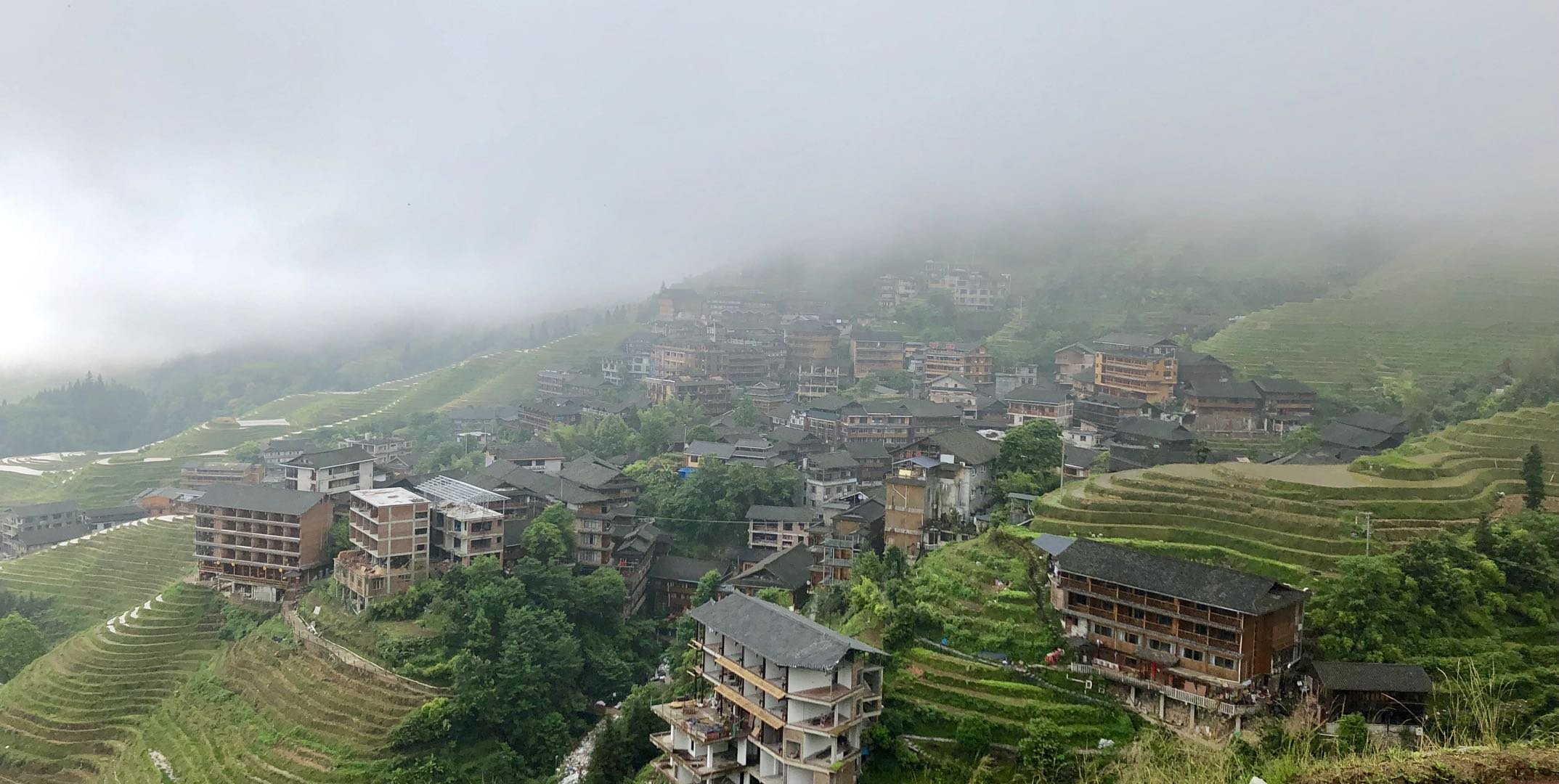
Ping An village in the middle of the terraces
