= Longsheng Various Nationalities Autonomous County =

Longsheng County 龙胜县 Lungzhingz Yen Lungsheng
- Autonomous county
- Longsheng Various Nationalities Autonomous County 龙胜各族自治县; Lungzhingz Gakcuz Swciyen
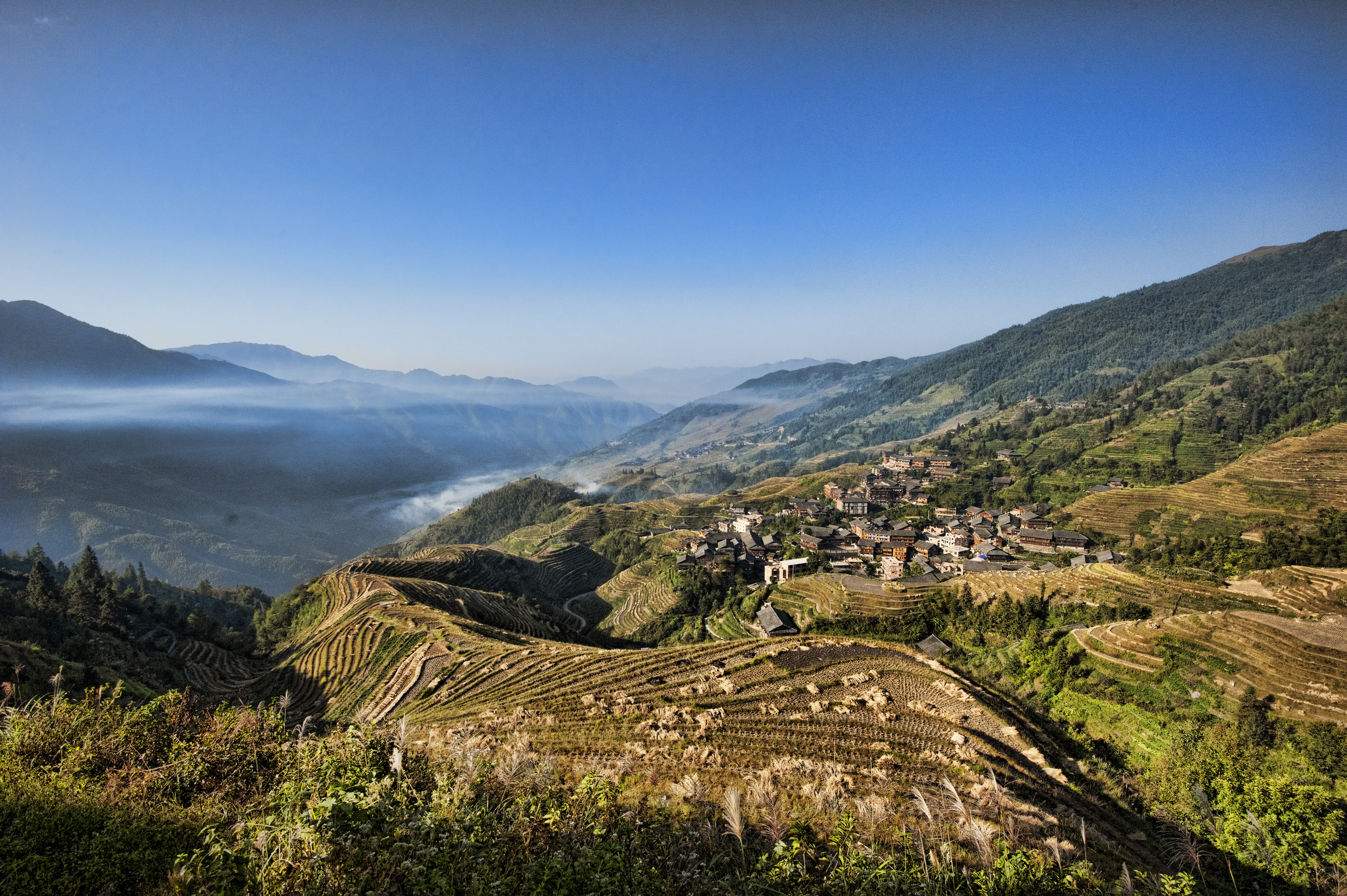

- Location of the seat in Guangxi
- Coordinates: 25°47′53″N 110°00′40″E
- Country: China
- Autonomous region: Guangxi
- Prefecture-level city: Guilin
- County seat: Longsheng Town

Area
  - Total: 2,537 km^{2} (980 sq mi)
- Time zone: UTC+8 (China Standard)

Longsheng Various Nationalities Autonomous County (simplified Chinese: 龙胜各族自治县; traditional Chinese: 龍勝各族自治縣; pinyin: Lóngshèng Gèzú Zìzhìxiàn; Zhuang: Lungzhingz Gakcuz Swciyen; usually referred to as "Longsheng County" 龙胜县; 龍勝縣) is a county in the northeast of Guangxi, China, bordering Hunan Province to the north. It is under the administration of Guilin City. The county covers 2,538 km^{2} (980 sq mi), and as of 2019 it had a census registered population of 186,000. The county has six towns and four townships under its jurisdiction, the county seat is the town of Longsheng.

== Administrative divisions ==
As of 2020, Longsheng Various Nationalities Autonomous County has six towns and four townships under its jurisdiction. The county seat is Longsheng Town.

Name	Chinese character	Area (km²)	Population (2018)	Notes
Longsheng	龙胜镇	320	37,000	
Piaoli	瓢里镇	207.82	14,944	
Sanmen	三门镇	327.88	14,500	
Longji	龙脊镇	273.34	16,000	
Pingdeng	平等镇	365	28,800	
Lejiang	乐江镇	227.88	19,039	
Sishui Township	泗水乡	167.8	13,000	
Jiangdi Township	江底乡	251.17	8,900	
Madi Township	马堤乡	141.48	15,100	
Weijiang Township	伟江乡	170.6	9,700	

== Geography ==
Longsheng Various Nationalities Autonomous County is located in northeastern Guangxi. Longsheng Various Nationalities Autonomous County shares a border with Rong'an County and Sanjiang Dong Autonomous County to the southwest, Tongdao Dong Autonomous County to the northwest, Xing'an County and Ziyuan County to the east, Chengbu Miao Autonomous County to the north, and Lingchuan County and Lingui District to the south.

=== Mountains ===
There are more than 21 mountains over 1,500 metres (4,900 ft) above sea level in Longsheng Various Nationalities Autonomous County. The highest point in the count is the Great South Mountain (Chinese: 大南山) which stands 1,940 metres (6,360 ft) above sea level. The lowest point is Shimentang (石门塘), which, at 163 metres (535 ft) above sea level.

=== Rivers and streams ===
There are over 480 rivers and streams in Longsheng Various Nationalities Autonomous County. Sang River is the largest river in the county.

=== Climate ===
Longsheng Various Nationalities Autonomous County enjoys a subtropical humid monsoon climate, with an average annual temperature of 18.1 °C (64.6 °F), total annual rainfall of 1,500-millimetre (59 in) to 2,400-millimetre (94 in), and a frost-free period of 314 days. The warmest temperature recorded in Longsheng Various Nationalities Autonomous County, on July 30, 1962, is 39.5 °C (103.1 °F). Its record low temperature is −4.8 °C (23.4 °F) observed on January 30, 1977.

Climate data for Longsheng, elevation 268 m (879 ft), (1991–2020 normals, extremes 1981–2010)
Month	Jan	Feb	Mar	Apr	May	Jun	Jul	Aug	Sep	Oct	Nov	Dec	Year
Record high °C (°F)	25.9 (78.6)	30.0 (86.0)	35.1 (95.2)	35.7 (96.3)	34.9 (94.8)	37.0 (98.6)	38.9 (102.0)	38.0 (100.4)	37.5 (99.5)	35.5 (95.9)	31.2 (88.2)	27.0 (80.6)	38.9 (102.0)
Mean daily maximum °C (°F)	11.9 (53.4)	14.7 (58.5)	18.2 (64.8)	24.0 (75.2)	27.7 (81.9)	30.0 (86.0)	32.0 (89.6)	32.5 (90.5)	30.3 (86.5)	25.6 (78.1)	20.6 (69.1)	14.9 (58.8)	23.5 (74.4)
Daily mean °C (°F)	8.1 (46.6)	10.5 (50.9)	13.9 (57.0)	19.2 (66.6)	22.8 (73.0)	25.5 (77.9)	26.9 (80.4)	26.6 (79.9)	24.3 (75.7)	19.8 (67.6)	14.9 (58.8)	9.9 (49.8)	18.5 (65.4)
Mean daily minimum °C (°F)	5.5 (41.9)	7.8 (46.0)	11.1 (52.0)	15.9 (60.6)	19.5 (67.1)	22.7 (72.9)	23.7 (74.7)	23.3 (73.9)	20.6 (69.1)	16.3 (61.3)	11.5 (52.7)	6.8 (44.2)	15.4 (59.7)
Record low °C (°F)	−2.9 (26.8)	−1.9 (28.6)	−1.2 (29.8)	4.2 (39.6)	9.3 (48.7)	12.5 (54.5)	17.1 (62.8)	17.6 (63.7)	12.4 (54.3)	4.1 (39.4)	0.6 (33.1)	−3.7 (25.3)	−3.7 (25.3)
Average precipitation mm (inches)	58.2 (2.29)	67.3 (2.65)	121.4 (4.78)	147.8 (5.82)	259.1 (10.20)	288.1 (11.34)	228.3 (8.99)	144.0 (5.67)	67.4 (2.65)	65.0 (2.56)	64.3 (2.53)	46.3 (1.82)	1,557.2 (61.3)
Average precipitation days (≥ 0.1 mm)	13.3	12.5	17.1	16.7	17.7	19.5	17.7	15.0	9.9	8.7	9.4	9.8	167.3
Average snowy days	1.3	0.7	0	0	0	0	0	0	0	0	0	0.5	2.5
Average relative humidity (%)	79	79	81	81	82	84	83	82	80	79	79	77	81
Mean monthly sunshine hours	46.4	47.4	55.4	80.1	104.5	93.9	146.5	169.7	147.7	124.0	100.3	86.3	1,202.2
Percentage possible sunshine	14	15	15	21	25	23	35	42	40	35	31	27	27
Source: China Meteorological Administration

== Demographics ==
By the end of 2019, there were 186,000 people lived in Longsheng Various Nationalities Autonomous County, among them, 150,300 are agricultural population and 127,600 are ethnic minorities.

=== Ethnic groups ===
There are five major ethnic groups in Longsheng Various Nationalities Autonomous County: the Miao, Yao, Dong, Zhuang and Han. According to 2010 census, the county is mostly populated by ethnic Dong (26.5%), with a sizeable population of ethnic Zhuang (22%), Yao (17%) and Miao (15%).

==== Miao people ====
The Miao people of Longsheng County are largely concentrated in 13 villages throughout the county: Niutou (Chinese: 牛头), Zhangjia (Chinese: 张家), Longjia (Chinese: 龙家), Lishi (Chinese: 里市), Dongsheng (Chinese: 东升), Yangwan (Chinese: 洋湾), Furong (Chinese: 芙蓉), Bunong (Chinese: 布弄), Zhongdong (Chinese: 中洞), Limu (Chinese: 里木), Conglin (Chinese: 从林), Dawan (Chinese: 大湾), and Liangping (Chinese: 凉坪).

==== Yao people ====
The Yao people of Longsheng County are largely concentrated in 13 villages throughout the county. In the eastern part, the Yao live in the villages of Zhonglu (Chinese: 中禄), Dazhai (Chinese: 大寨), Xiaozhai (Chinese: 小寨), Pannei (Chinese: 潘内), Ximen (Chinese: 细门), Zhoujia (Chinese: 周家), Jianxin (Chinese: 建新), Lijiang (Chinese: 李江), and Qinling (Chinese: 秦岭). In the northern part, the Yao live in the villages of Liuli (Chinese: 琉璃) and Tongluo (Chinese: 铜锣). In the southern part, the Yao live in the villages of Tonglie (Chinese: 同列) and Tandi (Chinese: 滩底).

The subgroups of the Yao people of Longsheng County include the Pan Yao (Chinese: 盘瑶), Red Yao (Chinese: 红瑶) (Younuo), and the Flowery Yao (Chinese: 花瑶).

==== Dong people ====
The Dong people of Longsheng County are largely concentrated in 23 villages throughout the county.

==== Zhuang people ====
The Zhuang people of Longsheng County are largely concentrated in 17 villages in the western portion of the county: Longji (Chinese: 龙脊), Ping'an (Chinese: 平安), Jinjiang (Chinese: 金江), Haijiang (Chinese: 海江), Baishi (Chinese: 白石), Daliu (Chinese: 大柳), Shuangdong (Chinese: 双洞), Jinjie (Chinese: 金结), Pingye (Chinese: 平也), Dayun (Chinese: 大云), Jiaozhou (Chinese: 交州), Liuman (Chinese: 六漫), Silong (Chinese: 思陇), Meidong (Chinese: 梅洞), Menghua (Chinese: 孟化), Hongzhai (Chinese: 洪寨), and Huaqiao (Chinese: 花桥).

=== Language ===
Mandarin is the official language. Local residents exclusively speak native languages at home.

=== Religion ===
The Miao, Yao, Dong and Zhuang people believe in animism and worship ancestors. Buddhism and Taoism are widespread religions of Han Chinese in Longsheng Various Nationalities Autonomous County.

== Transport ==
The China National Highway 321, commonly referred to as "G321", is a southeast–northwest highway passing through the county's downtown, commercial, and industrial districts in the western part of Longsheng Various Nationalities Autonomous County.

The G65 Baotou–Maoming Expressway, more commonly known as "Bao-Mao Expressway", runs from the northwest to southeast of Longsheng Various Nationalities Autonomous County.

== Tourism ==
Longsheng Various Nationalities Autonomous County is known worldwide for the Longsheng Rice Terraces. Major tourist destinations include Yulongtan Scenic Spot (玉龙滩旅游风景区), Huaping National Nature Reserve (花坪国家级自然保护区), Baimian Yao Village (白面瑶寨), Longsheng Hot Spring (龙胜温泉), Weijiang Rice Terraces (伟江梯田), and Xiabilin Waterfall (下碧林瀑布). The county boasts many cultural and historical relics, including the Shunfeng Bridge (顺风桥; also known as "Red Army Bridge") and the Pan Village Wind-rain Bridge (潘寨风雨桥).

== Gallery ==
Longsheng

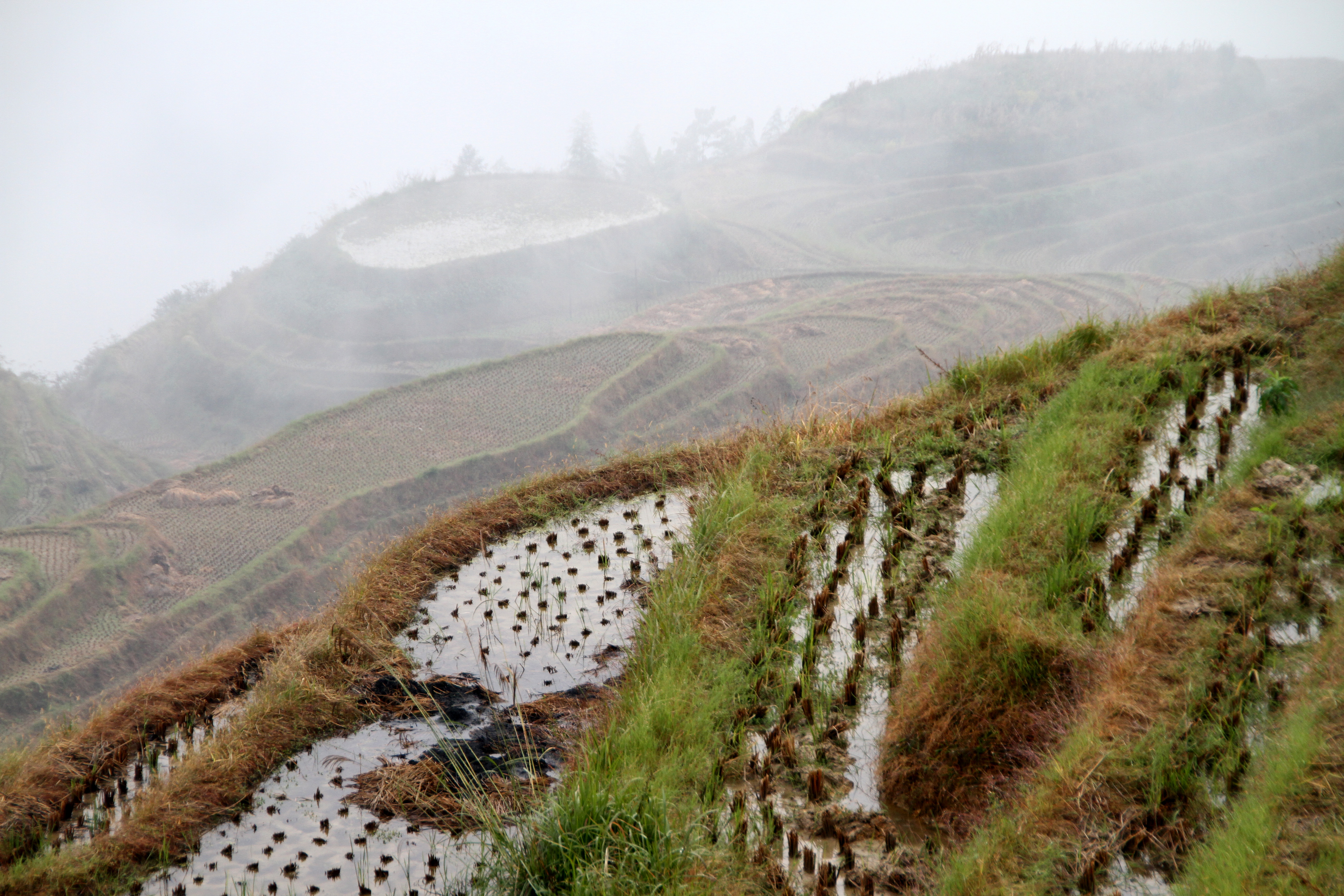
Rice terraces
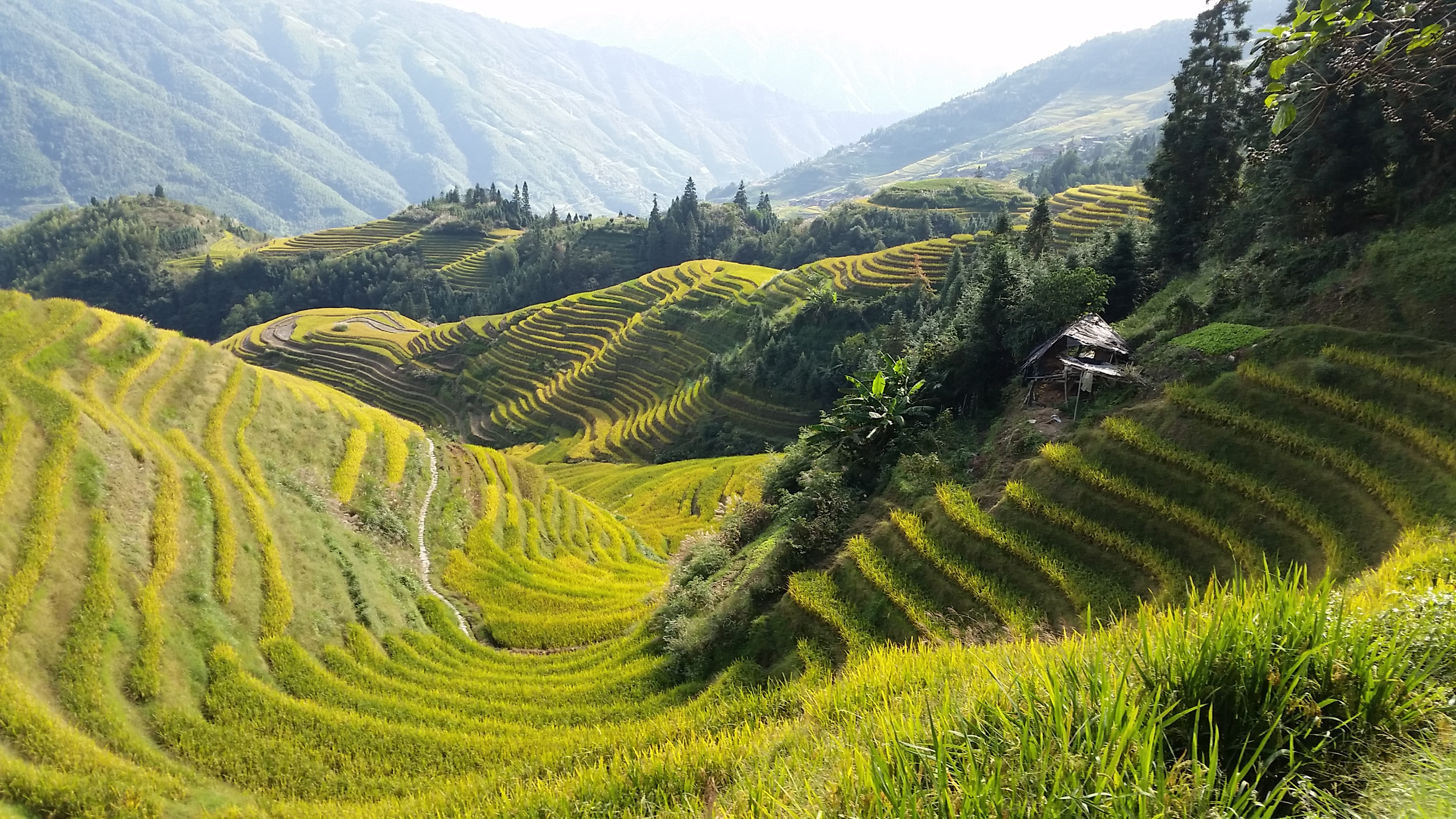
Ping-an

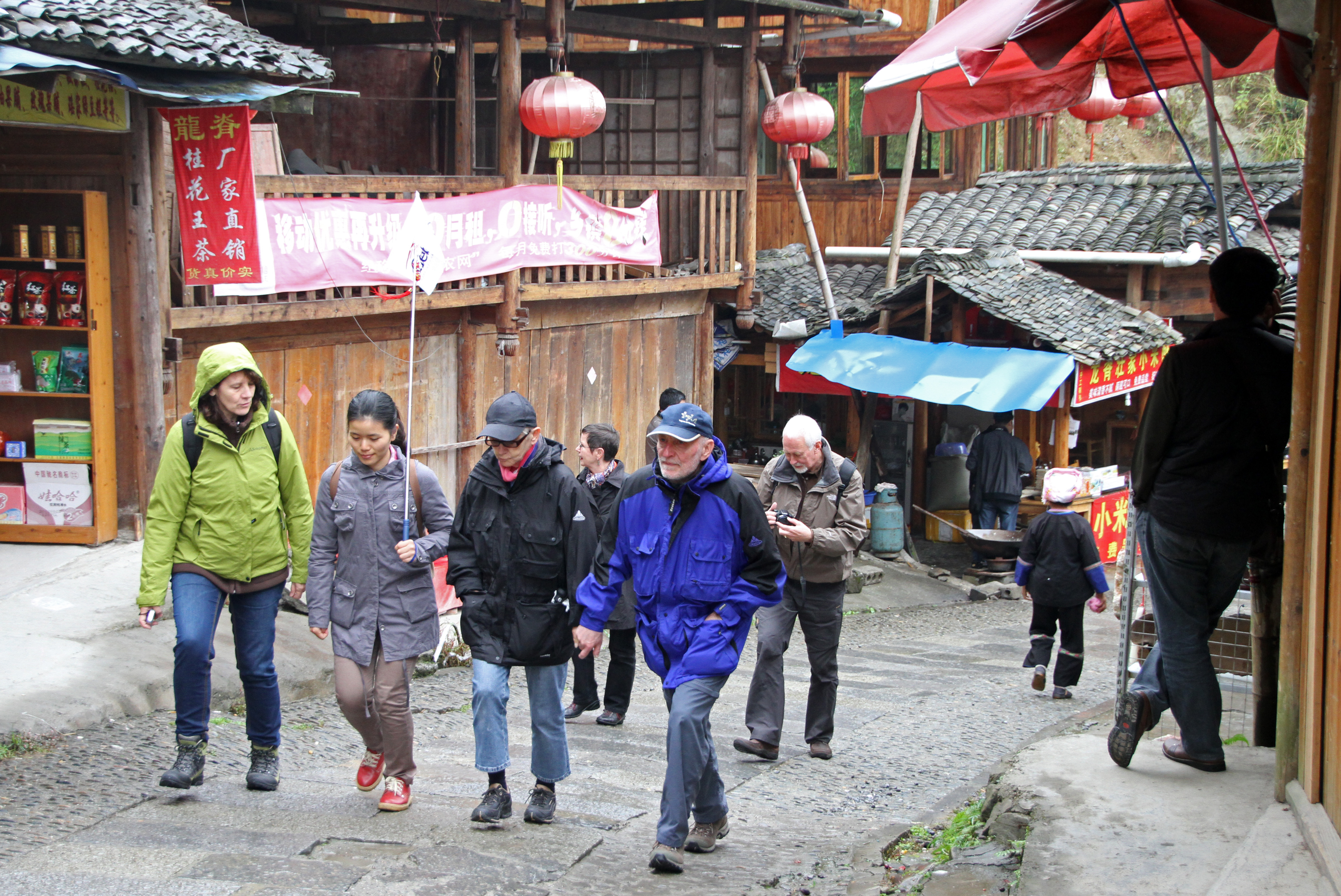
Way up to the rice terraces

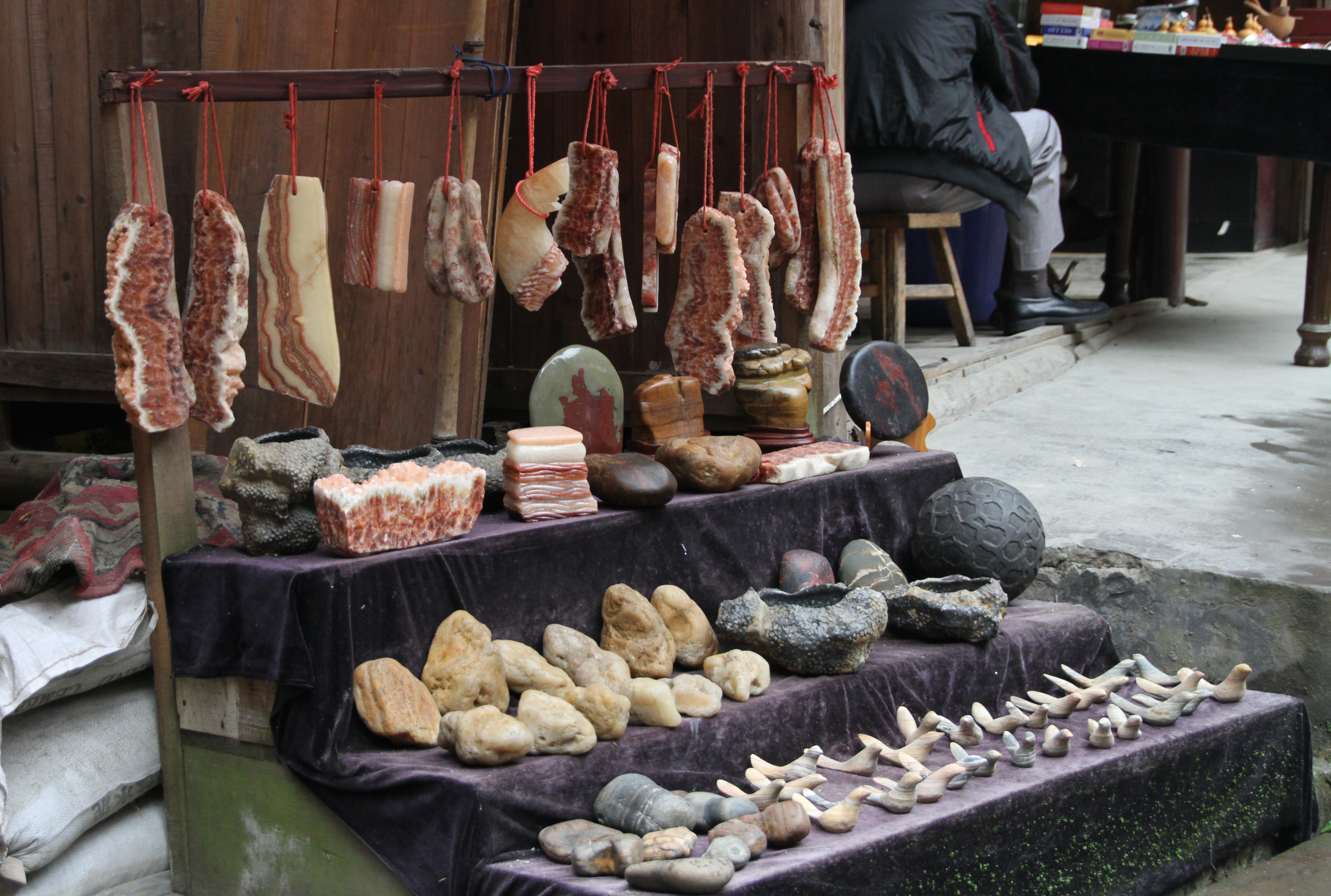
Souvenirs

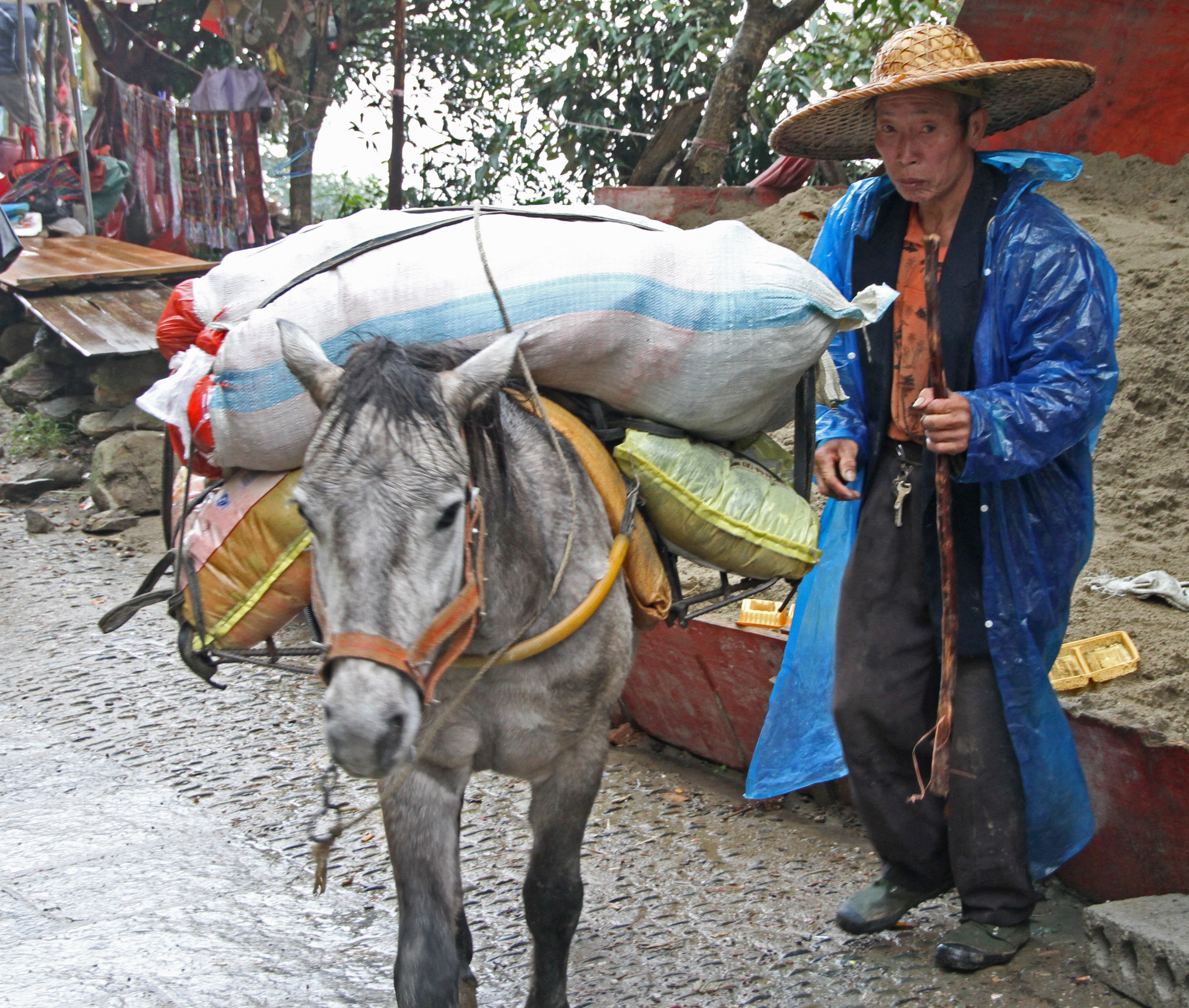
Transport

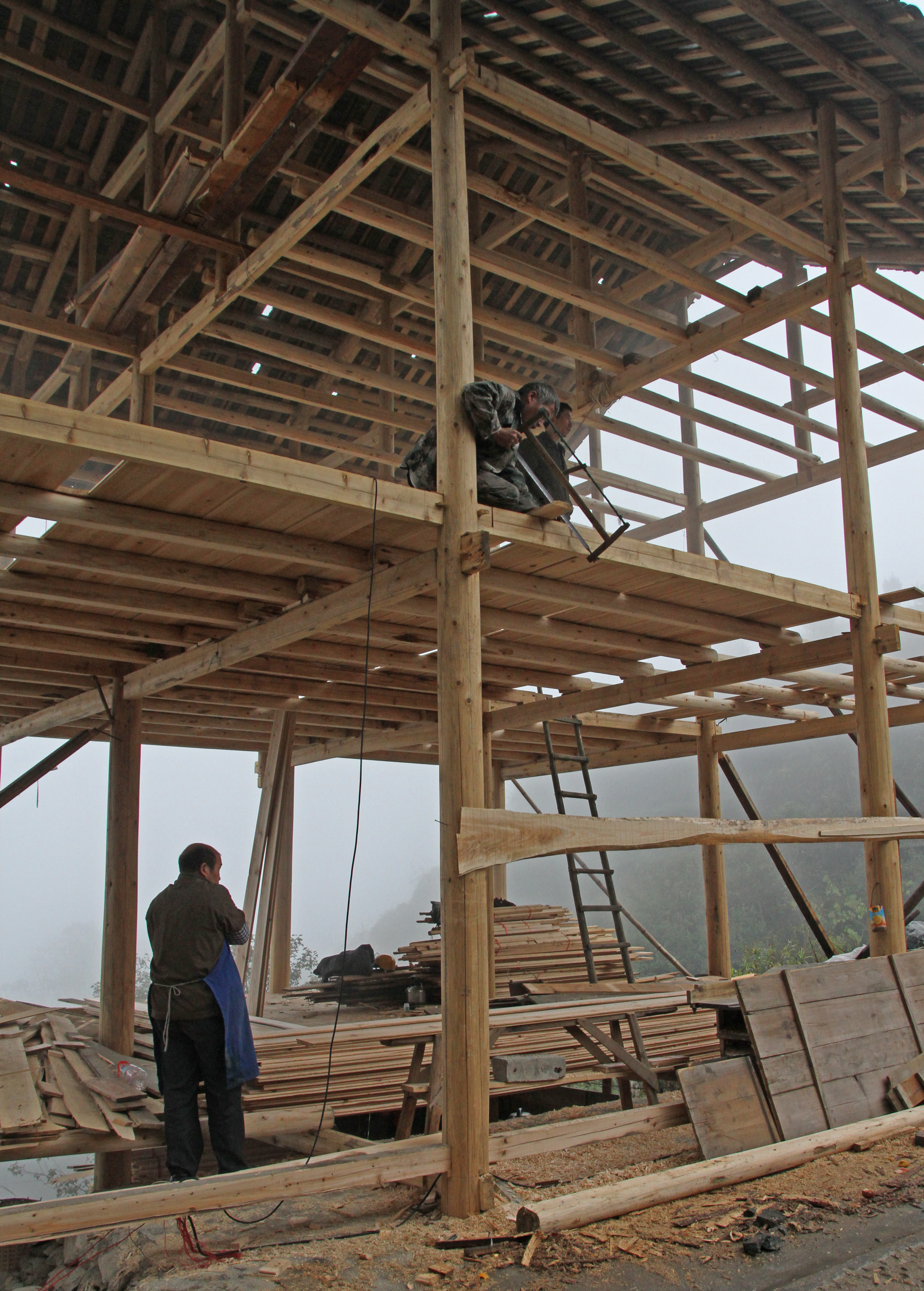
Building a house

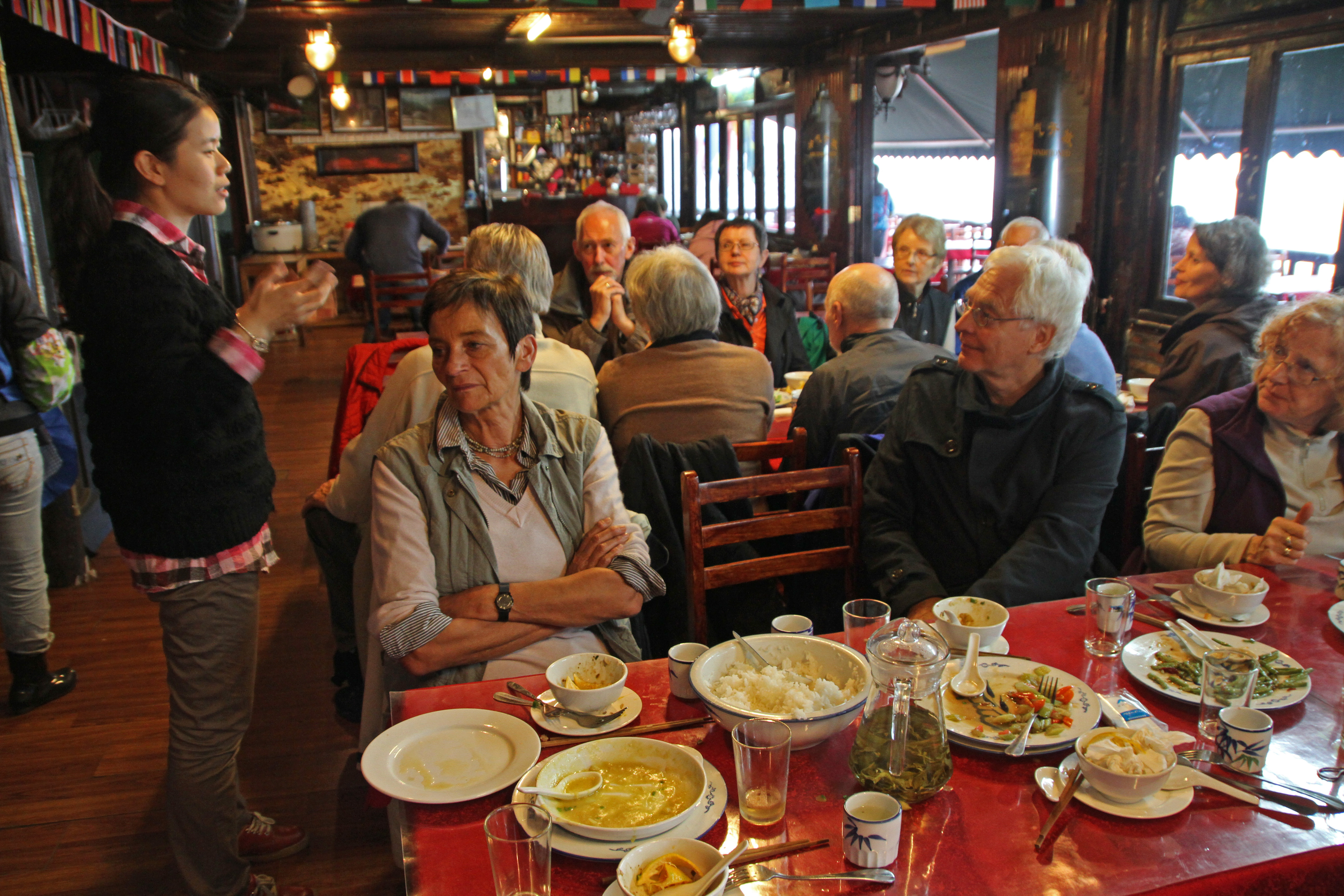
Restaurant on the way up

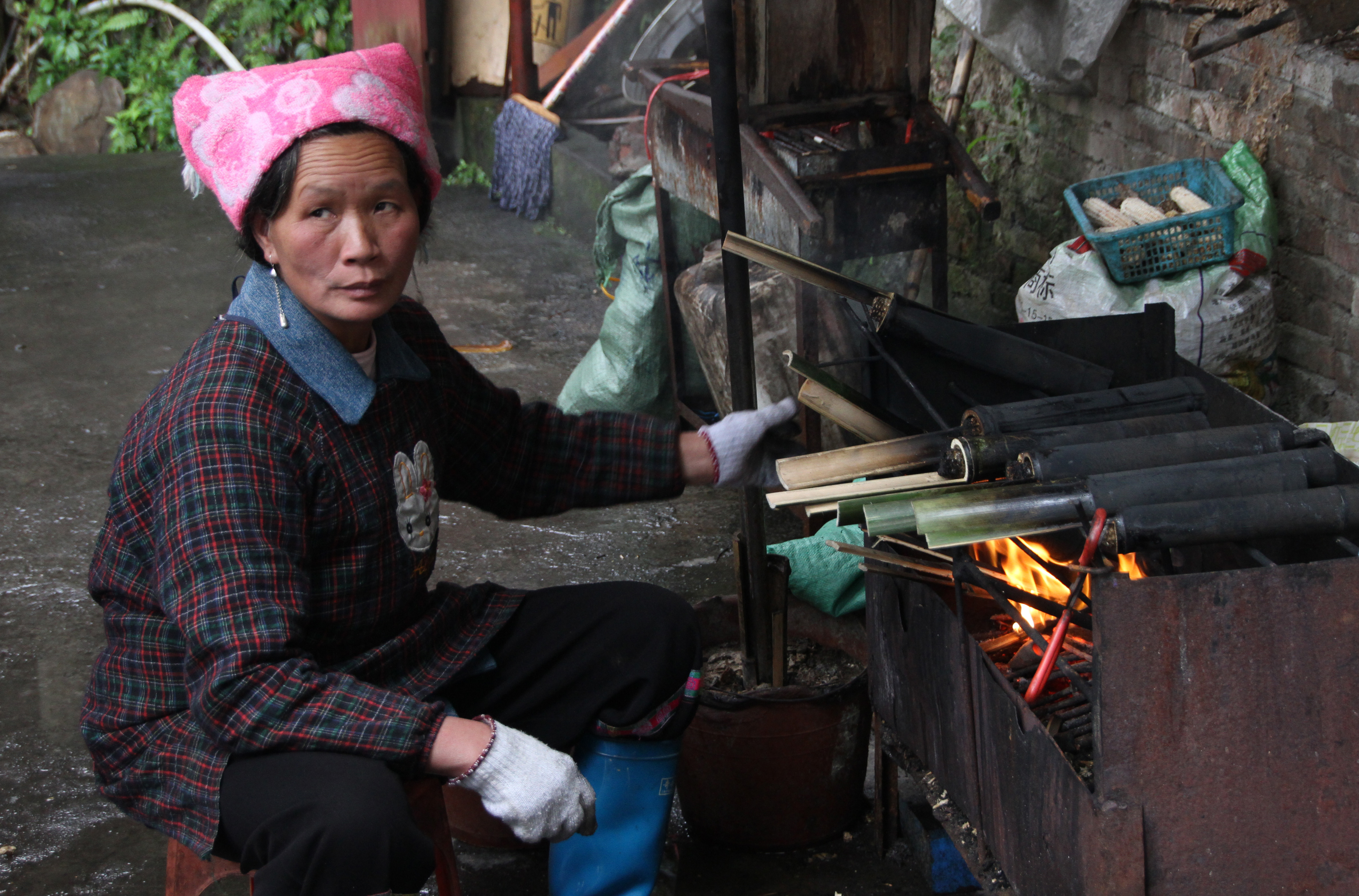
Cook

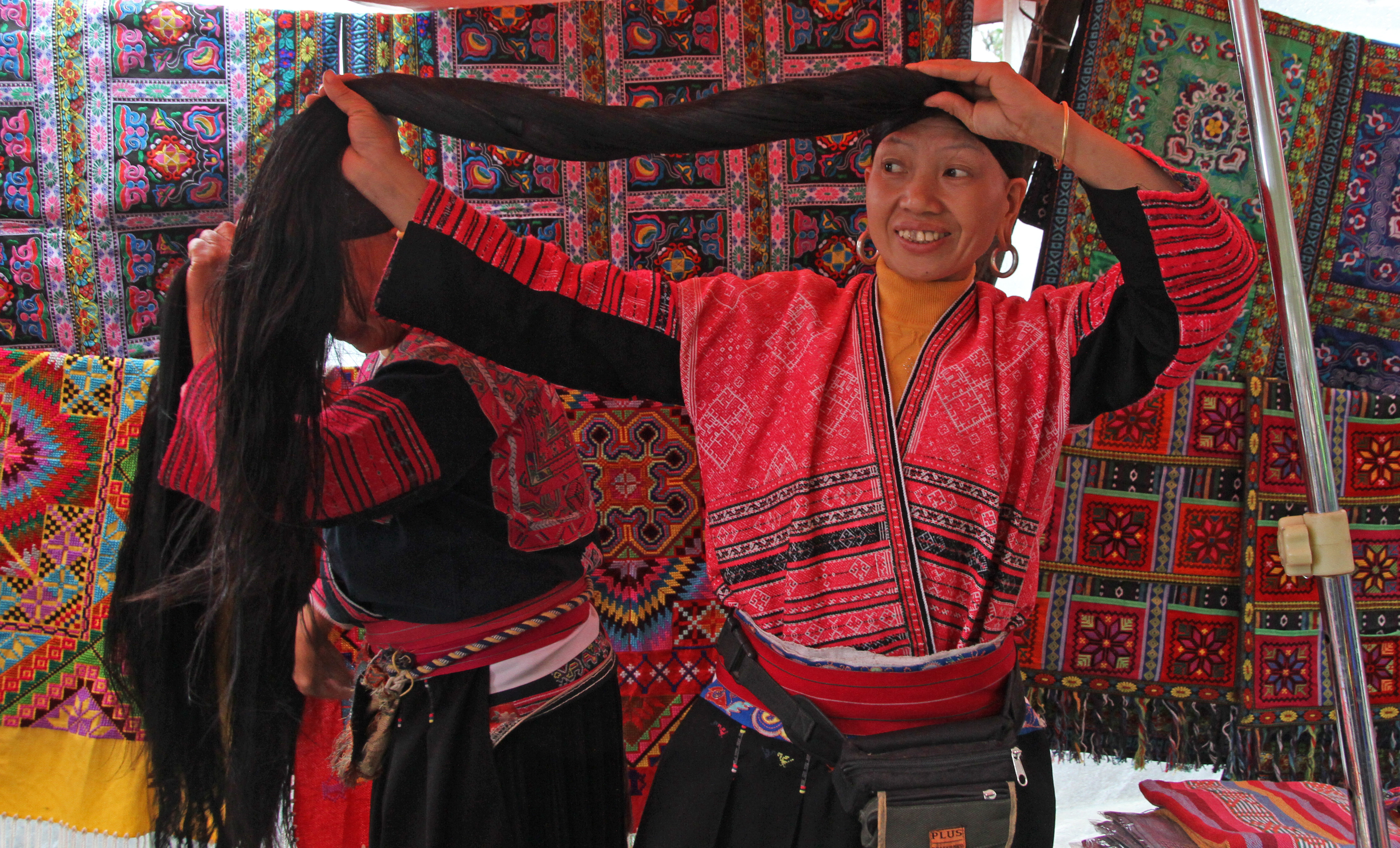
Yao women showing their hairstyle
