= Lejiang =

Lejiang Town 乐江镇
- Town
- Location in Guangxi
- Coordinates: 25°54′58″N 109°52′19″E
- Country: China
- Autonomous region: Guangxi
- Prefecture: Guilin
- Autonomous county: Longsheng Various Nationalities Autonomous County

Area
  - Total: 227.88 km^{2} (87.98 sq mi)

Population (2018)
  - Total: 19,039
  - Density: 83.548/km^{2} (216.39/sq mi)
- Time zone: UTC+08:00 (China Standard)
- Postal code: 541705
- Area code: 0773

Lejiang (simplified Chinese: 乐江镇; traditional Chinese: 樂江鎮; pinyin: Lèjiāng Zhèn) is a town in Longsheng Various Nationalities Autonomous County, Guangxi, China. As of the 2018 census it had a population of 19,039 and an area of 227.88-square-kilometre (87.98 sq mi).

== Administrative division ==
As of 2016, the town is divided into thirteen villages:

- Jinping (金坪村)
- Lejiang (乐江村)
- Jiangkou (江口村)
- Liangping (凉坪村)
- Shijing (石京村)
- Shijia (石甲村)
- Guangming (光明村)
- Dujing (独境村)
- Diling (地灵村)
- Daxiong (大雄村)
- Baozeng (宝赠村)
- Tongle (同乐村)
- Xiyao (西腰村)

== History ==
It belonged to Piaoli Township (瓢里乡) between December 1949 and September 1987. On September 17, 1987, some villages separated from Piaoli Township and formed Lejiang Township. On November 16, 2018, it was upgraded to a town.

On December 9, 2016, the villages of Baozeng, Diling and Shijia was listed among the fourth group of "List of Traditional Villages in China" by the State Council of China.

== Geography ==
The town is situated at northwestern Longsheng Various Nationalities Autonomous County. It borders Weijiang Township and Pingdeng Town in the northeast, Piaoli Town in the south, and Tongdao Dong Autonomous County in the northwest.

There are ten rivers and streams in the town. The Xun River winds through the town.

== Economy ==
The region abounds with jade, coal, copper, antimony, and marble.

== Transportation ==
The G65 Baotou–Maoming Expressway, more commonly known as "Bao-Mao Expressway", runs west to east through the southern town.
