= Jiangdi Township =

Jiangdi Township 江底乡
- Township
- Location in Guangxi
- Coordinates: 25°55′04″N 110°14′54″E
- Country: China
- Autonomous region: Guangxi
- Prefecture: Guilin
- Autonomous county: Longsheng Various Nationalities Autonomous County

Area
  - Total: 251.17 km^{2} (96.98 sq mi)

Population (2018)
  - Total: 8,900
  - Density: 35/km^{2} (92/sq mi)
- Time zone: UTC+08:00 (China Standard)
- Postal code: 541709
- Area code: 0773

Jiangdi Township (simplified Chinese: 江底乡; traditional Chinese: 江底鄉; pinyin: Jiāngdǐ Xiāng) is a township in Longsheng Various Nationalities Autonomous County, Guangxi, China. As of the 2018 census it had a population of 8,900 and an area of 251.17-square-kilometre (96.98 sq mi).

== Administrative division ==
As of 2016, the township is divided into eight villages:

- Jiangdi (江底村)
- Nitang (泥塘村)
- Jianxin (建新村)
- Lijiang (李江村)
- Chengling (城岭村)
- Longtang (龙塘村)
- Dilin (地林村)
- Weizi (围子村)

== History ==
It was incorporated as a township in 1984.

On December 9, 2016, the villages of Chengling, Jianxin and Lijiang was listed among the fourth group of "List of Traditional Villages in China" by the State Council of China. On June 6, 2019, the village of Nitang was listed among the fifth group of "List of Traditional Villages in China" by the State Council of China.

== Geography ==
The township is located in northeastern Longsheng Various Nationalities Autonomous County.

The Sang River (桑江), a tributary of the Xun River, passes through the town northeast to southwest.

== Economy ==
The region abounds with copper, gold, and tungsten.

== Tourist attractions ==
The Longsheng Hot Spring (龙胜温泉) is a famous scenic spot in China.

== Transportation ==
The Provincial Highway S219 is a south-north highway in the town. Jiangdi Township is the starting point of the highway.
