= Lingui District =

Lingui 临桂区 · Linzgvei Gih
- District
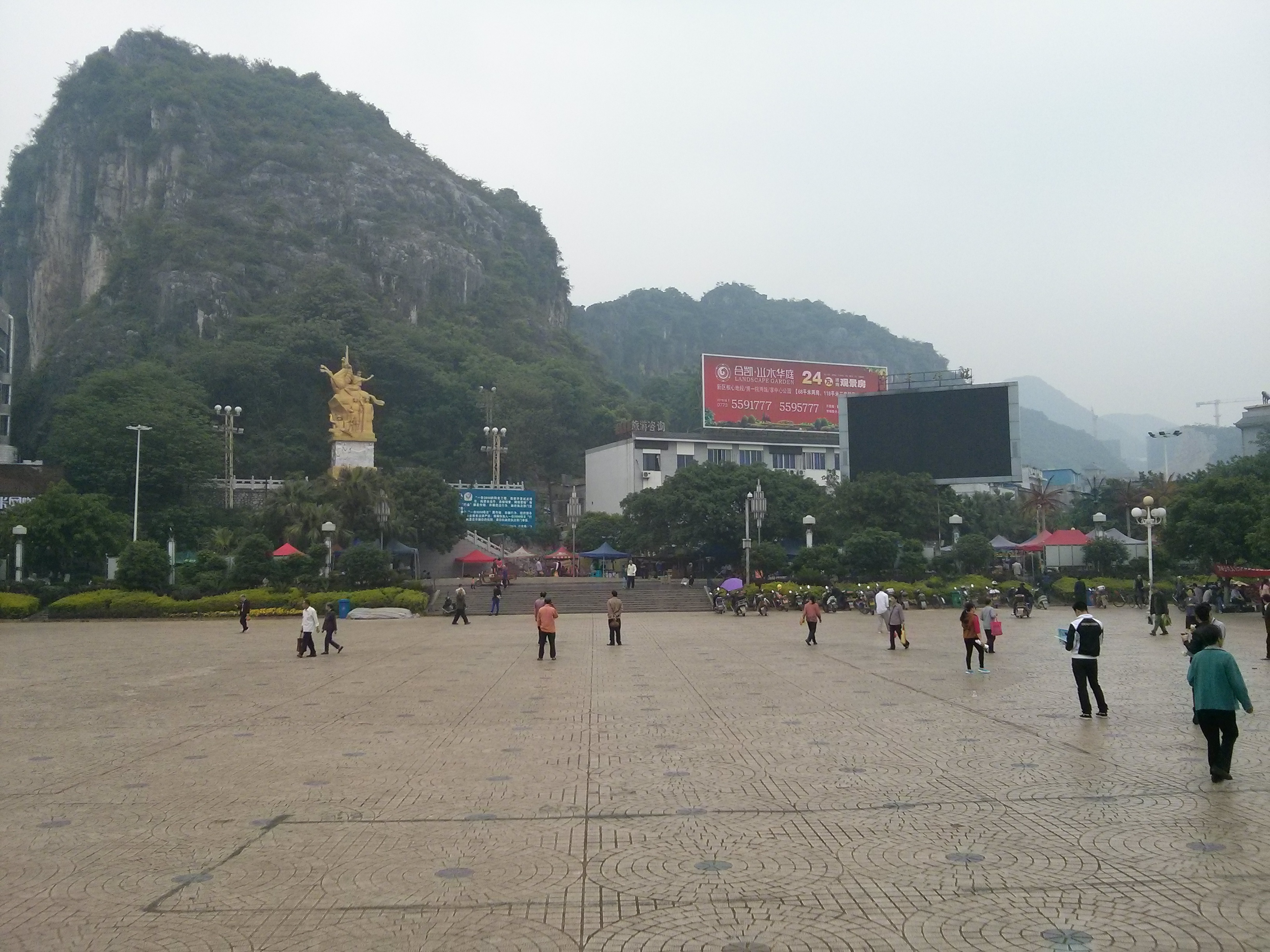
- Interactive map of Lingui
- Coordinates: 25°12′N 110°12′E
- Country: China
- Region: Guangxi
- Prefecture-level city: Guilin
- District seat: Lingui Town (临桂镇)

Area
  - Total: 2,202 km^{2} (850 sq mi)
- Elevation: 162 m (531 ft)

Population (2002)
  - Total: 450,000
  - Density: 200/km^{2} (530/sq mi)
- Time zone: UTC+8 (China Standard)
- Postal code: 541100

Lingui District (Chinese: 临桂区; pinyin: Línguì Qū) is the county seat and district administered by Guilin, Guangxi, China, and located midway between Guilin and Yangshuo. The district is mostly rural and hilly, marked by the same dramatic karst topography for which Guilin is famous. Tourist attractions include Snake World, Xiongsheng Tiger and Bear Village, and Crocodile Kingdom.

The district is also known as a center of luohan guo (Siraitia grosvenorii) production.

Olympic diver Li Ting is a native of Lingui.

World record holding Olympic weightlifter Shi Zhiyong is also a native of Lingui.

== History ==
The Shiji and Hanshu state that around 104 BCE, the Han first built fortifications west of the district of Lingui and established the province of Jiuquan (in modern-day Gansu) to facilitate a safe route to the lands of the northwest along the Silk Road. As a result, more and more envoys were sent through this territory to Anxi, Yancai, Lixuan, Tiaozhi, and Shendu.

== Administrative divisions ==
The district administers 9 towns and 2 ethnic townships:

Towns

Lingui Town (临桂镇), Liutang (六塘镇), Huixian (会仙镇), Liangjiang (两江镇), Wutong (五通镇), Sitang Town (四塘镇), Zhongyong Town (中庸镇), Nanbianshan Town (南边山镇), Chadong Town (茶洞镇)

Ethnic Townships

Wantian Yao Ethnic Township (宛田瑶族乡), Huangsha Yao Ethnic Township (黄沙瑶族乡)

== Climate ==
Climate data for Lingui District, elevation 223 m (732 ft), (1991–2020 normals, extremes 1991–present)
Month	Jan	Feb	Mar	Apr	May	Jun	Jul	Aug	Sep	Oct	Nov	Dec	Year
Record high °C (°F)	26.6 (79.9)	31.3 (88.3)	31.4 (88.5)	35.0 (95.0)	36.0 (96.8)	36.5 (97.7)	39.1 (102.4)	40.1 (104.2)	38.2 (100.8)	35.4 (95.7)	31.7 (89.1)	27.9 (82.2)	40.1 (104.2)
Mean daily maximum °C (°F)	12.1 (53.8)	14.6 (58.3)	17.8 (64.0)	24.0 (75.2)	28.1 (82.6)	30.6 (87.1)	32.8 (91.0)	33.3 (91.9)	31.1 (88.0)	26.7 (80.1)	21.2 (70.2)	15.3 (59.5)	24.0 (75.1)
Daily mean °C (°F)	8.7 (47.7)	11.0 (51.8)	14.2 (57.6)	19.8 (67.6)	23.9 (75.0)	26.6 (79.9)	28.3 (82.9)	28.3 (82.9)	26.2 (79.2)	21.8 (71.2)	16.4 (61.5)	11.0 (51.8)	19.7 (67.4)
Mean daily minimum °C (°F)	6.2 (43.2)	8.4 (47.1)	11.6 (52.9)	16.7 (62.1)	20.8 (69.4)	23.8 (74.8)	25.1 (77.2)	24.9 (76.8)	22.5 (72.5)	18.1 (64.6)	12.9 (55.2)	7.8 (46.0)	16.6 (61.8)
Record low °C (°F)	−2.2 (28.0)	−1.2 (29.8)	1.3 (34.3)	5.7 (42.3)	11.1 (52.0)	17.1 (62.8)	20.1 (68.2)	19.7 (67.5)	13.5 (56.3)	7.3 (45.1)	2.0 (35.6)	−3.6 (25.5)	−3.6 (25.5)
Average precipitation mm (inches)	73.6 (2.90)	83.0 (3.27)	156.8 (6.17)	213.5 (8.41)	310.5 (12.22)	450.5 (17.74)	254.0 (10.00)	170.2 (6.70)	71.0 (2.80)	53.6 (2.11)	76.4 (3.01)	53.5 (2.11)	1,966.6 (77.44)
Average precipitation days (≥ 0.1 mm)	14.2	14.1	20.3	18.5	18.9	18.9	16.4	13.2	8.4	8.0	9.4	9.9	170.2
Average snowy days	1.0	0.4	0	0	0	0	0	0	0	0	0	0.3	1.7
Average relative humidity (%)	72	73	79	79	80	83	80	77	71	67	69	67	75
Mean monthly sunshine hours	57.2	50.2	52.9	76.6	108.2	110.7	182.1	198.0	178.9	155.5	121.9	101.5	1,393.7
Percentage possible sunshine	17	16	14	20	26	27	44	50	49	44	38	31	31
Source: China Meteorological Administration All-time April high
