= List of township-level divisions of Guangxi =

Location of Guangxi in China

This is a list of township-level divisions of Guangxi Zhuang Autonomous Region, China. After province, prefecture, and county-level divisions, township-level divisions constitute the formal fourth-level administrative divisions of the PRC. There are a total of 1,230 such divisions in Guangxi, divided into 106 subdistricts, 707 towns, 367 townships, and 50 ethnic townships, the last type designated mainly for the Yao and Miao people. This list is divided first into the prefecture-level then the county-level divisions.

== Nanning ==
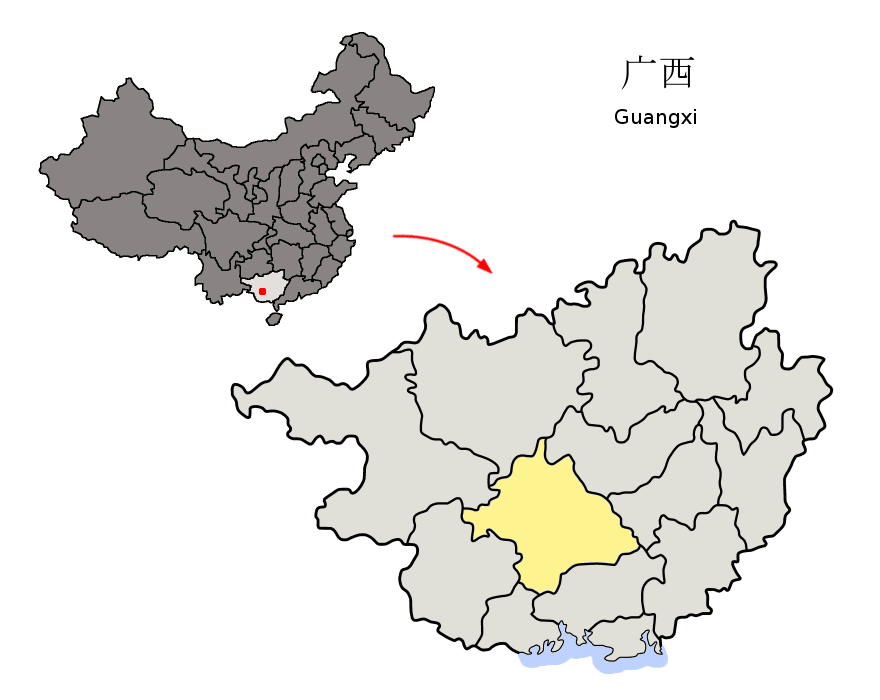
Location of Nanning in the region

=== Jiangnan District ===
Subdistricts:

- Jiangnan Subdistrict (江南街道), Fujianyuan Subdistrict (福建园街道), Shajing Subdistrict (沙井街道), Nahong Subdistrict (那洪街道)

Towns:

- Jiangxi (江西镇), Wuxu (吴圩镇), Suxu (苏圩镇), Yan'an (延安镇)

=== Liangqing District ===
Towns:

- Liangqing Town (良庆镇), Nama (那马镇), Nachen (那陈镇), Datang (大塘镇), Nanxiao (南晓镇)

=== Qingxiu District ===
Subdistricts:

- Xinzhu Subdistrict (新竹街道), Zhongshan Subdistrict (中山街道), Jianzheng Subdistrict (建政街道), Nanhu Subdistrict (南湖街道), Jintou Subdistrict (津头街道)

Towns:

- Liuxu (刘圩镇), Nanyang (南阳镇), Lingli (伶俐镇), Changtang (长塘镇)

=== Xingning District ===
Subdistricts:

- Minsheng Subdistrict (民生街道), Chaoyang Subdistrict (朝阳街道)

Towns:

- Santang (三塘镇), Wutang (五塘镇), Kunlun (昆仑镇)

=== Xixiangtang District ===
Subdistricts:

- Xixiangtang Subdistrict (西乡塘街道), Hengyang Subdistrict (衡阳街道), Beihu Subdistrict (北湖街道), Anji Subdistrict (安吉街道), Xinyang Subdistrict (新阳街道), Huaqiang Subdistrict (华强街道), Shangyao Subdistrict (上尧街道), Anning Subdistrict (安宁街道), Shibu Subdistrict (石埠街道), Xinxu Subdistrict (心圩街道)

Towns:

- Jinling (金陵镇), Shuangding (双定镇), Tanluo (坛洛镇)

=== Yongning District ===
Towns:

- Pumiao (蒲庙镇), Xinjiang (新江镇), Nalou (那楼镇)

Townships:

- Baiji Township (百济乡), Zhonghe Township (中和乡)

=== Binyang County ===
Towns:

- Binzhou (宾州镇), Litang (黎塘镇), Xinqiao (新桥镇), Xinxu (新圩镇), Daqiao (大桥镇), Zouxu (邹圩镇), Gantang (甘棠镇), Gula (古辣镇), Luxu (露圩镇), Yangqiao (洋桥镇), Wangling (王灵镇), Wuling (武陵镇), Zhonghua (中华镇), Silong (思陇镇), Heji (和吉镇)

The only township is Chenping Township (陈平乡)

=== Heng County ===
Towns:

- Hengzhou (横州镇), Luancheng (峦城镇), Liujing (六景镇), Shitang (石塘镇), Taoxu (陶圩镇), Xiaoyi (校椅镇), Yunbiao (云表镇), Baihe (百合镇), Nayang (那阳镇), Nanxiang (南乡镇), Xinfu (新福镇), Liantang (莲塘镇), Pingma (平马镇), Maling (马岭镇)

Townships:

- Mashan Township (马山乡), Pinglang Township (平朗乡), Zhenlong Township (镇龙乡)

=== Long'an County ===
Towns:

- Chengxiang (城厢镇), Natong (那桐镇), Qiaojian (乔建镇), Nanxu (南圩镇), Yanjiang (雁江镇), Dingdang (丁当镇)

Townships:

- Pingshan Township (屏山乡), Buquan Township (布泉乡), Dujie Township (都结乡), Gutan Township (古潭乡)

=== Mashan County ===
Towns:

- Baishan (白山镇), Bailonghu (百龙滩镇), Guling (古零镇), Jinchai (金钗镇), Zhoulu (周鹿镇), Linxu (林圩镇), Yongzhou (永州镇)

Townships:

- Lidang Township (里当乡), Qiaoli Township (乔利乡), Guzhai Yao Ethnic Township (古寨瑶族乡), Jiafang Yao Ethnic Township (加方瑶族乡)

=== Shanglin County ===
Towns:

- Dafeng (大丰镇), Mingliang (明亮镇), Xiangxian (巷贤镇), Baixu (白圩镇), Sanli (三里镇), Xiyan (西燕镇), Qiaoxian (乔贤镇)

Townships:

- Chengtai Township (澄泰乡), Tanghong Township (塘红乡), Mushan Township (木山乡), Zhenwei Yao Ethnic Township (镇圩瑶族乡)

=== Wuming County ===
Towns:

- Chengxiang (城厢镇), Liangjiang (两江镇), Matou (马头镇), Luwo (陆斡镇), Luobo (罗波镇), Taiping (太平镇), Shuangqiao (双桥镇), Ganxu (甘圩镇), Ningwu (宁武镇), Luoxu (锣圩镇), Xianhu (仙湖镇), Fucheng (府城镇), Lingma (灵马镇)

== Baise ==
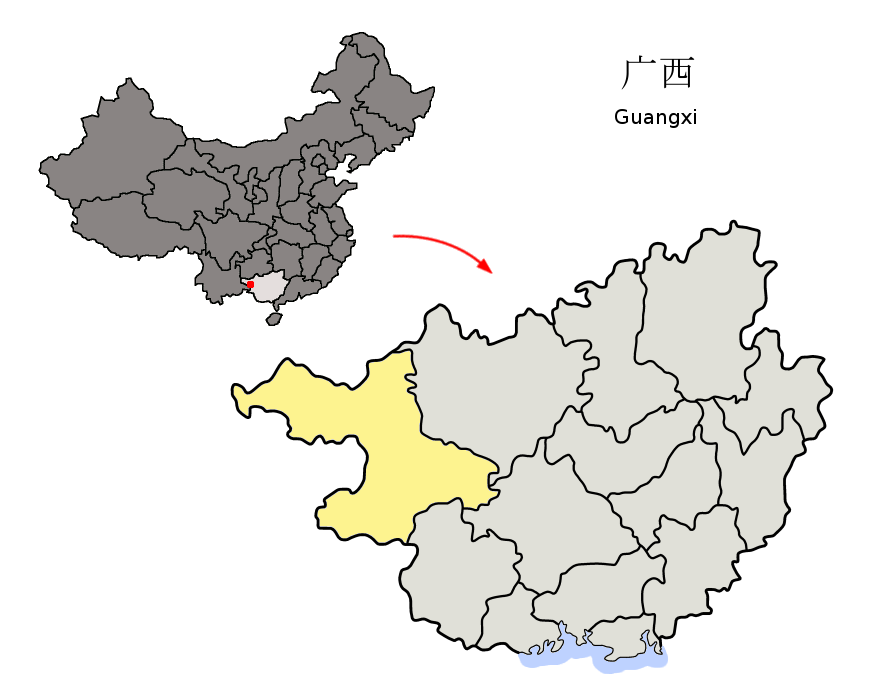
Location of Baise in the region

=== Youjiang District ===
Subdistricts:

- Baicheng Subdistrict (百城街道), Longjing Subdistrict (龙景街道)

Towns:

- Yangxu (阳圩镇), Sitang (四塘镇), Longchuan (龙川镇)

Townships:

- Yongle Township (永乐乡), Daleng Township (大楞乡), Panshui Township (泮水乡), Wangdian Yao Ethnic Township (汪甸瑶族乡)

=== Debao County ===
Towns:

- Chengguan (城关镇), Longdie (隆桑镇), Jingde (敬德镇), Zurong (足荣镇), Ma'ai (马隘镇)

Townships:

- Du'an Township (都安乡), Najia Township (那甲乡), Ronghua Township (荣华乡), Yandong Township (燕峒乡), Longguang Township (龙光乡), Batou Township (巴头乡), Dongling Township (东凌乡)

=== Jingxi County ===
Towns:

- Xinjing (新靖镇), Huadong (化峒镇), Hurun (湖润镇), Ande (安德镇), Youlin (龙临镇), Quyang (渠洋镇), Yuexu (岳圩镇), Longbang (龙邦镇), Wuping (武平)

Townships:

- Tongde Township (同德乡), Renzhuang Township (壬庄乡), Anning Township (安宁乡), Dizhou Township (地州乡), Ludong Township (禄峒乡), Nanpo Township (南坡乡), Tianpan Township (吞盘乡), Guole Township (果乐乡), Xinjia Township (新甲乡), Kuiwei Township (魁圩乡)

=== Leye County ===
Towns:

- Tongle (同乐镇), Gantian (甘田镇), Xinhua (新化镇), Huaping (花坪镇)

Townships:

- Luosha Township (逻沙乡), Luoxi Township (逻西乡), Youping Township (幼平乡), Yachang Township (雅长乡)

=== Lingyun County ===
Towns:

- Sicheng (泗城镇), Luolou (逻楼镇), Jiayou (加尤镇)

Townships:

- Xiajia Township (下甲乡), Lingzhan Yao Ethnic Township (伶站瑶族乡), Chaoli Yao Ethnic Township (朝里瑶族乡), Shali Yao Ethnic Township (沙里瑶族乡), Yuhong Yao Ethnic Township (玉洪瑶族乡)

=== Longlin Various Nationalities Autonomous County ===
Towns:

- Xinzhou (新州镇), Yacha (桠杈镇), Tianshengqiao (天生桥镇), Pingban (平班镇), De'e (德峨镇)

Townships:

- Shali Township (沙梨乡), Longhuo Township (隆或乡), Zhebao Township (者保乡), Zhelang Township (者浪乡), Gebu Township (革步乡), Jinzhongshan Township (金钟山乡), Zhuchang Township (猪场乡), Shechang Township (蛇场乡), Kechang Township (克长乡), Yancha Township (岩茶乡), Jieyan Township (介廷乡)

=== Napo County ===
Towns:

- Chengxiang (城厢镇), Pingmeng (平孟镇)

Townships:

- Pohe Township (坡荷乡), Longhe Township (龙合乡), Delong Township (德隆乡), Baihe Township (百合乡), Bainan Township (百南乡), Baisheng Township (百省乡), Baidu Township (百都乡)

=== Pingguo County ===
Towns:

- Matou (马头镇), Xin'an (新安镇), Guohua (果化镇), Taiping (太平镇), Pozao (坡造镇), Sitang (四塘镇), Jiucheng (旧城镇), Bangxu (榜圩镇)

Townships:

- Haicheng Township (海城乡), Fengwu Township (风梧乡), Liming Township (黎明乡), Tonglao Township (同老乡)

=== Tiandong County ===
Towns:

- Pingma (平马镇), Xiangzhou (祥周镇), Linfeng (林逢镇), Silin (思林镇), Yincha (印茶镇), Jiangcheng (江城镇), Shuoliang (朔良镇), Yixu (义圩镇), Naba (那拔镇)

The only township is Zuodeng Yao Ethnic Township (作登瑶族乡)

=== Tianlin County ===
Towns:

- Leli (乐里镇), Jiuzhou (旧州镇), Ding'an (定安镇), Liulong (六隆镇)

Townships:

- Pingtang Township (平塘乡), Langping Township (浪平乡), Nabi Township (那比乡), Gaolong Township (高龙乡), Baile Township (百乐乡), Zhemiao Township (者苗乡), Lucheng Yao Ethnic Township (潞城瑶族乡), Lizhou Yao Ethnic Township (利周瑶族乡), Bagui Yao Ethnic Township (八桂瑶族乡), Badu Yao Ethnic Township (八渡瑶族乡)

=== Tianyang County ===
Towns:

- Tianzhou (田州镇), Napo (那坡镇), Pohong (坡洪镇), Naman (那满镇), Baiyu (百育镇), Yufeng (玉凤镇), Toutang (头塘镇)

Townships:

- Dongjing Township (洞靖乡), Babie Township (巴别乡), Wucun Township (五村乡)

=== Xilin County ===
Towns:

- Bada (八达镇), Guzhang (古障镇)

Townships:

- Mabang Township (马蚌乡), Xiping Township (西平乡), Nalao Township (那劳乡), Nazuo Miao Ethnic Township (那佐苗族乡), Puhe Miao Ethnic Township (普合苗族乡), Zubie Yao and Miao Ethnic Township (足别瑶族苗族乡)

== Beihai ==
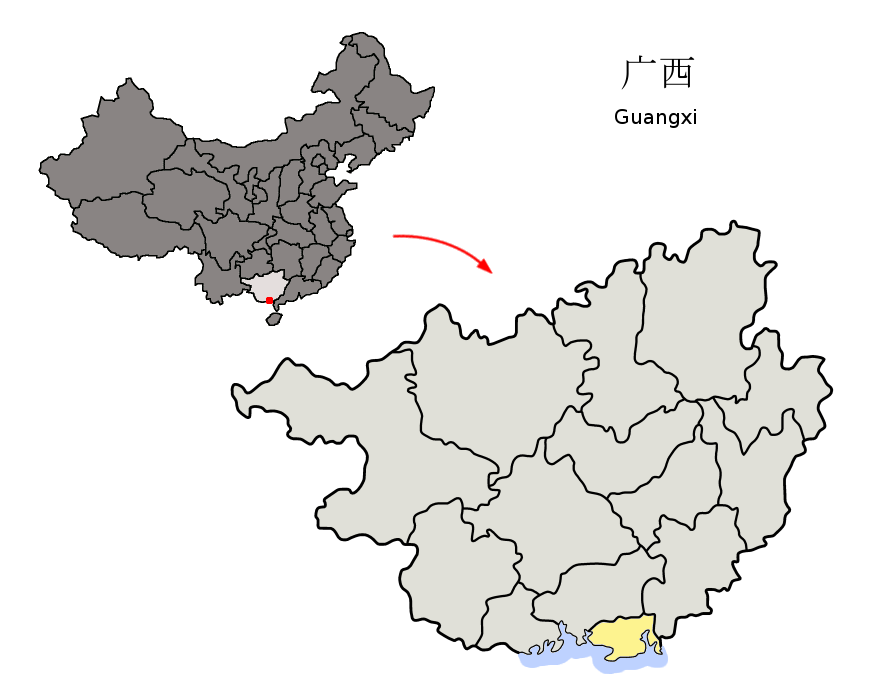
Location of Beihai in the region

=== Haicheng District ===
Subdistricts:

- Zhongjie Subdistrict (中街街道), Dongjie Subdistrict (东街街道), Xijie Subdistrict (西街街道), Haijiao Subdistrict (海角街道), Dijiao Subdistrict (地角街道), Gaode Subdistrict (高德街道), Yima Subdistrict (驿马街道)

The only town is Weizhou (涠洲镇)

=== Tieshangang District ===
Towns:

- Nankang (南康镇), Yingpan (营盘镇), Xinggang (兴港镇)

=== Yinhai District ===
Towns:

- Fucheng (福成镇), Yintan (银滩镇), Pingyang (平阳镇), Qiaogang (侨港镇), Gaode (高德镇), Xitang (西塘镇), Xiantian (咸田镇)

=== Hepu County ===
Towns:

- Lianzhou (廉州镇), Dangjiang (党江镇), Xichang (西场镇), Shagang (沙岗镇), Wujia (乌家镇), Zhakou (闸口镇), Gongguan (公馆镇), Baisha (白沙镇), Shankou (山口镇), Shatian (沙田镇), Shiwan (石湾镇), Shikang (石康镇), Changle (常乐镇)

Townships:

- Quzhang Township (曲樟乡), Xingdaohu Township (星岛湖乡)

== Chongzuo ==
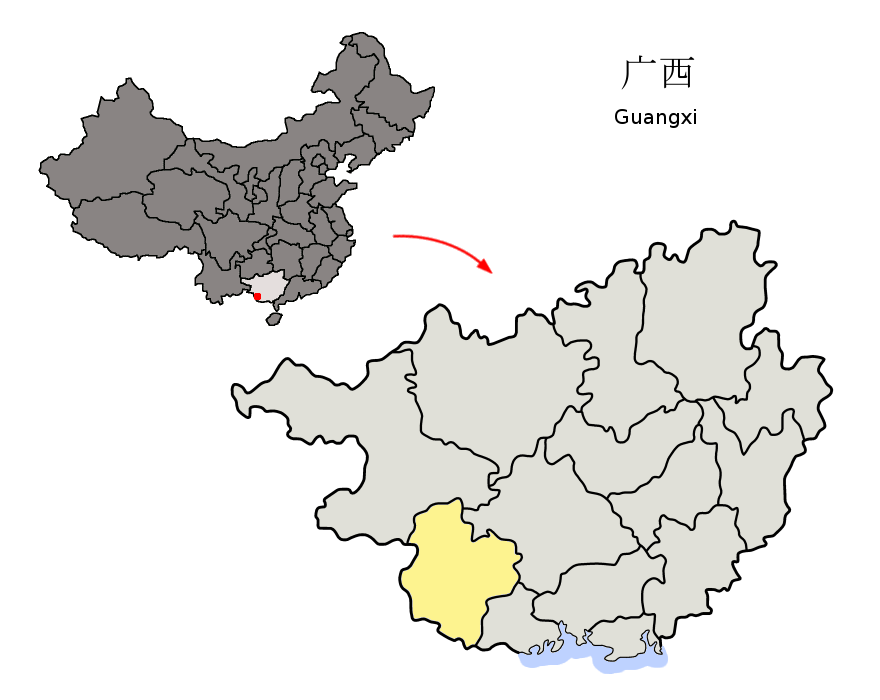
Location of Chongzuo in the region

=== Jiangzhou District ===
Towns:

- Taiping (太平镇), Xinhe (新和镇), Laituan (濑湍镇), Jiangzhou Town (江州镇), Zuozhou (左州镇), Nalong (那隆镇), Tuolu (驮卢镇)

Townships:

- Luobai Township (罗白乡), Banli Township (板利乡)

=== Pingxiang ===
Towns:

- Pingxiang (凭祥镇), Youyi (友谊镇), Shangshi (上石镇), Xiashi (夏石镇)

=== Daxin County ===
Towns:

- Taocheng (桃城镇), Quanming (全茗镇), Leiping (雷平镇), Shuolong (硕龙镇), Xialei (下雷镇)

Townships:

- Wushan Township (五山乡), Longmen Township (龙门乡), Changming Township (昌明乡), Fulong Township (福隆乡), Naling Township (那岭乡), Encheng Township (恩城乡), Lanwei Township (榄圩乡), Baowei Township (宝圩乡), Kanwei Township (堪圩乡)

=== Fusui County ===
Towns:

- Xinning (新宁镇), Quli (渠黎镇), Qujiu (渠旧镇), Liuqiao (柳桥镇), Dongmen (东门镇), Shanxu (山圩镇), Zhongdong (中东镇), Dongluo (东罗镇)

Townships:

- Longtou Township (龙头乡), Bapen Township (岜盆乡), Changping Township (昌平乡)

=== Longzhou County ===
Towns:

- Longzhou (龙州镇), Xiadong (下冻镇), Shuikou (水口镇), Jinlong (金龙镇), Xiangshui (响水镇)

Townships:

- Bajiao Township (八角乡), Shangjiang Township (上降乡), Binqiao Township (彬桥乡), Shanglong Township (上龙乡), Wude Township (武德乡), Zhuibu Township (逐卜乡), Shangjin Township (上金乡)

=== Ningming County ===
Towns:

- Chengzhong (城中镇), Aidian (爱店镇), Mingjiang (明江镇), Haiyuan (海渊镇)

Townships:

- Tingliang Township (亭亮乡), Zhai'an Township (寨安乡), Zhilang Township (峙浪乡), Dong'an Township (东安乡), Bangun Township (板棍乡), Beijiang Township (北江乡), Tongmian Township (桐棉乡), Nakan Township (那堪乡), Nanan Township (那楠乡)

=== Tiandeng County ===
Towns:

- Tiandeng Town (天等镇), Longming (龙茗镇), Jinjie (进结镇), Xiangdu (向都镇)

Townships:

- Dukang Township (都康乡), Ninggan Township (宁干乡), Tuokan Township (驮堪乡), Fuxin Township (福新乡), Dongping Township (东平乡), Jinyuan Township (进远乡), Shangying Township (上映乡), Bahe Township (把荷乡), Xiaoshan Township (小山乡)

== Fangchenggang ==
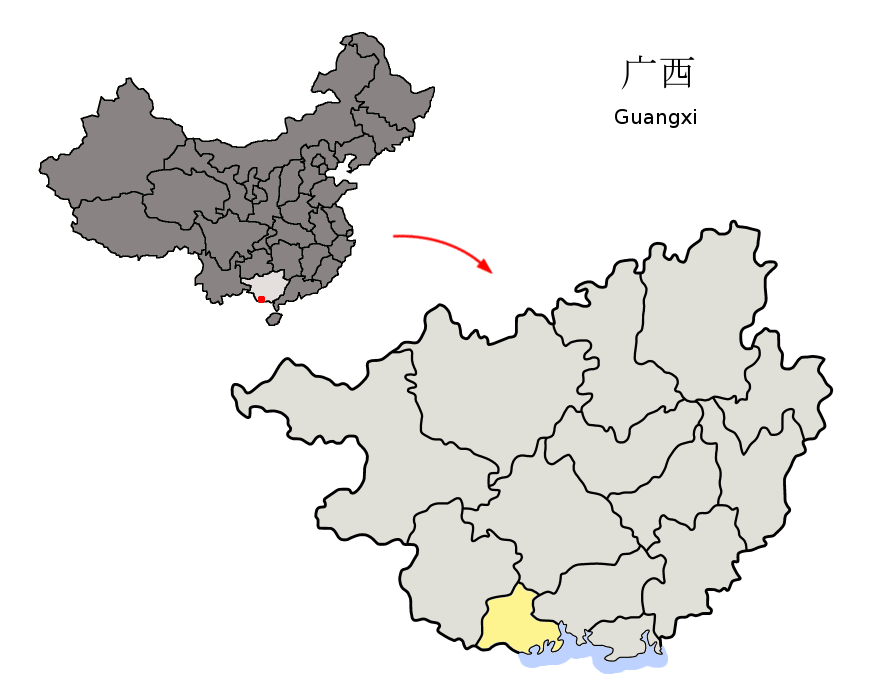
Location of Fangchenggang in the region

=== Fangcheng District ===
Towns:

- Fangcheng (防城镇), Dalu (大菉镇), Huashi (华石镇), Nasuo (那梭镇), Naliang (那良镇), Dongzhong (峒中镇)

Townships:

- Maoling Township (茅岭乡), Fulong Township (扶隆乡), Tanying Township (滩营乡), Jiangshan Township (江山乡)

=== Gangkou District ===
Subdistricts:

- Yuzhouping Subdistrict (渔洲坪街道), Baishawan Subdistrict (白沙万街道)

Towns:

- Qisha (企沙镇), Guangpo (光坡镇), Gongche (公车镇)

=== Dongxing ===
Towns:

- Dongxing (东兴镇), Jiangping (江平镇), Malu (马路镇)

=== Shangsi County ===
Towns:

- Siyang (思阳镇), Zaisha (在妙镇)

Townships:

- Jiao'an Township (叫安乡), Hualan Township (华兰乡), Pingfu Township (平福乡), Naqin Township (那琴乡), Gongzheng Township (公正乡), Nanping Yao Ethnic Township (南屏瑶族乡)

== Guigang ==
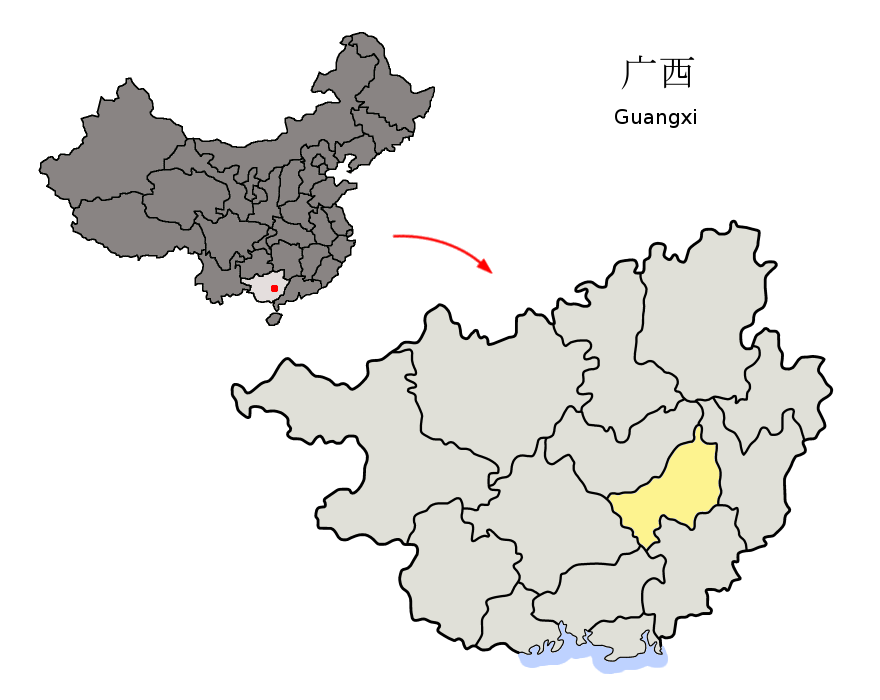
Location of Guigang in the region

=== Gangbei District ===
The only subdistrict is Guicheng Subdistrict (贵城街道)

Towns:

- Gangcheng (港城镇), Daxu (大圩镇), Qingfeng (庆丰镇)

Townships:

- Qishi Township (奇石乡), Zhongli Township (中里乡), Genzhu Township (根竹乡), Wule Township (武乐乡)

=== Gangnan District ===
The only subdistrict is Jiangnan Subdistrict (江南街道)

Towns:

- Qiaoxu (桥圩镇), Muge (木格镇), Muzi (木梓镇), Zhanjiang (湛江镇), Dongjin (东津镇), Batang (八塘镇)

Townships:

- Xintang Township (新塘乡), Watang Township (瓦塘乡)

=== Qintang District ===
Towns:

- Qintang Town (覃塘镇), Donglong (东龙镇), Sanli (三里镇), Huanglian (黄练镇), Shika (石卡镇), Wuli (五里镇)

Townships:

- Shanbei Township (山北乡), Zhangmu Township (樟木乡), Menggong Township (蒙公乡), Daling Township (大岭乡)

=== Guiping ===
Towns:

- Mule (木乐镇), Mugui (木圭镇), Shizui (石嘴镇), Youma (油麻镇), Shepo (社坡镇), Luoxiu (罗秀镇), Madong (麻垌镇), Shebu (社步镇), Xiawan (下湾镇), Mugen (木根镇), Zhongsha (中沙镇), Dayang (大洋镇), Dawan (大湾镇), Baisha (白沙镇), Shilong (石龙镇), Mengxu (蒙圩镇), Nanmu (南木镇), Jiangkou (江口镇), Jintian (金田镇), Zijing (紫荆镇), Xishan (西山镇)

Townships:

- Mapi Township (马皮乡), Xunwang Township (寻旺乡), Luobo Township (罗播乡), Houlu Township (厚禄乡), Dongxin Township (垌心乡)

=== Pingnan County ===
Towns:

- Pingnan (平南镇), Pingshan (平山镇), Simian (寺面镇), Liuchen (六陈镇), Daxin (大新镇), Da'an (大安镇), Wulin (武林镇), Dapo (大坡镇), Dazhou (大洲镇), Zhenlong (镇隆镇), Shangdu (上渡镇), Huancheng (环城镇), Anhuai (安怀镇), Danzhu (丹竹镇), Guancheng (官成镇), Siwang (思旺镇), Dapeng (大鹏镇), Tonghe (同和镇)

Townships:

- Donghua Township (东华乡), Sijie Township (思界乡), Guo'an Yao Ethnic Township (国安瑶族乡), Malian Yao Ethnic Township (马练瑶族乡)

== Guilin ==
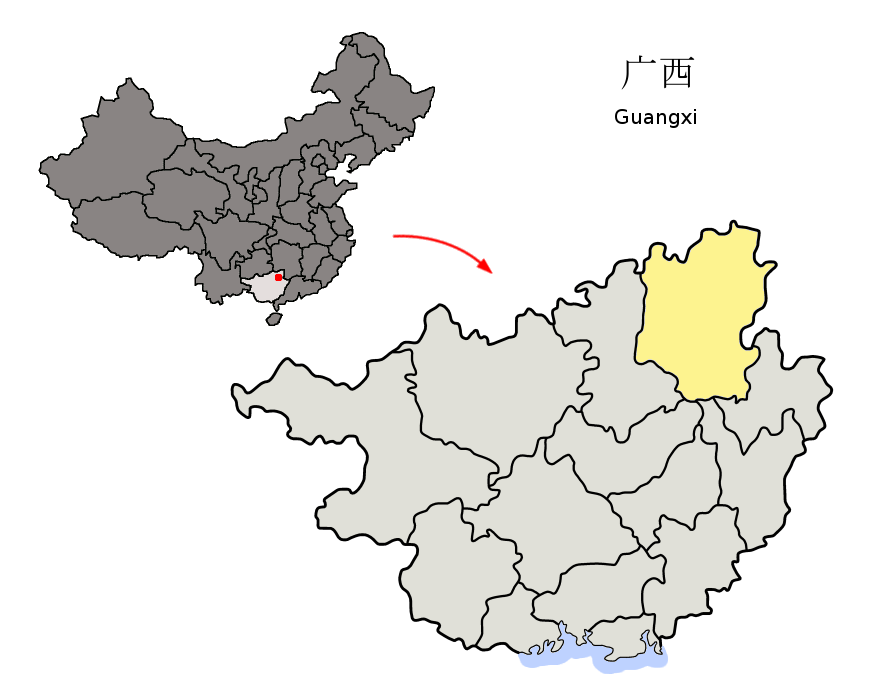
Location of Guilin in the region

=== Diecai District ===
Subdistricts:

- Diecai Subdistrict (叠彩街道), Beimen Subdistrict (北门街道)

The only township is Dahe Township (大河乡)

=== Qixing District ===
Subdistricts:

- Qixing Subdistrict (七星街道), Dongjiang Subdistrict, Guilin (东江街道), Chuanshan Subdistrict (穿山街道), Lidong Subdistrict (漓东街道)

The only township is Chaoyang Township(朝阳乡)

=== Xiangshan District ===
Subdistricts:

- Nanmen Subdistrict (南门街道), Xiangshan Subdistrict (象山街道), Pingshan Subdistrict (平山街道)

The only township is Ertang Township (二塘乡)

=== Xiufeng District ===
Subdistricts:

- Xiufeng Subdistrict (秀峰街道), Lijun Subdistrict (丽君街道), Jiashan Subdistrict (甲山街道)

=== Yanshan District ===
The only subdistrict is Yanshan Subdistrict (雁山街道)

Towns:

- Yanshan (雁山镇), Zhemu (柘木镇)

Townships:

- Dabu Township (大埠乡), Caoping Hui Ethnic Township (草坪回族乡)

=== Gongcheng Yao Autonomous County ===
Towns:

- Gongcheng (恭城镇), Limu (栗木镇), Lianhua (莲花镇)

Townships:

- Ping'an Township (平安乡), Sanjiang Township (三江乡), Jiahui Township (嘉会乡), Xiling Township (西岭乡), Guanyin Township (观音乡), Longhu Township (龙虎乡)

=== Guanyang County ===
Towns:

- Guanyang (灌阳镇), Huangguan (黄关镇), Wenshi (文市镇)

Townships:

- Guanyinge Township (观音阁乡), Xinjie Township (新街乡), Xinxu Township (新圩乡), Shuiche Township (水车乡)

=== Lingchuan County ===
Towns:

- Lingchuan (灵川镇), Daxu (大圩镇), Dingjiang (定江镇), Sanjie (三街镇), Tanxia (潭下镇), Qingshitan (青狮潭镇)

Townships:

- Chaotian Township (潮田乡), Haiyang Township (海洋乡), Lingtian Township (灵田乡)

=== Lingui County ===
Towns:

- Lingui Town (临桂镇), Liutang (六塘镇), Huixian (会仙镇), Liangjiang (两江镇), Wutong (五通镇)

Townships:

- Sitang Township (四塘乡), Chadong Township (茶洞乡), Zhongyong Township (中庸乡), Nanbianshan Township (南边山乡), Wantian Yao Ethnic Township (宛田瑶族乡), Huangsha Yao Ethnic Township (黄沙瑶族乡)

=== Lipu County ===
Towns:

- Licheng (荔城镇), Dongchang (东昌镇), Xinping (新坪镇), Dumo (杜莫镇), Qingshan (青山镇), Xiuren (修仁镇), Datang (大塘镇), Huaze (花箦镇), Shuangjiang (双江镇), Maling (马岭镇)

Townships:

- Longhuai Township (龙怀乡), Chacheng Township (茶城乡), Pulu Yao Ethnic Township (蒲芦瑶族乡)

=== Longsheng Various Nationalities Autonomous County ===
Towns:

- Longsheng (龙胜镇), Piaoli (瓢里镇), Sanmen (三门镇)

Townships:

- Heping Township (和平乡), Sishui Township (泗水乡), Wangdi Township (江底乡), Madi Township (马堤乡), Weijiang Township (伟江乡), Pingdeng Township (平等乡), Lejiang Township (乐江乡)

=== Pingle County ===
Towns:

- Pingle (平乐镇), Ertang (二塘镇), Shazi (沙子镇), Tong'an (同安镇), Zhangjia (张家镇), Yuantou (源头镇)

Townships:

- Yang'an Township (阳安乡), Qinglong Township (青龙乡), Qiaoting Township (桥亭乡)

=== Quanzhou County ===
Towns:

- Quanzhou (全州镇), Shitang (石塘镇), Miaotou (庙头镇), Wenqiao (文桥镇), Shaoshui (绍水镇), Longshui (龙水镇), Caiwan (才湾镇), Daxijiang (大西江镇), Huangshahe (黄沙河镇)

Townships:

- Yongsui Township (永岁乡), Jiantang Township (枧塘乡), Xianshui Township (咸水乡), Fenghuang Township (凤凰乡), Anhe Township (安和乡), Lianghe Township (两河乡), Baibao Township (白宝乡), Jiaojiang Yao Ethnic Township (蕉江瑶族乡), Dongshan Yao Ethnic Township (东山瑶族乡)

=== Xing'an County ===
Towns:

- Xing'an (兴安镇), Xiangli (湘漓镇), Jieshou (界首镇), Gaoshang (高尚镇), Yanguan (严关镇), Rongjiang (溶江镇)

Townships:

- Mochuan Township (漠川乡), Baishi Township (白石乡), Cuijia Township (崔家乡), Huajiang Yao Ethnic Township (华江瑶族乡)

=== Yangshuo County ===
Towns:

- Yangshuo (阳朔镇), Baisha (白沙镇), Fuli (福利镇), Xingping (兴坪镇), Putao (葡萄镇), Gaotian (高田镇)

Townships:

- Jinbao Township (金宝乡), Puyi Township (普益乡), Yangdi Township (杨堤乡)

=== Yongfu County ===
Towns:

- Yongfu (永福镇), Luojin (罗锦镇), Baishou (百寿镇), Suqiao (苏桥镇)

Townships:

- Baoli Township (堡里乡), Guangfu Township (广福乡), Sanhuang Township (三皇乡), Yong'an Township (永安乡), Longjiang Township (龙江乡)

=== Ziyuan County ===
The only town is Ziyuan (资源镇)

Townships:

- Zhongfeng Township (中峰乡), Meixi Township (梅溪乡), Guali Township (瓜里乡)

== Hechi ==
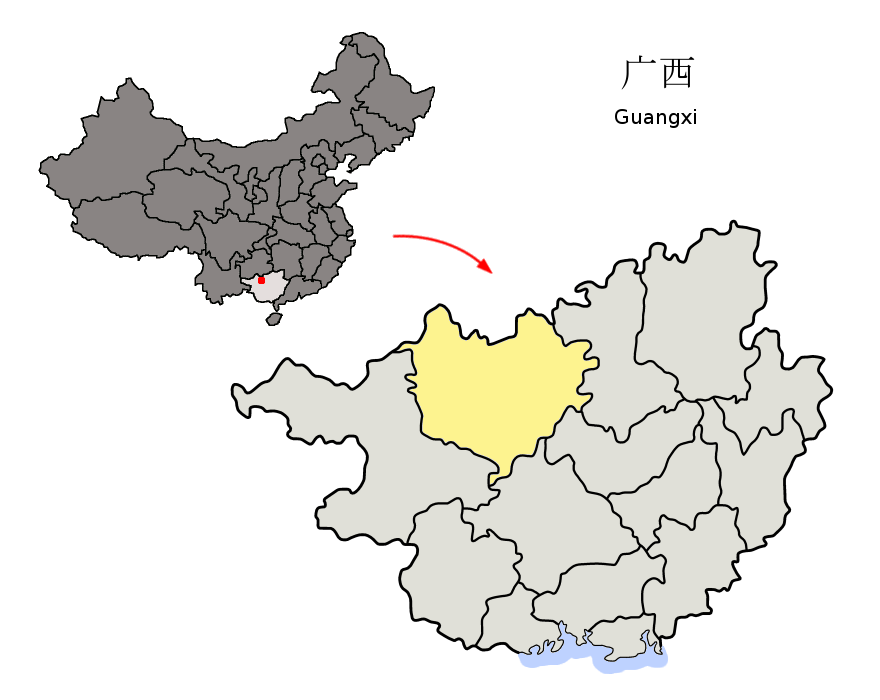
Location of Hechi in the region

=== Jinchengjiang District ===
The only subdistrict is Jinchengjiang Subdistrict (金城江街道)

Towns:

- Dongjiang (东江镇), Liuxu (六圩镇), Liujia (六甲镇), Hechi Town (河池镇), Bagong (拔贡镇), Jiuxu (九圩镇), Wuxu (五圩镇)

Townships:

- Baitu Township (白土乡), Celing Township (侧岭乡), Baoping Township (保平乡), Changlao Township (长老乡)

=== Yizhou ===
Towns:

- Qingyuan (庆远镇), Sancha (三岔镇), Luoxi (洛西镇), Huaiyuan (怀远镇), Desheng (德胜镇), Shibie (石别镇), Beishan (北山镇)

Townships:

- Xiangjian Township (祥贝乡), Liusanjie Township (刘三姐乡), Pingnan Township (屏南乡), Luodong Township (洛东乡), Fulong Yao Ethnic Township (福龙瑶族乡), Beiya Yao Ethnic Township (北牙瑶族乡), Tongde Township (同德乡), Anma Township (安马乡), Longtou Township (龙头乡)

=== Bama Yao Autonomous County ===
The only town is Bama (巴马镇)

Townships:

- Yandong Township (燕洞乡), Jiazhuan Township (甲篆乡), Nashe Township (那社乡), Suolue Township (所略乡), Xishan Township (西山乡), Dongshan Township (东山乡), Fenghuang Township (凤凰乡), Bailin Township (百林乡), Natao Township (那桃乡)

=== Dahua Yao Autonomous County ===
Towns:

- Dahua (大化镇), Duyang (都阳镇), Yantan (岩滩镇), Beijing (北景镇)

Townships:

- Gonghe Township (共和乡), Gongchuan Township (贡川乡), Baima Township (百马乡), Guhe Township (古河乡), Guwen Township (古文乡), Jiangnan Township (江南乡), Qiangwei Township (羌圩乡), Yiwei Township (乙圩乡), Bansheng Township (板升乡), Qibainong Township (七百弄乡), Yalong Township (雅龙乡), Liuye Township (六也乡)

=== Donglan County ===
Towns:

- Donglan Town (东兰镇), Aidong (隘洞镇), Changle (长乐镇), Sanshi (三石镇), Wuzhuan (武篆镇)

Townships:

- Simeng Township (泗孟乡), Lanmu Township (兰木乡), Changjiang Township (长江乡), Bachou Township (巴畴乡), Jingu Township (金谷乡), Datong Township (大同乡), Huaxiang Township (花香乡), Chuxue Township (切学乡), Sannong Yao Ethnic Township (三弄瑶族乡)

=== Du'an Yao Autonomous County ===
Towns:

- Anyang (安阳镇), Gaoling (高岭镇), Daxing (大兴镇)

Townships:

- Chengjiang Township (澄江乡), Disu Township (地苏乡), Dongmiao Township (东庙乡), Xia'ao Township (下坳乡), Longfu Township (隆福乡), Bao'an Township (保安乡), Banling Township (板岭乡), Yong'an Township (永安乡), Sanzhiyang Township (三只羊乡), Longwan Township (龙湾乡), Jingsheng Township (菁盛乡), Lalie Township (拉烈乡), Baiwang Township (百旺乡), Jiagui Township (加贵乡), Laren Township (拉仁乡), Jiudu Township (九渡乡)

=== Fengshan County ===
The only town is Fengcheng (凤城镇)

Townships:

- Paoli Township (袍里乡), Zhaiya Township (砦牙乡), Changzhou Township (长洲乡), Qiaoyin Township (乔音乡), Zhongting Township (中亭乡), Jinya Yao Ethnic Township (金牙瑶族乡), Pingle Yao Ethnic Township (平乐瑶族乡), Jiangzhou Yao Ethnic Township (江洲瑶族乡)

=== Huanjiang Maonan Autonomous County ===
Towns:

- Si'en (思恩镇), Shuiyuan (水源镇), Luoyang (洛阳镇), Chuanshan (川山镇), Minglun (明伦镇), Dongxing (东兴镇)

Townships:

- Dacai Township (大才乡), Xianan Township (下南乡), Da'an Township (大安乡), Changmei Township (长美乡), Longyan Township (龙岩乡), Xunle Miao Ethnic Township (驯乐苗族乡)

=== Luocheng Mulao Autonomous County ===
Towns:

- Dongmen (东门镇), Long'an (龙岸镇), Huangjin (黄金镇), Xiaochang'an (小长安镇), Siba (四把镇), Tianhe (天河镇), Huaiqun (怀群镇)

Townships:

- Baotan Township (宝坛乡), Qiaoshan Township (乔善乡), Naweng Township (纳翁乡), Jian'ai Township (兼爱乡)

=== Nandan County ===
Towns:

- Chengguan (城关镇), Dachang (大厂镇), Chehe (车河镇), Mangchang (芒场镇), Liuzhai (六寨镇), Yueli (月里镇), Wu'ai (吾隘镇)

Townships:

- Luofu Township (罗富乡), Zhongbao Miao Ethnic Township (中堡苗族乡), Bawei Yao Ethnic Township (八圩瑶族乡), Lihu Yao Ethnic Township (里湖瑶族乡)

=== Tian'e County ===
Towns:

- Liupai (六排镇), Xiangyang (向阳镇)

Townships:

- Bamu Township (岜暮乡), Nazhi Township (纳直乡), Gengxin Township (更新乡), Xialao Township (下老乡), Pojie Township (坡结乡), Sanbao Township (三堡乡), Bala Yao Ethnic Township (八腊瑶族乡)

== Hezhou ==
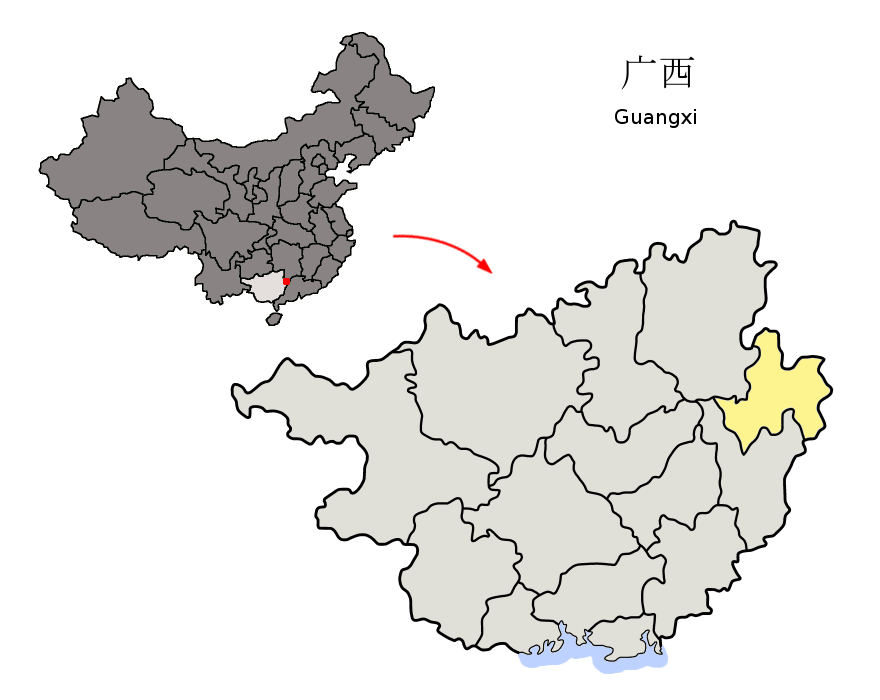
Location of Hezhou in the region

=== Babu District ===
Subdistricts:

- Babu Subdistrict (八步街道), Xiwan Subdistrict (西湾街道), Jiangnan Subdistrict (江南街道), Chengdong Subdistrict (城东街道)

Towns:

- Hejie (贺街镇), Butou (步头镇), Liantang (莲塘镇), Daning (大宁镇), Nanxiang (南乡镇), Gualing (桂岭镇), Kaishan (开山镇), Huangtian (黄田镇), Lisong (里松镇), Etang (鹅塘镇), Shatian (沙田镇), Gonghui (公会镇), Shuikou (水口镇), Xindu (信都镇), Lingfeng (灵峰镇), Renyi (仁义镇), Pumen (铺门镇)

Townships:

- Huangdong Yao Ethnic Township (黄洞瑶族乡), Daping Yao Ethnic Township (大平瑶族乡)

=== Fuchuan Yao Autonomous County ===
Towns:

- Fuyang (富阳镇), Baisha (白沙镇), Lianshan (莲山镇), Gucheng (古城镇), Fuli (福利镇), Mailing (麦岭镇), Gepo (葛坡镇), Chengbei (城北镇), Chaodong (朝东镇)

Townships:

- Xinhua Township (新华乡), Shijia Township (石家乡), Liujia Township (柳家乡)

=== Zhaoping County ===
Towns:

- Zhaoping (昭平镇), Wenzhu (文竹镇), Huangyao (黄姚镇), Fuluo (富罗镇), Beituo (北陀镇), Majiang (马江镇), Wujiang (五将镇)

Townships:

- Zouma Township (走马乡), Zhangmulin Township (樟木林乡), Fenghuang Township (凤凰乡), Muge Township (木格乡), Xianhui Yao Ethnic Township (仙回瑶族乡)

=== Zhongshan County ===
Towns:

- Zhongshan (钟山镇), Chengxiang (城厢镇), Wanggao (望高镇), Yangtou (羊头镇), Huilong (回龙镇), Shilong (石龙镇), Fengxiang (凤翔镇), Shanhu (珊瑚镇), Tonggu (同古镇), Gong'an (公安镇), Yingjia (英家镇), Qingtang (清塘镇), Yantang (燕塘镇), Honghua (红花镇)

Townships:

- Huashan Yao Ethnic Township (花山瑶族乡), Liang'an Yao Ethnic Township (两安瑶族乡)

== Laibin ==
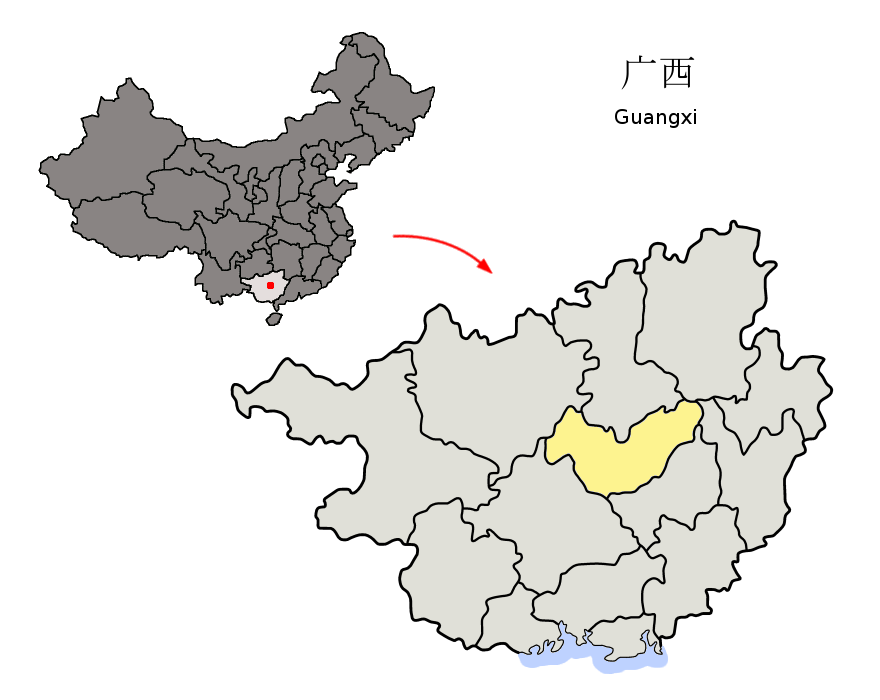
Location of Laibin in the region

=== Xingbin District ===
Subdistricts:

- Chengdong Subdistrict (城东街道), Chengbei Subdistrict (城北街道), Hexi Subdistrict (河西街道)

Towns:

- Fenghuang (凤凰镇), Liangjiang (良江镇), Xiaopingyang (小平阳镇), Qianjiang (迁江镇), Shiling (石陵镇), Pingyang (平阳镇)

Townships:

- Sanwu Township (三五乡), Wushan Township (五山乡), Taodeng Township (陶邓乡), Qiaogong Township (桥巩乡), Liangtang Township (良塘乡), Qidong Township (七洞乡), Chengxiang Township (城厢乡), Mengcun Township (蒙村乡), Sishan Township (寺山乡), Shiya Township (石牙乡), Nansi Township (南泗乡), Gao’an Township (高安乡), Dawan Township (大湾乡), Zhenglong Township (正龙乡)

=== Heshan ===
The only town is Lingnan (岭南镇)

Townships:

- Beisi Township (北泗乡), Heli Township (河里乡)

=== Jinxiu Yao Autonomous County ===
Towns:

- Jinxiu (金秀镇), Tongmu (桐木镇), Toupai (头排镇)

Townships:

- Sanjiao Township (三角乡), Zhongliang Township (忠良乡), Luoxiang Township (罗香乡), Changdong Township (长垌乡), Dazhang Township (大樟乡), Liuxiang Township (六巷乡), Sanjiang Township (三江乡)

=== Wuxuan County ===
Towns:

- Wuxuan (武宣镇), Tongling (桐岭镇), Tongwan (通挽镇), Dongxiang (东乡镇), Sanli (三里镇), Ertang (二塘镇), Huangmao (黄茆镇)

Townships:

- Luxin Township (禄新乡), Siling Township (思灵乡), Jinji Township (金鸡乡)

=== Xiangzhou County ===
Towns:

- Xiangzhou (象州镇), Shilong (石龙镇), Yunjiang (运江镇), Sicun (寺村镇), Zhongping (中平镇), Luoxiu (罗秀镇), Dale (大乐镇)

Townships:

- Maping Township (马坪乡), Shahuang Township (妙皇乡), Baizhang Township (百丈乡), Shuijin Township (水晶乡)

=== Xincheng County ===
Towns:

- Chengguan (城关镇), Datang (大塘镇), Silian (思练镇), Hongdu (红渡镇), Gupeng (古蓬镇)

Townships:

- Masi Township (马泗乡), Oudong Township (欧洞乡), Andong Township (安东乡), Guozhu Township (果遂乡), Xinxu Township (新圩乡), Zhuyi Township (遂意乡), Beigeng Township (北更乡)

== Liuzhou ==
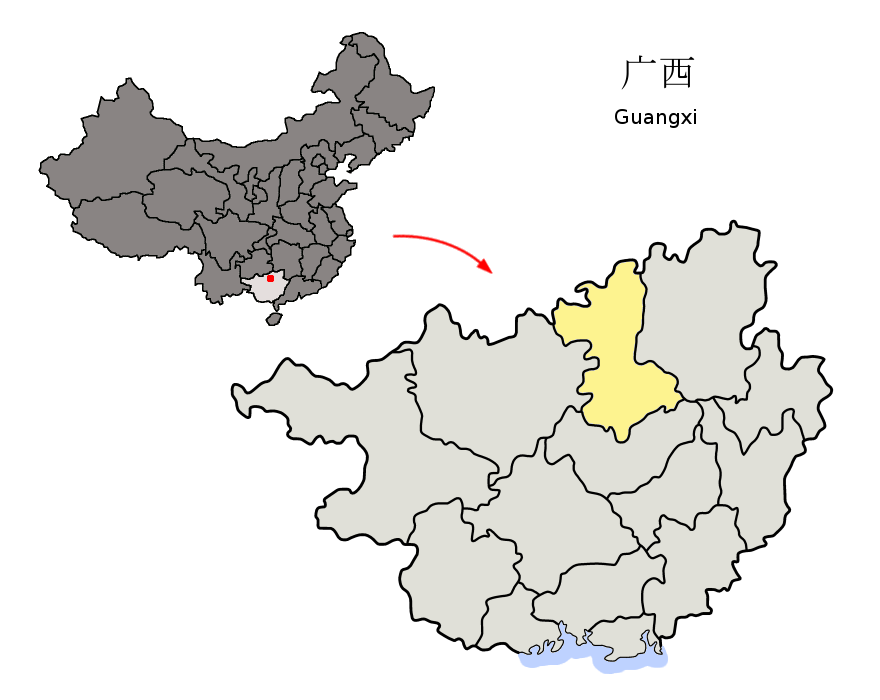
Location of Liuzhou in the region

=== Chengzhong District ===
Subdistricts:

- Chengzhong Subdistrict (城中街道), Gongyuan Subdistrict (公园街道), Zhongnan Subdistrict (中南街道), Shuishang Subdistrict (水上街道), Tanzhong Subdistrict (潭中街道), Hedong Subdistrict (河东街道), Jinglan Subdistrict (静兰街道)

=== Liubei District ===
Subdistricts:

- Jiefang Subdistrict (解放街道), Yaru Subdistrict (雅儒街道), Shengli Subdistrict (胜利街道), Que'ershan Subdistrict (雀儿山街道), Gangcheng Subdistrict (钢城街道), Jinxiu Subdistrict (锦绣街道), Bailu Subdistrict (白露街道), Liuchang Subdistrict (柳长街道), Shipai Subdistrict (石碑坪镇),

Towns:

- Shatang (沙塘镇), Changzhang (长塘镇), Luobu (洛埠镇)

=== Liunan District ===
Subdistricts:

- Hexi Subdistrict (河西街道), Nanzhan Subdistrict (南站街道), Eshan Subdistrict (鹅山街道), Liunan Subdistrict (柳南街道), Liushi Subdistrict (柳石街道), Yinshan Subdistrict (银山街道), Tanxi Subdistrict (潭西街道), Nanhuan Subdistrict (南环街道)

The only town is Taiyangcun (太阳村镇)

=== Yufeng District ===
Subdistricts:

- Tianma Subdistrict (天马街道), Jiahe Subdistrict (驾鹤街道), Jianpan Subdistrict (箭盘街道), Wuliting Subdistrict (五里亭街道), Rongjun Subdistrict (荣军街道), Bailian Subdistrict (白莲街道), Qilin Subdistrict (麒麟街道), Yanghe Subdistrict (阳和街道)

The only town is Luorong (雒容镇)

=== Liucheng County ===
Towns:

- Dapu (大埔镇), Longtou (龙头镇), Taiping (太平镇), Shapu (沙埔镇), Dongquan (东泉镇), Fengshan (凤山镇), Liutang (六塘镇), Chongyao (冲脉镇), Zhailong (寨隆镇)

Townships:

- Mashan Township (马山乡), Shechong Township (社冲乡), Guzhai Mulao Ethnic Township (古砦仫佬族乡)

=== Liujiang County ===
Towns:

- Labao (拉堡镇), Liyong (里雍镇), Baipeng (百朋镇), Chengyuan (成团镇), Luoman (洛满镇), Liushan (流山镇), Sandu (三都镇), Ligao (里高镇), Jiangde (进德镇), Chuanshan (穿山镇), Shibo (土博镇)

The only township is the Baisha Township (白沙乡)

=== Luzhai County ===
Towns:

- Luzhai (鹿寨镇), Zhongdu (中渡镇), Zhaisha (寨沙镇), Pingshan (平山镇)

Townships:

- Huangmian Township (黄冕乡), Jiangkou Township (江口乡), Daojiang Township (导江乡), Lagou Township (拉沟乡), Sipai Township (四排乡)

=== Rong'an County ===
Towns:

- Chang'an (长安镇), Fushi (浮石镇), Siding (泗顶镇), Banlan (板榄镇), Dajiang (大将镇), Daliang (大良镇)

Townships:

- Yayao Township (雅瑶乡), Dapo Township (大坡乡), Dongqi Township (东起乡), Shazi Township (沙子乡), Qiaoban Township (桥板乡), Tantou Township (潭头乡)

=== Rongshui Miao Autonomous County ===
Towns:

- Rongshui (融水镇), Hemu (和睦镇), Sanfang (三防镇), Huaibao (怀宝镇)

Townships:

- Yongle Township (永乐乡), Sirong Township (四荣乡), Xiangfen Township (香粉乡), Antai Township (安太乡), Dongtou Township (洞头乡), Wangdong Township (汪洞乡), Gandong Township (杆洞乡), Anchui Township (安陲乡), Dalang Township (大浪乡), Baiyun Township (白云乡), Hongshui Township (红水乡), Gongdong Township (拱洞乡), Liangzhai Township (良寨乡), Danian Township (大年乡), Tonglian Yao Ethnic Township (同练瑶族乡), Gunbei Dong Ethnic Township (滚贝侗族乡)

=== Sanjiang Dong Autonomous County ===
Towns:

- Guyi (古宜镇), Doujiang (斗江镇), Danzhou (丹洲镇)

Townships:

- Dudong Township (独峒乡), Bajiang Township (八江乡), Linxi Township (林溪乡), Meilin Township (梅林乡), Yangxi Township (洋溪乡), Liangkou Township (良口乡), Laobao Township (老堡乡), Heping Township (和平乡), Chengcun Township (程村乡), Tongle Miao Ethnic Township (同乐苗族乡), Fulu Miao Ethnic Township (富禄苗族乡), Gaoji Yao Ethnic Township (高基瑶族乡)

== Qinzhou ==
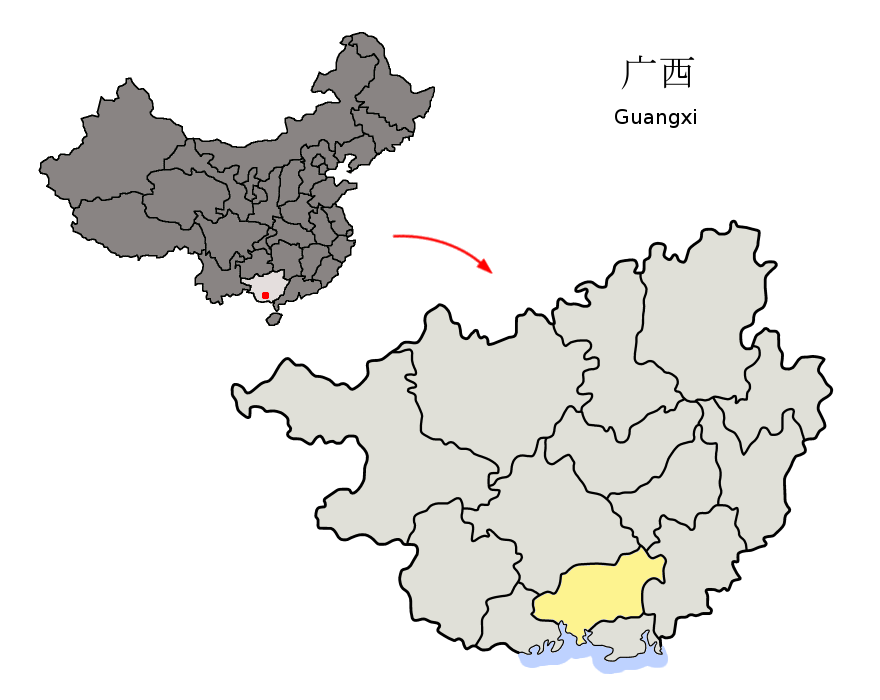
Location of Qinzhou in the region

=== Qinbei District ===
Towns:

- Dadong (大垌镇), Pingji (平吉镇), Qingtang (青塘镇), Xiaodong (小董镇), Bancheng (板城镇), Nameng (那蒙镇), Changtan (长滩镇), Xintang (新棠镇), Dazhi (大直镇), Dasi (大寺镇), Guitai (贵台镇)

=== Qinnan District ===
Subdistricts:

- Xiangyang Subdistrict (向阳街道), Shuidong Subdistrict (水东街道), Wenfeng Subdistrict (文峰街道), Nanzhu Subdistrict (南珠街道)

Towns:

- Shabu (沙埠镇), Kangxiling (康熙岭镇), Huangwutun (黄屋屯镇), Jianshan (尖山镇), Dafanpo (大番坡镇), Longmengang (龙门港镇), Xiniujiao (犀牛脚镇), Jiufeng (久隆镇), Dongchang (东场镇), Nali (那丽镇), Napeng (那彭镇), Nasi (那思镇)

=== Lingshan County ===
Towns:

- Lingcheng (灵城镇), Xinxu (新圩镇), Fengtang (丰塘镇), Pingshan (平山镇), Shitang (石塘镇), Fozi (佛子镇), Pingnan (平南镇), Yandun (烟墩镇), Tanxu (檀圩镇), Nalong (那隆镇), Sanlong (三隆镇), Luwu (陆屋镇), Jiuzhou (旧州镇), Taiping (太平镇), Shaping (沙坪镇), Wuli (武利镇), Wenli (文利镇), Bolao (伯劳镇)

=== Pubei County ===
Towns:

- Xiaojiang (小江镇), Quanshui (泉水镇), Shiyong (石埇镇), Anshi (安石镇), Zhanghuang (张黄镇), Dacheng (大成镇), Baishishui (白石水镇), Beitong (北通镇), Sanhe (三合镇), Longmen (龙门镇), Fuwang (福旺镇), Zhaixu (寨圩镇), Lemin (乐民镇), Liuyin (六垠镇), Pingmu (平睦镇), Guandong (官垌镇)

== Wuzhou ==
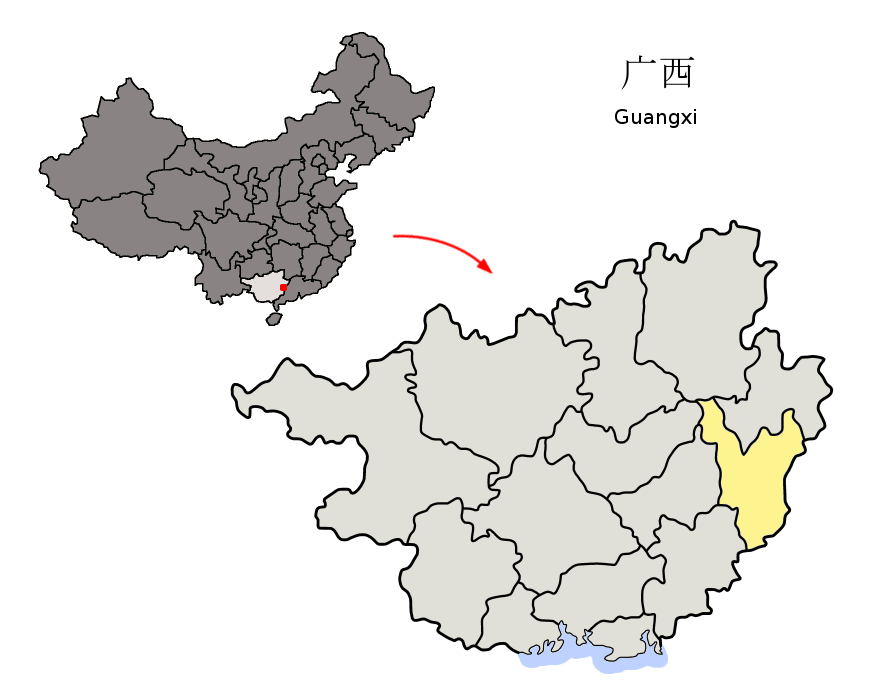
Location of Wuzhou in the region

=== Changzhou District ===
Subdistricts:

- Datang Subdistrict (大塘街道), Xinglong Subdistrict (兴龙街道)

Towns:

- Changzhou Town (长洲镇), Daoshui (倒水镇)

=== Dieshan District ===
Subdistricts:

- Jiaozui Subdistrict (角嘴街道), Dongxing Subdistrict (东兴街道), Fumin Subdistrict (富民街道)

Towns:

- Longhu (龙湖镇), Xiaying (夏郢镇)

=== Wanxiu District ===
Subdistricts:

- Chengdong Subdistrict (城东街道), Chengnan Subdistrict (城南街道), Chengzhong Subdistrict (城中街道), Chengbei Subdistrict (城北街道)

Towns:

- Chengdong Town (城东镇), Wangfu (旺甫镇)

=== Cenxi ===
Towns:

- Cencheng (岑城镇), Malu (马路镇), Nandu (南渡镇), Shuiwen (水汶镇), Dalong (大隆镇), Limu (黎木镇), Daye (大业镇), Jinzhu (筋竹镇), Chengjian (城谏镇), Guiyi (归义镇), Nuodong (糯垌镇), Anping (安平镇), Sanbao (三堡镇), Botang (波塘镇)

=== Cangwu County ===
Towns:

- Longxu (龙圩镇), Dapo (大坡镇), Guangping (广平镇), Xindi (新地镇), Lingjiao (岭脚镇), Jingnan (京南镇), Shizhai (狮寨镇), Liubao (六堡镇), Libu (梨埠镇), Mushuang (木双镇), Shiqiao (石桥镇), Shatou (沙头镇)

=== Mengshan County ===
Towns:

- Mengshan (蒙山镇), Xihe (西河镇), Xinxu (新圩镇), Wenxu (文圩镇), Huangcun (黄村镇), Chentang (陈塘镇)

Townships:

- Hanhao Township (汉豪乡), Changping Yao Ethnic Township (长坪瑶族乡), Xiayi Yao Ethnic Township (夏宜瑶族乡)

=== Teng County ===
Towns:

- Tengzhou (藤州镇), Tangbu (塘步镇), Langnan (琅南镇), Tongxin (同心镇), Jinji (金鸡镇), Xinqing (新庆镇), Xiangqi (象棋镇), Lingjing (岭景镇), Tianping (天平镇), Mengjiang (蒙江镇), Heping (和平镇), Taiping (太平镇), Gulong (古龙镇), Dongrong (东荣镇), Dali (大黎镇)

The only township is Pingfu Township (平福乡)

== Yulin ==
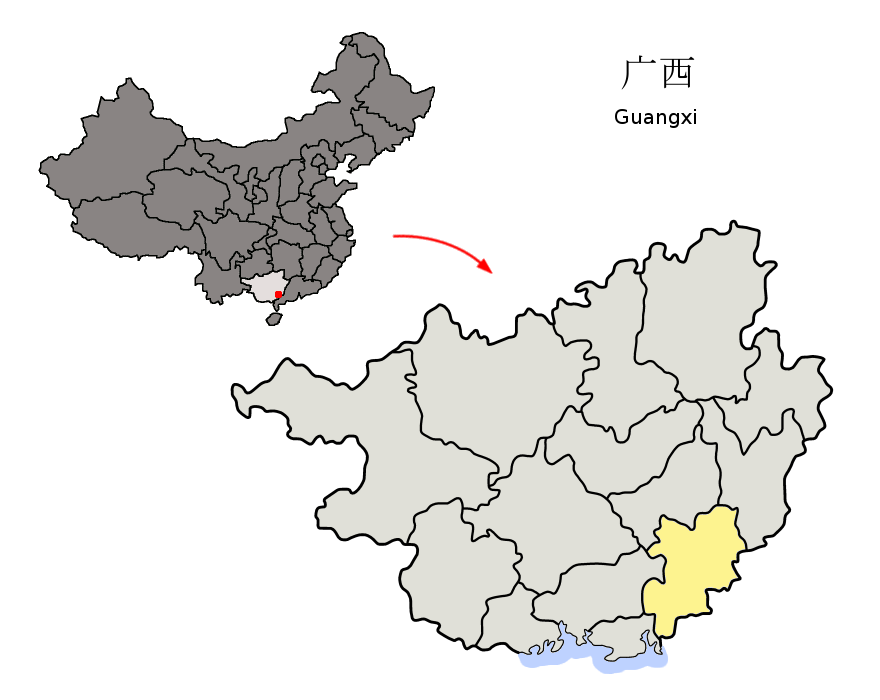
Location of Yulin in the region

=== Yuzhou District ===
Subdistricts:

- Yucheng Subdistrict (玉城街道), Nanjiang Subdistrict (南江街道), Chengxi Subdistrict (城西街道), Chengbei Subdistrict (城北街道), Mingshan Subdistrict (名山街道)

Towns:

- Datang (大塘镇), Maolin (茂林镇), Rendong (仁东镇), Fumian (福绵镇), Chengjun (成均镇), Zhangmu (樟木镇), Xinqiao (新桥镇), Shatian (沙田镇), Shihe (石和镇), Renhou (仁厚镇)

=== Beiliu ===
Subdistricts:

- Lingcheng Subdistrict (陵城街道), Chengnan Subdistrict (城南街道), Chengbei Subdistrict (城北街道)

Towns:

- Beiliu Town (北流镇), Xinrong (新荣镇), Min'an (民安镇), Shanwei (山围镇), Minle (民乐镇), Xiyin (西垠镇), Xinxu (新圩镇), Dali (大里镇), Tang'an (塘岸镇), Qingshuikou (清水口镇), Longsheng (隆盛镇), Dapowai (大坡外镇), Liuma (六麻镇), Xinfeng (新丰镇), Shadong (沙垌镇), Pingzheng (平政镇), Baima (白马镇), Dalun (大伦镇), Fuxin (扶新镇), Liujing (六靖镇), Shiwo (石窝镇), Qingwan (清湾镇)

=== Bobai County ===
Towns:

- Bobai (博白镇), Shuangfeng (双凤镇), Dungu (顿谷镇), Shuiming (水鸣镇), Nalin (那林镇), Jiangning (江宁镇), Santan (三滩镇), Huangling (黄凌镇), Yashan (亚山镇), Wangmao (旺茂镇), Dongping (东平镇), Shahe (沙河镇), Lingjiao (菱角镇), Xintian (新田镇), Fengshan (凤山镇), Ningtan (宁潭镇), Wendi (文地镇), Yingqiao (英桥镇), Nabu (那卜镇), Dadong (大垌镇), Shabei (沙陂镇), Shuangwang (双旺镇), Songwang (松旺镇), Longtan (龙潭镇), Daba (大坝镇), Yong'an (永安镇), Jingkou (径口镇)

The only township is Langping Township (浪平乡)

=== Luchuan County ===
Towns:

- Wenquan (温泉镇), Michang (米场镇), Mapo (马坡镇), Shanluo (珊罗镇), Pingle (平乐镇), Shapo (沙坡镇), Daqiao (大桥镇), Wushi (乌石镇), Liangtian, Luchuan (良田镇), Qinghu (清湖镇), Gucheng (古城镇)

Townships:

- Shahu Township (沙湖乡), Hengshan Township (横山乡), Tanmian Township (滩面乡)

=== Rong County ===
Towns:

- Rongzhou (容州镇), Yangmei (杨梅镇), Lingshan (灵山镇), Liuwang (六王镇), Licun (黎村镇), Yangcun (杨村镇), Xiandi (县底镇), Ziliang (自良镇), Songshan (松山镇), Luojiang (罗江镇), Shitou (石头镇), Shizhai (石寨镇)

Townships:

- Rongxi Township (容西乡), Shili Township (十里乡), Langshui Township (浪水乡)

=== Xingye County ===
Towns:

- Shinan (石南镇), Dapingshan (大平山镇), Kuiyang (葵阳镇), Chenghuang (城隍镇), Shanxin (山心镇), Shatang (沙塘镇), Putang (蒲塘镇), Beishi (北市镇), Long'an (龙安镇), Gaofeng (高峰镇), Xiaopingshan (小平山镇), Maijiu (卖酒镇)

The only township is Luoyang Township (洛阳乡)
