= Dalun =

Dalun may refer to the following locations:

- Dalun, Guangxi (大伦镇), town in Beiliu, Guangxi, China
- Dalun, Jiangsu (大伦镇), town in Jiangyan, Jiangsu, China
- Dalan, Khuzestan, also romanised Dālūn, village in Bagh-e Malek County, Khuzestan province, Iran
- Dalun, Kohgiluyeh and Boyer-Ahmad (دالون – Dālūn), village in Kohgiluyeh County, Kohgiluyeh and Boyer-Ahmad province, Iran
- Dalun Rural District, an administrative division of Margown County, Kohgiluyeh and Boyer-Ahmad province, Iran
