= Guanyinge =

Guanyinge (simplified Chinese: 观音阁; traditional Chinese: 觀音閣; pinyin: Guānyīngé; lit. 'Guanyin Temple') may refer to the following locations in China:

Towns

- Guanyinge, Xupu, in Xupu County, Hunan
- Guanyinge, Guangdong, in Boluo County

Township(s)

- Guanyinge Township, Guanyang County, Guangxi

Subdistricts

- Guanyinge Subdistrict, Beizhen, Liaoning
- Guanyinge Subdistrict, Benxi County, Liaoning
- Guanyinge Subdistrict, Jining, in Shizhong District, Jining, Shandong
