= Binyang =

Binyang may refer to:

- Binyang County, county in Guangxi, China
- 9723 Binyang, minor planet
