= Gongyuan Subdistrict =

Gongyuan Subdistrict (公园街道) may refer to the following locations in the PRC:

- Gongyuan Subdistrict, Huainan, in Tianjia'an District, Huainan, Anhui
- Gongyuan Subdistrict, Liuzhou, in Chengzhong District, Liuzhou, Guangxi
- Gongyuan Subdistrict, Cangzhou, in Yunhe District, Cangzhou, Hebei
- Gongyuan Subdistrict, Yanji, in Yanji, Jilin
- Gongyuan Subdistrict, Zibo, in Zhangdian District, Zibo, Shandong
