= Shuangwang =

Shuangwang may refer to:

- Shuangwang, Bobai County (双旺镇), a township-level division of Guangxi, China
- Shuangwang, Lulong County (双望镇), a township-level division of Hebei, China
