= Yantang =

Yantang may refer to the following locations in China:

- Yantang, Guangxi (燕塘镇), town in Zhongshan County
- Yantang, Chaling (严塘镇), town in Chaling County, Hunan
- Yantang, Xinshao (严塘镇), a town of Xinshao County, Hunan
