= Tonghe =

Tonghe may refer to:

- Tonghe (983–1012), era name used by Emperor Shengzong of Liao

== Places in China ==
- Tonghe County, Heilongjiang
  - Tonghe Town, Heilongjiang
- Tonghe, Guangxi, in Pingnan County, Guangxi
- Tonghe Township, Tanghe County, Henan
- Tonghe Subdistrict, Guangzhou, Guangdong
- Tonghe Subdistrict, Pingdu, Shandong
