= CZG =

CZG or CŽg may refer to:

- Colt CZ Group, a Czech holding company in the firearms industry
- Tri-Cities Airport (New York), an airport in Endicott, New York State, US, by FAA code
- CŽg, a manuscript in the Glagolitic script from 16th-century Croatia; see List of Glagolitic manuscripts#1500–1599
- Murmidiidae, a family of beetles, by Catalogue of Life identifier
- Chengzhong District, Liuzhou, a district of Liuzhou, Guangxi Zhuang Autonomous Region, China
- Pro Cycling Team Fanini, a women's cycling team from Albania, by former International Cycling Union code
