= Independent Division of Guangdong Provincial Military District =

1st Independent Division of Guangxi Military District (1967-69) Independent Division of Guangdong Provincial Military District (1969–81)
- Active: 1967.1 - 1981.3
- Country: People's Republic of China
- Branch: People's Liberation Army
- Type: Division
- Role: Infantry
- Garrison/HQ: Shaoguan, Guangdong

1st Independent Division of Guangxi Military District(Chinese: 广西军区独立第1师)(1st Formation) was formed in January 1967 from 2nd Independent Regiment and five independent battalions of Guangxi Military District. The division was composed of three regiments (1st to 3rd).

From its formation to July 1, 1975, the division's code-number was Military Unit 6949. From 1975 to 1981 the division's code-number was Military Unit 54101.

From July 26 to August 6, 1968, a detachment from the division, under the command of its deputy commander, Wang Jianxun(Chinese: 王建勋), conducted a number of mass massacre in Binyang, Guangxi, killing 3681 civilians. The incident is considered one of the most bloody massacres during the Cultural Revolution.

In March 1969, it moved to Shaoguan, Guangdong and was renamed as Independent Division of Guangdong Provincial Military District (Chinese: 广东省军区独立师).

In March 1977, its 3rd Infantry Regiment was detached. The division then absorbed the disbanding 142nd Army Division. By then the division was composed of four regiments (1st to 3rd infantry, artillery).

In March 1981, the division was disbanded.
