= Qianjiang =

Qianjiang may refer to:

- Qianjiang District (黔江区), Chongqing
- Qianjiang, Hubei (潜江市), sub-prefecture-level city
- Qianjiang Century City (钱江世纪城), Xiaoshan District, Hangzhou, Zhejiang
- Qianjiang, Guangxi (迁江镇), town in and subdivision of Xingbin District, Laibin
- Qianjiang (錢江, 922–979), a former county in modern Hangzhou, Zhejiang, administered by Hang Prefecture

== Rivers ==
- Qian River (黔江), a short section of the Xi River system in Guangxi
- Qiantang River, also called Qianjiang (钱江), in Zhejiang, emptying into Hangzhou Bay

== Others ==
- Qianjiang Motorcycle, a motorcycle manufacturer based in Taizhou, Zhejiang, China
- Qianjiang Evening News, a newspaper based in Hangzhou, Zhejiang, China
