= Yingpan =

Yíngpán (营盘) may refer to the following locations in China:

- Yingpan, Beihai, town in Tieshangang District, Beihai, Guangxi
- Yingpan, Zhashui County, town in Zhashui County, Shaanxi
- Yingpan, Fengqing County, town in Fengqing County, Yunnan
- Yingpan, Lanping County, town in Lanping Bai and Pumi Autonomous County, Yunnan
