= Jiayou =

Jiayou may refer to:

- Jiayou (1056–1063), era name used by Emperor Renzong of Song
- Jiayou, Guangxi, in Lingyun County, Guangxi, China
- Jiayou (cheer) (literally "add oil"), expression of encouragement and support in Chinese

== See also ==
- Add oil
