= Bailu Subdistrict, Liuzhou =

Bailu Subdistrict 白露街道
- Subdistrict
- Location in Guangxi
- Coordinates: 24°22′16″N 109°22′38″E
- Country: People's Republic of China
- Autonomous region: Guangxi
- Prefecture-level city: Liuzhou
- District: Liubei District
- Time zone: UTC+8 (China Standard)

Bailu Subdistrict (Chinese: 白露街道; pinyin: Báilù Jiēdào) is a subdistrict in Liubei District, Liuzhou, Guangxi, China. As of 2018, it has 2 residential communities and 4 villages under its administration.

== See also ==
- List of township-level divisions of Guangxi
