= Daqiao, Luchuan County =

Daqiao 大桥镇
- Town
- Location in Guangxi
- Coordinates: 22°14′58″N 110°13′36″E
- Country: People's Republic of China
- Autonomous Region: Guangxi
- Prefecture-level city: Yulin
- County: Luchuan County
- Time zone: UTC+8 (China Standard)

Daqiao (simplified Chinese: 大桥; traditional Chinese: 大橋; pinyin: Dàqiáo) is a town in Luchuan County, Guangxi, China. As of 2018, it has 11 villages under its administration.

== See also ==
- List of township-level divisions of Guangxi
