= Hedong Subdistrict, Liuzhou =

Hedong Subdistrict 河东街道
- Subdistrict
- Location in Guangxi
- Coordinates: 24°20′51″N 109°25′30″E
- Country: People's Republic of China
- Autonomous Region: Guangxi
- Prefecture-level city: Liuzhou
- District: Chengzhong District
- Time zone: UTC+8 (China Standard)

Hedong Subdistrict (simplified Chinese: 河东街道; traditional Chinese: 河東街道; pinyin: Hédōng Jiēdào) is a subdistrict in Chengzhong District, Liuzhou, Guangxi, China. As of 2018, it has 5 residential communities and 2 villages under its administration.

== See also ==
- List of township-level divisions of Guangxi
