= Xiangyang Subdistrict, Qinzhou =

Xiangyang Subdistrict 向阳街道
- Subdistrict
- Location in Guangxi
- Coordinates: 21°57′45″N 108°37′25″E
- Country: People's Republic of China
- Autonomous region: Guangxi
- Prefecture-level city: Qinzhou
- District: Qinnan District
- Time zone: UTC+8 (China Standard)

Xiangyang Subdistrict (Chinese: 向阳街道; pinyin: Xiàngyáng Jiēdào) is a subdistrict in Qinnan District, Qinzhou, Guangxi, China. As of 2018, it has 2 residential communities under its administration.

== See also ==
- List of township-level divisions of Guangxi
