= Xinjiang, Guangxi =

Xinjiang 新江镇
- Town
- Location in Guangxi
- Coordinates: 22°37′26″N 108°29′31″E
- Country: People's Republic of China
- Autonomous region: Guangxi
- Prefecture-level city: Nanning
- District: Yongning District
- Time zone: UTC+8 (China Standard)

Xinjiang (Chinese: 新江; pinyin: Xīnjiāng) is a town under the administration of Yongning District, Nanning, Guangxi, China. As of 2018, it has one residential community and 8 villages under its administration.
