= Liushi Subdistrict, Liuzhou =

Liushi Subdistrict 柳石街道
- Subdistrict
- Location in Guangxi
- Coordinates: 24°18′2″N 109°24′0″E
- Country: People's Republic of China
- Autonomous region: Guangxi
- Prefecture-level city: Liuzhou
- District: Liunan District
- Time zone: UTC+8 (China Standard)

Liushi Subdistrict (Chinese: 柳石街道; pinyin: Liǔshí Jiēdào) is a subdistrict in Liunan District, Liuzhou, Guangxi, China. As of 2018, it has 6 residential communities under its administration.

== Administrative divisions ==
Liushi Sub-district has the following areas under its jurisdiction: Chengzhan Community, Datong Community, Xinfeng Community, Chengxin Community, Hongyang Community, Dongzhan Community, Liuyong Community and Bada Community.

== See also ==
- List of township-level divisions of Guangxi
