= Gangcheng Subdistrict =

Gangcheng Subdistrict 钢城街道
- Urban Subdistrict
- Gāngchéng Jiēdào
- Location in Guangxi Location in China
- Coordinates: 24°23′07″N 109°24′27″E
- Country: People's Republic of China
- Province: Guangxi
- Prefecture-level city: Liuzhou
- District: Liubei

Area
  - Total: 8.541 km^{2} (3.298 sq mi)

Population (2010)
  - Total: 39,813
- Time zone: UTC+8 (China Standard)

Gangcheng Subdistrict (Chinese: 钢城街道; pinyin: Gāngchéng Jiēdào) is an urban subdistrict located in Liubei District, Liuzhou, Guangxi, China. According to the 2010 census, Gangcheng Subdistrict had a population of 39,813, including 21,060 males and 18,753 females. The population was distributed as follows: 5,134 people aged under 14, 30,348 people aged between 15 and 64, and 4,331 people aged over 65.

== See also ==
- List of township-level divisions of Guangxi
