= Jingxi, Guangxi =

Jingxi 靖西市 · Cingsih Si
- County-level city
- Interactive map of Jingxi
- Coordinates: 23°08′N 106°25′E
- Country: China
- Province: Guangxi
- Prefecture-level city: Baise
- Municipal seat: Xinjing

Area
  - Total: 3,331 km^{2} (1,286 sq mi)
- Elevation: 748 m (2,454 ft)

Population (2020)
  - Total: 489,163
  - Density: 146.9/km^{2} (380.3/sq mi)
- Time zone: UTC+8 (China Standard)
- Website: http://www.gx.xinhuanet.com/bswz/jxx/

Jingxi (Chinese: 靖西市; pinyin: Jìngxī Shì, Zhuang: Cingsae Si) is a county-level city of western Guangxi, China. It is under the administration of Baise City.

== Administrative divisions ==
There are 11 towns and 8 townships in Jingxi:

Towns:

- Xinjing (新靖镇), Huadong (化峒镇), Hurun (湖润镇), Ande (安德镇), Youlin (龙临镇), Quyang (渠洋镇), Yuexu (岳圩镇), Longbang (龙邦镇), Ludong (禄峒镇), Wuping (武平镇), Dizhou (地州镇)

Townships:

- Tongde Township (同德乡), Renzhuang Township (壬庄乡), Anning Township (安宁乡), Nanpo Township (南坡乡), Tianpan Township (吞盘乡), Guole Township (果乐乡), Xinjia Township (新甲乡), Kuixu Township (魁圩乡)

== Demographics ==
Jingxi's population was 489,163 (2020). 97.3% of the people belong to the Zhuang ethnic group. The rest include Han, Yao, Miao, and other ethnic groups.

Ethnic groups in Jingxi (2020)
	Percentage
Zhuang	97.30%
Han	2.39%
Others	0.31%

== Languages ==
David Holm (2010) lists the following Zhuang dialects of Jingxi County, and provides comparative word lists for them as well. Holm (2010) notes that Zhuang dialects have not diversified gradually within Jingxi County, but are the results of mass migrations from other parts of Guangxi and even from Vietnam during the past several centuries.

- Yang 洋/佯 (phu˩˧ jaŋ˥˦): Lingua franca of Jingxi County, spoken in county seat and most towns.
- Nong 儂 (Nung, phu˩˧ tsuŋ˨˩˦): spoken in villages around the county seat. It has more conservative phonology than Yang, although Nong is closely related to Yang.
- Zong 宗 (Tsung, phu˩˧ tsuŋ˨˩˦): in Longlin 龍臨, Sanhe 三合, Guole 果樂, and Nanpo 南坡 townships.
- Long’an 儂安 (Nung’an, noŋ˧˩ aːn˥˦): in Longlin 龍臨, Sanhe 三合, Dajia 大甲, and Dadao 大道 townships. Northern Tai.
- Sheng 省 (Seng, phu˩˧ θeŋ˨˧˨˧): in Wuping 武平, Sanhe, Ande 安德, and Nanpo 南坡 (Dingjin 定金) townships. Northern Tai.
- Rui 銳 (Yui, phu˩˧ jui˨˧˨˧): in Quyang 渠洋, Longlin 龍臨, and Kuixu 魁墟 townships.
- Zuozhou 左州 (Tsatsou, phu13 tsa54 tsou54): in Longlin 龍臨, Ande 安德, Sanhe 三合, and Wuping 武平 townships.
- Fu: in Quyang 渠洋 township.

== Climate ==
Climate data for Jingxi, elevation 725 m (2,379 ft), (1991–2020 normals, extremes 1981–present)
Month	Jan	Feb	Mar	Apr	May	Jun	Jul	Aug	Sep	Oct	Nov	Dec	Year
Record high °C (°F)	26.7 (80.1)	31.9 (89.4)	33.8 (92.8)	35.5 (95.9)	36.9 (98.4)	34.3 (93.7)	35.4 (95.7)	35.2 (95.4)	34.8 (94.6)	32.0 (89.6)	30.0 (86.0)	27.7 (81.9)	36.9 (98.4)
Mean daily maximum °C (°F)	15.2 (59.4)	17.6 (63.7)	20.9 (69.6)	25.4 (77.7)	28.1 (82.6)	29.4 (84.9)	29.7 (85.5)	29.8 (85.6)	28.4 (83.1)	25.3 (77.5)	21.8 (71.2)	17.4 (63.3)	24.1 (75.3)
Daily mean °C (°F)	11.6 (52.9)	13.7 (56.7)	16.9 (62.4)	21.0 (69.8)	23.7 (74.7)	25.2 (77.4)	25.4 (77.7)	25.1 (77.2)	23.6 (74.5)	20.7 (69.3)	17.1 (62.8)	13.0 (55.4)	19.7 (67.6)
Mean daily minimum °C (°F)	9.2 (48.6)	11.1 (52.0)	14.3 (57.7)	18.0 (64.4)	20.7 (69.3)	22.5 (72.5)	22.7 (72.9)	22.2 (72.0)	20.5 (68.9)	17.8 (64.0)	14.0 (57.2)	10.0 (50.0)	16.9 (62.5)
Record low °C (°F)	−1.0 (30.2)	1.0 (33.8)	1.4 (34.5)	7.6 (45.7)	10.4 (50.7)	13.7 (56.7)	17.1 (62.8)	17.4 (63.3)	12.9 (55.2)	7.6 (45.7)	3.2 (37.8)	−1.4 (29.5)	−1.4 (29.5)
Average precipitation mm (inches)	45.2 (1.78)	26.9 (1.06)	54.5 (2.15)	66.7 (2.63)	196.2 (7.72)	331.8 (13.06)	317.1 (12.48)	294.3 (11.59)	152.8 (6.02)	92.6 (3.65)	45.7 (1.80)	31.4 (1.24)	1,655.2 (65.18)
Average precipitation days (≥ 0.1 mm)	13.0	12.0	13.6	13.4	16.5	19.8	21.6	19.3	13.0	10.1	8.8	8.3	169.4
Average snowy days	0.2	0	0	0	0	0	0	0	0	0	0	0	0.2
Average relative humidity (%)	79	78	79	77	76	80	81	81	79	76	76	75	78
Mean monthly sunshine hours	63.6	71.4	83.7	118.3	146.0	126.6	148.3	165.5	152.2	125.0	122.2	104.9	1,427.7
Percentage possible sunshine	19	22	22	31	36	31	36	42	42	35	37	32	32
Source: China Meteorological Administration all-time October record

== Transportation ==
The city has one railway station, Jingxi railway station.
