= Pumiao =

Pumiao 蒲庙镇
- Town
- Interactive map of Pumiao
- Coordinates: 22°44′56″N 108°29′41″E
- Country: People's Republic of China
- Region: Guangxi
- Prefecture-level city: Nanning
- District: Yongning
- Elevation: 102 m (335 ft)
- Time zone: UTC+8 (China Standard Time)
- Area code: 0771

Pumiao (simplified Chinese: 蒲庙; traditional Chinese: 蒲廟; pinyin: Púmiào) is a town in Yongning District, in the eastern suburbs of Nanning, Guangxi Zhuang Autonomous Region, People's Republic of China, on the southern (right) bank of the Yong River.
