= Yanghe Subdistrict =

Yanghe Subdistrict 阳和街道
- Subdistrict
- Location in Guangxi
- Coordinates: 24°18′57″N 109°29′2″E
- Country: People's Republic of China
- Autonomous region: Guangxi
- Prefecture-level city: Liuzhou
- District: Yufeng District
- Time zone: UTC+8 (China Standard)

Yanghe Subdistrict (simplified Chinese: 阳和街道; traditional Chinese: 陽和街道; pinyin: Yánghé Jiēdào) is a subdistrict in Yufeng District, Liuzhou, Guangxi, China. As of 2020, it administers the following four residential neighborhoods and two villages:

Neighborhoods

- Xincheng Community (新城社区)
- Chunyuan Community (春苑社区)
- Cuihu Community (翠湖社区)
- Dongjin Community (东晋社区)

Villages

- Yanghe Village
- Shewan Village (社湾村)

== See also ==
- List of township-level divisions of Guangxi
