= Liubei District =

Liubei 柳北区 · Liujbwj Gih
- District
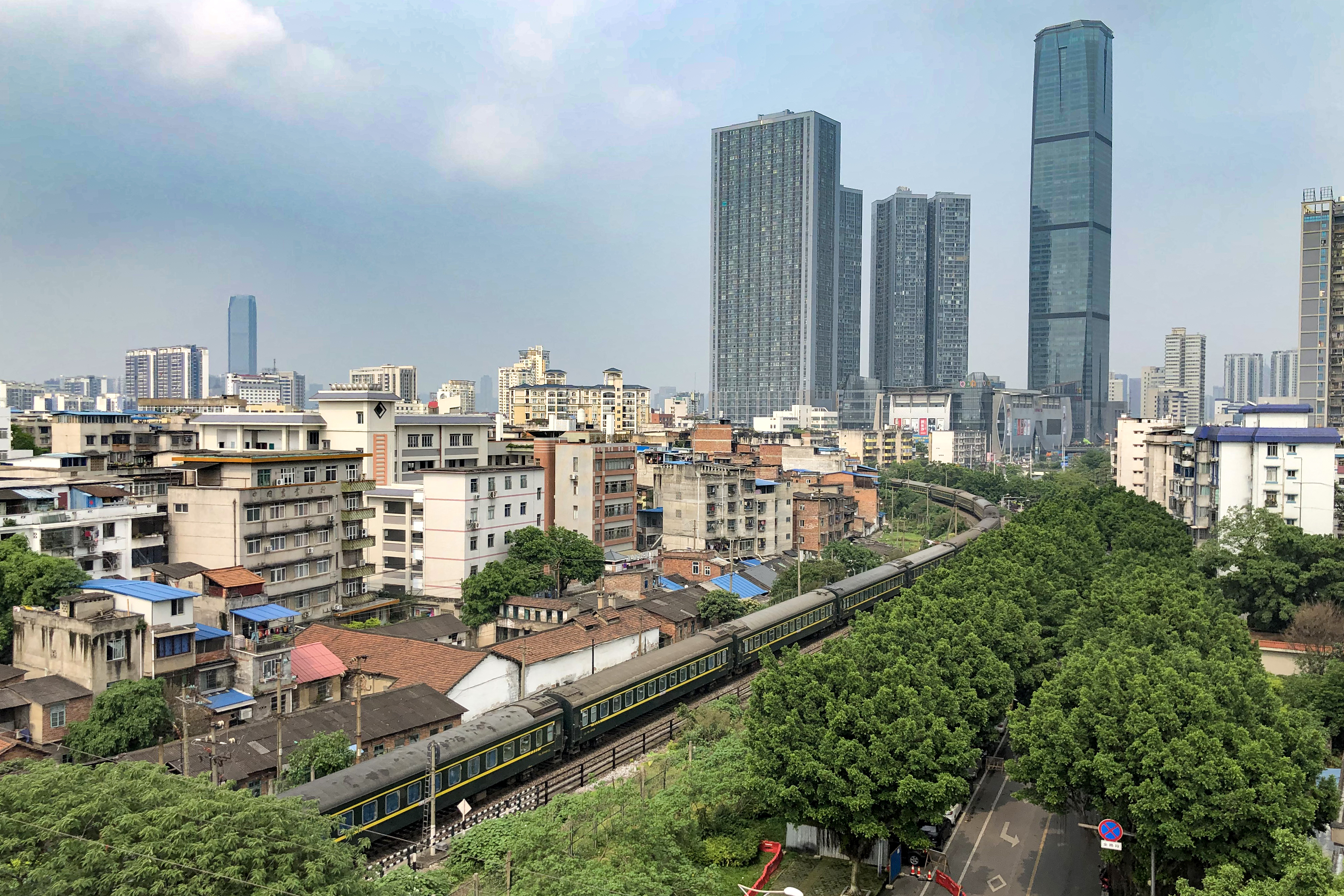
- Skyline of Liubei District in April 2019

- Location in Guangxi
- Coordinates: 24°22′09″N 109°23′55″E
- Country: China
- Autonomous region: Guangxi
- Prefecture-level city: Liuzhou
- District seat: Que'ershan

Area
  - Total: 301.27 km^{2} (116.32 sq mi)

Population (2010)
  - Total: 428,043
  - Density: 1,420.8/km^{2} (3,679.8/sq mi)
- Time zone: UTC+8 (China Standard)

Liubei District (simplified Chinese: 柳北区; traditional Chinese: 柳北區; pinyin: Liǔběi Qū; Standard Zhuang: Liujbwj Gih) is the county seat and one of four districts of Liuzhou, Guangxi Zhuang Autonomous Region, China.

== Administrative divisions ==
Liubei District is divided into 9 subdistricts and 3 towns:

subdistricts

- Jiefang 解放街道
- Yaru 雅儒街道
- Shengli 胜利街道
- Que'ershan 雀儿山街道
- Gangcheng 钢城街道
- Jinxiu 锦绣街道
- Bailu 白露街道
- Yuejin 跃进街道
- Liuchang 柳长街道

towns

- Shibeiping 石碑坪镇
- Shatang 沙塘镇
- Changtang 长塘镇

== Climate ==
Climate data for Shatang Town, Liubei District, elevation 98 m (322 ft), (1991–2020 normals, extremes 1955–2010)
Month	Jan	Feb	Mar	Apr	May	Jun	Jul	Aug	Sep	Oct	Nov	Dec	Year
Record high °C (°F)	27.6 (81.7)	33.1 (91.6)	34.2 (93.6)	35.1 (95.2)	36.1 (97.0)	36.9 (98.4)	40.7 (105.3)	39.3 (102.7)	39.6 (103.3)	35.9 (96.6)	33 (91)	29.8 (85.6)	40.7 (105.3)
Mean daily maximum °C (°F)	14.0 (57.2)	16.4 (61.5)	19.4 (66.9)	25.2 (77.4)	29.4 (84.9)	31.4 (88.5)	33.1 (91.6)	33.4 (92.1)	31.8 (89.2)	27.8 (82.0)	22.8 (73.0)	17.2 (63.0)	25.2 (77.3)
Daily mean °C (°F)	9.9 (49.8)	12.3 (54.1)	15.5 (59.9)	20.9 (69.6)	24.8 (76.6)	27.1 (80.8)	28.4 (83.1)	28.2 (82.8)	26.2 (79.2)	22 (72)	16.9 (62.4)	11.6 (52.9)	20.3 (68.6)
Mean daily minimum °C (°F)	7.1 (44.8)	9.4 (48.9)	12.8 (55.0)	17.7 (63.9)	21.4 (70.5)	24.1 (75.4)	25.0 (77.0)	24.7 (76.5)	22.4 (72.3)	18.0 (64.4)	12.9 (55.2)	8.0 (46.4)	17.0 (62.5)
Record low °C (°F)	−5.8 (21.6)	−1.6 (29.1)	−0.1 (31.8)	7.2 (45.0)	10.9 (51.6)	15.7 (60.3)	18.8 (65.8)	20.3 (68.5)	13 (55)	6.5 (43.7)	1.4 (34.5)	−3.9 (25.0)	−5.8 (21.6)
Average precipitation mm (inches)	61.7 (2.43)	47.0 (1.85)	106.1 (4.18)	133.6 (5.26)	230.6 (9.08)	318.3 (12.53)	207.8 (8.18)	159.4 (6.28)	76.5 (3.01)	51.0 (2.01)	52.4 (2.06)	46.5 (1.83)	1,490.9 (58.7)
Average precipitation days	12.3	12.2	17.6	16.0	15.6	17.8	15.7	13.4	8.4	6.9	8.0	8.9	152.8
Average snowy days	0.4	0.1	0	0	0	0	0	0	0	0	0	0.2	0.7
Average relative humidity (%)	78	78	82	81	81	83	80	80	78	76	77	75	79
Mean monthly sunshine hours	59.8	52.5	50.5	80.1	122.6	119.4	178.0	188.4	177.7	164.8	129.7	109.8	1,433.3
Percentage possible sunshine	18	16	14	21	30	29	43	47	49	46	40	33	32
Source: China Meteorological Administrationall-time record low
