= Piaoli =

Piaoli 瓢里镇
- Town
- Location in Guangxi
- Coordinates: 25°50′59″N 109°50′19″E
- Country: China
- Autonomous region: Guangxi
- Prefecture: Guilin
- Autonomous county: Longsheng Various Nationalities Autonomous County

Area
  - Total: 207.82 km^{2} (80.24 sq mi)

Population (2018)
  - Total: 14,944
  - Density: 71.908/km^{2} (186.24/sq mi)
- Time zone: UTC+08:00 (China Standard)
- Postal code: 541702
- Area code: 0773

Piaoli (simplified Chinese: 瓢里镇; traditional Chinese: 瓢裡鎮; pinyin: Piáolǐ Zhèn) is a town in Longsheng Various Nationalities Autonomous County, Guangxi, China. As of the 2018 census, it had a population of 14,944 and an area of 207.82-square-kilometre (80.24 sq mi).

== Administrative divisions ==
As of 2020, the town is divided into 1 residential community and 10 villages.

=== Residential communities ===
The town's sole residential community is Piaolijie Community (Chinese: 瓢里街社区).

=== Villages ===
The town's 10 villages are as follows:

- Dayun (Chinese: 大云村)
- Shangtang (Chinese: 上塘村)
- Piaoli (Chinese: 瓢里村)
- Jiaozhou (Chinese: 交洲村)
- Liuman (Chinese: 六漫村)
- Jiequan (Chinese: 界泉村)
- Silong (Chinese: 思陇村)
- Meidong (Chinese: 梅洞村)
- Pingling (Chinese: 坪岭村)
- Menghua (Chinese: 孟化村)

== History ==
In early Qing dynasty (1644–1911), it belonged to Piaolixun (瓢里汛) and Piaolitang (瓢里塘). In late Qing dynasty, it came under the jurisdiction of Xituan (西团).

In the Republic of China, it was under the jurisdiction of the West District (正威乡), and then Zhengwei Township (西区正威乡), and finally Zhenxi Township (镇西乡).

In 1994, it was upgraded to a town.

== Geography ==
The town is located in northwestern Longsheng Various Nationalities Autonomous County. It borders Tongdao Dong Autonomous County in the northwest, Longsheng Town in the east, Sanmen Town in the south, and Sanjiang Dong Autonomous County and Tongdao Dong Autonomous County in the west.

The Xun River runs through the town west to southeast.

== Demographics ==
The villages of Dayun (Chinese: 大云村), Jiaozhou (Chinese: 交洲村), Liuman (Chinese: 六漫村), Silong (Chinese: 思陇村), Meidong (Chinese: 梅洞村), and Menghua (Chinese: 孟化村) are home to concentrations of Zhuang people.

== Economy ==
The economy of the town is supported primarily by farming, ranching and mineral resources. The region are rich in manganese and quartz.

== Tourist attractions ==
Yulongtan Scenic Spot (玉龙滩旅游风景区) is a famous scenic spot in the town.

== Transportation ==
The G65 Baotou–Maoming Expressway, more commonly known as "Bao-Mao Expressway", passes west to southeast of the town.

The China National Highway 321, commonly referred to as "G321", is a west-southeast highway passing through the town.
