= Dalun, Guangxi =

Dalun 大伦镇
- Town
- Location in Guangxi
- Coordinates: 22°18′02″N 110°42′39″E
- Country: People's Republic of China
- Autonomous Region: Guangxi
- Prefecture-level city: Yulin
- County-level city: Beiliu
- Village-level divisions: 1 residential community 9 villages 1 farm community
- Elevation: 75 m (246 ft)
- Time zone: UTC+8 (China Standard)

Dalun (simplified Chinese: 大伦; traditional Chinese: 大倫; pinyin: Dàlún) is a town of the county-level city of Beiliu, Yulin in southeast Guangxi, China, bordering Guangdong province to the east. As of 2018, it has one residential community (社区), 9 villages and one farm community under its administration.

== See also ==
- List of township-level divisions of Guangxi
