= Daxu, Lingchuan County =

Daxu 大圩镇
- Town
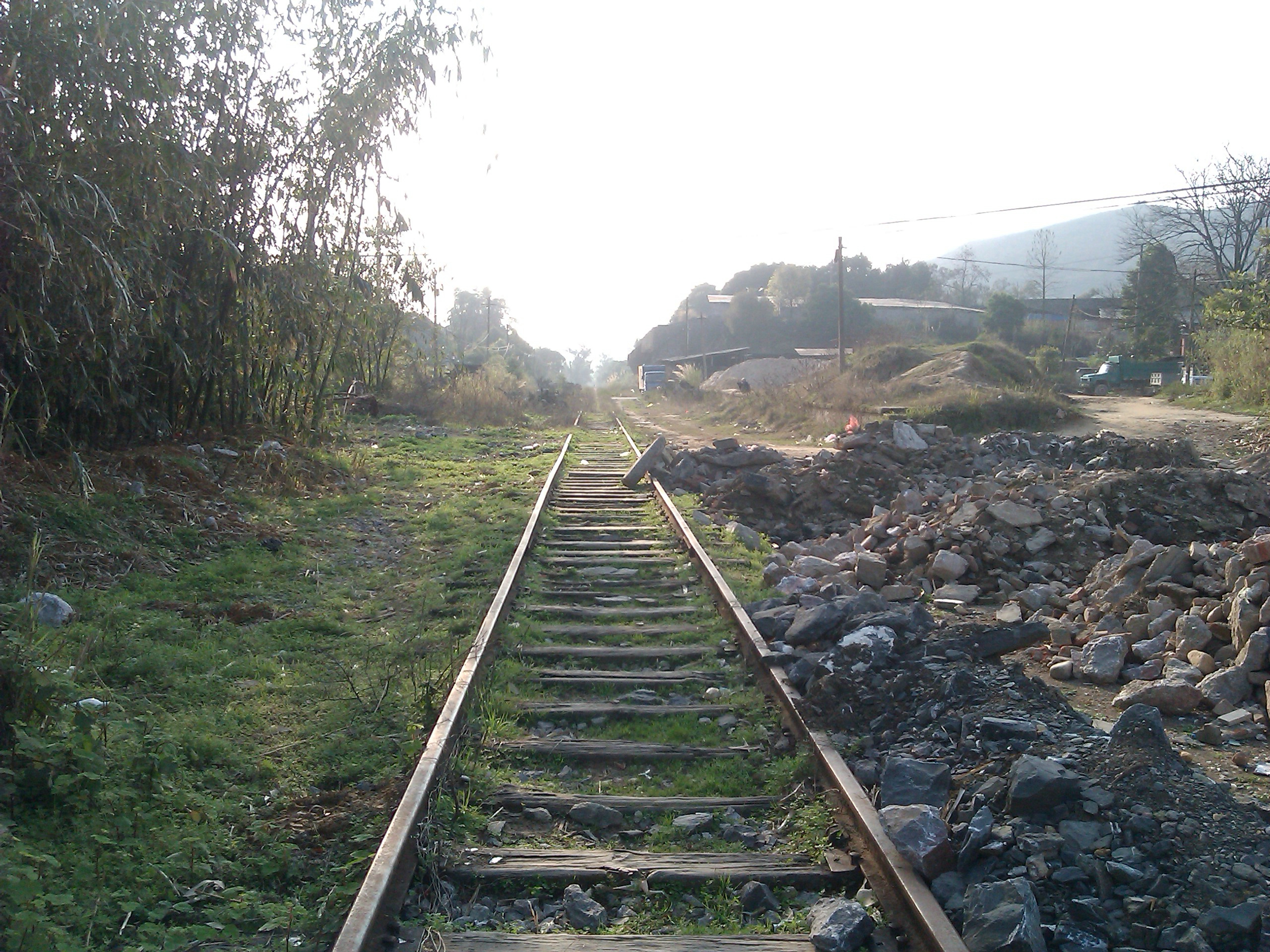
- Unused railroad in Daxu

- Location in Guangxi
- Coordinates: 25°11′16″N 110°25′7″E
- Country: People's Republic of China
- Autonomous region: Guangxi
- Prefecture-level city: Guilin
- County: Lingchuan County
- Time zone: UTC+8 (China Standard)

Daxu (Chinese: 大圩; pinyin: Dàxū) is a town in Lingchuan County, Guilin, Guangxi Province, China. As of 2020, it administers one residential community and the following 17 villages:

- Daxu Village
- Ganxing Village (敢兴村)
- Han Village (嵅村)
- Liaojia Village (廖家村)
- Zhujia Village (朱家村)
- Lijia Village (李家村)
- Gaoqiao Village (高桥村)
- Shangqiao Village (上桥村)
- Xiong Village (雄村)
- Xiazhang Village (下张村)
- Nanji Village (南积村)
- Xima Village (西马村)
- Jiansha Village (涧沙村)
- Yuanjia Village (袁家村)
- Qin'an Village (秦岸村)
- Fuli Village (茯荔村)
- Maozhou Village (毛洲村)
