= Luosha Township =

Luosha Township 逻沙乡
- Township
- Location in Guangxi
- Coordinates: 24°40′59″N 106°25′40″E
- Country: People's Republic of China
- Autonomous region: Guangxi
- Prefecture-level city: Baise
- County: Leye County
- Time zone: UTC+8 (China Standard)

Luosha Township (simplified Chinese: 逻沙乡; traditional Chinese: 邏沙鄉; pinyin: Luóshā Xiāng) is a township in Leye County, Guangxi, China. As of 2020, it administers the following eleven villages:

- Renlong Village (仁龙村)
- Shanzhou Village (山洲村)
- Hanji Village (汉吉村)
- Taiping Village (太坪村)
- Dangxiong Village (党雄村)
- Jiulong Village (九龙村)
- Tangying Village (塘英村)
- Quanda Village (全达村)
- Luowa Village (逻瓦村)
- Longnan Village (龙南村)
- Huanglong Village (黄龙村)
