= Guanyinge Township =

Guanyinge Township 观音阁乡
- Township
- Interactive map of Guanyinge Township
- Coordinates: 25°15′36″N 110°54′23″E
- Country: People's Republic of China
- Region: Guangxi
- Prefecture-level city: Guilin
- County: Guanyang
- Village-level divisions: 6 villages
- Elevation: 337 m (1,106 ft)
- Time zone: UTC+8 (China Standard)
- Area code: 0311

Guanyinge Township (simplified Chinese: 观音阁乡; traditional Chinese: 觀音閣鄉; pinyin: Guānyīngé Xiāng) is a township of Guanyang County in northeastern Guangxi, China, located about 35 kilometres (22 mi) southeast of the county seat. As of 2011, it has 16 villages under its administration.

== See also ==
- List of township-level divisions of Guangxi
