= Xiangli, Guangxi =

Xiangli 湘漓镇
- Town
- Location in Guangxi
- Coordinates: 25°36′59″N 110°40′42″E
- Country: People's Republic of China
- Autonomous Region: Guangxi
- Prefecture-level city: Guilin
- County: Xing'an County
- Time zone: UTC+8 (China Standard)

Xiangli (Chinese: 湘漓) is a town of Xing'an County, Guangxi, China. As of 2018, it has 14 villages under its administration.
