= Xinjing, Guangxi =

Xinjing 新靖镇
- Town
- Location in Guangxi
- Coordinates: 23°8′18″N 106°24′41″E
- Country: People's Republic of China
- Autonomous Region: Guangxi
- Prefecture-level city: Baise
- County-level city: Jingxi
- Time zone: UTC+8 (China Standard)

Xinjing (Chinese: 新靖) is a town of Jingxi, Guangxi, China. As of 2018, it has 9 residential communities and 21 villages under its administration.
