= Wuping, Guangxi =

Wuping 武平镇
- Town
- Location in Guangxi
- Coordinates: 23°10′36″N 106°30′19″E
- Country: People's Republic of China
- Autonomous Region: Guangxi
- Prefecture-level city: Baise
- County-level city: Jingxi
- Time zone: UTC+8 (China Standard)

Wuping (Chinese: 武平) is a town of Jingxi, Guangxi, China. As of 2018, it has 22 villages under its administration.
