= Guanyinge, Xupu =

Guanyinge 观音阁镇
- Town
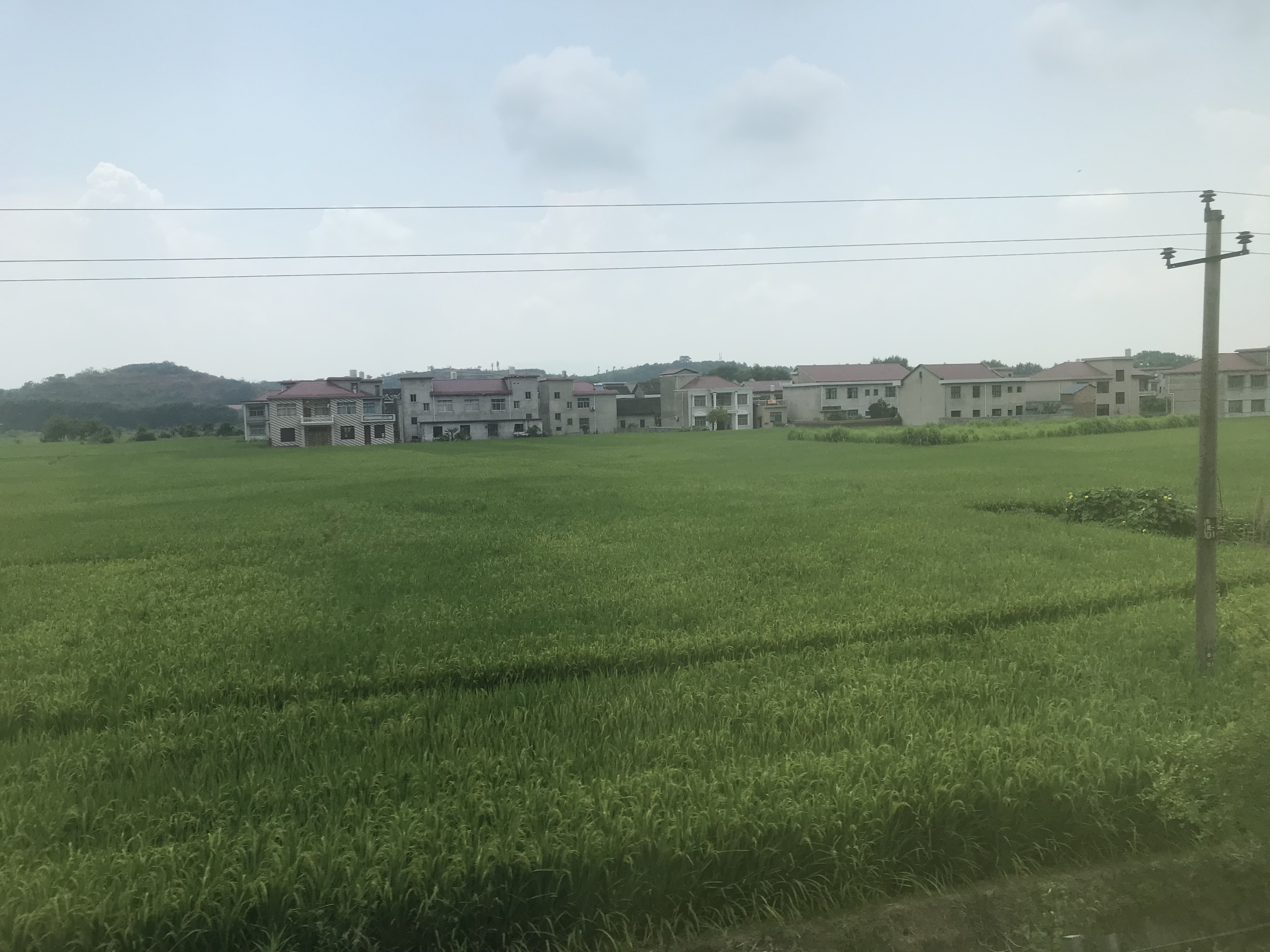
- Interactive map of Guanyinge
- Coordinates: 28°00′01″N 110°37′37″E
- Country: People's Republic of China
- Province: Hunan
- Prefecture-level city: Huaihua
- County: Xupu
- Village-level divisions: 2 residential communities 22 villages
- Elevation: 192 m (630 ft)
- Time zone: UTC+8 (China Standard)
- Area code: 0745

Guanyinge (simplified Chinese: 观音阁; traditional Chinese: 觀音閣; pinyin: Guānyīngé; lit. 'Guanyin Temple') is a town in Xupu County in western Hunan province, China, located about 10 kilometres (6.2 mi) northeast of the county seat. As of 2011, it has two residential communities (居委会) and 22 villages under its administration.
