= Yantang, Guangxi =

Yantang 燕塘镇
- Town
- Interactive map of Yantang
- Coordinates: 24°29′56″N 111°06′22″E
- Country: People's Republic of China
- Region: Guangxi
- Prefecture-level city: Hezhou
- County: Zhongshan
- Time zone: UTC+8 (China Standard)

Yantang (Chinese: 燕塘; pinyin: Yàntáng) is a town in the northeast of Guangxi, China, located not far from the border with Hunan province. It is under the administration of Zhongshan County.
