= Binyang County =

Binyang County 宾阳县 · Binhyangz Yen Pinyang
- County
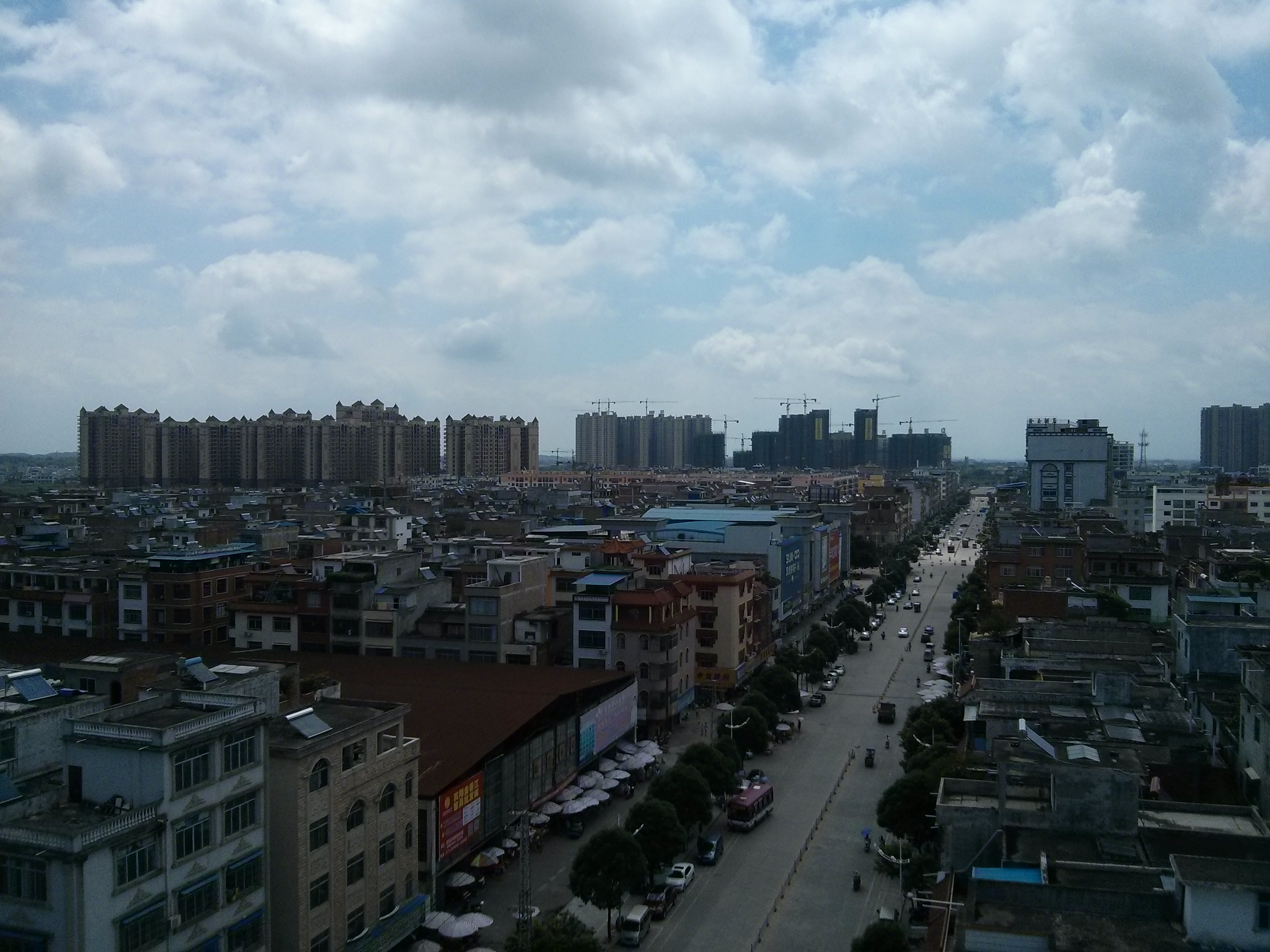
- Binyang County in June 2015

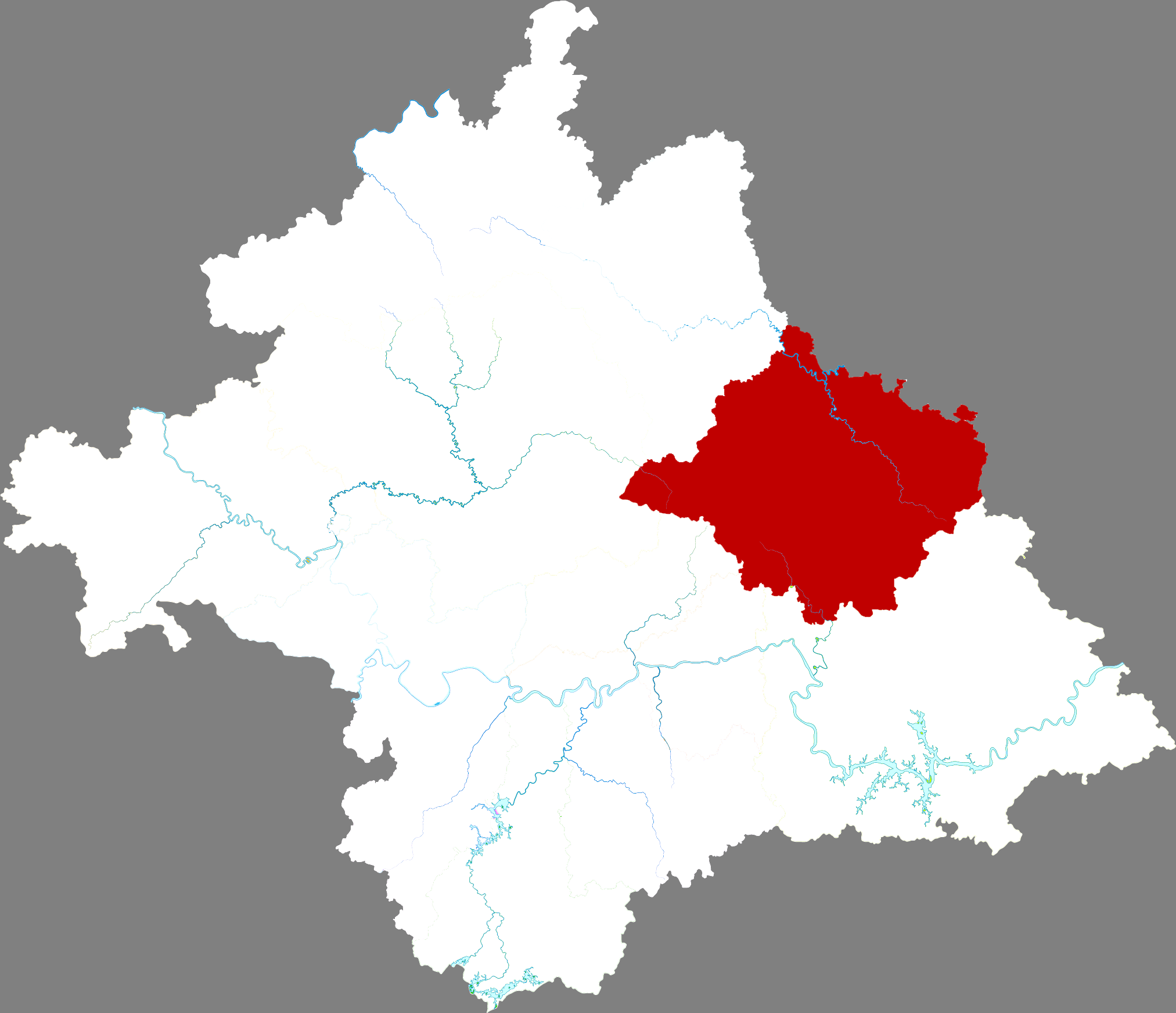
- Location in Nanning

- Location of the seat in Guangxi
- Coordinates: 23°12′54″N 108°51′14″E
- Country: China
- Autonomous region: Guangxi
- Prefecture-level city: Nanning
- County seat: Binzhou (宾州镇)

Area
  - Total: 2,314 km^{2} (893 sq mi)

Population (2010)
  - Total: 782,255
  - Density: 338.1/km^{2} (875.6/sq mi)
- Time zone: UTC+8 (China Standard)
- Postal code: 5304XX

Binyang County (simplified Chinese: 宾阳县; traditional Chinese: 賓陽縣; pinyin: Bīnyáng Xiàn; Standard Zhuang: Binhyangz Yen) is a county of Guangxi Zhuang Autonomous Region, China. It is under the administration of the prefecture-level city of Nanning, the capital of Guangxi, with a permanent population of 782,255 and a hukou population of 1,051,373 as of the 2010 Census. It borders the prefecture-level cities of Laibin to the northeast and Guigang to the east. The main highways passing near the county seat are China National Highways 322 and 324. The local economy is based mostly on industry and services. The county seat is Binzhou Town, known as one of the oldest towns in Guangxi which has population over 200,000 people. People speak Binyanghua in Binyang, which is a branch of Cantonese.

== Administrative divisions ==
There are 16 towns in the county:

Binzhou (宾州镇), Litang (黎塘镇), Xinqiao (新桥镇), Xinxu (新圩镇), Daqiao (大桥镇), Zouxu (邹圩镇), Gantang (甘棠镇), Gula (古辣镇), Luxu (露圩镇), Yangqiao (洋桥镇), Wangling (王灵镇), Wuling (武陵镇), Zhonghua (中华镇), Silong (思陇镇), Heji (和吉镇), Chenping (陈平镇)

== Climate ==
Climate data for Binyang, elevation 128 m (420 ft), (1991–2020 normals, extremes 1981–2010)
Month	Jan	Feb	Mar	Apr	May	Jun	Jul	Aug	Sep	Oct	Nov	Dec	Year
Record high °C (°F)	28.1 (82.6)	34.5 (94.1)	35.1 (95.2)	37.6 (99.7)	37.3 (99.1)	37.2 (99.0)	38.3 (100.9)	38.4 (101.1)	37.2 (99.0)	35.7 (96.3)	32.5 (90.5)	29.8 (85.6)	38.4 (101.1)
Mean daily maximum °C (°F)	15.6 (60.1)	17.8 (64.0)	20.5 (68.9)	26.2 (79.2)	30.0 (86.0)	31.7 (89.1)	32.7 (90.9)	32.8 (91.0)	31.2 (88.2)	27.9 (82.2)	23.5 (74.3)	18.3 (64.9)	25.7 (78.2)
Daily mean °C (°F)	12.0 (53.6)	14.1 (57.4)	17.1 (62.8)	22.4 (72.3)	25.8 (78.4)	27.7 (81.9)	28.5 (83.3)	28.4 (83.1)	26.7 (80.1)	23.3 (73.9)	18.8 (65.8)	13.9 (57.0)	21.6 (70.8)
Mean daily minimum °C (°F)	9.5 (49.1)	11.6 (52.9)	14.6 (58.3)	19.5 (67.1)	22.8 (73.0)	25.0 (77.0)	25.5 (77.9)	25.4 (77.7)	23.6 (74.5)	20.0 (68.0)	15.5 (59.9)	10.9 (51.6)	18.7 (65.6)
Record low °C (°F)	1.1 (34.0)	1.5 (34.7)	3.0 (37.4)	8.0 (46.4)	13.4 (56.1)	16.5 (61.7)	20.7 (69.3)	15.4 (59.7)	15.1 (59.2)	10.7 (51.3)	5.0 (41.0)	1.1 (34.0)	1.1 (34.0)
Average precipitation mm (inches)	66.2 (2.61)	49.5 (1.95)	93.0 (3.66)	96.8 (3.81)	220.2 (8.67)	247.2 (9.73)	252.0 (9.92)	201.4 (7.93)	123.7 (4.87)	93.1 (3.67)	67.1 (2.64)	46 (1.8)	1,556.2 (61.26)
Average precipitation days (≥ 0.1 mm)	12.5	12.0	17.1	13.6	15.8	18.7	17.4	15.6	10.1	7.2	7.7	8.9	156.6
Average snowy days	0.1	0	0	0	0	0	0	0	0	0	0	0	0.1
Average relative humidity (%)	77	79	82	79	79	82	80	79	77	73	73	72	78
Mean monthly sunshine hours	62.3	53.0	47.9	87.1	129.8	132.6	169.5	182.0	175.0	164.8	125.5	110.6	1,440.1
Percentage possible sunshine	19	17	13	23	32	33	41	46	48	46	38	33	32
Source: China Meteorological Administration
