= Jiayou, Guangxi =

Jiayou 加尤镇
- Town
- Location in Guangxi
- Coordinates: 24°30′20″N 106°39′41″E
- Country: People's Republic of China
- Autonomous Region: Guangxi
- Prefecture-level city: Baise
- County: Lingyun County
- Time zone: UTC+8 (China Standard)

Jiayou (Chinese: 加尤; pinyin: Jiāyóu) is a town of Lingyun County, Guangxi, China. As of 2020, it administers the following 12 villages:

- Jiayou Village
- Anxiang Village (案相村)
- Yangli Village (央里村)
- Weiba Village (伟八村)
- Zafu Village (杂福村)
- Longhuai Village (陇槐村)
- Moxian Village (磨贤村)
- Shangsan Village (上伞村)
- Dongha Village (东哈村)
- Xiasan Village (下伞村)
- Bailong Village (百陇村)
- Shangyan Village (上岩村)
