= Qianjiang, Guangxi =

Qianjiang
- Town
- 迁江镇
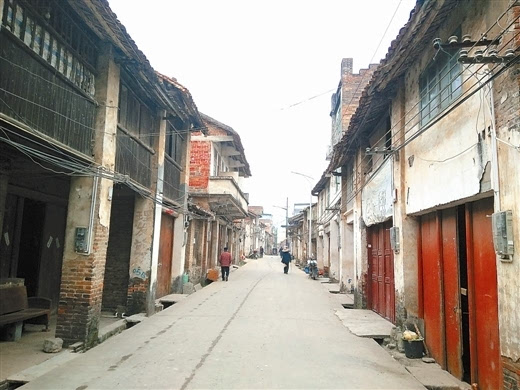

- Location within Guangxi Location within China
- Coordinates: 23.6157°N 108.9603°E
- Country: People's Republic of China
- Province: Guangxi
- City: Laibin
- District: Xingbin District

Area
  - Total: 340.6 km^{2} (131.5 sq mi)

Population (2000)
  - Total: 45,602
- Time zone: UTC+8 (China Standard Time)

Qianjiang is a town in Xingbin District, Laibin, Guangxi, China.

Before 1952 when the decision was made to subsume the Qianjiang county into the Xingbin district, it was the seat of government of Qianjiang county since the early 11th century.

The industries that in Qianjiang is mainly the sugar mill.
