= Yingpan, Guangxi =

Yingpan 营盘镇
- Town
- Interactive map of Yingpan
- Coordinates: 21°27′24″N 109°26′47″E
- Country: People's Republic of China
- Region: Guangxi
- Prefecture-level city: Beihai
- District: Tieshangang
- Time zone: UTC+8 (China Standard)

Yingpan (simplified Chinese: 营盘; traditional Chinese: 營盤; pinyin: Yíngpán) is a town on the coast of the South China Sea in Tieshangang District, Beihai, Guangxi, People's Republic of China.
