= Chengzhong District, Liuzhou =

Chengzhong 城中区 · Cwngzcungh Gih
- District
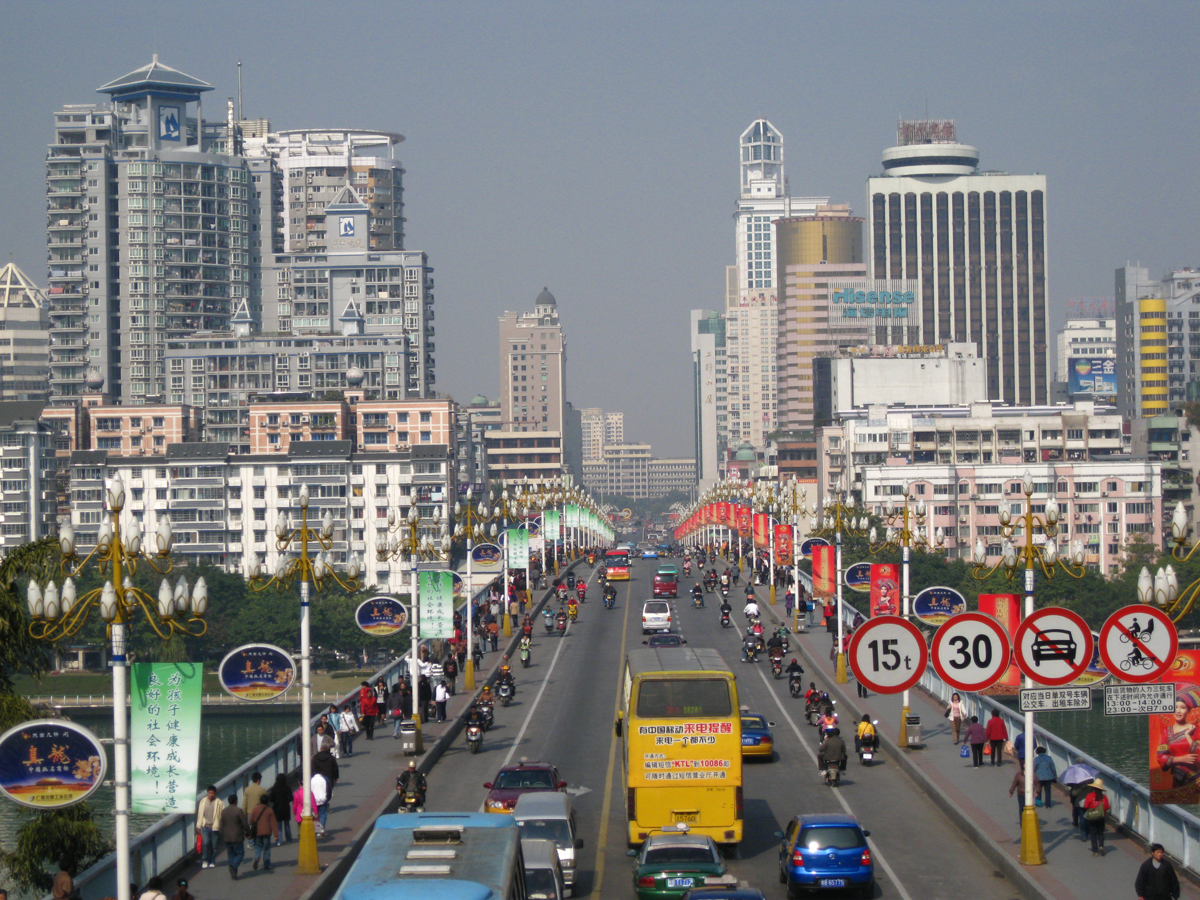

- Location in Guangxi
- Coordinates: 24°18′40″N 109°24′43″E
- Country: China
- Autonomous region: Guangxi
- Prefecture-level city: Liuzhou
- Subdivisions: 7 subdistricts
- Seat: Chengzhong Subdistrict

Area
  - Total: 77.56 km^{2} (29.95 sq mi)

Population (2020 census)
  - Total: 243,628
  - Density: 3,141/km^{2} (8,136/sq mi)
- Time zone: UTC+8 (China Standard)
- Website: www.czq.gov.cn

Chengzhong District (simplified Chinese: 城中区; traditional Chinese: 城中區; pinyin: Chéngzhōng Qū; Standard Zhuang: Cwngzcungh Gih) is the seat of and one of four districts of Liuzhou, Guangxi Zhuang Autonomous Region, China.

== Administrative divisions ==
Chengzhong District is divided into 7 subdistricts:

Subdistricts:

- Chengzhong Subdistrict (城中街道), Gongyuan Subdistrict (公园街道), Zhongnan Subdistrict (中南街道), Shuishang Subdistrict (水上街道), Tanzhong Subdistrict (潭中街道), Hedong Subdistrict (河东街道), Jinglan Subdistrict (静兰街道)
