= Tonghe, Guangxi =

Tonghe 同和镇
- Town
- Location in Guangxi
- Coordinates: 23°47′59″N 110°27′17″E
- Country: People's Republic of China
- Autonomous Region: Guangxi
- Prefecture-level city: Guigang
- County: Pingnan County
- Time zone: UTC+8 (China Standard)

Tonghe (Chinese: 同和; pinyin: Tónghé) is a town of Pingnan County, Guangxi, China. As of 2020, it administers the following 14 villages:

- Lianshan Village (练山村)
- Pingmei Village (平美村)
- Wuquan Village (武全村)
- Liangtian Village (良田村)
- Chenlong Village (陈龙村)
- Yuhua Village (宇华村)
- Huobu Village (活步村)
- Lidao Village (利道村)
- Pingtang Village (平塘村)
- Liuli Village (六利村)
- Guandong Village (官垌村)
- Tongchao Village (同朝村)
- Miaoke Village (妙客村)
- Xinya Village (新雅村)
