= Yongning, Nanning =

Yongning 邕宁区 · Yunghningz Gih Yungning
- District
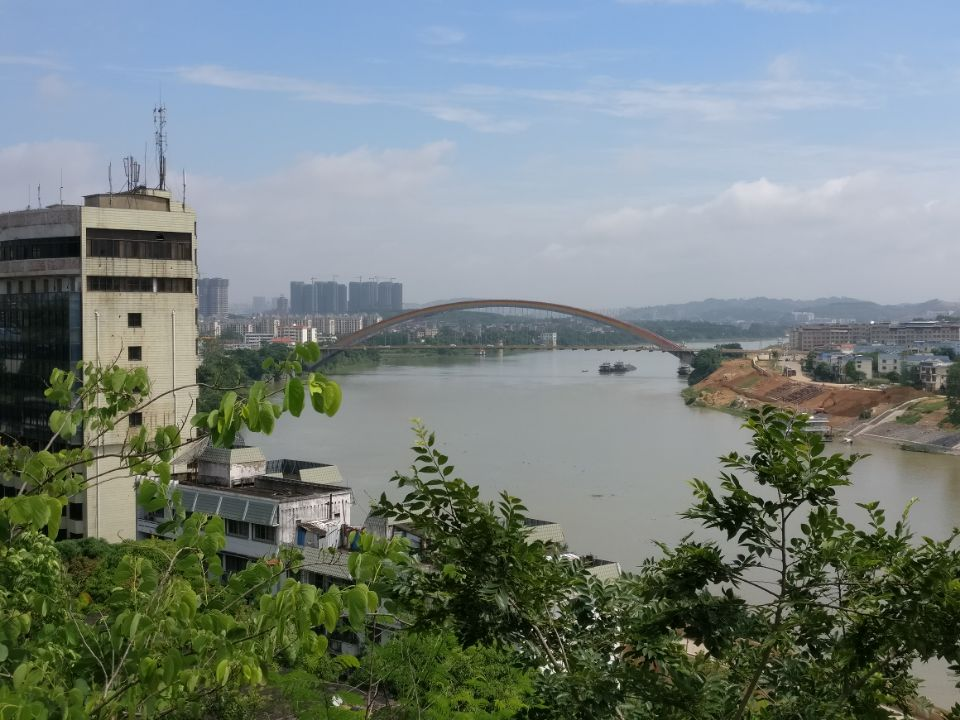

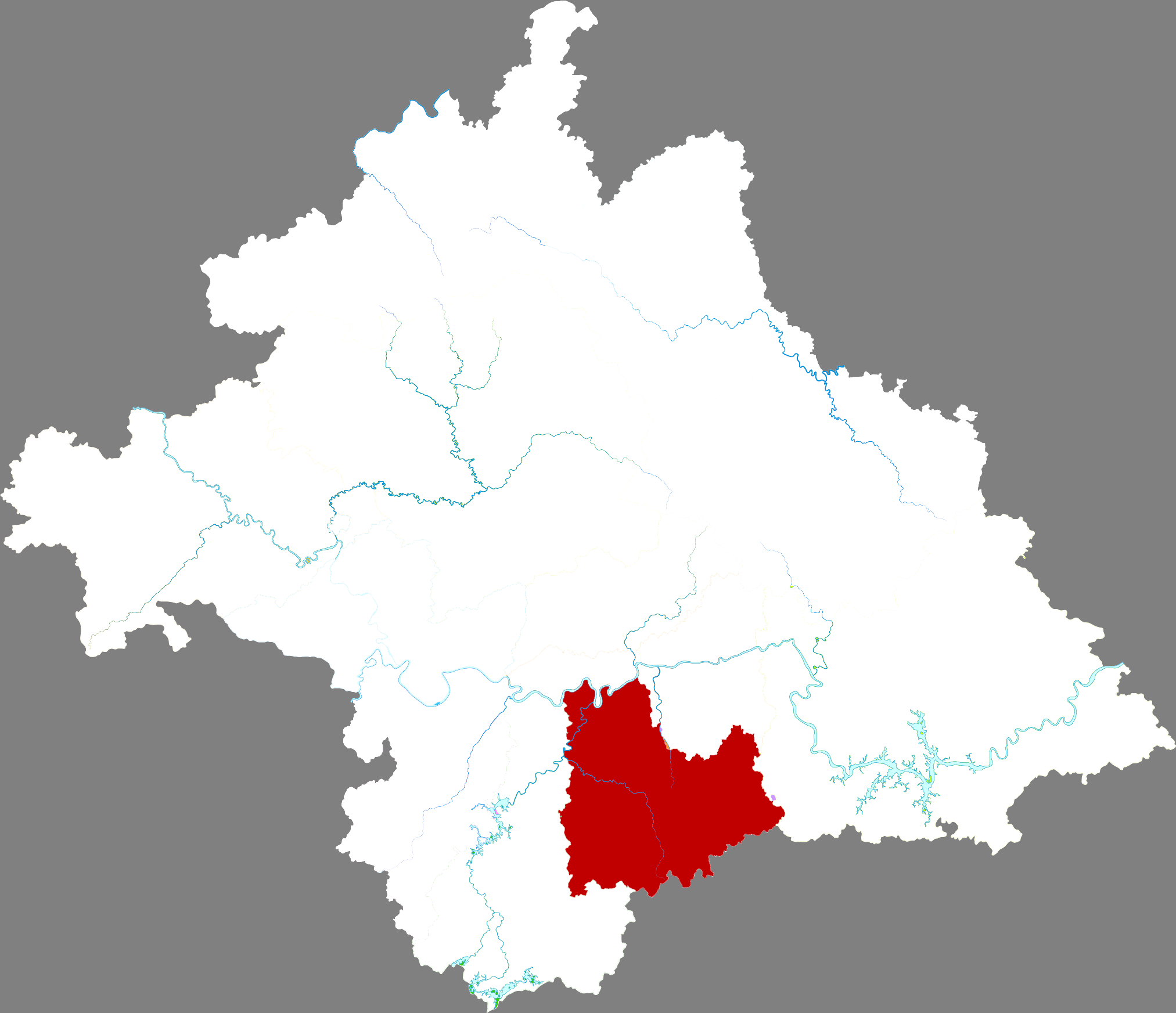
- Location in Nanning

- Location in Guangxi
- Coordinates: 22°44′56″N 108°29′41″E
- Country: China
- Autonomous region: Guangxi
- Prefecture-level city: Nanning
- District seat: Pumiao

Area
  - Total: 1,255 km^{2} (485 sq mi)

Population (2020)
  - Total: 362.800
  - Density: 0.2891/km^{2} (0.7487/sq mi)
- Time zone: UTC+8 (China Standard)
- GDP (2021): CN¥15.47billion
- Website: yongning.gov.cn

Yongning District (simplified Chinese: 邕宁区; traditional Chinese: 邕寧區; pinyin: Yōngníng Qū; Standard Zhuang: Yunghningz Gih) is one of 7 districts of the prefecture-level city of Nanning, the capital of Guangxi Zhuang Autonomous Region, South China. The district was approved to build from the dissolution of the former Yongning County (邕宁县) by the Chinese State Council on September 15, 2004. The district's total area is 1295 square kilometers, and its population in 2004 was 316,000 people.

== Administrative divisions ==
Yongning District administers 5 towns:

- Pumiao 蒲庙镇
- Nalou 那楼镇
- Xinjiang 新江镇
- Baiji 百济镇
- Zhonghe 中和镇

== Climate ==
Climate data for Yongning District, elevation 107 m (351 ft), (1991–2020 normals)
Month	Jan	Feb	Mar	Apr	May	Jun	Jul	Aug	Sep	Oct	Nov	Dec	Year
Mean daily maximum °C (°F)	17.3 (63.1)	19.2 (66.6)	21.8 (71.2)	27.2 (81.0)	30.9 (87.6)	32.3 (90.1)	32.9 (91.2)	33.1 (91.6)	32.1 (89.8)	29.1 (84.4)	24.9 (76.8)	20.0 (68.0)	26.7 (80.1)
Daily mean °C (°F)	13.3 (55.9)	15.1 (59.2)	18.0 (64.4)	23.0 (73.4)	26.4 (79.5)	28.1 (82.6)	28.5 (83.3)	28.4 (83.1)	27.2 (81.0)	24.1 (75.4)	19.8 (67.6)	15.2 (59.4)	22.3 (72.1)
Mean daily minimum °C (°F)	10.7 (51.3)	12.5 (54.5)	15.4 (59.7)	20.0 (68.0)	23.3 (73.9)	25.3 (77.5)	25.7 (78.3)	25.5 (77.9)	24.0 (75.2)	20.7 (69.3)	16.4 (61.5)	12.0 (53.6)	19.3 (66.7)
Average precipitation mm (inches)	40.9 (1.61)	31.0 (1.22)	61.0 (2.40)	75.5 (2.97)	174.8 (6.88)	216.8 (8.54)	222.4 (8.76)	193.5 (7.62)	111.2 (4.38)	65.3 (2.57)	42.2 (1.66)	34.6 (1.36)	1,269.2 (49.97)
Average precipitation days (≥ 0.1 mm)	9.6	9.6	13.8	12.2	13.9	16.4	16.6	15.4	9.7	6.8	6.9	7.2	138.1
Average relative humidity (%)	76	78	82	79	79	83	82	82	78	74	74	72	78
Mean monthly sunshine hours	64.3	60.0	57.6	103.3	152.7	155.4	187.9	193.3	187.2	175.5	132.6	108.7	1,578.5
Percentage possible sunshine	19	19	15	27	37	38	45	49	51	49	40	33	35
Source: China Meteorological Administration all-time extreme temperature Pogodaiklimat.ru (extremes)
