= Luoyang, Huanjiang County =

Luoyang 洛阳镇
- Town
- Location in Guangxi
- Coordinates: 24°58′34″N 108°11′28″E
- Country: People's Republic of China
- Autonomous region: Guangxi
- Prefecture-level city: Hechi
- Autonomous county: Huanjiang Maonan Autonomous County
- Incorporated (township): 1933
- Designated (town): 1984

Area
  - Total: 467.59 km^{2} (180.54 sq mi)

Population (2019)
  - Total: 48,949
  - Density: 104.68/km^{2} (271.13/sq mi)
- Time zone: UTC+08:00 (China Standard)
- Postal code: 547105
- Area code: 0778

Chinese name
- Simplified Chinese: 洛阳镇
- Traditional Chinese: 洛陽鎮
Transcriptions
Standard Mandarin
- Hanyu Pinyin: Luòyáng Zhèn

Luoyang (Chinese: 洛阳镇) is a town in Huanjiang Maonan Autonomous County, Guangxi, China. As of the 2019 census it had a population of 48,949 and an area of 467.59-square-kilometre (180.54 sq mi).

== Administrative division ==
As of 2021, the town is divided into three communities and twelve villages:

- Luoyang Community (洛阳社区)
- Hongyang Community (红阳社区)
- Hong'an Community (红安社区)
- Tuanjie (团结村)
- Pule (普乐村)
- Wenya (文雅村)
- Yong'an (永安村)
- Yongquan (永权村)
- Dimeng (地蒙村)
- Yuhe (玉合村)
- Yamai (雅脉村)
- Jiangkou (江口村)
- Guchang (古昌村)
- Hezuo (合作村)
- Miaoshi (妙石村)

== History ==
During the Qing dynasty (1644–1911), it belonged to Si'en County (思恩县).

In 1933 during the Republic of China, Luoyang Township was set up.

In 1950, it came under the jurisdiction of the 3rd District. In 1959, its name was renamed Luoyang People's Commune (洛阳人民公社) and then Luoyang District (洛阳区) in 1962. In 1984, it was upgraded to a town.

== Geography ==
The town is situated at the south central of Huanjiang Maonan Autonomous County. The town shares a border with Chuanshan Town and Xianan Township to the west, Da'an Township and Minglun Town to the east, Xunle Miao Ethnic Township to the north, and Si'en Town and Shuiyuan Town to the south.

The Dahuanjiang River (大环江河) flows through the town.

The town experiences a subtropical monsoon climate, with an average annual temperature of 18 °C (64 °F), total annual rainfall of 1,650-millimetre (65 in), a frost-free period of 290 days and annual average sunshine hours in 1451 hours.

== Economy ==
The town's economy is based on nearby mineral resources and agricultural resources. The main crops are rice and corn. Sugarcane is one of the important economic crops in the region. The region abounds with lead, zinc, antimony, iron and coal.

== Demographics ==
Historical population
| Year | Pop. | ±% |
|---|---|---|
| 2011 | 62,000 | — |
| 2019 | 48,949 | −21.1% |

The 2019 census reported the town had a population of 48,949.

== Transportation ==
The town is crossed by the Provincial Highway S309.
