= Minglun =

Minglun 明伦镇
- Town
- Location in Guangxi
- Coordinates: 25°12′58″N 108°24′35″E
- Country: People's Republic of China
- Autonomous region: Guangxi
- Prefecture-level city: Hechi
- Autonomous county: Huanjiang Maonan Autonomous County
- Incorporated (township): 1984
- Designated (town): 1995

Area
  - Total: 447.96 km^{2} (172.96 sq mi)

Population (2019)
  - Total: 41,149
  - Density: 91.859/km^{2} (237.91/sq mi)
- Time zone: UTC+08:00 (China Standard)
- Postal code: 547115
- Area code: 0778

Chinese name
- Simplified Chinese: 明伦镇
- Traditional Chinese: 明倫鎮
Transcriptions
Standard Mandarin
- Hanyu Pinyin: Mínglún Zhèn

Minglun (Chinese: 明伦镇) is a town in Huanjiang Maonan Autonomous County, Guangxi, China. As of the 2019 census it had a population of 41,149 and an area of 447.96 square kilometres (172.96 sq mi).

== Administrative division ==
As of 2021, the town is divided into one community and fifteen villages:

- Minglun Community (明伦社区)
- Yajing (雅京村)
- Longshui (龙水村)
- Xiangyao (相尧村)
- Baoshan (豹山村)
- Caibo (才帛村)
- Cuishan (翠山村)
- Baixiang (百祥村)
- Jixiang (吉祥村)
- Gancheng (干城村)
- Beisong (北宋村)
- Yinghao (英豪村)
- Bamian (八面村)
- Hekuang (合狂村)
- Haodong (豪洞村)
- Liuping (柳平村)

== History ==
The area belonged to Anhua Department (安化厅) in 1905, during the late Qing dynasty (1644–1911).

In 1912, it was renamed "Anhua County" (安化县) and soon renamed "Yibei County" (宜北县) in January 1914, and came under the jurisdiction of Liujiang Municipality (柳江道).

On 20 November 1949, the People's Liberation Army (PLA) took control of Yibei County and it came under the jurisdiction of Qingyuan Special District (庆远专区). One year later, it was under the jurisdiction of Yishan Special District (宜山专区). On 11 August 1952, Yibei County and Si'en County (思恩县) merged to form Huanjiang County (环江县), and the area belonged to Minglun District (明伦区). In 1958, Xianfeng People's Commune (先锋人民公社) was set up and one year later reverted to its former name of Minglun District. It was incorporated as a township in 1984. In 1995, it was upgraded to a town.

== Geography ==
The town is situated at the north of Huanjiang Maonan Autonomous County. It borders Xunle Miao Ethnic Township in the north, Dongxing Town and Longyan Township in the east, Da'an Township and Changmei Township in the south, and Luoyang Town in the west.

The highest point in the town is Dadingmao Mountain (大顶帽山) which stands 1,073.2 metres (3,521 ft) above sea level. The lowest point is located in the village of Hekuang (合狂村), which is at 253.1 metres (830 ft) above sea level.

There are two streams in the town: Shangbang Stream (上帮河) and Minglun Stream (明伦河).

=== Climate ===
The town is in the subtropical monsoon climate zone, with an average annual temperature of 18 °C (64 °F), total annual rainfall of 1,300 millimetres (51 in), and a frost-free period of 306 days.

== Economy ==
The economy is supported primarily by agriculture and mineral resources. Significant crops include rice and corn. Sugarcane is one of the important economic crops in the region. The region abounds with anthracite, lead, zinc, and pyrrhotite.

== Demographics ==
Historical population
Year	Pop.	±%
2011	38,122	—
2019	41,149	+7.9%

The 2019 census reported the town had a population of 41,149.

== Tourist attractions ==
The Former Residence of Lu Tao (卢焘将军故里) is a popular attraction.

== Transportation ==
The town is crossed by the Provincial Highway S209.

== Notable people ==
- Lu Tao (1882–1949), general of the Republic of China and governor of Guizhou.
- Lu Xianbian (born 1962), Chinese Communist politician, vice chairperson of the Guangxi People's Congress.
- Qin Zhan (覃展), Chinese Communist politician.
