= Changmei Township =

Changmei Township 长美乡
- Township
- Location in Guangxi
- Coordinates: 24°57′19″N 108°28′09″E
- Country: People's Republic of China
- Autonomous region: Guangxi
- Prefecture-level city: Hechi
- Autonomous county: Huanjiang Maonan Autonomous County
- Incorporated (township): 1933

Area
  - Total: 238.17 km^{2} (91.96 sq mi)

Population (2019)
  - Total: 15,881
  - Density: 66.679/km^{2} (172.70/sq mi)
- Time zone: UTC+08:00 (China Standard)
- Postal code: 547116
- Area code: 0778

Chinese name
- Simplified Chinese: 长美乡
- Traditional Chinese: 長美鄉
Transcriptions
Standard Mandarin
- Hanyu Pinyin: Chángměi Xiāng

Changmei Township (Chinese: 长美乡) is a township in Huanjiang Maonan Autonomous County, Guangxi, China. As of the 2019 census it had a population of 15,881 and an area of 238.17-square-kilometre (91.96 sq mi).

== Administrative division ==
As of 2021, the township is divided into one community and five villages:

- Changmei Community (长美社区)
- Neitong (内同村)
- Bafu (八福村)
- Neidian (内典村)
- Guan'an (关安村)
- Aidong (爱洞村)

== History ==
The area belonged to Si'en County (思恩县) during the Qing dynasty (1644–1911).

In 1933 during the Republic of China, Changzhi Township (长治乡) was set up.

In 1950, it came under the jurisdiction of the Fifth District. In 1958, its name was changed to Da'an People's Commune (大安人民公社). It was incorporated as a township in September 1984.

== Geography ==
The township is situated at the eastern of Huanjiang Maonan Autonomous County. It is bordered to the north by Minglun Town and Dongxing Town, to the east by Jian'ai Township, to the south by Yizhou District, and to the west by Da'an Township.

The highest point in the township is Yangjiao Mountain (羊角山) which stands 1,169 metres (3,835 ft) above sea level. The lowest point is the village of Bafu (八福村), which, at 167 metres (548 ft) above sea level.

The Zhongzhou Stream (中洲河) flows through the township.

== Economy ==
The economy is supported primarily by agriculture and mineral resources. The main crops of the region are rice, followed by corn and soybean. Sugarcane is one of the important economic crops in the region. The region also has an abundance of iron, aluminum, zinc, silicon, and crystal.

== Demographics ==
Historical population
Year	Pop.	±%
2011	14,346	—
2019	15,881	+10.7%

The 2019 census showed the township's population to be 15,881, an increase of 10.7% from the 2011 census.
