= Xunle Miao Ethnic Township =

Xunle Miao Ethnic Township 驯乐苗族乡
- Ethnic township
- Location in Guangxi
- Coordinates: 25°23′34″N 108°15′28″E
- Country: People's Republic of China
- Autonomous region: Guangxi
- Prefecture-level city: Hechi
- Autonomous county: Huanjiang Maonan Autonomous County
- Incorporated (township): 1933

Area
  - Total: 590 km^{2} (230 sq mi)

Population (2019)
  - Total: 28,563
  - Density: 48/km^{2} (130/sq mi)
- Time zone: UTC+08:00 (China Standard)
- Postal code: 547119
- Area code: 0778

Chinese name
- Simplified Chinese: 驯乐苗族乡
- Traditional Chinese: 馴樂苗族鄉
Transcriptions
Standard Mandarin
- Hanyu Pinyin: Xùnlè Miáozú Xiāng

Xunle Miao Ethnic Township (Chinese: 驯乐苗族乡) is an ethnic township in Huanjiang Maonan Autonomous County, Guangxi, China. As of the 2019 census it had a population of 28,563 and an area of 590-square-kilometre (230 sq mi).

== Administrative division ==
As of 2021, the township is divided into two communities and ten villages:

- Fushou Community (福寿社区)
- Pingzhi Community (平治社区)
- Pingmo (平莫村)
- Taiping (太平村)
- Quan'an (全安村)
- Shangang (山岗村)
- Daji (大吉村)
- Beishan (北山村)
- Zhenbei (镇北村)
- Kangning (康宁村)
- Changbei (长北村)
- Shunning (顺宁村)

== History ==
The area belonged to Anhua Department (安化厅) during the Qing dynasty (1644–1911).

In 1933 during the Republic of China, Xunle Township and Dao'an Township were founded and came under the jurisdiction of Yibei County (宜北县).

In August 1951, it was under the jurisdiction of the 8th District. In February 1972, Shangchao Town (上朝镇) was set up here. In 1984, it was renamed Xunle Miao Ethnic Township. In 2005, Shangchao Town was merged into the township.

== Geography ==
The township lies at the northern of Huanjiang Maonan Autonomous County, bordering Chuanshan Town and Libo County to the west, Luoyang Town to the south, Congjiang County to the north, and Longyan Township and Minglun Town to the east.

The township enjoys a subtropical humid monsoon climate, enjoying four distinct seasons and abundant precipitation. Its average temperature is 16.4 °C (61.5 °F).

== Economy ==
The township's economy is based on nearby mineral resources and agricultural resources. The region abounds with coal, lead, zinc, iron, arsenopyrite, vanadium, and manganese. The main crops are rice and corn. Castanea mollissima is one of the important economic crops in the region.

== Demographics ==
Historical population
Year	Pop.	±%
2011	30,300	—
2019	28,563	−5.7%

The 2019 census reported the township had a population of 28563.
