= Da'an Township =

Da'an Township 大安乡
- Township
- Location in Guangxi
- Coordinates: 24°55′00″N 108°19′16″E
- Country: People's Republic of China
- Autonomous region: Guangxi
- Prefecture-level city: Hechi
- Autonomous county: Huanjiang Maonan Autonomous County
- Incorporated (township): 1933

Area
  - Total: 220.87 km^{2} (85.28 sq mi)

Population (2019)
  - Total: 21,805
  - Density: 98.723/km^{2} (255.69/sq mi)
- Time zone: UTC+08:00 (China Standard)
- Postal code: 547114
- Area code: 0778

Chinese name
- Simplified Chinese: 大安乡
- Traditional Chinese: 大安鄉
Transcriptions
Standard Mandarin
- Hanyu Pinyin: Dà'ān Xiāng

Da'an Township (Chinese: 大安乡) is a township in Huanjiang Maonan Autonomous County, Guangxi, China. As of the 2019 census it had a population of 21,805 and an area of 220.87-square-kilometre (85.28 sq mi).

== Administrative division ==
As of 2021, the township is divided into one community and six villages:

- Da'an Community (大安社区)
- Dingxin (顶新村)
- Ke'ai (可爱村)
- Caiping (才平村)
- Tangfang (塘房村)
- Huanjie (环界村)
- Jinqiao (金桥村)

== History ==
The area belonged to Si'en County (思恩县) during the Qing dynasty (1644–1911).

In 1933 during the Republic of China, Da'an Township was founded.

In 1950, it came under the jurisdiction of the 5th District (also known as Da'an District). In August 1958, its name was changed to Da'an People's Commune (大安人民公社). In 1984, Da'an People's Commune was revoked and reverted to its former name of Da'an Township.

== Geography ==
The township is situated at the southeastern of Huanjiang Maonan Autonomous County. It is surrounded by Minglun Town on the north, Luoyang Town on the west, Changmei Township on the east, and Dacai Township, Si'en Town and Yizhou District on the south.

The Dahuanjiang River (大环江河) flows through the township.

The township is in the subtropical monsoon climate zone, with an average annual temperature of 19.9 °C (67.8 °F), total annual rainfall of 1,400-millimetre (55 in), a frost-free period of 300 days and annual average sunshine hours in 1060.7 hours.

== Economy ==
The economy of the township is supported primarily by agriculture and mineral resources. The region has an abundance of copper, ferrosulfur, lead, zinc, and calcite. Significant crops include rice and corn. Sugarcane is one of the important economic crops in the region.

== Demographics ==
Historical population
Year	Pop.	±%
2011	21,511	—
2019	21,805	+1.4%

The 2019 census reported the township had a population of 21,805.
