= Si'en =

Si'en 思恩镇
- Town
- Location in Guangxi
- Coordinates: 24°49′56″N 108°15′19″E
- Country: People's Republic of China
- Autonomous region: Guangxi
- Prefecture-level city: Hechi
- Autonomous county: Huanjiang Maonan Autonomous County
- Designated (town): 1984

Area
  - Total: 277.99 km^{2} (107.33 sq mi)

Population (2019)
  - Total: 52,755
  - Density: 189.77/km^{2} (491.51/sq mi)
- Time zone: UTC+08:00 (China Standard)
- Postal code: 547100
- Area code: 0778

Chinese name
- Simplified Chinese: 思恩镇
- Traditional Chinese: 思恩鎮
Transcriptions
Standard Mandarin
- Hanyu Pinyin: Sī'ēn Zhèn

Si'en (Chinese: 思恩镇) is a town in Huanjiang Maonan Autonomous County, Guangxi, China. As of the 2019 census it had a population of 52,755 and an area of 277.99-square-kilometre (107.33 sq mi).

== Administrative division ==
As of 2021, the town is divided into two communities and twelve villages:

- Chengbei Community (城北社区)
- Chengnan Community (城南社区)
- Zhongshan (中山村)
- Dieling (叠岭村)
- Chenshuang (陈双村)
- Zhongxing (中兴村)
- Xi'nan (西南村)
- Naihe (耐禾村)
- Sanle (三乐村)
- Anliang (安良村)
- Renhe (人和村)
- Qingtan (清潭村)
- Wenhua (文化村)
- Fulong (福龙村)

== History ==
The region was historically called Si'en County and Yibei County (宜北县). Si'en County (思恩县) was controlled by the People's Liberation Army (PLA) in November 1949 and came under the jurisdiction of Qingyuan Special District (庆远专区).

In August 1952, Si'en County was revoked and Huanjiang County was set up, which was under the jurisdiction of Yishan Special District (宜山专区). In 1958, its name was changed to Red Flag People's Commune (红旗人民公社) and belonged to Liuzhou Special District (柳州专区). One year later, it split into two communes: Chengguan People's Commune (城管人民公社) and Dacai People's Commune (大才人民公社) and soon merged to form Chengguan District (城管区) in 1962. In May 1965, it came under the jurisdiction of Hechi Special District (河池专区). In 1968, it reverted to its former name of Chengguan People's Commune (城管人民公社). In 1984, it was upgraded to a town named Si'en (思恩镇), which is still in use now.

== Geography ==
The town lies at the south of Huanjiang Maonan Autonomous County, bordering Shuiyuan Town to the west, Jinchengjiang District to the south, Luoyang Town and Da'an Township to the north, and Dacai Township to the east.

The Huanjiang River (环江河) flows through the town north to south.

=== Climate ===
The town experiences a subtropical monsoon climate, with an average annual temperature of 19.9 °C (67.8 °F) and total annual rainfall of 1,750-millimetre (69 in). The highest temperature ever recorded in the town was 39.1 °C (102.4 °F) on 21 August 1990, and the coldest was −5.2 °C (22.6 °F) on 5 January 1962.

== Economy ==
The economy of the town has a predominantly agricultural orientation, including farming and pig-breeding. The main crops are rice and corn. Sugarcane is one of the important economic crops in the region.

== Demographics ==
Historical population
Year	Pop.	±%
2011	45,145	—
2019	52,755	+16.9%

The 2019 census showed the town's population to be 52,755, an increase of 16.9% from the 2011 census.

== Tourist attractions ==
The Aishan Forest Park (爱山森林公园) is located within the town limits and has camping, swimming, boating, fishing, rodeos, dancing and sporting events.

== Transportation ==
The Provincial Highway S205 passes across the town north to south.

The town is crossed by the Guiyang–Nanning high-speed railway.
