= Dacai Township =

Dacai Township 大才乡
- Township
- Location in Guangxi
- Coordinates: 24°45′42″N 108°22′10″E
- Country: People's Republic of China
- Autonomous region: Guangxi
- Prefecture-level city: Hechi
- Autonomous county: Huanjiang Maonan Autonomous County
- Incorporated (township): 1933

Area
  - Total: 128.39 km^{2} (49.57 sq mi)

Population (2019)
  - Total: 13,440
  - Density: 104.7/km^{2} (271.1/sq mi)
- Time zone: UTC+08:00 (China Standard)
- Postal code: 547100
- Area code: 0778

Chinese name
- Simplified Chinese: 大才乡
- Traditional Chinese: 大才鄉
Transcriptions
Standard Mandarin
- Hanyu Pinyin: Dàcái Xiāng

Dacai Township (Chinese: 大才乡) is a township in Huanjiang Maonan Autonomous County, Guangxi, China. As of the 2019 census it had a population of 13,440 and an area of 128.39-square-kilometre (49.57 sq mi).

== Administrative division ==
As of 2021, the township is divided into one community and six villages:

- Dacai Community (大才社区)
- Tongjin (同进村)
- Xinpo (新坡村)
- Dama (大麻村)
- Nuanhuo (暧和村)
- Sanhe (三合村)
- Chonglou (重楼村)

== History ==
The area used to be in the territory of Tang Empire (618–907). In 1075, in the ruling of Emperor Shenzong of Song dynasty (907–1279), it was merged into Si'en County (思恩县).

In 1933 during the Republic of China, Tianshi Township (天时乡) was set up.

In 1958, the "Dacai Red Flag People's Commune" (大才红旗人民公社) was founded and one year later renamed Chengguan People's Commune" (城管人民公社). In 1962, its name was changed to Chengguan District (城管区). It was incorporated as a township in 1984.

== Geography ==
The township lies at the eastern of Huanjiang Maonan Autonomous County, bordering Si'en Town to the west, Da'an Township to the north, and Yizhou District to the east and south.

The highest point in the township is Dawang Mountain (大望山), which, at 800 metres (2,600 ft) above sea level.

=== Climate ===
The township is in the subtropical monsoon climate zone, with an average annual temperature of 20 °C (68 °F), total annual rainfall of 1,411.9-millimetre (55.59 in), a frost-free period of 329 days and annual average sunshine hours in 1244.8 hours.

== Economy ==
The local economy is primarily based upon agriculture. Significant crops include rice and corn. Sugarcane is one of the important economic crops in the region.

== Demographics ==
Historical population
Year	Pop.	±%
2011	12,791	—
2019	13,440	+5.1%

The 2019 census showed the township's population to be 13,440, an increase of 5.1% from the 2011 census.

== Transportation ==
The Provincial Highway S205 passes across the southwestern township.

== Tourist attractions ==
Longjiao Temple (龙角寺) is a Buddhist temple in the township.
