= Shuiyuan =

Shuiyuan may refer to:

- Shuiyuan, Guangxi, a town in Huanjiang Maonan Autonomous County, Guangxi, China
- Shuiyuan, Dashiqiao, a town in Dashiqiao, Liaoning, China
- Shuiyuan, Gansu, a town in Yongchang County, Jinchang, Gansu, China
- Shuiyuan Township, Xunwu County, a township in Xunwu County, Jiangxi, China
