= Longyan Township =

Longyan Township 龙岩乡
- Township
- Location in Guangxi Longyan Township (China)
- Coordinates: 25°16′18″N 108°29′13″E
- Country: People's Republic of China
- Autonomous region: Guangxi
- Prefecture-level city: Hechi
- Autonomous county: Huanjiang Maonan Autonomous County
- Incorporated (township): 1933

Area
  - Total: 409.99 km^{2} (158.30 sq mi)

Population (2019)
  - Total: 23,309
  - Density: 56.853/km^{2} (147.25/sq mi)
- Time zone: UTC+08:00 (China Standard)
- Postal code: 547110
- Area code: 0778

Chinese name
- Simplified Chinese: 龙岩乡
- Traditional Chinese: 龍岩鄉
Transcriptions
Standard Mandarin
- Hanyu Pinyin: Lóngyán Xiāng

Longyan Township (Chinese: 龙岩乡) is a township in Huanjiang Maonan Autonomous County, Guangxi, China. As of the 2019 census it had a population of 23,309 and an area of 409.99 square kilometres (158.30 sq mi).

== Administrative division ==
As of 2021, the township is divided into one community and twelve villages:

- Longyan Community (龙岩社区)
- Anshan (安山村)
- Dake (达科村)
- Jiule (久乐村)
- Liangxing (良兴村)
- Kenlan (肯兰村)
- Chaoge (朝阁村)
- Jiuwei (久伟村)
- Chenghuang (城皇村)
- Dadong (达洞村)
- Huangzhong (黄种村)
- Ganyan (敢岩村)
- Guangrong (广荣村)

== History ==
The area belonged to Anhua Department (安化厅) during the Qing dynasty (1644–1911).

In 1933 during the Republic of China, Zhi'an Township (治安乡) was founded and was under the jurisdiction of Yibei County (宜北县).

In 1951, Zhi'an Township and Chongxing Township (崇兴乡) were merged to form the 7th District. It was renamed the Rocket People's Commune (火箭人民公社) in 1958 and one year later renamed Longyan People's Commune (龙岩人民公社). In 1962, its name was changed to Longyan District (龙岩区). It was incorporated as a township in 1984.

== Geography ==
The township is situated at the northeastern of Huanjiang Maonan Autonomous County. It is surrounded by Congjiang County on the north, Xunle Miao Ethnic Township on the west, Rongshui Miao Autonomous County on the east, and the towns of Dongxing and Minglun on the south.

== Economy ==
The economy of the township has a predominantly agricultural orientation, including farming and pig-breeding. Significant crops include rice and corn. Vegetables are the economic plants of this region.

== Demographics ==
Historical population
Year	Pop.	±%
2011	23,055	—
2019	23,309	+1.1%

The 2019 census reported the township had a population of 23,309.

== Tourist attractions ==
The Former Residence of Wei Jixing (韦继兴故里) is a well known tourist spot in the township.

== Transportation ==
The County Road X837 passes across the township north to south.
