= Chuanshan =

Chuanshan may refer to the following locations in the People's Republic of China:

- Chuanshan Archipelago (川山群岛), group of islands in the South China Sea, just off the coast of Guangdong
- Chuanshan District (船山区), Suining, Sichuan
- Chuanshan, Huanjiang County (川山镇), town in Huanjiang Maonan Autonomous County, Guangxi
- Chuanshan, Liujiang County (穿山镇), town in Guangxi
