= Xianan Township =

Xianan Township 下南乡
- Township
- Location in Guangxi
- Coordinates: 24°58′00″N 107°59′58″E
- Country: People's Republic of China
- Autonomous region: Guangxi
- Prefecture-level city: Hechi
- Autonomous county: Huanjiang Maonan Autonomous County
- Incorporated (township): 1933

Area
  - Total: 253.87 km^{2} (98.02 sq mi)

Population (2019)
  - Total: 18,661
  - Density: 73.506/km^{2} (190.38/sq mi)
- Time zone: UTC+08:00 (China Standard)
- Postal code: 547103
- Area code: 0778

Chinese name
- Simplified Chinese: 下南乡
- Traditional Chinese: 下南鄉
Transcriptions
Standard Mandarin
- Hanyu Pinyin: Xiànán Xiāng

Xianan Township (Chinese: 下南乡) is a township in Huanjiang Maonan Autonomous County, Guangxi, China. As of the 2019 census it had a population of 18,661 and an area of 253.87-square-kilometre (98.02 sq mi).

== Administrative division ==
As of 2021, the township is divided into one community and ten villages:

- Xianan Community (下南社区)
- Bochuan (波川村)
- Yifeng (仪凤村)
- Zhongnan (中南村)
- Guzhou (古周村)
- Tangba (堂八村)
- Yuhuan (玉环村)
- Xiyuan (希远村)
- Jingyang (景阳村)
- Xiatang (下塘村)
- Caimen (才门村)

== History ==
During the Qing dynasty (1644–1911), it belonged to Si'en County (思恩县).

In 1933 during the Republic of China, Xianan Township was set up.

In 1950, it came under the jurisdiction of the Fourth District. In 1955, its name was changed to Xianan District (下南区). It was renamed Heping People's Commune (和平人民公社) in 1958 and Xianan People's Commune (下南人民公社) in 1959. In 1984, Xianan Township was renamed "Xianan Maonan Ethnic Township" (下南毛南族乡). In 1987, it reverted to its former name of Xianan Township.

== Geography ==
The township lies at the southwestern of Huanjiang Maonan Autonomous County, bordering Nandan County to the west, Jinchengjiang District to the south, Chuanshan Town to the north, and Shuiyuan Town to the east.

The Dagou River (打狗河) flows through the township north to south.

== Economy ==
The township's economy is based on nearby mineral resources and agricultural resources. The main crops are rice, corn, soybean and sweet potato. Sugarcane is one of the important economic crops in the region. The region abounds with calcite, marble, clay, talc, and hematite.

== Demographics ==
Historical population
Year	Pop.	±%
2011	19,000	—
2019	18,661	−1.8%

The 2019 census showed the township's population to be 18,661, a decrease of -1.8% from the 2011 census.
