= Dongxing, Huanjiang County =

Dongxingzhen 东兴镇 · Dunghhingh Zen
- Town
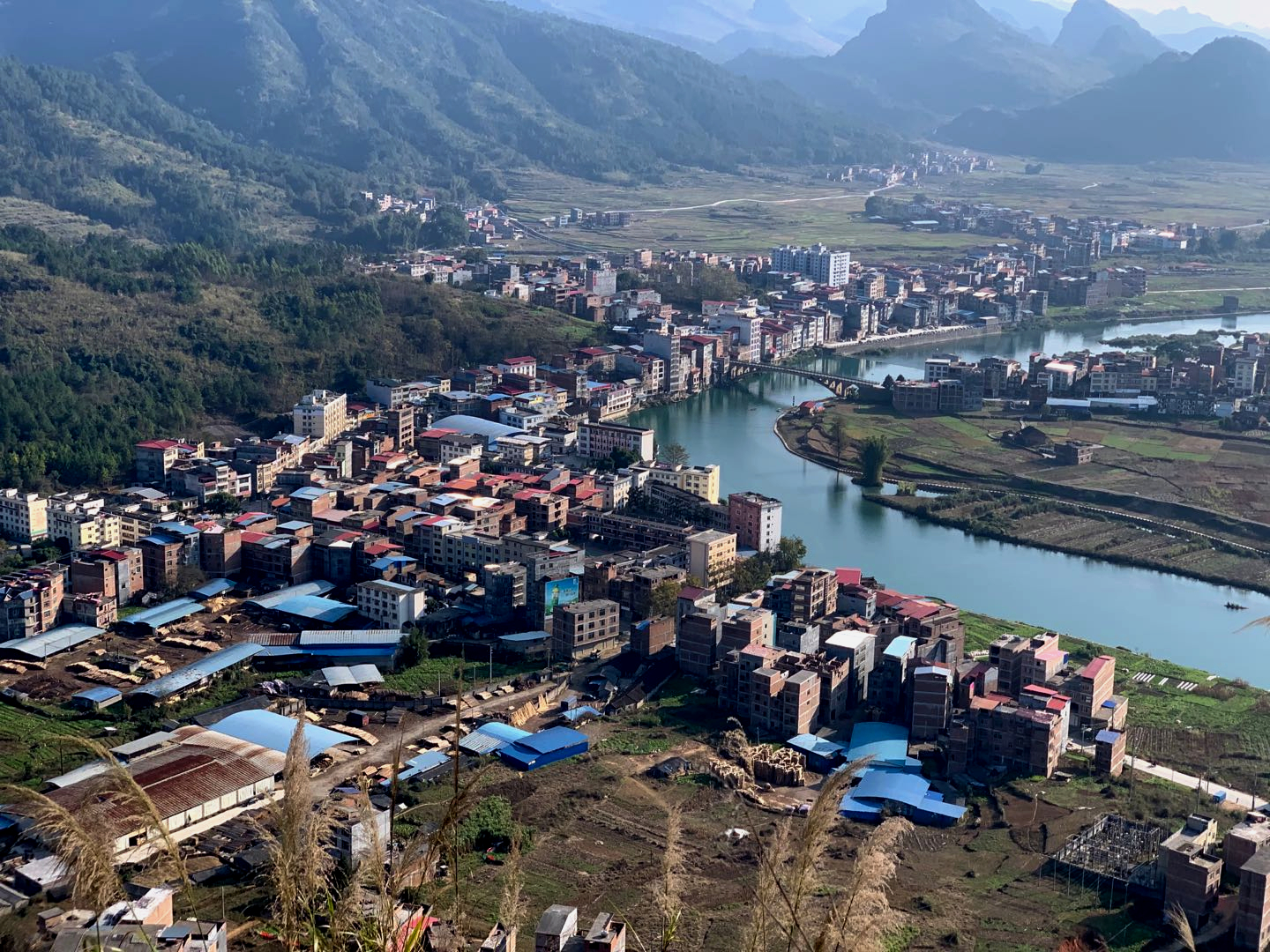
- Dongxing skyline

- Location in Guangxi
- Coordinates (Dongxing Town Center): 25°10′17.6″N 108°32′36.6″E
- Country: China
- Region: Guangxi
- Prefecture-level city: Hechi
- County: Huanjiang

Population
  - Total: 25,000
- Time zone: UTC+8 (China Standard)
- Postal code: 547117

Dongxing (simplified Chinese: 东兴镇; traditional Chinese: 東興鎮; pinyin: Dōngxīng zhèn; Zhuang: Dunghhingh Zen) is a town under the administration of Huanjiang Maonan Autonomous County, Guangxi, China, located in the northeast of the county. The town itself is inhabited mainly by Zhuang People speaking the Guibei dialect of Zhuang Language but there are also sizeable amounts of Yao, Miao, Maonan, Han and Sui. The town is composed of Donxing Town with its adjacent villages Banmao (Chinese: 板帽) and Dongxing Village (Chinese: 达贡屯) and it previously held a township status.

== Description ==
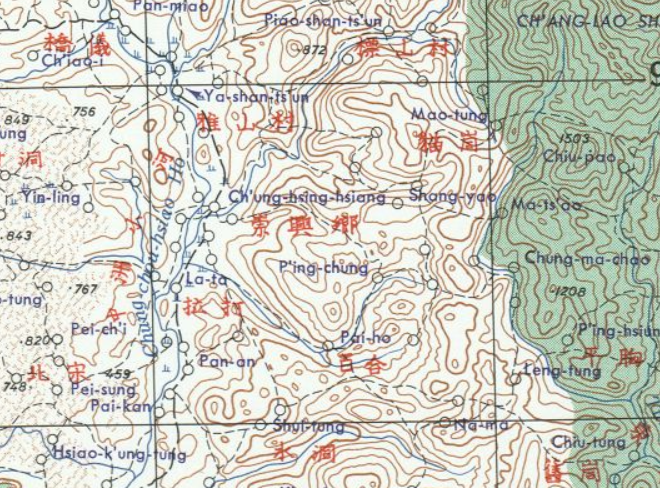
1955 US Army map of, what was known before as, Dongxing Township (東興鄉)

Donxing Town is built on both sides of the river bank of Xiaohuangjiang (Chinese: 小环江) river, commonly known as Zhongzhouhe (Chinese: 中洲河), a river with great importance for the economy and agriculture of Dongxing but which faces concerning levels of pollution and flooding in the last decade. People are often seen fishing on boats or from the river bank, while during the Dragon Boat Festival, the river is a source of festive events and family gatherings. Because the town is built on both sides of the river, it is linked by a 50-metre-long (160 ft) bridge which is due to be replaced, and connects the central road of Dongxing (X873) with Banmao. The town features a wet market, kindergarten, a grade school and middle school, a small public park, many street vendors for outdoor barbecue, convenience stores and hotels. Most of the town's economical output is based on logging, quarrying, retail and subsidence agriculture. On specific days of the week, farmers from nearby villages gather in Dongxing to promote and sell their produce. During Chinese New Year, an inter-village youth basketball competition takes place at the local public basketball stadium.

Intercity transportation is available through regular coaches which stop by in Dongxing and connect with Jinchengjiang, Huanjiang and Longyan (Chinese: 龙岩乡).

The town experiences a declining population due in part to emigration of its youth to study, work and live in the more urban adjacent cities like Huanjiang and Jinchengjiang, while during Chinese New Year they return to celebrate with their traditional families commonly referred as "Laojia" (Chinese: 老家).

== Gallery ==
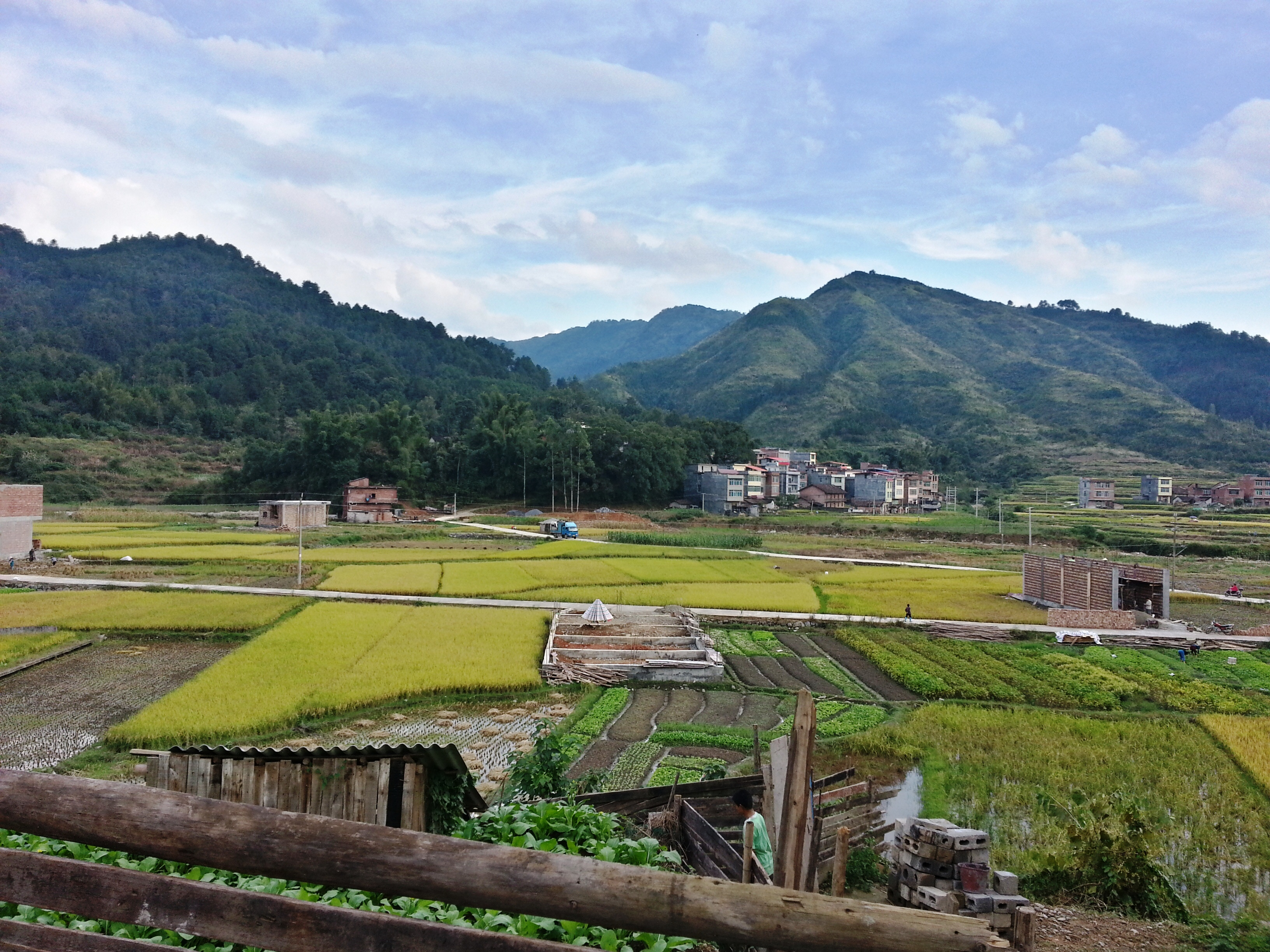
Dongxing Village

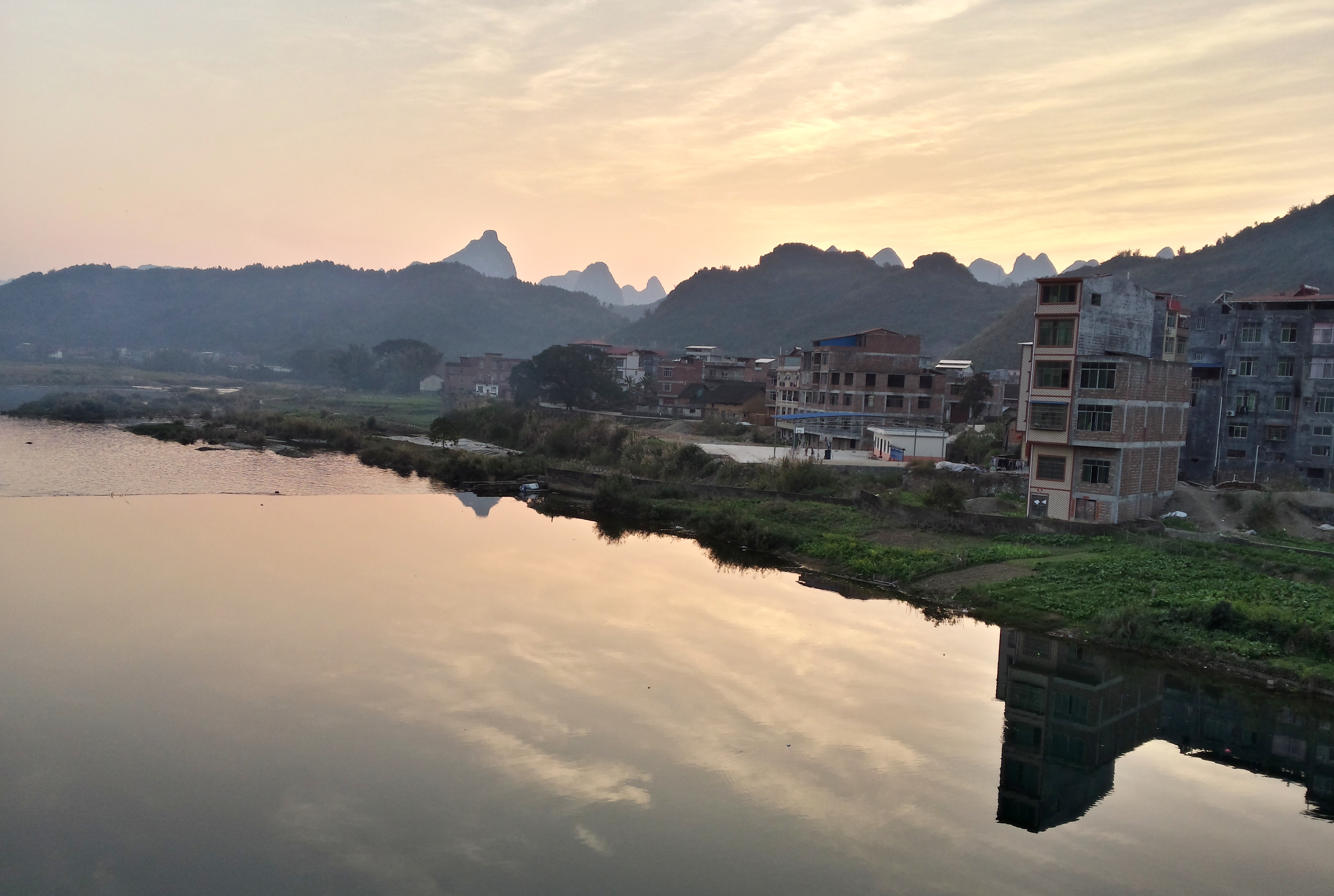
View of Banmao from the bridge

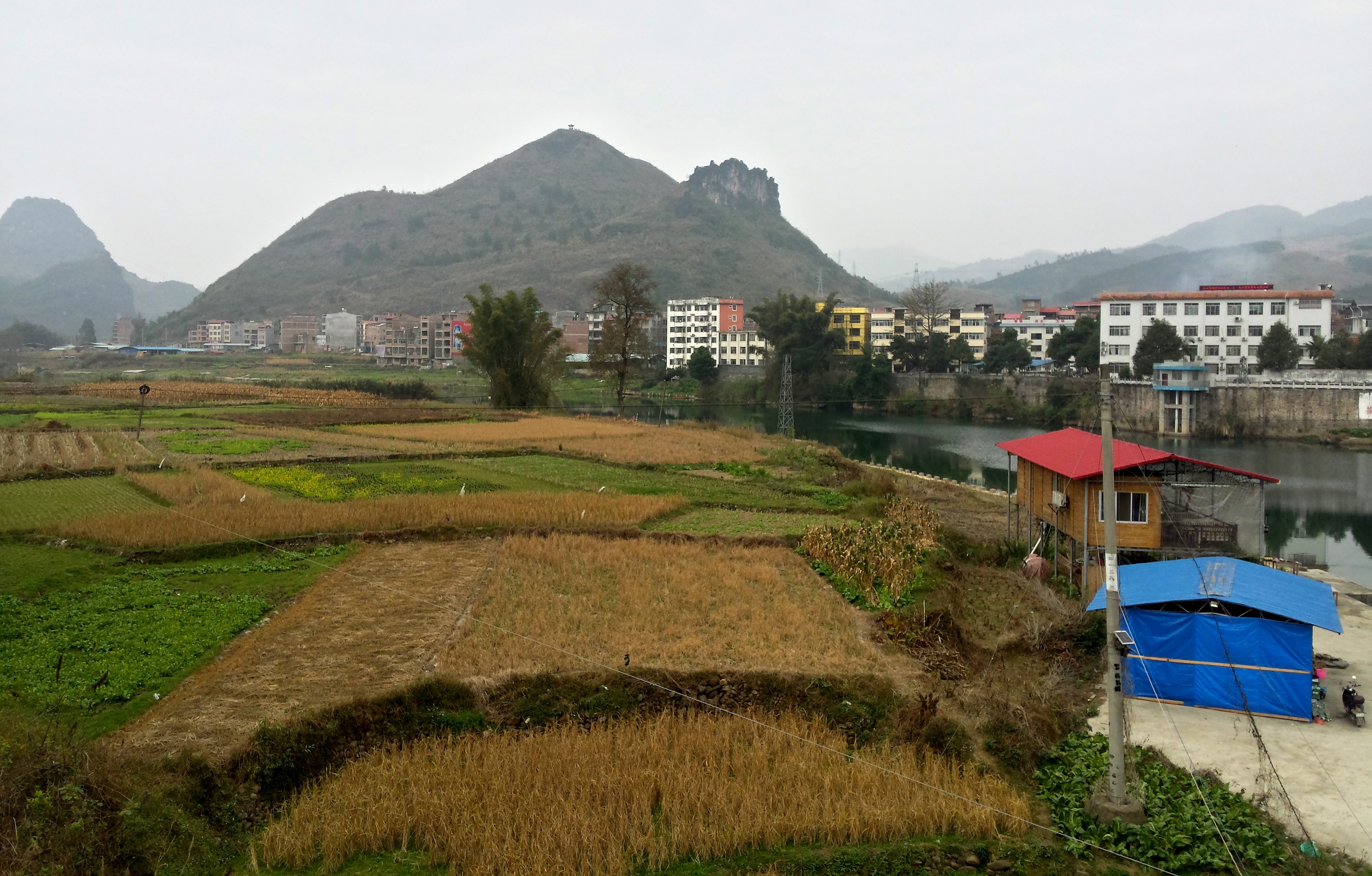
Crop fields on the outskirts

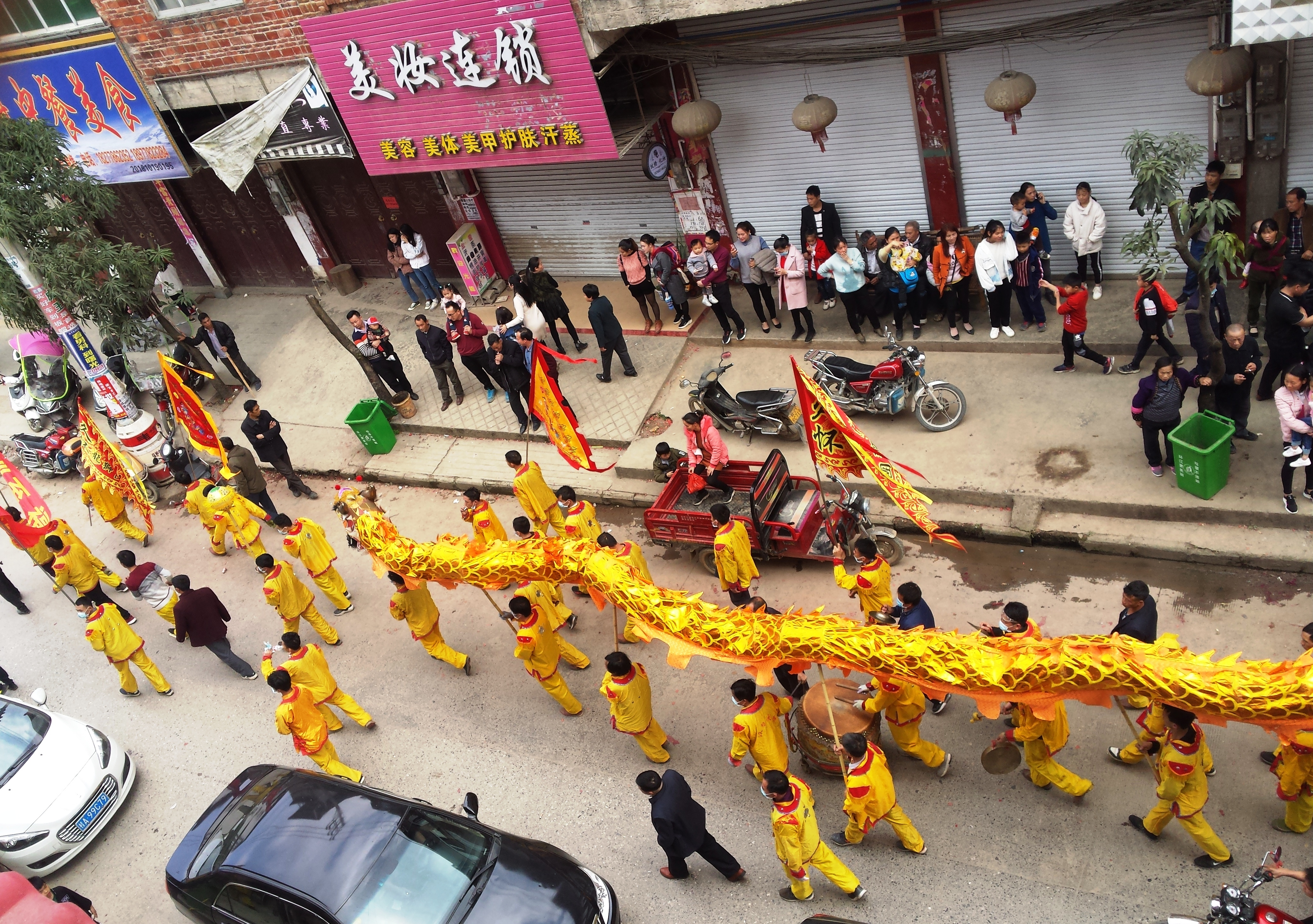
Dragon Dance during Spring Festival

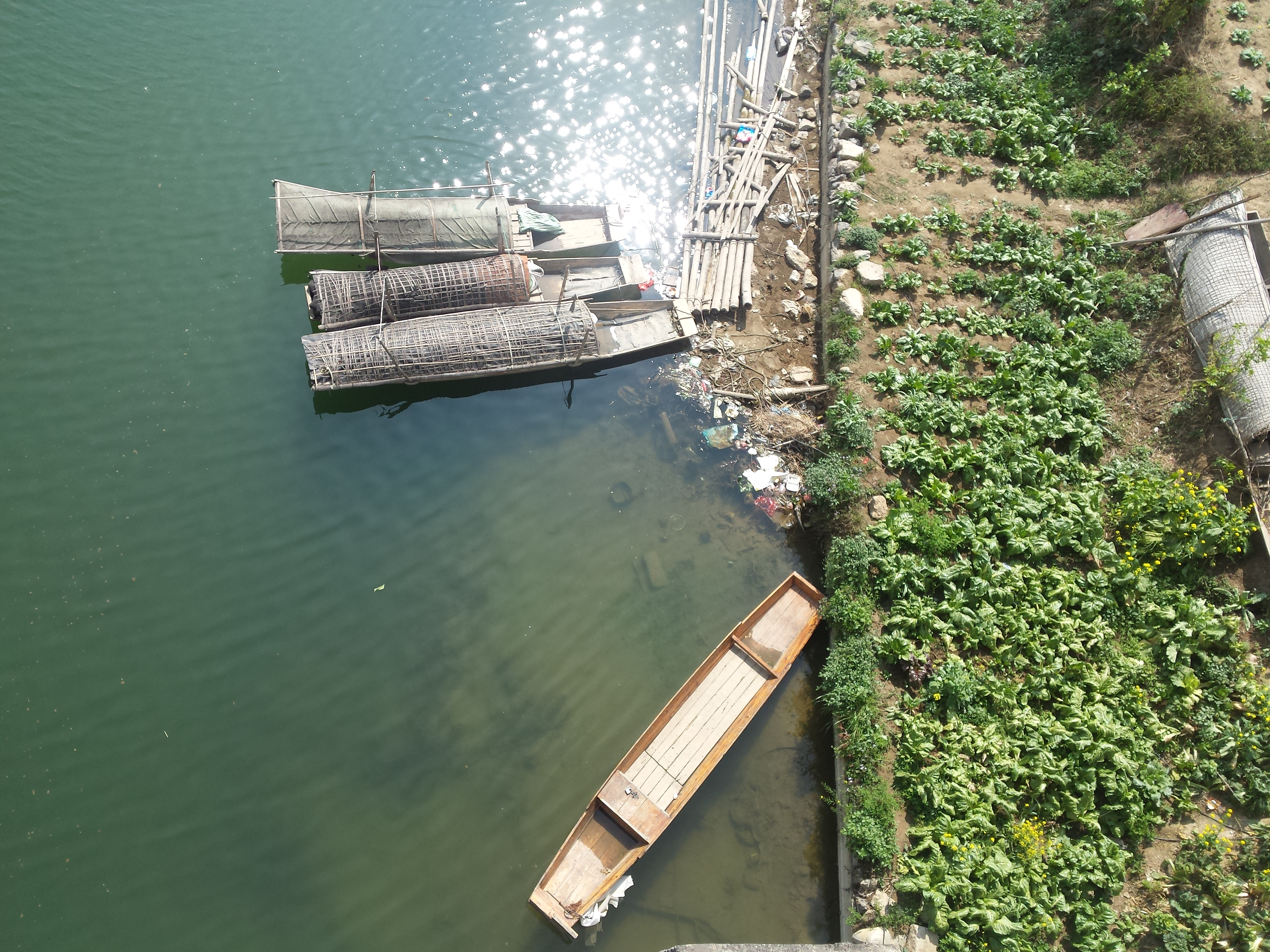
Above the bridge

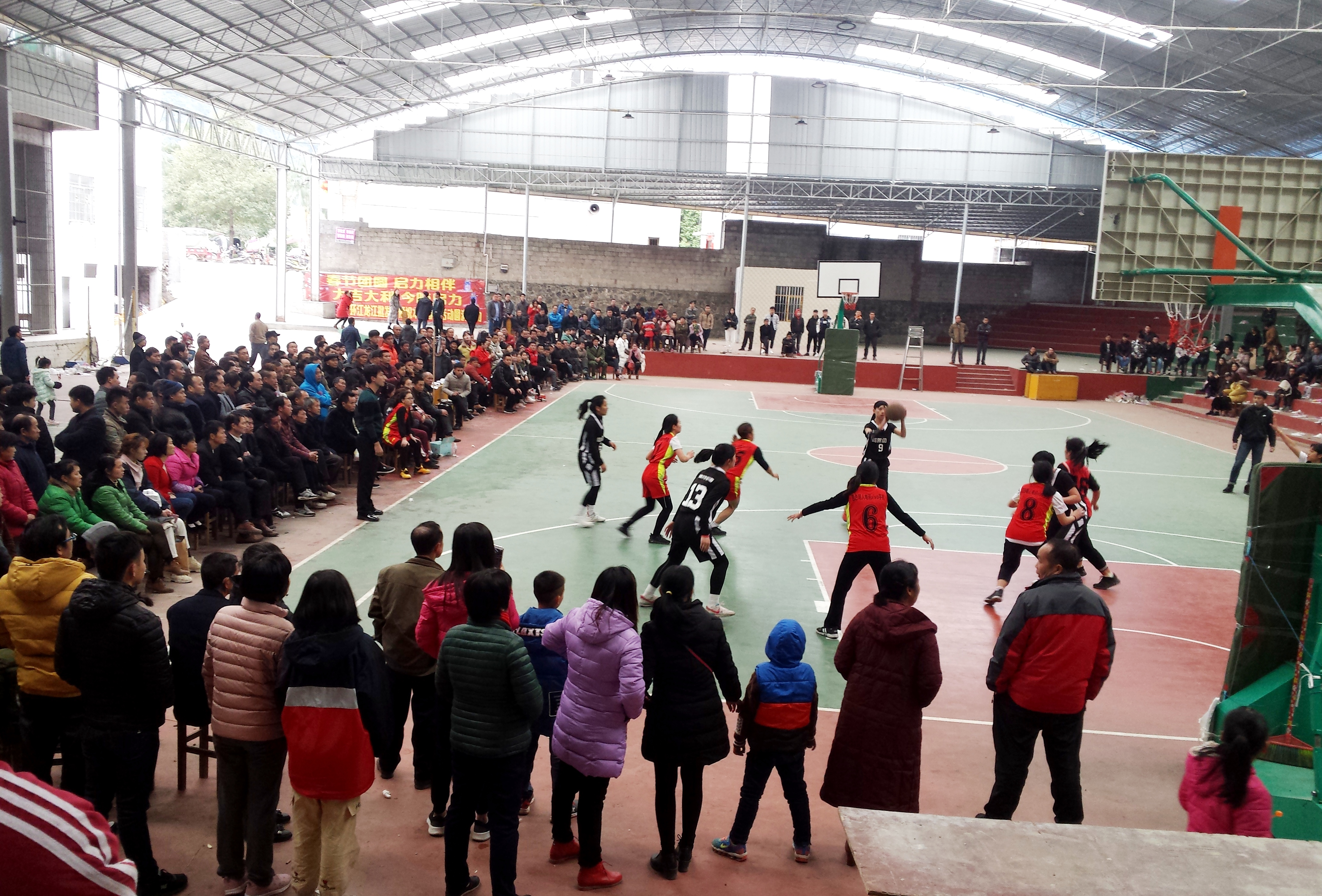
People from Dongxing at an all-female basketball match

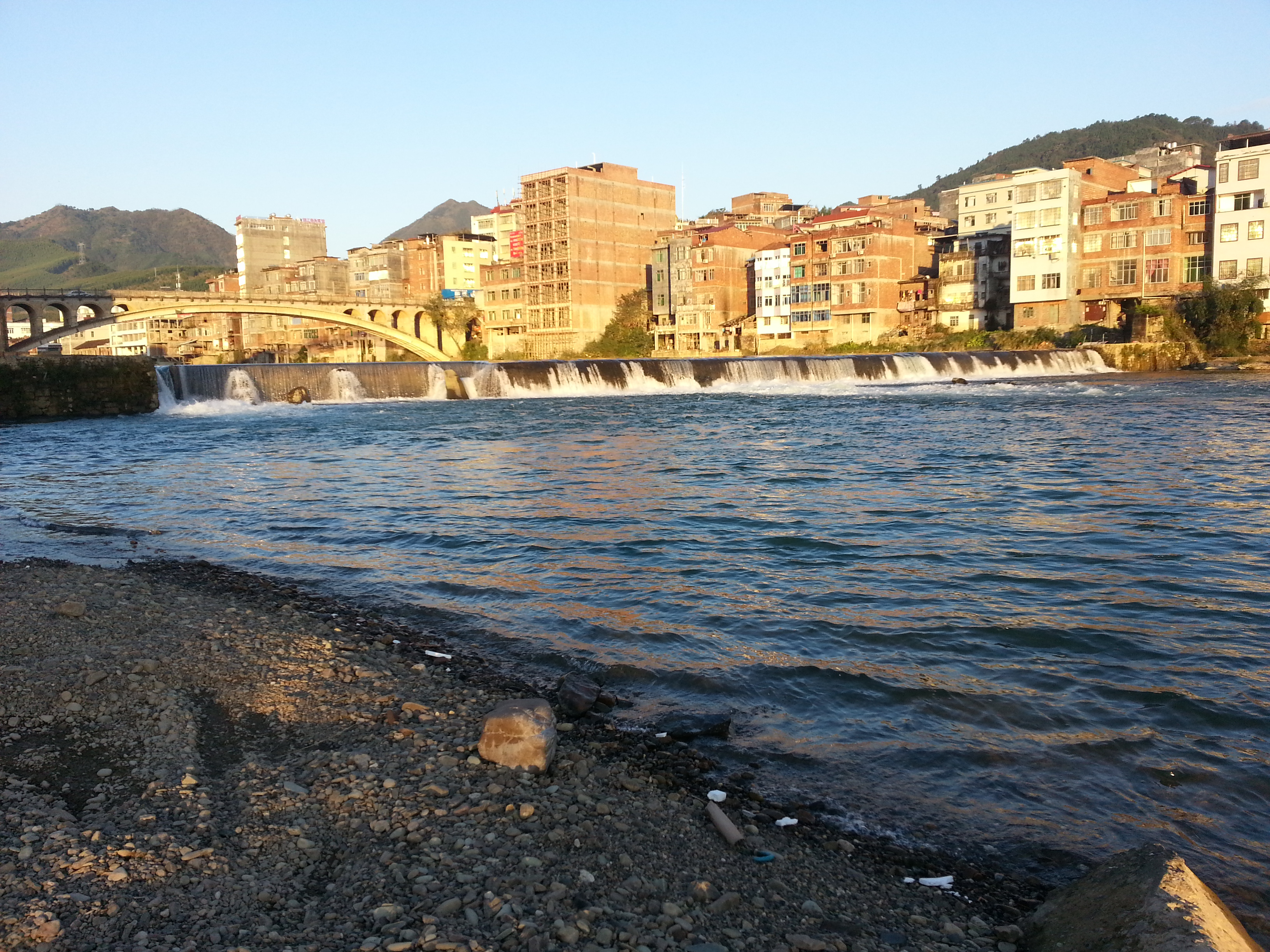
View from the river bank

== See also ==
- Hechi, Guangxi
- Huanjiang Maonan Autonomous County
