= Shuiyuan, Guangxi =

Shuiyuan 水源镇
- Town
- Location in Guangxi
- Coordinates: 24°54′33″N 108°07′52″E
- Country: People's Republic of China
- Autonomous region: Guangxi
- Prefecture-level city: Hechi
- Autonomous county: Huanjiang Maonan Autonomous County
- Incorporated (township): 1933
- Designated (town): 1996

Area
  - Total: 355.89 km^{2} (137.41 sq mi)

Population (2019)
  - Total: 42,255
  - Density: 118.73/km^{2} (307.51/sq mi)
- Time zone: UTC+08:00 (China Standard)
- Postal code: 547102
- Area code: 0778

Chinese name
- Simplified Chinese: 水源镇
- Traditional Chinese: 水源鎮
Transcriptions
Standard Mandarin
- Hanyu Pinyin: Shuǐyuán Zhèn

Shuiyuan (Chinese: 水源镇) is a town in Huanjiang Maonan Autonomous County, Guangxi, China. As of the 2019 census it had a population of 42,255 and an area of 355.89-square-kilometre (137.41 sq mi).

== Administrative division ==
As of 2021, the town is divided into two communities and eleven villages:

- Shuiyuan Community (水源社区)
- Shangnan Community (上南社区)
- Zhongjian (中涧村)
- Heping (和平村)
- Lila (里腊村)
- Xili (西里村)
- Sancai (三才村)
- Sanmei (三美村)
- Hanxiang (含香村)
- Wenping (温平村)
- Shandong (山洞村)
- Minquan (民权村)
- Gedan (各旦村)

== History ==
The area of modern-day Shuiyuan Town was part of the Longyuan County (龙源县) during the Tang dynasty (618–907). In 1075, in the ruling of Emperor Shenzong of Song dynasty (906–1279), Longyuan County was merged into Si'en County (思恩县).

In 1933 during the Republic of China, the area belonged to Shuiyuan Township (水源乡) and Shangnan Township (上南乡).

In 1958, Red Sun People's Commune (红日人民公社) was founded and one year later split into three communes, namely Sanmei People's Commune (三美人民公社), Longsheng People's Commune (隆胜人民公社), and Shuiyuan People's Commune (水源人民公社). In 1962, the three communes merged to form Shuiyuan District (水源区), which was renamed Shuiyuan People's Commune in 1965. In 1984, Shuiyuan People's Commune split into two townships: Shuiyuan Township and Shangnan Maonan Ethnic Township (上南毛南族乡; later renamed Shangnan Township in 1987). In 1996, it was upgraded to a town. In 2005, Shangnan Township was merged into Shuiyuan Town.

== Geography ==
The town is situated at the south of Huanjiang Maonan Autonomous County. It is surrounded by Luoyang Town and Xianan Township on the northwest and northeast, Si'en Town on the east, and Jinchengjiang District on the south.

=== Climate ===
The town enjoys a subtropical humid monsoon climate, characterized by four distinct seasons, sufficient sunlight, abundant rainfall and long frost free period. The average temperature is 18 °C (64 °F).

== Economy ==
The town's economy is based on nearby mineral resources and agricultural resources. The main crops of the region are rice, followed by corn and soybean. Sugarcane is one of the important economic crops in the region. The region also has an abundance of silicon.

== Demographics ==
Historical population
| Year | Pop. | ±% |
|---|---|---|
| 2011 | 41,837 | — |
| 2019 | 42,255 | +1.0% |

The 2019 census showed the town's population to be 42,255, an increase of 1.0% from the 2011 census.

== Transportation ==
The Provincial Highway S309 passes across the town north to south.
