= Chuanshan, Huanjiang County =

Chuanshan 川山镇
- Town
- Location in Guangxi
- Coordinates: 25°03′08″N 108°05′33″E
- Country: People's Republic of China
- Autonomous region: Guangxi
- Prefecture-level city: Hechi
- Autonomous county: Huanjiang Maonan Autonomous County
- Incorporated (township): 1933
- Designated (town): 1997

Area
  - Total: 664.40 km^{2} (256.53 sq mi)

Population (2019)
  - Total: 47,613
  - Density: 71.663/km^{2} (185.61/sq mi)
- Time zone: UTC+08:00 (China Standard)
- Postal code: 547104
- Area code: 0778

Chinese name
- Simplified Chinese: 川山镇
- Traditional Chinese: 川山鎮
Transcriptions
Standard Mandarin
- Hanyu Pinyin: Chuānshān Zhèn

Chuanshan (Chinese: 川山镇) is a town in Huanjiang Maonan Autonomous County, Guangxi, China. As of the 2019 census it had a population of 47,613 and an area of 664.40-square-kilometre (256.53 sq mi).

== Administrative division ==
As of 2021, the town is divided into two communities and eighteen villages:

- Youdong Community (由动社区)
- Mulun Community (木论社区)
- Linlang (琳琅村)
- Tongban (同伴村)
- Duchuan (都川村)
- Gubin (古宾村)
- Wuwei (五圩村)
- Xiarong (下荣村)
- Donggan (洞敢村)
- Dingji (顶吉村)
- Leyi (乐依村)
- Chajiang (茶江村)
- Tangwan (塘万村)
- Xiajiu (下久村)
- Dongshan (东山村)
- Xiagan (下干村)
- Xiafeng (下丰村)
- Baidan (白丹村)
- Shecun (社村村)
- Hedun (何顿村)

== History ==
During the Qing dynasty (1644–1911), it belonged to Si'en County (思恩县).

In 1933 during the Republic of China, Youdong Township (由峒乡) was founded.

In 1951, it was under the jurisdiction of the 3rd District. In 1955, Tongshan District (同山区) was set up. In 1958, it was renamed Chuanshan People's Commune (川山人民公社) and then Chuanshan District in 1962. It was incorporated as a township in 1984. In 1997, it was upgraded to a town. In 2005, Mulun Township (木论乡) was merged into the town.

== Geography ==
The town lies at the northwestern of Huanjiang Maonan Autonomous County, bordering Nandan County to the west, Xianan Township to the south, Libo County to the north, and Luoyang Town to the east.

The highest point in the town is Gaodong Mountain (高洞山) which stands 1,376 metres (4,514 ft) above sea level. The lowest point is the village of Xiajiu (下久村), which, at 321 metres (1,053 ft) above sea level.

There are four rivers in the town: Dagou River (打狗河), Shecun River (社村河), Duchuan River (都川河), and Gubin River (古宾河).

The town is in the subtropical monsoon climate zone, with an average annual temperature of 16.9 °C (62.4 °F), total annual rainfall of 1,389.1-millimetre (54.69 in), a frost-free period of 300 days and annual average sunshine hours in 146 hours.

== Economy ==
The economy is supported primarily by agriculture and mineral resources. Significant crops include rice and corn. Sugarcane is one of the important economic crops in the region. The region abounds with iron, lead, zinc and arsenopyrite.

== Demographics ==
Historical population
Year	Pop.	±%
2011	47,350	—
2019	47,613	+0.6%

The 2019 census reported the town had a population of 47,613.

== Transportation ==
The Provincial Highway S205 passes across the eastern town.

== Tourist attractions ==
Chuanshan Temple was a Buddhist temple in the town, originally built by a monk from Emei Mountain, and was completely destroyed by the Red Guards during the ten-year Cultural Revolution.
