= Huanjiang Maonan Autonomous County =

Huanjiang County 环江县 · Vanzgyangh Swciyen
- County
- 环江毛南族自治县; Vanzgyangh Mauznanzcuz Swciyen; Huanjiang Maonan Autonomous County
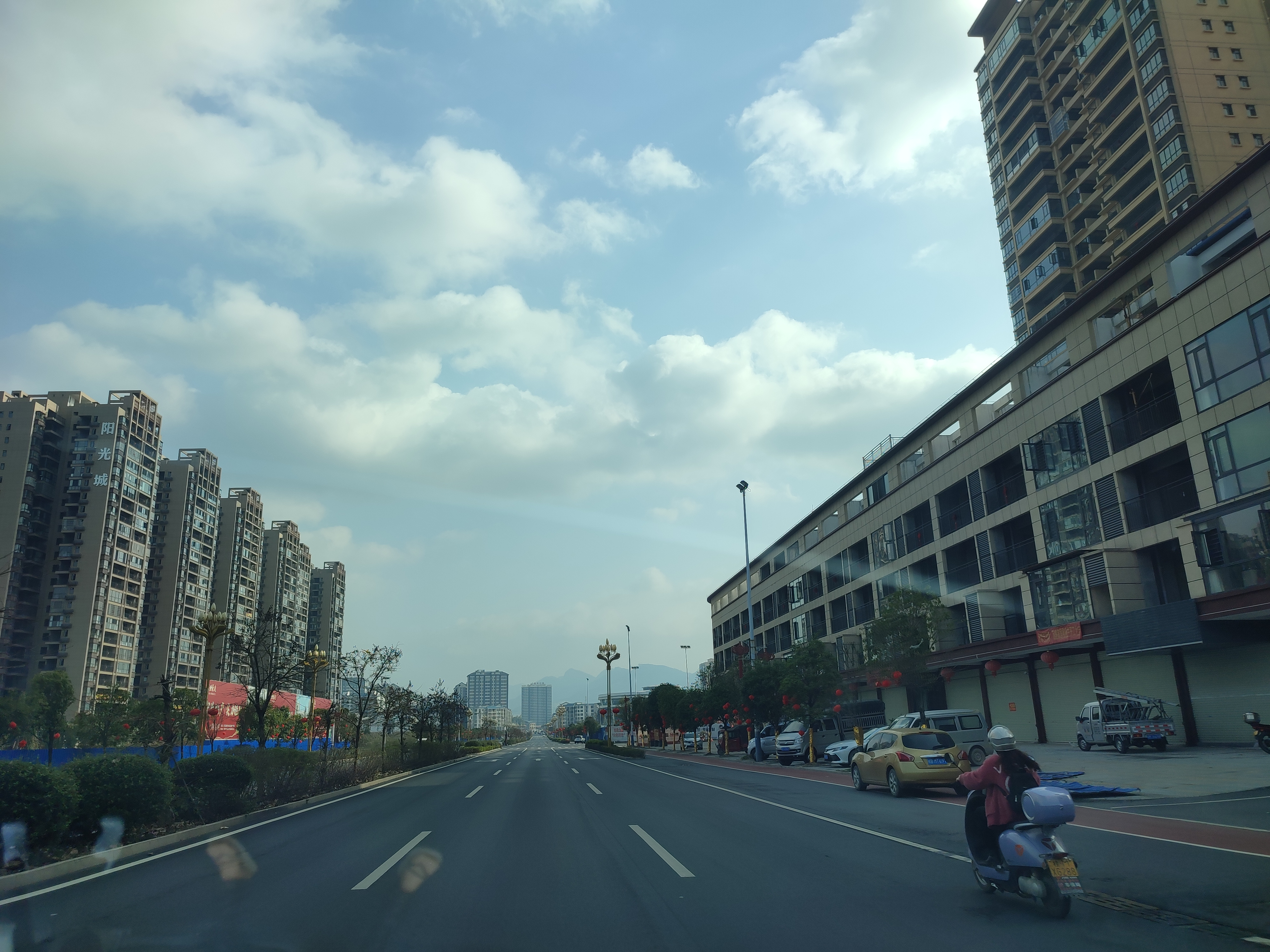
- Scenery of downtown Huanjiang City

- Location of the seat in Guangxi
- Coordinates: 24°50′N 108°15′E
- Country: China
- Autonomous region: Guangxi
- Prefecture-level city: Hechi
- County seat: Si'en

Area
  - Total: 4,558 km^{2} (1,760 sq mi)

Population (2020)
  - Total: 276,076
  - Density: 60.57/km^{2} (156.9/sq mi)
- Time zone: UTC+8 (China Standard)

Huanjiang Maonan Autonomous County (Zhuang: Vanzgyangh Mauznamzcuz Swci Yen; simplified Chinese: 环江毛南族自治县; traditional Chinese: 環江毛南族自治縣; pinyin: Huánjiāng máonánzú Zìzhìxiàn) is an ethnic Maonan autonomous county in the north of Guangxi, China, bordering Guizhou province to the north and northwest. It is under the administration of Hechi city. It is the only Maonan autonomous county in China.

== Administrative divisions ==
Huangjiang County is divided into 6 towns, 5 townships and 1 ethnic township:

Towns

- Si'en Town 思恩镇
- Shuiyuan Town 水源镇
- Luoyang Town 洛阳镇
- Chuanshan Town 川山镇
- Minglun Town 明伦镇
- Dongxing Town 东兴镇

Townships

- Dacai Township 大才乡
- Xianan Township 下南乡
- Da'an Township 大安乡
- Changmei Township 长美乡
- Longyan Township 龙岩乡

Ethnic township

- Xunle Miao Ethnic Township 驯乐苗族乡

== City ==
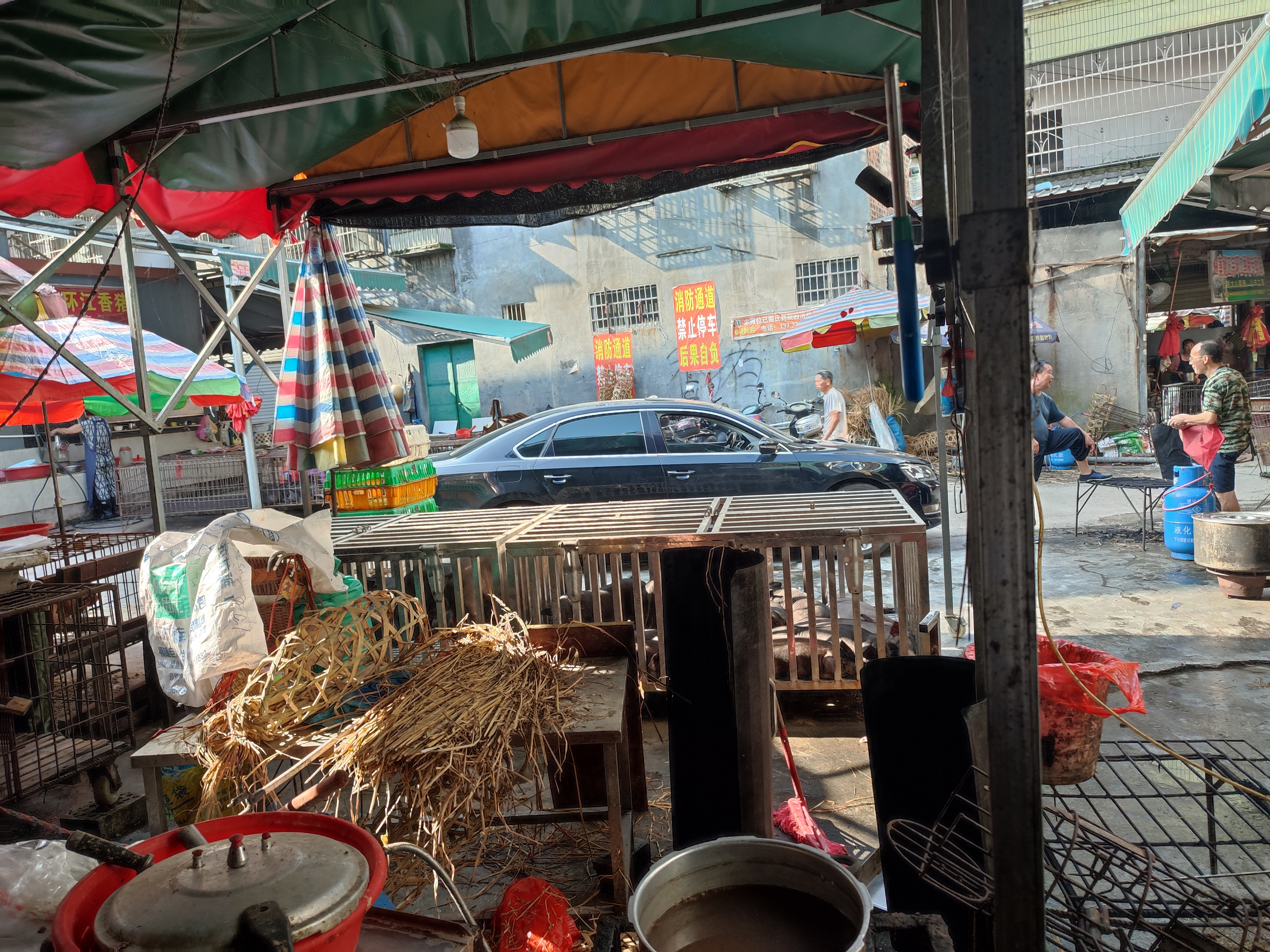
Scene of a Wet Market in Huanjiang

The city of Huanjiang is the county seat and a county-level city. It's located 30km away from Hechi City. In 2020, Xi Jinping gave instruction to the Maonan people of Huanjiang to work hard and alleviate poverty. This in turn brought more investment into the city for development and a High Speed Rail was constructed and inaugurated in 2022 which connects the 2 cities to Nanning and Guizhou. Other modes of inter-city transportation are via coach, Passenger trains or private taxi.

== Culture ==
Although designated as an ethnic city, the Maonan people still constitute the minority of the city as the other dominant groups are Han and Zhuang. In terms of cuisine, a speciality of the city is Maonan-style beef jerky (毛南香牛肉干) and other dishes found in restaurants are Pickled pork (酸肉) and a variety of other pickled vegetables.

== Tourism ==
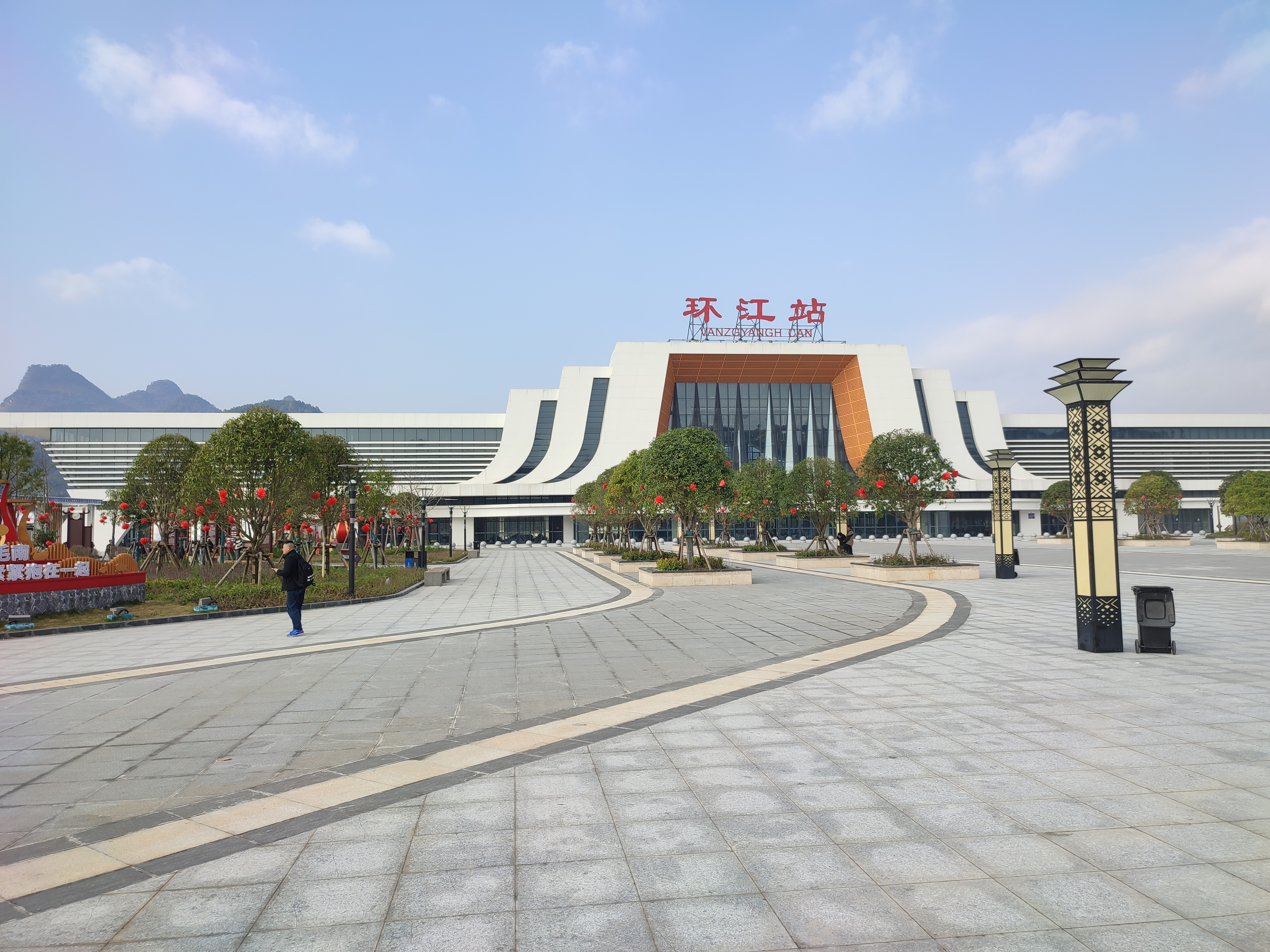
Huanjiang High-Speed Railway Station

One of the economical outputs of the county is its numerous scenic spots like waterfalls, caves and mountaineering through its vast range of karst mountains.

== Climate ==
Climate data for Huanjiang, elevation 209 m (686 ft), (1991–2020 normals, extremes 1981–present)
Month	Jan	Feb	Mar	Apr	May	Jun	Jul	Aug	Sep	Oct	Nov	Dec	Year
Record high °C (°F)	27.7 (81.9)	31.8 (89.2)	34.6 (94.3)	37.3 (99.1)	36.7 (98.1)	36.9 (98.4)	38.6 (101.5)	39.1 (102.4)	38.2 (100.8)	35.9 (96.6)	31.7 (89.1)	29.5 (85.1)	39.1 (102.4)
Mean daily maximum °C (°F)	13.8 (56.8)	16.8 (62.2)	19.9 (67.8)	25.4 (77.7)	29.1 (84.4)	31.1 (88.0)	32.7 (90.9)	33.1 (91.6)	31.2 (88.2)	27.0 (80.6)	22.7 (72.9)	17.3 (63.1)	25.0 (77.0)
Daily mean °C (°F)	10.0 (50.0)	12.9 (55.2)	16.0 (60.8)	21.2 (70.2)	24.7 (76.5)	26.9 (80.4)	28.2 (82.8)	27.9 (82.2)	25.7 (78.3)	21.6 (70.9)	17.0 (62.6)	12.2 (54.0)	20.4 (68.7)
Mean daily minimum °C (°F)	7.5 (45.5)	10.3 (50.5)	13.3 (55.9)	18.1 (64.6)	21.4 (70.5)	23.9 (75.0)	25.0 (77.0)	24.4 (75.9)	21.9 (71.4)	18.1 (64.6)	13.2 (55.8)	8.9 (48.0)	17.2 (62.9)
Record low °C (°F)	−1.8 (28.8)	−0.6 (30.9)	2.0 (35.6)	6.7 (44.1)	10.6 (51.1)	14.2 (57.6)	17.8 (64.0)	19.6 (67.3)	13.5 (56.3)	6.3 (43.3)	2.4 (36.3)	−2.7 (27.1)	−2.7 (27.1)
Average precipitation mm (inches)	44.5 (1.75)	41.6 (1.64)	66.7 (2.63)	105.1 (4.14)	221.4 (8.72)	299.2 (11.78)	221.3 (8.71)	155.5 (6.12)	76.0 (2.99)	71.6 (2.82)	40.2 (1.58)	36.2 (1.43)	1,379.3 (54.31)
Average precipitation days (≥ 0.1 mm)	12.9	12.1	15.8	15.8	15.8	17.4	17.0	13.7	7.9	8.0	8.5	8.5	153.4
Average snowy days	0.4	0.2	0	0	0	0	0	0	0	0	0	0.2	0.8
Average relative humidity (%)	77	76	77	77	77	80	78	78	76	76	75	75	77
Mean monthly sunshine hours	45.1	50.5	58.4	82.7	113.8	103.3	159.7	176.2	156.5	127.8	117.1	91.1	1,282.2
Percentage possible sunshine	14	16	16	22	27	25	38	44	43	36	36	28	29
Source: China Meteorological AdministrationAll-time April high
