= Fenghuang Township, Bama Yao Autonomous County =

Fenghuang Township 凤凰乡
- Township
- Location in Guangxi
- Coordinates: 24°12′21″N 107°25′08″E
- Country: China
- Autonomous Region: Guangxi
- Prefecture-level city: Hechi
- Autonomous county: Bama Yao Autonomous County

Area
  - Total: 87 km^{2} (34 sq mi)

Population (2018)
  - Total: 12,000
  - Density: 140/km^{2} (360/sq mi)
- Time zone: UTC+08:00 (China Standard)
- Postal code: 547511
- Area code: 0778

Fenghuang Township (simplified Chinese: 凤凰乡; traditional Chinese: 鳳凰鄉; pinyin: Fènghuáng Xiāng; lit. 'Phoenix Township') is a township in Bama Yao Autonomous County, Guangxi, China. As of the 2018 census it had a population of 12,000 and an area of 87 square kilometres (34 sq mi).

== Etymology ==
The township is named "Fenghuang" (Phoenix) because there is a mountain in the township which looks like a phoenix.

== Administrative division ==
As of 2016, the township is divided into four villages:

- Changhe (长和村)
- Dena (德纳村)
- Fenghuang (凤凰村)
- Nazhao (那朝村)

== Geography ==
The township is situated at the eastern Bama Yao Autonomous County. It is bordered to the north by Donglan County, to the east by Dongshan Township and Dahua Yao Autonomous County, to the south by Dahua Yao Autonomous County, and to the west by Bama Town.

== Economy ==
The region's economy is based on agriculture. The main crops of the region are grains, followed by sugarcane and beans. The Bama miniature pig (巴马香猪) is a local specialty pig.

== Transportation ==
The China National Highway 323 passes across the township southwest to north.
