= Natao Township =

Natao Township 那桃乡
- Township
- Location in Guangxi
- Coordinates: 24°01′09″N 107°20′33″E
- Country: People's Republic of China
- Autonomous region: Guangxi
- Prefecture-level city: Hechi
- Autonomous county: Bama Yao Autonomous County

Area
  - Total: 210 km^{2} (81 sq mi)

Population (2005)
  - Total: 30,371
  - Density: 140/km^{2} (370/sq mi)
- Time zone: UTC+08:00 (China Standard)
- Postal code: 547502
- Area code: 0778

Natao Township (simplified Chinese: 那桃乡; traditional Chinese: 那桃鄉; pinyin: Nàtáo Xiāng) is a rural township in Bama Yao Autonomous County, Guangxi Zhuang Autonomous Region, China. As of the 2005 census it had a population of 30,371 and an area of 210 square kilometres (81 sq mi).

== Administrative division ==
As of 2017, the township is divided into eight villages:

- Natao (那桃村)
- Namin (那敏村)
- Lanting (兰廷村)
- Lide (立德村)
- Poliang (坡良村)
- Min'an (民安村)
- Banjiao (班交村)
- Pinglin (平林村)

== Geography ==
The township is bordered to the north by Bama Town, to the east by Dahua Yao Autonomous County, to the southeast by Bailin Township, to the southwest by Tiandong County, and to the west by Yandong Township.

The Lingqi River (灵岐河) flows through the town west to east. The Laiqing River (赖清河) flows through the town north to south.

== Demographics ==
Historical population
Year	Pop.	±%
2000	25,917	—
2005	30,371	+17.2%

The population of Bama, according to the 2018 census, is 30,371.

== Economy ==
The town's economy is based on nearby mineral resources and agricultural resources. Medicinal materials, bamboo shoots, ginger, anise, tea oil, bananas, Bama miniature pig (巴马香猪) and ducks are well-known local products.

The region abounds with titanium, silicon, copper, iron, manganese, gold, talc and mineral water.

== Transport ==
The Provincial Highway S208 passes across the township.
