= Nashe Township =

Nashe Township 那社乡
- Township
- Location in Guangxi
- Coordinates: 24°16′47″N 107°00′59″E
- Country: China
- Autonomous Region: Guangxi
- Prefecture-level city: Hechi
- Autonomous county: Bama Yao Autonomous County

Area
  - Total: 173 km^{2} (67 sq mi)

Population (2018)
  - Total: 17,000
  - Density: 98/km^{2} (250/sq mi)
- Time zone: UTC+08:00 (China Standard)
- Postal code: 547514
- Area code: 0778

Nashe Township (simplified Chinese: 那社乡; traditional Chinese: 那社鄉; pinyin: Nàshè Xiāng) is a township in Bama Yao Autonomous County, Guangxi, China. As of the 2018 census it had a population of 17,000 and an area of 173 square kilometres (67 sq mi).

== Administrative division ==
As of 2016, the township is divided into seven villages:

- Donglie (东烈村)
- Daluo (大洛村)
- Nashe (那社村)
- Gong'ai (公爱村)
- Nayi (那乙村)
- Naqin (那勤村)
- Xianglan (祥兰村)

== Geography ==
The township is located in western Bama Yao Autonomous County. It borders Fengshan County in the north, Jiazhuan Town in the east, Suolue Township in the southwest.

== Economy ==
The economy is supported primarily by agriculture, forestry and mineral resources. The main crops of the region are grains, followed by corns and cassava. Camellia oleifera is the economic plant of this region. The region abounds with gold, copper, iron, manganese and coal.

== Tourist attractions ==
The Crystal Palace of the Dragon King (水晶宫) is a karst cave and famous scenic spot in the county.
