= Xishan Township, Bama County =

Xishan Township 西山乡
- Township
- Location in Guangxi
- Coordinates: 24°14′01″N 107°11′22″E
- Country: People's Republic of China
- Autonomous Region: Guangxi
- Prefecture-level city: Hechi
- Autonomous county: Bama Yao Autonomous County

Area
  - Total: 253.6 km^{2} (97.9 sq mi)

Population (2018)
  - Total: 23,000
  - Density: 91/km^{2} (230/sq mi)
- Time zone: UTC+08:00 (China Standard)
- Postal code: 547509
- Area code: 0778

Xishan Township (simplified Chinese: 西山乡; traditional Chinese: 西山鄉; pinyin: Xīshān Xiāng) is a township in Bama Yao Autonomous County, Guangxi, China. As of the 2018 census it had a population of 23,000 and an area of 253.6 square kilometres (97.9 sq mi).

== Administrative division ==
As of 2016, the township is divided into sixteen villages:

- Fuhou (福厚村)
- Hele (合乐村)
- Bana (巴纳村)
- Nongyou (弄友村)
- Jia'er (加而村)
- Gancahng (干长村)
- Lalin (拉林村)
- Nongjing (弄京村)
- Linlan (林览村)
- Kacai (卡才村)
- Nongfeng (弄峰村)
- Nonglie (弄烈村)
- Nonglin (弄林村)
- Polin (坡林村)
- Qinlan (勤兰村)
- Gexian (戈贤村)

== Geography ==
The township lies at the northern of Bama Yao Autonomous County, bordering Jiazhuan Town to the west, Bama Town to the south, Fengshan County to the north, and Donglan County to the east.

== Economy ==
The region's economy is based on agriculture. Significant crops include grains and beans. The Bama miniature pig (巴马香猪) is a local specialty pig. The region also has an abundance of marble and iron.

== Tourist attractions ==
Some sites of the Red Army are main attractions in the township.

== Transportation ==
The G78 Shantou–Kunming Expressway passes across the township northeast to southwest.
