= Jiazhuan =

Jiazhuan 甲篆镇
- Town
- Location in Guangxi
- Coordinates: 24°12′48″N 107°07′12″E
- Country: China
- Autonomous Region: Guangxi
- Prefecture-level city: Hechi
- Autonomous county: Bama Yao Autonomous County

Area
  - Total: 152 km^{2} (59 sq mi)

Population (2018)
  - Total: 32,000
  - Density: 210/km^{2} (550/sq mi)
- Time zone: UTC+08:00 (China Standard)
- Postal code: 547508
- Area code: 0778

Jiazhuan (simplified Chinese: 甲篆镇; traditional Chinese: 甲篆鎮; pinyin: Jiǎzhuàn Zhèn) is a town in Bama Yao Autonomous County, Guangxi, China. As of the 2018 census it had a population of 32,000 and an area of 152 square kilometres (59 sq mi).

== Administrative division ==
As of 2016, the town is divided into eleven villages:

- Baima (百马村)
- Lagao (拉高村)
- Jiazhuan (甲篆村)
- Namen (那门村)
- Songji (松吉村)
- Ping'an (平安村)
- Poyue (坡月村)
- Minshan (民山村)
- Renxiang (仁乡村)
- Xingren (兴仁村)
- Haohe (好合村)

== Geography ==
The town lies at the northwestern of Bama Yao Autonomous County, bordering Nashe Township to the west, Bama Town to the south, Fengshan County to the north, and Xishan Township to the east.

The Panyang River flows through the town northwest to southeast.

== Economy ==
The region's economy is based on agriculture and tourism. Significant crops include grains, beans, and cassava.

== Tourist attractions ==
The main attractions are the Baimo Cave (百魔洞; 'Hundred Devils Cave') and Bainiao Rock (百鸟岩; 'Hundred Birds Rock').

== Transportation ==
The Provincial Highway S208 passes across the town northwest to southeast.
