= Dongshan Township =

Dongshan Township (simplified Chinese: 东山乡; traditional Chinese: 東山鄉; pinyin: Dōngshān Xiāng or simplified Chinese: 冬山乡; traditional Chinese: 冬山鄉; pinyin: Dōngshān Xiāng), may refer to:

- Dongshan Township, Bama Yao Autonomous County, a township in Bama Yao Autonomous County, Guangxi Zhuang Autonomous Region, China
- Dongshan Township, Quanzhou County, a township in Quanzhou County, Guangxi Zhuang Autonomous Region, China
- Dongshan Dong Ethnic Township, Suining County, an ethnic township in Suining County, Hunan, China.
- Dongshan Township, Puge County, a township in Puge County, Sichuan, China.
- Dongshan Township, Tongjiang County, a township in Tongjiang County, Sichuan, China.
- Dongshan Township, Shanxi, a township in Fanzhi County, Shanxi, China.
- Dongshan Township, Qinghai, a township in Huzhu Tu Autonomous County, Qinghai, China.
- Dongshan Township, Inner Mongolia, a township in Songshan District of Chifeng, Inner Mongolia, China.
- Dongshan Township, Wenshan, a township in Wenshan City, Wenshan Zhuang and Miao Autonomous Prefecture, Yunan, China.
- Dongshan Township, Xiangyun County, a township in Xiangyun County, Dali Bai Autonomous Prefecture, Yunnan, China.
- Dongshan, Yilan, a township in Yilan County, Taiwan.
