= Baimo Cave =

Cave in Guangxi

- Hundred Devils Cave
- Location: Bama, Guangxi

The Baimo Cave (Chinese: 百魔洞), literally meaning 'Hundred Devils Cave', is a natural limestone cave located in Poyue Village, Jiazhuan Township, Bama County, Hechi City, Guangxi Province, China. It is also a popular attraction for elderly visitors to Bama County. The word "Baimao" means "spring mouth" in Zhuang.

The average height of the Baimo Cave is 70 meters and the width is 50 meters. The highest stalagmite in the cave is 39 meters and 10 meters in diameter.
