= Bailin Township =

Bailin Township 百林乡
- Township
- Location in Guangxi
- Coordinates: 23°54′31″N 107°24′27″E
- Country: China
- Autonomous Region: Guangxi
- Prefecture-level city: Hechi
- Autonomous county: Bama Yao Autonomous County

Area
  - Total: 114.43 km^{2} (44.18 sq mi)

Population (2018)
  - Total: 18,000
  - Density: 160/km^{2} (410/sq mi)
- Time zone: UTC+08:00 (China Standard)
- Postal code: 547501
- Area code: 0778

Bailin Township (simplified Chinese: 百林乡; traditional Chinese: 百林鄉; pinyin: Bǎilín Xiāng) is a township in Bama Yao Autonomous County, Guangxi, China. As of the 2018 census it had a population of 18,000 and an area of 114.43 square kilometres (44.18 sq mi).

== Administrative division ==
As of 2016, the township is divided into five villages:

- Yangchun (阳春村)
- Nanong (那弄村)
- Namo (那莫村)
- Luopi (罗皮村)
- Pingtian (平田村)

== Geography ==
The township is situated at southeastern Bama Yao Autonomous County. It borders Dahua Yao Autonomous County in the east, Pingguo in the south, and Tiandong County in the west.

The Lingqi River winds through the township.

== Economy ==
The township's economy is based on nearby mineral resources and agricultural resources. Significant crops include grain, corn, soybean, Castanea mollissima, peanut, fruit, and sugarcane. Recently, silkworm breeding has significantly developed in the township. The region also has an abundance of gold, titanium, manganese and silicon.

== Transportation ==
The Provincial Highway S208 passes across the township.
