= Suolue Township =

Suolue Township 所略乡
- Township
- Location in Guangxi
- Coordinates: 24°05′40″N 107°00′47″E
- Country: People's Republic of China
- Autonomous region: Guangxi
- Prefecture-level city: Hechi
- Autonomous county: Bama Yao Autonomous County

Area
  - Total: 344 km^{2} (133 sq mi)

Population (2005)
  - Total: 35,033
  - Density: 102/km^{2} (264/sq mi)
- Time zone: UTC+08:00 (China Standard)
- Postal code: 547503
- Area code: 0778

Suolue Township (simplified Chinese: 所略乡; traditional Chinese: 所略鄉; pinyin: Suǒluè Xiāng) is a rural township in Bama Yao Autonomous County, Guangxi Zhuang Autonomous Region, China. As of the 2005 census it had a population of 35,033 and an area of 344 square kilometres (133 sq mi).

== Administrative division ==
As of 2017, the township is divided into eighteen villages:

- Suoxu (所圩村)
- Pobang (坡帮村)
- Liaoxiang (料乡村)
- Jialue (甲略村)
- Powan (坡晚村)
- Fuxiang (福乡村)
- Pingliu (平六村)
- Liuneng (六能村)
- Longfeng (龙凤村)
- Shangqin (尚勤村)
- Nongzhong (弄中村)
- Baijiu (百久村)
- Nongyang (弄阳村)
- Nongshen (弄神村)
- Jusang (局桑村)
- Caixiang (彩乡村)
- Lina (力那村)
- Liangyin (朗因村)

== Geography ==
The township sits in the west of Bama Yao Autonomous County. It is surrounded by Nashe Township on the northwest, Jiazhuan Town on the northeast, Baise on the west, Yandong Township on the east, and Tianyang County on the south.

The highest point in the township is Mount Gaobiao (Chinese: 高镖山) which stands 1,147 metres (3,763 ft) above sea level. The second highest point in thetownship is Mount Yunpan (Chinese: 云盘山) which stands 1,006 metres (3,301 ft) above sea level.

The Baidong River (百东河) flows through the western town north to east.

The Fuxiang Reservoir (福乡水库) has a storage capacity of some 161.6 m^{3} (5,710 cu ft) of water.

== Demographics ==
The population of Bama, according to the 2005 census, is 35,033. Here live the Han, Zhuang and Yao nationalities.

== Economy ==
The main industries in and around the town are forestry and farming. The main food crops are rice, corn and cassava. Native products include tea-oil tree, goat, and Bama miniature pig (巴马香猪).

== Transport ==
The G78 Shantou-Kunming Expressway passes across the town.
