= Sanmenhai =

Cave in Guangxi, China

Sanmenhai is a cave in the Leye-Fengshan geopark in Guangxi, China. The cave is unique in that it features seven skylights that mimic the layout of the constellation Ursa Major (the Big Dipper).

== Etymology ==
Sanmenhai translates into English as three doors accessible to the sea. The cave is also known as Shuiyuandong, meaning cave that produces water.

== Location and geology ==
Sanmenhai is located in Poxin, a village in Fengshan County, Guangxi. It is an outlet of the Poxin underground river, which formed during the Permian period.

== Exploration ==
The seven skylights of the cave are designated Skylight I - Skylight VII. Skylights I - IV extend westward from the entrance of the cave. Sanmenhai is delimited by Skylight III, which divides the 2.4 kilometres (1.5 mi) underground river into southeast and northwest sections. The southeast portion is accessible by tourists, and extends 0.7 kilometres (0.43 mi) from the outlet to Skylight III.

Only three of the seven skylights are accessible by boat on the underground river: Skylights I, II, and III. Skylights IV and V are accessible by diving through the river a distance of 50 metres (160 ft) and 70 metres (230 ft), respectively.

The Poxin underground river undergoes daily tidal fluctuations, rising by 20 centimetres (7.9 in) at night.

Sanmenhai is a typical karst landform. In an area of less than 1 square kilometre (250 acres), in encompasses peaks, sinkholes, natural bridges, and karst lakes. skylight in sanmenhai is also called karst window(tiankeng) by Chinese, it is sinkhole-like formation, but differ from sinkhole

=== Skylight I ===
Skylight I is the biggest among the seven skylights. It is roughly circular in shape, with walls that are covered in vegetation. The diameter of the opening is 107 metres (351 ft) in the east–west direction and 98 metres (322 ft) in the north–south direction, with a depth of 72 metres (236 ft). There are four routes to Skylight I: the upper and lower reaches of the Poxin River; Gandong cave in east and south; and a water cave from underground. In 2009, a diving exploration found that there is no cave channel in underground.

=== Skylight II ===
Skylight II is an oval measuring 85 by 60 metres (279 ft × 197 ft). The bottom of the skylight is half-covered by water, at a depth of 19 metres (62 ft) below the rim. Some plants grow horizontally on the wall of Skylight II.

=== Skylight III ===
Skylight III is 690 m from the outlet. It is funnel-shaped, with a top diameter of 75 metres (246 ft), and a diameter at the water level of 43 metres (141 ft). The water depth is as much as 22 metres (72 ft) with an extra 10 metres (33 ft) of sediment. In 2008, explorers found that there was an underwater cave connecting Skylight III with Skylight IV.

=== Skylight IV ===
Skylight IV is also funnel-shaped, with top dimensions of 30 by 20 metres (98 ft × 66 ft) and water as deep as 70 metres (230 ft). The total height of this skylight (including the depth of the water) is 118 metres (387 ft).

== Gallery ==
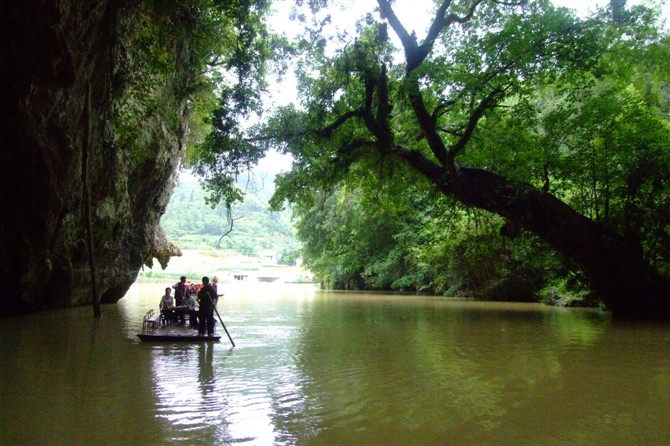
Outlet of Poxin river

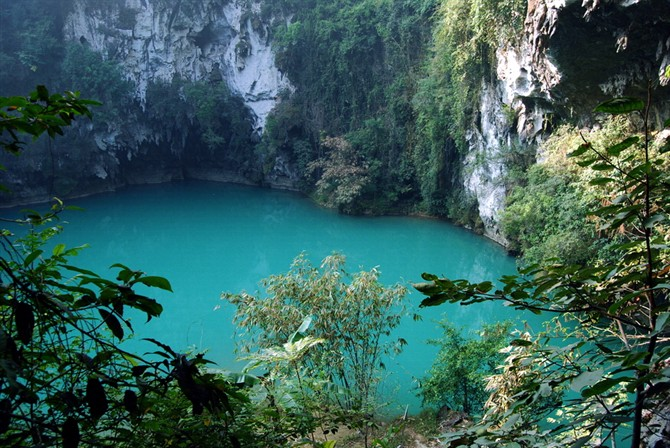
Skylight I

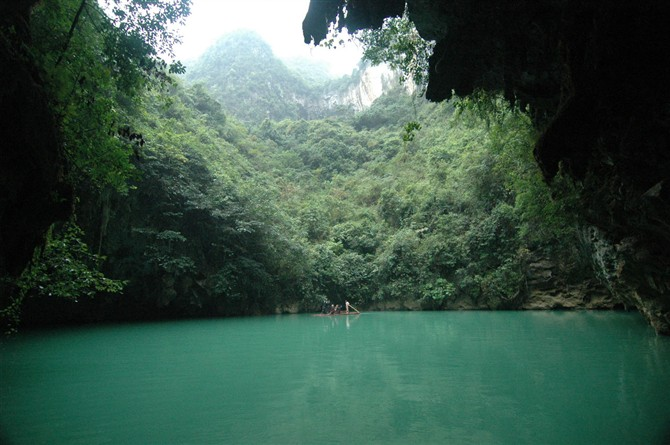
Skylight II

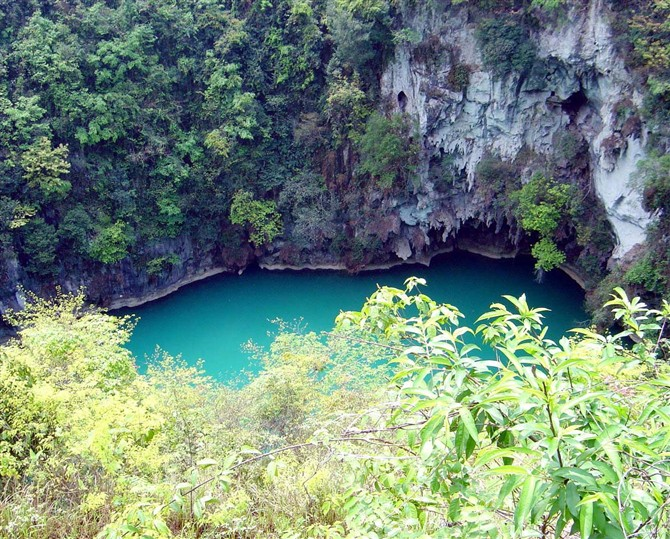
Skylight III
