= Yandong =

Yandong Township 燕洞镇
- Township
- Location in Guangxi
- Coordinates: 24°01′52″N 107°10′23″E
- Country: People's Republic of China
- Autonomous region: Guangxi
- Prefecture-level city: Hechi
- Autonomous county: Bama Yao Autonomous County

Area
  - Total: 226 km^{2} (87 sq mi)

Population (2005)
  - Total: 25,917
  - Density: 115/km^{2} (297/sq mi)
- Time zone: UTC+08:00 (China Standard)
- Postal code: 547505
- Area code: 0778

Yandong (simplified Chinese: 燕洞镇; traditional Chinese: 燕洞鎮; pinyin: Yàndòng Zhèn) is a town in Bama Yao Autonomous County, Guangxi Zhuang Autonomous Region, China. As of the 2015 census it had a population of 25,917 and an area of 226 square kilometres (87 sq mi).

== Administrative division ==
As of 2017, the town is divided into twelve villages:

- Longjia (龙甲村)
- Jiaole (交乐村)
- Longfeng (龙凤村)
- Longtian (龙田村)
- Tonghe (同合村)
- Laiman (赖满村)
- Yandong (燕洞村)
- Longwei (龙威村)
- Xinli (新力村)
- Hongwan (洪晚村)
- Zimao (子帽村)
- Yanting (岩廷村)

== History ==
In March 2016 it was upgraded to a town.

== Geography ==
The town lies in the southern Bama Yao Autonomous County at its border with the counties of Tiandong and Tianyang. It borders the towns of Jiazhuan and Bama in the north, Natao Township in the east, Tianyang County in the southwest, Tiandong County in the southeast, and Suolue Township in the west.

The Lingxi Stream (灵犀河) and Chedou Stream (车斗河) flow through the town.

== Economy ==
The town's economy is based on nearby mineral resources and agricultural resources. The region abounds with gold, copper and antimony. The main food crops are rice, corn and cassava. Native products include tea-oil tree and Bama miniature pig (巴马香猪).

== Transport ==
The National Highway G323 passes across the township.
