= Dongshan Township, Bama Yao Autonomous County =

Dongshan Township 东山乡
- Township
- Location in Guangxi
- Coordinates: 24°13′45″N 107°32′17″E
- Country: People's Republic of China
- Autonomous region: Guangxi
- Prefecture-level city: Hechi
- Autonomous county: Bama Yao Autonomous County

Area
  - Total: 115 km^{2} (44 sq mi)

Population (2005)
  - Total: 10,890
  - Density: 94.7/km^{2} (245/sq mi)
- Time zone: UTC+08:00 (China Standard)
- Postal code: 547512
- Area code: 0778

Dongshan Township (simplified Chinese: 东山乡; traditional Chinese: 東山鄉; pinyin: Dōngshān Xiāng) is a rural township in Bama Yao Autonomous County, Guangxi Zhuang Autonomous Region, China. As of the 2005 census it had a population of 10,890 and an area of 115 square kilometres (44 sq mi).

== Etymology ==
The name "Dongshan" means the east side of the Duyang Mountains (都阳山脉).

== Administrative division ==
As of 2017, the township is divided into 8 villages:

- Kaqiao (卡桥村)
- Jiangtuan (江团村)
- Youya (优雅村)
- Nongmo (弄谟村)
- Sanlian (三联村)
- Wenqian (文钱村)
- Nongshan (弄山村)
- Changdong (长垌村)

== Geography ==
The township shares a border with Donglan County to the north and northwest, Banlan Township of Dahua Yao Autonomous County to the southeast, Town to the north, and Fenghuang Township to the southwest.

== Demographics ==
Historical population
Year	Pop.	±%
2000	11,003	—
2005	10,890	−1.0%

The population of Bama, according to the 2005 census, is 10,890. There are Zhuang, Han, Yao and Maonan nationalities living here.

== Economy ==
The main industries in and around the township are forestry and farming. The main food crops are corn, soybean and sweet potato, and the main cash crops are hemp. Breeders are mainly black goats, pigeons, black-bone chickens and Bama miniature pig (巴马香猪). Native products include shar-pei, hook rattan, honeysuckle, ivy and so on.
