= Bama Yao Autonomous County =

Bama County 巴马县 · Bahmaj Yen
- County
- 巴马瑶族自治县; Bahmaj Yauzcuz Swciyen; Bama Yao Autonomous County
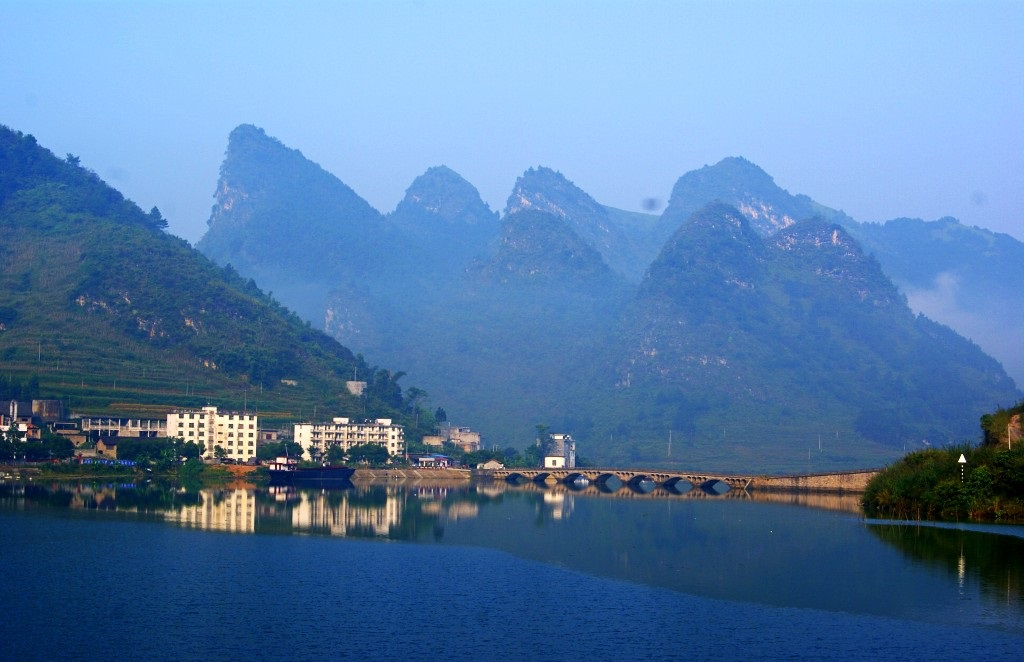

- Location of the seat in Guangxi
- Coordinates: 24°08′31″N 107°15′32″E
- Country: China
- Autonomous region: Guangxi
- Prefecture-level city: Hechi
- County seat: Bama Town

Area
  - Total: 1,966 km^{2} (759 sq mi)
- Elevation: 230 m (750 ft)

Population (2020)
  - Total: 236,152
  - Density: 120.1/km^{2} (311.1/sq mi)
- Time zone: UTC+8 (China Standard)

Bama Yao Autonomous County (Zhuang: Bahmax Yauzcuz Swci Yen,simplified Chinese: 巴马瑶族自治县; traditional Chinese: 巴馬瑤族自治縣; pinyin: Bāmǎ Yáozú Zìzhìxiàn) is a county in Guangxi, China. It is under the administration of Hechi City. The residents of Bama County have a reputation for longevity, and Bama has been the focus of studies from geriatricians nationwide.

== History ==
In 1929, Bama County was part of a short-lived soviet led by Deng Xiaoping.

The county is famous for its large number of centenarians. Longevity in Bama County has been associated with cleanliness of the air and water, simplicity of life, and the lack of meat in the typical diet.

Bama County, like the province it is a part of, is a historically poor county. It is now becoming a major destination for health tourism within China, resulting in increasing economic opportunities.

== Administrative divisions ==
There are 3 towns and 7 townships in the county:

Towns

Bama (巴马镇), Jiazhuan (甲篆镇), Yandong (燕洞镇)

Townships

Nashe Township (那社乡), Suolue Township (所略乡), Xishan Township (西山乡), Dongshan Township (东山乡), Fenghuang Township (凤凰乡), Bailin Township (百林乡), Natao Township (那桃乡)

== Demographics ==
The Yao people of Bama County consist of the following three subgroups.

- Bunu (布努): in Dongshan (东山乡)
- Nuomang (诺芒): in Suolüe (所略乡) and Yandong (燕洞乡)
- Nuonuo (诺诺): in remaining townships

== Climate ==
Climate data for Bama, elevation 255 m (837 ft), (1991–2020 normals, extremes 1981–2010)
Month	Jan	Feb	Mar	Apr	May	Jun	Jul	Aug	Sep	Oct	Nov	Dec	Year
Record high °C (°F)	29.8 (85.6)	34.8 (94.6)	36.6 (97.9)	39.2 (102.6)	38.1 (100.6)	37.2 (99.0)	38.2 (100.8)	39.0 (102.2)	38.9 (102.0)	34.9 (94.8)	32.3 (90.1)	30.8 (87.4)	39.2 (102.6)
Mean daily maximum °C (°F)	16.3 (61.3)	18.9 (66.0)	22.2 (72.0)	27.2 (81.0)	30.2 (86.4)	31.7 (89.1)	32.6 (90.7)	33.0 (91.4)	31.3 (88.3)	27.6 (81.7)	23.6 (74.5)	18.8 (65.8)	26.1 (79.0)
Daily mean °C (°F)	12.0 (53.6)	14.3 (57.7)	17.5 (63.5)	22.1 (71.8)	25.0 (77.0)	26.8 (80.2)	27.3 (81.1)	27.0 (80.6)	25.1 (77.2)	21.6 (70.9)	17.5 (63.5)	13.1 (55.6)	20.8 (69.4)
Mean daily minimum °C (°F)	9.2 (48.6)	11.2 (52.2)	14.4 (57.9)	18.6 (65.5)	21.5 (70.7)	23.6 (74.5)	24.1 (75.4)	23.6 (74.5)	21.5 (70.7)	18.1 (64.6)	13.9 (57.0)	9.7 (49.5)	17.5 (63.4)
Record low °C (°F)	−1.6 (29.1)	0.3 (32.5)	2.0 (35.6)	8.2 (46.8)	10.8 (51.4)	14.5 (58.1)	17.7 (63.9)	19.5 (67.1)	12.9 (55.2)	6.8 (44.2)	1.5 (34.7)	−2.3 (27.9)	−2.3 (27.9)
Average precipitation mm (inches)	34.7 (1.37)	27.7 (1.09)	50.9 (2.00)	88.2 (3.47)	222.2 (8.75)	351.6 (13.84)	284.0 (11.18)	209.7 (8.26)	120.1 (4.73)	88.5 (3.48)	48.7 (1.92)	29.7 (1.17)	1,556 (61.26)
Average precipitation days (≥ 0.1 mm)	10.6	9.5	12.3	13.2	15.3	18.4	18.5	16.0	10.2	9.2	8.2	7.3	148.7
Average snowy days	0.1	0	0	0	0	0	0	0	0	0	0	0.1	0.2
Average relative humidity (%)	77	76	77	78	80	84	84	84	82	81	80	77	80
Mean monthly sunshine hours	55.2	62.1	70.0	108.5	139.8	129.8	168.3	191.3	171.6	135.0	119.9	96.6	1,448.1
Percentage possible sunshine	17	19	19	28	34	32	40	48	47	38	37	29	32
Source: China Meteorological Administration
