= Fengshan County =

Fengshan County 凤山县
- County
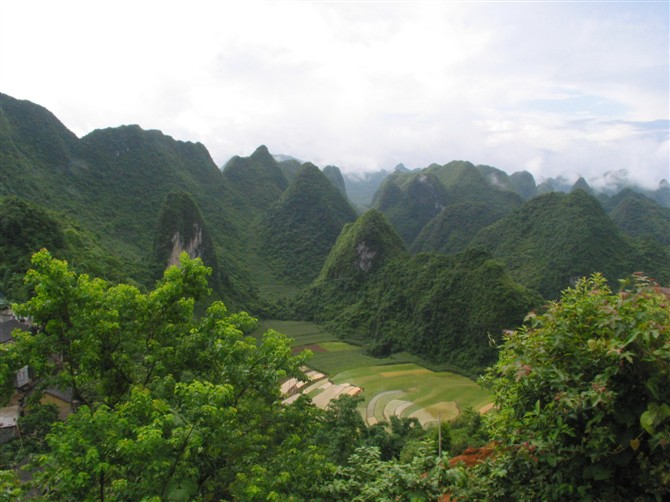
- Peak-cluster depressions

- Location in Guangxi
- Coordinates: 24°33′N 107°03′E
- Country: China
- Region: Guangxi
- Prefecture-level city: Hechi
- County seat: Fengcheng (凤城镇)

Area
  - Total: 1,743 km^{2} (673 sq mi)
- Elevation: 484 m (1,588 ft)

Population (2020)
  - Total: 169,845
  - Density: 97.44/km^{2} (252.4/sq mi)
- Time zone: UTC+8 (China Standard)
- Postal code: 547600
- Area code: 0778
- Website: www.gxfsx.gov.cn

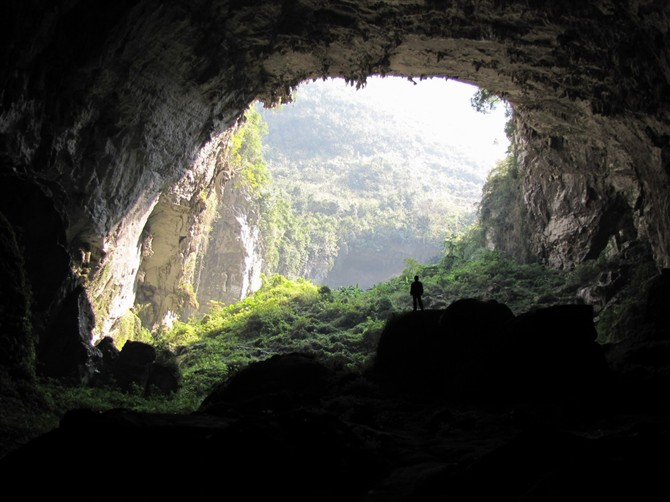
one of the many entrances of the Jiangzhou underground corridor

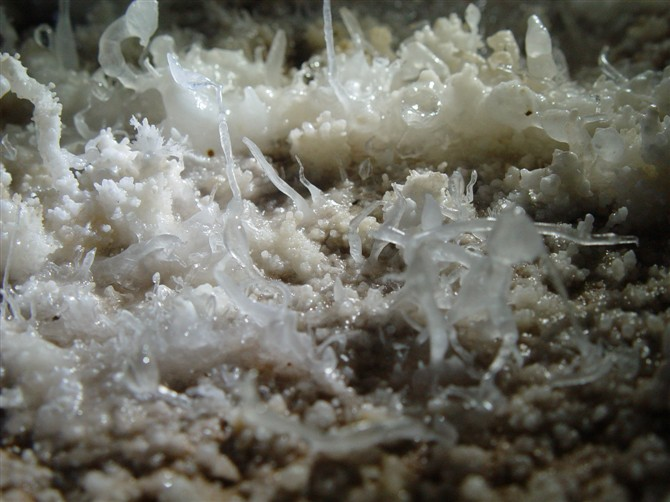
Curly crystal of Jiangzhou Underground Corridor

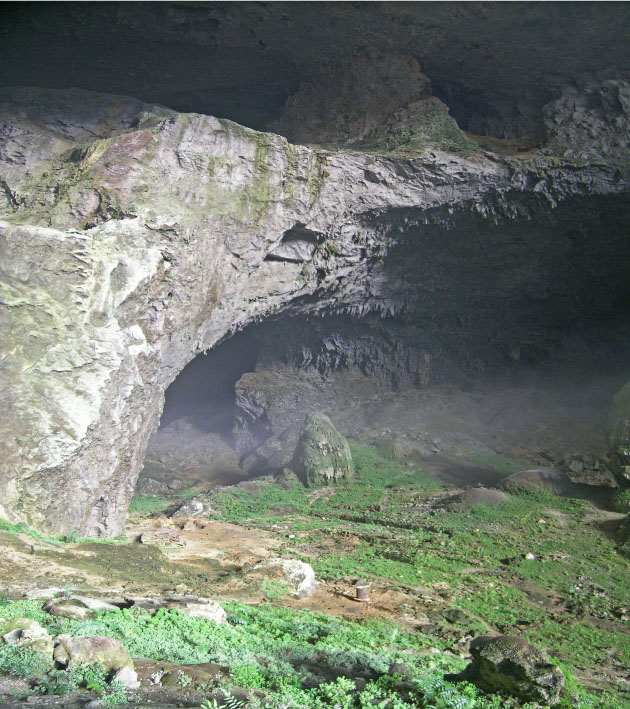
one of the many entrances of Mawangdong

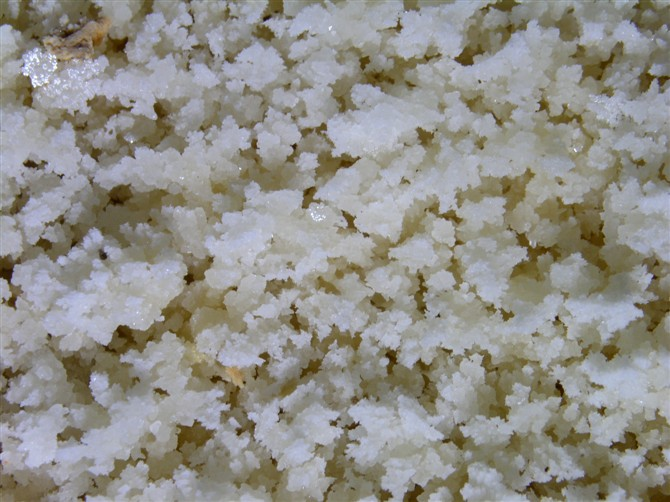
Crystal flowers found in Xixili cave

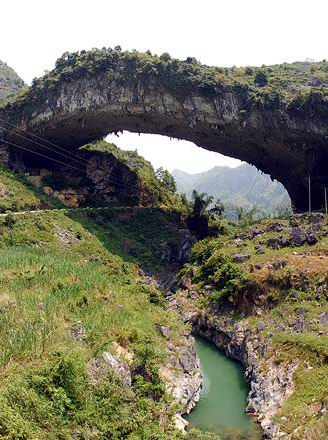
Jianzhou Natural Bridge

Fengshan County (simplified Chinese: 凤山县; traditional Chinese: 鳳山縣; pinyin: Fèngshān Xiàn; lit. 'phoenix mountain', Zhuang: Fonghsan Yen) is a county of Guangxi, China. It is under the administration of Hechi City.

== Administrative divisions ==
Fengshan County has 3 towns, 3 townships and 3 ethnic townships:

towns

- Fengcheng Town (凤城镇)
- Changzhou Town (长洲镇)
- Sanmenhai Town (三门海镇)

townships

- Zhaiya Township (砦牙乡)
- Qiaoyin Township (乔音乡)
- Zhongting Township (中亭乡)

ethnic townships

- Jinya Yao Ethnic Township (金牙瑶族乡)
- Pingle Yao Ethnic Township (平乐瑶族乡)
- Jiangzhou Yao Ethnic Township (江洲瑶族乡)

== Geography ==
Fengshan County is located in the northwest of Guangxi. The county takes its name from the shape of the mountain range in this region, which resembles a phoenix spreading its wings. The county is situated on a variety of geological formations, including karst, which is a landscape formed from the dissolution of soluble rocks—including limestone, dolomite and gypsum—and is characterized by sinkholes, caves and underground drainage systems. Karst is a rare formation seen in only a few locations worldwide.

== Geographic features ==
Fengshan County lies on the eastern fringe of the Yunnan–Guizhou Plateau and the terrain follows a northwest to southeast direction. 70% of the area, 1,738 square kilometres (671 sq mi), is covered by karst and arable land. The area has a subtropical monsoon climate with an average yearly temperature of 20 degrees Celsius.

== Climate ==
Climate data for Fengshan, elevation 509 m (1,670 ft), (1991–2020 normals, extremes 1981–2010)
Month	Jan	Feb	Mar	Apr	May	Jun	Jul	Aug	Sep	Oct	Nov	Dec	Year
Record high °C (°F)	28.4 (83.1)	32.4 (90.3)	35.0 (95.0)	36.6 (97.9)	36.6 (97.9)	36.5 (97.7)	36.9 (98.4)	36.4 (97.5)	36.9 (98.4)	34.0 (93.2)	31.0 (87.8)	28.9 (84.0)	36.9 (98.4)
Mean daily maximum °C (°F)	14.7 (58.5)	17.4 (63.3)	21.0 (69.8)	26.0 (78.8)	28.8 (83.8)	30.3 (86.5)	31.3 (88.3)	31.7 (89.1)	29.7 (85.5)	25.7 (78.3)	22.0 (71.6)	17.0 (62.6)	24.6 (76.3)
Daily mean °C (°F)	10.6 (51.1)	13.0 (55.4)	16.4 (61.5)	20.9 (69.6)	23.7 (74.7)	25.6 (78.1)	26.2 (79.2)	25.7 (78.3)	23.6 (74.5)	20.2 (68.4)	16.3 (61.3)	11.8 (53.2)	19.5 (67.1)
Mean daily minimum °C (°F)	8.0 (46.4)	10.2 (50.4)	13.4 (56.1)	17.6 (63.7)	20.4 (68.7)	22.7 (72.9)	23.2 (73.8)	22.4 (72.3)	20.2 (68.4)	17.0 (62.6)	13.0 (55.4)	8.7 (47.7)	16.4 (61.5)
Record low °C (°F)	−1.5 (29.3)	0.5 (32.9)	1.2 (34.2)	7.1 (44.8)	10.1 (50.2)	13.1 (55.6)	16.2 (61.2)	17.2 (63.0)	11.5 (52.7)	6.1 (43.0)	2.4 (36.3)	−2.0 (28.4)	−2.0 (28.4)
Average precipitation mm (inches)	32.0 (1.26)	23.4 (0.92)	48.3 (1.90)	89.1 (3.51)	221.1 (8.70)	337.4 (13.28)	289.8 (11.41)	219.5 (8.64)	140.0 (5.51)	102.7 (4.04)	41.2 (1.62)	27.6 (1.09)	1,572.1 (61.88)
Average precipitation days (≥ 0.1 mm)	11.1	9.9	13.4	13.5	15.6	18.4	19.3	17.0	11.5	9.9	8.6	8.0	156.2
Average snowy days	0.4	0.1	0	0	0	0	0	0	0	0	0	0.2	0.7
Average relative humidity (%)	77	75	76	76	78	82	83	83	81	80	78	76	79
Mean monthly sunshine hours	50.7	61.8	75.9	106.3	125.7	110.0	142.3	163.3	139.5	109.0	105.1	83.0	1,272.6
Percentage possible sunshine	15	19	20	28	30	27	34	41	38	31	32	25	28
Source: China Meteorological Administration

== Mineral resources ==
Fengshan County possesses mineral resources such as gold, pyrite, sulphur, limonite and copper. The pyrite reserves are estimated to be about 7,083 tons with an average grade of 17%.

== Karst resources ==
Fengshan has been described as the "kingdom of karst and the city of caves." There are more than 20 karst land formations such as huge caves, underground rivers, depressions, karst poljes, and sinkholes. According to statistics, there are 50 caves with chambers having an area of more than 2000 square meters and 19 caves with chambers that have an area that exceeds 10,000 square meters.

The largest caves are the Jiangzhou Underground Corridor, Mawangdong Cave and Gatundong Cave.

Jiangzhou Underground Corridor consists of many smaller caves, shafts and underground rivers. The corridor is 37,939 km (23,574 mi) and has an average slope gradient of 9°. The cave was developed in the Permian Period.

Jiangzhou Underground Corridor is rich in curly crystals, vast sparkling terraces, and colossal stalactites and stalagmites. It has 25 caverns, each having an area of between 4000 and 18500 square meters.

== Landforms ==
=== Mawangdong Cave ===
Mawangdong Cave (马王洞, 24.3943°N 107.0098°E) consists of three layers. The upper and middle layers are dry with a length, height and width of 7.7 km (4.8 mi), 80 to 150 m (260 to 490 ft) and 30 to 160 m (98 to 525 ft) respectively. The lower layer is an underground river channel. The cave's entrance is 130 m (430 ft) above the foothills and its mouth measures 94×138 m. A karst sinkhole known as a "Tiankeng" lies at the southern section of the cave. Its mouth has a tri-corner shape with rounded corners measuring 225 m×180 m. The depth of this sinkhole is 320 m (1,050 ft) and an accumulation of collapsed rocks and clay lies at the bottom of the sinkhole. The vegetation there is verdurous. The cave is named "Mawangdong", which literally means "Horse King Cave", since the cave entrance resembles a horse's mouth. This cave is a neighbor to Sanmenhai Cave (三门海洞, 24.4108°N 107.0308°E) and the two are connected by an underground river.

=== Xixili Cave ===
Xixili Cave is 1,760 m (5,770 ft) long and has three layers. The two upper layers each have a chamber with an area of 6,400 m^{2} (69,000 sq ft) and 6,900 m^{2} (74,000 sq ft), respectively. This cave contains flowstones, cave flags, hanging curtains, and cave crystals.

=== Jiangzhou Natural Bridge ===
Jiangzhou Natural Bridge is a karst formation spanning around 94.5 m (310 ft), ±11 m (36 ft), and connecting the two mountains.

It is 64.5 m (212 ft) high, with an arch height of 46 m (151 ft) and width of 18.5–24 m (61–79 ft). It is about 2 km (1.2 mi) east of the township of Jiangzhou in Guangxi, which is about 30 km (19 mi) south of Fengshan.

=== Yuanyang Springs ===
In the name "Yuan-yang" (simplified Chinese: 鸳鸯; traditional Chinese: 鴛鴦; pinyin: Yuānyāng), the words yuan and yang stand for male and female Mandarin Ducks, respectively. In symbolic representations, Mandarin Ducks always appear as a male and female pair and are seen to represent fidelity.

The Yuanyang Springs consist of two springs; the water of each spring has a distinctive color: one is a clear green, the other is turbid blue. Chemical analysis of their waters has shown that the composition is the same. The springs are approximately the same size. The surface pool is a rounded three-corner shape with a baseline of 21 meters and height of 30 meters. At certain times of the year, the water backflows.

=== Peak-cluster depressions ===
The term "Karst Fengcong" or karst peak cluster is a term created by Chinese scholars to classify karst by the hill or peak density. The term "Peak-cluster depression" describes the land form that combines peak-clusters and closed depressions, which are the two basic features of Fengcong.
