= Bama Town, Guangxi =

Bama Town 巴马镇
- Town
- Location in Guangxi
- Coordinates: 24°08′51″N 107°15′33″E
- Country: People's Republic of China
- Autonomous region: Guangxi
- Prefecture-level city: Hechi
- Autonomous county: Bama Yao Autonomous County

Area
  - Total: 247 km^{2} (95 sq mi)

Population (2018)
  - Total: 87,000
  - Density: 350/km^{2} (910/sq mi)
- Time zone: UTC+08:00 (China Standard)
- Postal code: 547500
- Area code: 0778

Bama (simplified Chinese: 巴马镇; traditional Chinese: 巴馬鎮; pinyin: Bāmǎ Zhèn) is a town in Bama Yao Autonomous County, Guangxi Zhuang Autonomous Region, China. As of the 2018 census it had a population of 87,000 and an area of 247 square kilometres (95 sq mi). There are Zhuang, Han, Yao, Mulao and Maonan nationalities living here.

== Administrative division ==
As of 2015, the town is divided into four communities and fourteen villages:

- Chengdong Community (城东社区)
- Chengzhong Community (城中社区)
- Chengnan Community (城南社区)
- Chengbei Community (城北社区)
- Bama (巴马村)
- Bafa (巴发村)
- Baliao (巴廖村)
- Shezhang (设长村)
- Panyang (盘阳村)
- Fafu (法福村)
- Lianxiang (练乡村)
- Poteng (坡腾村)
- Bading (巴定村)
- Cifu (赐福村)
- Naba (那坝村)
- Longhong (龙洪村)
- Jiemo (介莫村)
- Yuanji (元吉村)

== Geography ==
The town borders Fenghuang Township in the north, Dahua Yao Autonomous County in the east, Natao Township in the south, and the townships of Jiazhuan, Yandong and Xishan in the west.

The Panyang River (盘阳河) flows through the town west to east.

There are two major reservoirs in the town, namely the Bading Reservoir (巴定水库) and Enzhu Reservoir (恩助水库). Bading Reservoir covers a total catchment area of 9 km^{2} (3.5 sq mi) and has a storage capacity of some 470 m^{3} (17,000 cu ft) of water. Enzhu Reservoir can hold up to 129.7 m^{3} (4,580 cu ft) of water at full capacity.

== Demographics ==
Historical population
Year	Pop.	±%
2005	57,874	—
2015	86,000	+48.6%
2018	87,000	+1.2%

The population of Bama, according to the 2018 census, is 87,000.

== Economy ==
The town's economy is based on nearby mineral resources and agricultural resources. The main varieties of crops are rice, soybean, corn and hemp. Diabase, titanium, manganese, copper, mineral water and gold are the six major minerals in the town.

The Bama miniature pig (巴马香猪) is a local specialty pig.

== Education ==
- Bama No. 1 High School

== Tourist attractions ==
The Longevity Museum (长寿博物馆) is a museum in the town.

The Bama Yao Autonomous County National Stadium is a gymnasium in the town.

The Mujishan Park (母鸡山公园) is a public park located in the town.

== Transportation ==
The Provincial Highway S209 passes across the town northwest to southeast.

The National Highway G323 travels through the town northeast to southwest.
