= Dahua Yao Autonomous County =

Dahua County 大化县 · Dava Yen
- County
- 大化瑶族自治县 · Dava Yauzcuz Swciyen; Dahua Yao Autonomous County
- Location of the seat in Guangxi
- Coordinates: 23°44′43″N 107°59′30″E
- Country: China
- Autonomous region: Guangxi
- Prefecture-level city: Hechi
- County seat: Dahua Town

Area
  - Total: 2,754 km^{2} (1,063 sq mi)
- Time zone: UTC+8 (China Standard)

Dahua Yao Autonomous County (zhuang: Dava Yauzcuz Swci Yen; simplified Chinese: 大化瑶族自治县; traditional Chinese: 大化瑤族自治縣; pinyin: Dàhuà Yáozú Zìzhìxiàn) is a county of west-central Guangxi, China. It is under the administration of Hechi city. It was established on 23 December 1987.

== Administrative divisions ==
Dahua County is divided into 4 towns and 12 townships:

towns

- Dahua 大化镇
- Duyang 都阳镇
- Yantan 岩滩镇
- Beijing 北景镇

townships

- Gonghe 共和乡
- Gongchuan 贡川乡
- Baima 百马乡
- Guhe 古河乡
- Guwen 古文乡
- Jiangnan 江南乡
- Qiangwei 羌圩乡
- Yiwei 乙圩乡
- Baisheng 板升乡
- Qibainong 七百弄乡
- Yalong 雅龙乡
- Liuye 六也乡
