= List of administrative divisions of Guangxi =

Guangxi Zhuang Autonomous Region
- Autonomous region
- Capital: Nanning

Prefecture-level divisions
- Prefectural cities: 14

County level divisions
- County cities: 10
- Counties: 48
- Autonomous counties: 12
- Districts: 40

Township level divisions
- Towns: 707
- Townships: 367
- Ethnic townships: 50
- Subdistricts: 106

Villages level divisions
- Communities: 1,938
- Administrative villages: 14,272

Guangxi Zhuang Autonomous Region, an autonomous region of the People's Republic of China, is made up of the following three levels of administrative division.

== Administrative divisions ==
All of these administrative divisions are explained in greater detail at administrative divisions of China. This chart lists only prefecture-level and county-level divisions of Guangxi.

Prefecture level	County Level					
Prefecture level	Name	Chinese	Hanyu Pinyin	Zhuang	Division code	
Nanning city 南宁市; Nánníng Shì; Nanzningz Si (Capital) (4501 / NNG)	Xingning District	兴宁区	Xīngníng Qū	Hinghningz Gih	450102	XNE
Nanning city 南宁市; Nánníng Shì; Nanzningz Si (Capital) (4501 / NNG)	Qingxiu District	青秀区	Qīngxiù Qū	Cinghsiu Gih	450103	QNU
Nanning city 南宁市; Nánníng Shì; Nanzningz Si (Capital) (4501 / NNG)	Jiangnan District	江南区	Jiāngnán Qū	Gyanghnanz Gih	450105	JNA
Nanning city 南宁市; Nánníng Shì; Nanzningz Si (Capital) (4501 / NNG)	Xixiangtang District	西乡塘区	Xīxiāngtáng Qū	Sihyanghdangz Gih	450107	XXT
Nanning city 南宁市; Nánníng Shì; Nanzningz Si (Capital) (4501 / NNG)	Liangqing District	良庆区	Liángqìng Qū	Liengzging Gih	450108	LQI
Nanning city 南宁市; Nánníng Shì; Nanzningz Si (Capital) (4501 / NNG)	Yongning District	邕宁区	Yōngníng Qū	Yunghningz Gih	450109	YNG
Nanning city 南宁市; Nánníng Shì; Nanzningz Si (Capital) (4501 / NNG)	Wuming District	武鸣区	Wǔmíng Qū	Vujmingz Gih	450110	WMQ
Nanning city 南宁市; Nánníng Shì; Nanzningz Si (Capital) (4501 / NNG)	Long'an County	隆安县	Lóng'ān Xiàn	Lungzanh Yen	450123	LGA
Nanning city 南宁市; Nánníng Shì; Nanzningz Si (Capital) (4501 / NNG)	Mashan County	马山县	Mǎshān Xiàn	Majsanh Yen	450124	MSH
Nanning city 南宁市; Nánníng Shì; Nanzningz Si (Capital) (4501 / NNG)	Shanglin County	上林县	Shànglín Xiàn	Sanglinz Yen	450125	SLX
Nanning city 南宁市; Nánníng Shì; Nanzningz Si (Capital) (4501 / NNG)	Binyang County	宾阳县	Bīnyáng Xiàn	Binhyangz Yen	450126	BYX
Nanning city 南宁市; Nánníng Shì; Nanzningz Si (Capital) (4501 / NNG)	Hengzhou City	横州市	Héngzhōu Shì	Hwngzcouh Si	450181	HEN
Liuzhou city 柳州市; Liǔzhōu Shì; Liujcouh Si (4502 / LZH)	Chengzhong District	城中区	Chéngzhōng Qū	Cwngzcungh Gih	450202	CZG
Liuzhou city 柳州市; Liǔzhōu Shì; Liujcouh Si (4502 / LZH)	Yufeng District	鱼峰区	Yúfēng Qū	Yizfungh Gih	450203	YFQ
Liuzhou city 柳州市; Liǔzhōu Shì; Liujcouh Si (4502 / LZH)	Liunan District	柳南区	Liǔnán Qū	Liujnanz Gih	450204	LNU
Liuzhou city 柳州市; Liǔzhōu Shì; Liujcouh Si (4502 / LZH)	Liubei District	柳北区	Liǔběi Qū	Liujbwj Gih	450205	LBE
Liuzhou city 柳州市; Liǔzhōu Shì; Liujcouh Si (4502 / LZH)	Liujiang District	柳江区	Liǔjiāng Qū	Liujgyangh Gih	450206	LJI
Liuzhou city 柳州市; Liǔzhōu Shì; Liujcouh Si (4502 / LZH)	Liucheng County	柳城县	Liǔchéng Xiàn	Liujcwngz Yen	450222	LCB
Liuzhou city 柳州市; Liǔzhōu Shì; Liujcouh Si (4502 / LZH)	Luzhai County	鹿寨县	Lùzhài Xiàn	Luzcai Yen	450223	LZA
Liuzhou city 柳州市; Liǔzhōu Shì; Liujcouh Si (4502 / LZH)	Rong'an County	融安县	Róng'ān Xiàn	Yungz'anh Yen	450224	RAN
Liuzhou city 柳州市; Liǔzhōu Shì; Liujcouh Si (4502 / LZH)	Rongshui County (Note: Conventional name: Rongshui Miao Autonomous County; Chinese: 融水苗族自治县; pinyin: Róngshuǐ Miáozú Zìzhìxiàn; Zhuang: Yungzsuij Myauzcuz Swciyen)	融水县	Róngshuǐ Xiàn	Yungzsuij Yen	450225	RSI
Liuzhou city 柳州市; Liǔzhōu Shì; Liujcouh Si (4502 / LZH)	Sanjiang County (Note: Conventional name: Sanjiang Dong Autonomous County; Chinese: 三江侗族自治县; pinyin: Sānjiāng Dòngzú Zìzhìxiàn; Zhuang: Sanhgyangh Dungcuz Swciyen)	三江县	Sānjiāng Xiàn	Sanhgyangh Yen	450226	SJG
Guilin city 桂林市; Guìlín Shì; Gveilinz Si (4503 / KWL)	Xiufeng District	秀峰区	Xiùfēng Qū	Siufungh Gih	450302	XUF
Guilin city 桂林市; Guìlín Shì; Gveilinz Si (4503 / KWL)	Diecai District	叠彩区	Diécǎi Qū	Dezcaij Gih	450303	DCA
Guilin city 桂林市; Guìlín Shì; Gveilinz Si (4503 / KWL)	Xiangshan District	象山区	Xiàngshān Qū	Siengsanh Gih	450304	XSK
Guilin city 桂林市; Guìlín Shì; Gveilinz Si (4503 / KWL)	Qixing District	七星区	Qīxīng Qū	Gihsingh Gih	450305	QXG
Guilin city 桂林市; Guìlín Shì; Gveilinz Si (4503 / KWL)	Yanshan District	雁山区	Yànshān Qū	Yensanh Gih	450311	YSA
Guilin city 桂林市; Guìlín Shì; Gveilinz Si (4503 / KWL)	Lingui District	临桂区	Línguì Qū	Linzgvei Gih	450312	LGB
Guilin city 桂林市; Guìlín Shì; Gveilinz Si (4503 / KWL)	Yangshuo County	阳朔县	Yángshuò Xiàn	Yangzsoz Yen	450321	YSO
Guilin city 桂林市; Guìlín Shì; Gveilinz Si (4503 / KWL)	Lingchuan County	灵川县	Língchuān Xiàn	Lingzconh Yen	450323	LCU
Guilin city 桂林市; Guìlín Shì; Gveilinz Si (4503 / KWL)	Quanzhou County	全州县	Quánzhōu Xiàn	Cenzcouh Yen	450324	QZO
Guilin city 桂林市; Guìlín Shì; Gveilinz Si (4503 / KWL)	Xing'an County	兴安县	Xīng’ān Xiàn	Hingh'anh Yen	450325	XAG
Guilin city 桂林市; Guìlín Shì; Gveilinz Si (4503 / KWL)	Yongfu County	永福县	Yǒngfú Xiàn	Yungjfuz Yen	450326	YFU
Guilin city 桂林市; Guìlín Shì; Gveilinz Si (4503 / KWL)	Guanyang County	灌阳县	Guànyáng Xiàn	Gvan'yangz Yen	450327	GNY
Guilin city 桂林市; Guìlín Shì; Gveilinz Si (4503 / KWL)	Longsheng County (Note: Conventional name: Longsheng Various Nationalities Autonomous County; Chinese: 龙胜各族自治县; pinyin: Lóngshèng Gèzú Zìzhìxiàn; Zhuang: Lungzswng Gozcuz Swciyen)	龙胜县	Lóngshèng Xiàn	Lungzswng Yen	450328	LSG
Guilin city 桂林市; Guìlín Shì; Gveilinz Si (4503 / KWL)	Ziyuan County	资源县	Zīyuán Xiàn	Swhyenz Yen	450329	ZYU
Guilin city 桂林市; Guìlín Shì; Gveilinz Si (4503 / KWL)	Pingle County	平乐县	Pínglè Xiàn	Bingzloz Yen	450330	PLE
Guilin city 桂林市; Guìlín Shì; Gveilinz Si (4503 / KWL)	Gongcheng County (Note: Conventional name: Gongcheng Yao Autonomous County; Chinese: 恭城瑶族自治县; pinyin: Gōngchéng Yáozú Zìzhìxiàn; Zhuang: Gunghcwngz Yauzcuz Swciyen)	恭城县	Gōngchéng Xiàn	Gunghcwngz Yen	450332	GGC
Guilin city 桂林市; Guìlín Shì; Gveilinz Si (4503 / KWL)	Lipu City	荔浦市	Lìpǔ Shì	Libuj Si	450381	
Wuzhou city 梧州市; Wúzhōu Shì; Vuzcouh Si (4504 / WUZ)	Wanxiu District	万秀区	Wànxiù Qū	Vansiu Gih	450403	WXQ
Wuzhou city 梧州市; Wúzhōu Shì; Vuzcouh Si (4504 / WUZ)	Changzhou District	长洲区	Chángzhōu Qū	Cangzcouh Gih	450405	CHO
Wuzhou city 梧州市; Wúzhōu Shì; Vuzcouh Si (4504 / WUZ)	Longxu District	龙圩区	Lóngxū Qū	Lungzhih Gih	450406	LXV
Wuzhou city 梧州市; Wúzhōu Shì; Vuzcouh Si (4504 / WUZ)	Cangwu County	苍梧县	Cāngwú Xiàn	Canghvuz Yen	450421	CAW
Wuzhou city 梧州市; Wúzhōu Shì; Vuzcouh Si (4504 / WUZ)	Tengxian County (Note: Official name registered by the Ministry of Civil Affairs.)	藤县	Téngxiàn	Dwngz Yen	450422	TEG
Wuzhou city 梧州市; Wúzhōu Shì; Vuzcouh Si (4504 / WUZ)	Mengshan County	蒙山县	Méngshān Xiàn	Mungzsanh Yen	450423	MSA
Wuzhou city 梧州市; Wúzhōu Shì; Vuzcouh Si (4504 / WUZ)	Cenxi city	岑溪市	Cénxī Shi	Cinzhih Si	450481	CEX
Beihai city 北海市; Běihǎi Shì; Bwzhaij Si (4505 / BHY)	Haicheng District	海城区	Hǎichéng Qū	Haijcwngz Gih	450502	HCB
Beihai city 北海市; Běihǎi Shì; Bwzhaij Si (4505 / BHY)	Yinhai District	银海区	Yínhǎi Qū	Yinzhaij Gih	450503	YHB
Beihai city 北海市; Běihǎi Shì; Bwzhaij Si (4505 / BHY)	Tieshangang District	铁山港区	Tiěshāngǎng Qū	Dejsanhgangj Gih	450512	TSG
Beihai city 北海市; Běihǎi Shì; Bwzhaij Si (4505 / BHY)	Hepu County	合浦县	Hépǔ Xiàn	Hozbuj Yen	450521	HPX
Fangchenggang city 防城港市; Fángchénggǎng Shì; Fangzcwngzgangj Si (4506 / FAN)	Gangkou District	港口区	Gǎngkǒu Qū	Gangzgouj Gih	450602	GKQ
Fangchenggang city 防城港市; Fángchénggǎng Shì; Fangzcwngzgangj Si (4506 / FAN)	Fangcheng District	防城区	Fángchéng Qū	Fangzcwngz Gih	450603	FCQ
Fangchenggang city 防城港市; Fángchénggǎng Shì; Fangzcwngzgangj Si (4506 / FAN)	Shangsi County	上思县	Shàngsī Xiàn	Sangswh Yen	450621	SGS
Fangchenggang city 防城港市; Fángchénggǎng Shì; Fangzcwngzgangj Si (4506 / FAN)	Dongxing city	东兴市	Dōngxīng Shì	Dunghhingh Si	450681	DOX
Qinzhou city 钦州市; Qīnzhōu Shì; Ginhcouh Si (4507 / QZH)	Qinnan District	钦南区	Qīnnán Qū	Ginhnanz Gih	450702	QNQ
Qinzhou city 钦州市; Qīnzhōu Shì; Ginhcouh Si (4507 / QZH)	Qinbei District	钦北区	Qīnběi Qū	Ginhbwz Gih	450703	QBQ
Qinzhou city 钦州市; Qīnzhōu Shì; Ginhcouh Si (4507 / QZH)	Lingshan County	灵山县	Língshān Xiàn	Lingzsanh Yen	450721	LSB
Qinzhou city 钦州市; Qīnzhōu Shì; Ginhcouh Si (4507 / QZH)	Pubei County	浦北县	Pǔběi Xiàn	Bujbwz Yen	450722	PBE
Guigang city 贵港市; Guìgǎng Shì; Gveigangj Si (4508 / GUG)	Gangbei District	港北区	Gǎngběi Qū	Gangjbwz Gih	450802	GBE
Guigang city 贵港市; Guìgǎng Shì; Gveigangj Si (4508 / GUG)	Gangnan District	港南区	Gǎngnán Qū	Gangjnanz Gih	450803	GNQ
Guigang city 贵港市; Guìgǎng Shì; Gveigangj Si (4508 / GUG)	Qintang District	覃塘区	Qíntáng Qū (Note: not Tántáng)	Cinzdangz Gih	450804	QTQ
Guigang city 贵港市; Guìgǎng Shì; Gveigangj Si (4508 / GUG)	Pingnan County	平南县	Píngnán Xiàn	Bingznanz Yen	450821	PNN
Guigang city 贵港市; Guìgǎng Shì; Gveigangj Si (4508 / GUG)	Guiping city	桂平市	Guìpíng Shì	Gveibingz Si	450881	GPS
Yulin city 玉林市; Yùlín Shì; Yilinz Si (4509 / YUL)	Yuzhou District	玉州区	Yùzhōu Qū	Yicouh Gih	450902	YZO
Yulin city 玉林市; Yùlín Shì; Yilinz Si (4509 / YUL)	Fumian District	福绵区	Fúmián Qū	Fuzmyanz Gih	450903	FMI
Yulin city 玉林市; Yùlín Shì; Yilinz Si (4509 / YUL)	Rongxian County	容县	Róngxiàn	Yungz Yen	450921	ROG
Yulin city 玉林市; Yùlín Shì; Yilinz Si (4509 / YUL)	Luchuan County	陆川县	Lùchuān Xiàn	Luzconh Yen	450922	LCJ
Yulin city 玉林市; Yùlín Shì; Yilinz Si (4509 / YUL)	Bobai County	博白县	Bóbái Xiàn	Bozbwz Yen	450923	BBA
Yulin city 玉林市; Yùlín Shì; Yilinz Si (4509 / YUL)	Xingye County	兴业县	Xīngyè Xiàn	Hinghyez Yen	450924	XGY
Yulin city 玉林市; Yùlín Shì; Yilinz Si (4509 / YUL)	Beiliu city	北流市	Běiliú Shì	Bwzliuz Si	450981	BLS
Baise city 百色市; Bǎisè Shì; Bwzswz Si (4510 / BSS)	Youjiang District	右江区	Yòujiāng Qū	Yougyangh Gih	451002	YOQ
Baise city 百色市; Bǎisè Shì; Bwzswz Si (4510 / BSS)	Tianyang District	田阳区	Tiányáng Qū	Denzyangz Gih	451003	TYG
Baise city 百色市; Bǎisè Shì; Bwzswz Si (4510 / BSS)	Tiandong County	田东县	Tiándōng Xiàn	Denzdungh Yen	451022	TDO
Baise city 百色市; Bǎisè Shì; Bwzswz Si (4510 / BSS)	Debao County	德保县	Débǎo Xiàn	Dwzbauj Yen	451024	DEB
Baise city 百色市; Bǎisè Shì; Bwzswz Si (4510 / BSS)	Napo County	那坡县	Nàpō Xiàn	Nazboh Yen	451026	NPO
Baise city 百色市; Bǎisè Shì; Bwzswz Si (4510 / BSS)	Lingyun County	凌云县	Língyún Xiàn	Lingzyinz Yen	451027	LYN
Baise city 百色市; Bǎisè Shì; Bwzswz Si (4510 / BSS)	Leye County	乐业县	Lèyè Xiàn	Lozyez Yen	451028	LYE
Baise city 百色市; Bǎisè Shì; Bwzswz Si (4510 / BSS)	Tianlin County	田林县	Tiánlín Xiàn	Denzlinz Yen	451029	TLN
Baise city 百色市; Bǎisè Shì; Bwzswz Si (4510 / BSS)	Xilin County	西林县	Xīlín Xiàn	Sihlinz Yen	451030	XLX
Baise city 百色市; Bǎisè Shì; Bwzswz Si (4510 / BSS)	Longlin County (Note: Conventional name: Longlin Various Nationalities Autonomous County; Chinese: 隆林各族自治县; pinyin: Lónglín Gèzú Zìzhìxiàn; Zhuang: Lungzlinz Gakcuz Swciyen)	隆林县	Lónglín Xiàn	Lungzlinz Yen	451031	LLN
Baise city 百色市; Bǎisè Shì; Bwzswz Si (4510 / BSS)	Jingxi city	靖西市	Jìngxī Shì	Cingsih Si	451081	JXD
Baise city 百色市; Bǎisè Shì; Bwzswz Si (4510 / BSS)	Pingguo city	平果市	Píngguǒ Shì	Bingzgoj Si	451082	
Hezhou city 贺州市; Hèzhōu Shì; Hocouh Si (4511 / HZO)	Babu District	八步区	Bābù Qū	Bahbu Gih	451102	BBQ
Hezhou city 贺州市; Hèzhōu Shì; Hocouh Si (4511 / HZO)	Pinggui District	平桂区	Píngguì Qū	Bingzgvei Gih	451103	PGI
Hezhou city 贺州市; Hèzhōu Shì; Hocouh Si (4511 / HZO)	Zhaoping County	昭平县	Zhāopíng Xiàn	Cauhbingz Yen	451121	ZPG
Hezhou city 贺州市; Hèzhōu Shì; Hocouh Si (4511 / HZO)	Zhongshan County	钟山县	Zhōngshān Xiàn	Cunghsanh Yen	451122	ZSG
Hezhou city 贺州市; Hèzhōu Shì; Hocouh Si (4511 / HZO)	Fuchuan County (Note: Conventional name: Fuchuan Yao Autonomous County; Chinese: 富川瑶族自治县; pinyin: Fùchuān Yáozú Zìzhìxiàn; Zhuang: Fuconh Yauzcuz Swciyen)	富川县	Fùchuān Xiàn	Fuconh Yen	451123	FUC
Hechi city 河池市; Héchí Shì; Hozciz Si (4512 / HCS)	Jinchengjiang District	金城江区	Jīnchéngjiāng Qū	Ginhcwngzgyangh Gih	451202	JCI
Hechi city 河池市; Héchí Shì; Hozciz Si (4512 / HCS)	Yizhou District	宜州区	Yízhōu Qū	Yizcouh Gih	451203	YZC
Hechi city 河池市; Héchí Shì; Hozciz Si (4512 / HCS)	Nandan County	南丹县	Nándān Xiàn	Nanzdanh Yen	451221	NDN
Hechi city 河池市; Héchí Shì; Hozciz Si (4512 / HCS)	Tian'e County	天峨县	Tiān'é Xiàn	Denhngoz Yen	451222	TEX
Hechi city 河池市; Héchí Shì; Hozciz Si (4512 / HCS)	Fengshan County	凤山县	Fèngshān Xiàn	Fungsanh Yen	451223	FSA
Hechi city 河池市; Héchí Shì; Hozciz Si (4512 / HCS)	Donglan County	东兰县	Dōnglán Xiàn	Dunghlanz Yen	451224	DLN
Hechi city 河池市; Héchí Shì; Hozciz Si (4512 / HCS)	Luocheng County (Note: Conventional name: Luocheng Mulao Autonomous County; Chinese: 罗城仫佬族自治县; pinyin: Luóchéng Mùlǎozú Zìzhìxiàn; Zhuang: Lozcwngz Mulaujcuz Swciyen)	罗城县	Luóchéng Xiàn	Lozcwngz Yen	451225	LOC
Hechi city 河池市; Héchí Shì; Hozciz Si (4512 / HCS)	Huanjiang County (Note: Conventional name: Huanjiang Maonan Autonomous County; Chinese: 环江毛南族自治县; pinyin: Huánjiāng Máonánzú Zìzhìxiàn; Zhuang: Vanzgyangh Mauznanzcuz Swciyen)	环江县	Huánjiāng Xiàn	Vanzgyangh Yen	451226	HNJ
Hechi city 河池市; Héchí Shì; Hozciz Si (4512 / HCS)	Bama County (Note: Conventional name: Bama Yao Autonomous County; Chinese: 巴马瑶族自治县; pinyin: Bāmǎ Yáozú Zìzhìxiàn; Zhuang: Bahmaj Yauzcuz Swciyen)	巴马县	Bāmǎ Xiàn	Bahmaj Yen	451227	BMA
Hechi city 河池市; Héchí Shì; Hozciz Si (4512 / HCS)	Du'an County (Note: Conventional name: Du'an Yao Autonomous County; Chinese: 都安瑶族自治县; pinyin: Dū'ān Yáozú Zìzhìxiàn; Zhuang: Duhanh Yauzcuz Swciyen)	都安县	Dū'ān Xiàn	Duhanh Yen	451228	DUA
Hechi city 河池市; Héchí Shì; Hozciz Si (4512 / HCS)	Dahua County (Note: Conventional name: Dahua Yao Autonomous County; Chinese: 大化瑶族自治县; pinyin: Dàhuà Yáozú Zìzhìxiàn; Zhuang: Dava Yauzcuz Swciyen)	大化县	Dàhuà Xiàn	Dava Yen	451229	DAH
Laibin city 来宾市; Láibīn Shì; Laizbinh Si (4513 / LIB)	Xingbin District	兴宾区	Xīngbīn Qū	Hinghbinh Gih	451302	XNB
Laibin city 来宾市; Láibīn Shì; Laizbinh Si (4513 / LIB)	Xincheng County	忻城县	Xīnchéng Xiàn	Yinhcwngz Yen	451321	XCH
Laibin city 来宾市; Láibīn Shì; Laizbinh Si (4513 / LIB)	Xiangzhou County	象州县	Xiàngzhōu Xiàn	Siengcouh Yen	451322	XGZ
Laibin city 来宾市; Láibīn Shì; Laizbinh Si (4513 / LIB)	Wuxuan County	武宣县	Wǔxuān Xiàn	Vujsenh Yen	451323	WXN
Laibin city 来宾市; Láibīn Shì; Laizbinh Si (4513 / LIB)	Jinxiu County (Note: Conventional name: Jinxiu Yao Autonomous County; Chinese: 金秀瑶族自治县; pinyin: Jīnxiù Yáozú Zìzhìxiàn; Zhuang: Ginhsiu Yauzcuz Swciyen)	金秀县	Jīnxiù Xiàn	Ginhsiu Yen	451324	JXU
Laibin city 来宾市; Láibīn Shì; Laizbinh Si (4513 / LIB)	Heshan city	合山市	Héshān Shì	Hozsanh Si	451381	HSS
Chongzuo city 崇左市; Chóngzuǒ Shì; Cungzcoj Si (4514 / COZ)	Jiangzhou District	江州区	Jiāngzhōu Qū	Gyanghcouh Gih	451402	JOQ
Chongzuo city 崇左市; Chóngzuǒ Shì; Cungzcoj Si (4514 / COZ)	Fusui County	扶绥县	Fúsuí Xiàn	Fuzsuih Yen	451421	FSU
Chongzuo city 崇左市; Chóngzuǒ Shì; Cungzcoj Si (4514 / COZ)	Ningming County	宁明县	Níngmíng Xiàn	Ningzmingz Yen	451422	NMG
Chongzuo city 崇左市; Chóngzuǒ Shì; Cungzcoj Si (4514 / COZ)	Longzhou County	龙州县	Lóngzhōu Xiàn	Lungzcouh Yen	451423	LZX
Chongzuo city 崇左市; Chóngzuǒ Shì; Cungzcoj Si (4514 / COZ)	Daxin County	大新县	Dàxīn Xiàn	Dasinh Yen	451424	DXN
Chongzuo city 崇左市; Chóngzuǒ Shì; Cungzcoj Si (4514 / COZ)	Tiandeng County	天等县	Tiānděng Xiàn	Denhdwngj Yen	451425	TDG
Chongzuo city 崇左市; Chóngzuǒ Shì; Cungzcoj Si (4514 / COZ)	Pingxiang city	凭祥市	Píngxiáng Shì	Bingzsiengz Si	451481	PIN

== Recent changes in administrative divisions ==
Date	Before	After	Note	Reference
1980-04-05	Chaoyang District	Xingning District	renamed	
1980-04-05	Hengyang District	Chengbei District	renamed	
1981-05-07	parts of Guilin Prefecture	Guilin (P-City)	transferred	
1981-05-07	↳ Yangshuo County	↳ Yangshuo County	transferred	
1981-06-30	parts of Laibin County	Heshan (PC-City)	established	
1983-01-18	all Province-controlled city (P-City) → Prefecture-level city (PL-City)			Civil Affairs Announcement
1983-01-18	all Prefecture-controlled city (PC-City) → County-level city (CL-City)			Civil Affairs Announcement
1983-08-30	Luocheng County	Luocheng County (Aut.)	reorganized	
1983-08-30	Fuchuan County	Fuchuan County (Aut.)	reorganized	
1983-08-30	parts of Nanning Prefecture	Nanning (PL-City)	transferred	
1983-08-30	↳ Yongning County	↳ Yongning County	transferred	
1983-08-30	↳ Wuming County	↳ Wuming County	transferred	
1983-08-30	parts of Liuzhou Prefecture	Liuzhou (PL-City)	transferred	
1983-08-30	↳ Liujiang County	↳ Liujiang County	transferred	
1983-08-30	↳ Liucheng County	↳ Liucheng County	transferred	
1983-08-30	parts of Guilin Prefecture	Guilin (PL-City)	transferred	
1983-08-30	↳ Lingui County	↳ Lingui County	transferred	
1983-08-30	parts of Wuzhou Prefecture	Wuzhou (PL-City)	transferred	
1983-08-30	↳ Cangwu County	↳ Cangwu County	transferred	
1983-08-30	parts of Qinzhou Prefecture	Beihai (PL-City) city district	established	
1983-08-30	↳ Beihai (CL-City)	Beihai (PL-City) city district	disestablished	
1983-08-30	Hechi County	Hechi (CL-City)	reorganized	
1983-08-30	Yulin County	Yulin (CL-City)	reorganized	
1983-08-30	Qinzhou County	Qinzhou (CL-City)	reorganized	
1983-08-30	Bose County	Bose (CL-City)	reorganized	
1984-06-23	parts of Xincheng District	Jiao District, Nanning	established	
1984-06-23	parts of Xingning District	Jiao District, Nanning	established	
1984-06-23	parts of Chengbei District	Jiao District, Nanning	established	
1984-06-23	parts of Yongxin District	Jiao District, Nanning	established	
1984-06-23	parts of Jiangnan District	Jiao District, Nanning	established	
1984-06-23	parts of Chengzhong District	Jiao District, Liuzhou	established	
1984-06-23	parts of Yufeng District	Jiao District, Liuzhou	established	
1984-06-23	parts of Liubei District	Jiao District, Liuzhou	established	
1984-06-23	parts of Liunan District	Jiao District, Liuzhou	established	
1984-06-23	parts of Xiangshan District	Jiao District, Guilin	established	
1984-06-23	parts of Xiufeng District	Jiao District, Guilin	established	
1984-06-23	parts of Diecai District	Jiao District, Guilin	established	
1984-06-23	parts of Qixing District	Jiao District, Guilin	established	
1984-06-23	parts of Wanxiu District	Jiao District, Wuzhou	established	
1984-06-23	parts of Dieshan District	Jiao District, Wuzhou	established	
1984-09-08	parts of Wanxiu District	Baiyun District	established	
1984-09-11	Beihai (PL-City) city district	Haicheng District	established	
1984-09-11	Beihai (PL-City) city district	Jiao District, Baihai	established	
1986-11-01	Huanjiang County	Huanjiang County (Aut.)	reorganized	
1987-05-21	parts of Qinzhou Prefecture	Beihai (PL-City)	transferred	
1987-05-21	↳ Hepu County	↳ Hepu County	transferred	
1987-12-23	parts of Du'an County (Aut.)	Dahua County (Aut.)	established	
1987-12-23	parts of Bama County (Aut.)	Dahua County (Aut.)	established	
1988-12-27	Gui County	Guigang (CL-City)	reorganized	
1990-02-03	Gongcheng County	Gongcheng County (Aut.)	reorganized	
1990-11-01	Baiyun District	Wanxiu District	merged	
1993-05-23	parts of Qinzhou Prefecture	Fangchenggang (PL-City)	established	
1993-05-23	↳ Fangchenggang County (Aut.)	↳ Gangkou District	disestablished & established	
1993-05-23	↳ Fangchenggang County (Aut.)	↳ Fangcheng District	disestablished & established	
1993-09-09	Yishan County	Yizhou (CL-City)	reorganized	
1994-04-18	Beiliu County	Beiliu (CL-City)	reorganized	Civil Affairs [1994]60
1994-05-18	Guiping County	Guiping (CL-City)	reorganized	Civil Affairs [1994]80
1994-06-28	Qinzhou Prefecture	Qinzhou (PL-City)	reorganized	State Council [1994]
1994-06-28	Qinzhou (CL-City)	Qinnan District	disestablished & established	State Council [1994]
1994-06-28	Qinzhou (CL-City)	Qinbei District	disestablished & merged into	State Council [1994]
1994-12-17	Jiao District, Beihai	Yinhai District	renamed	State Council [1994]137
1994-12-17	parts of Hepu County	Tieshangang District	established	State Council [1994]137
1995-09-11	Cenxi County	Cenxi (CL-City)	reorganized	Civil Affairs [1995]63
1995-09-11	parts of Yulin Prefecture	Guigang (PL-City)	established	State Council [1995]96
1995-09-11	↳ Guigang (CL-City)	↳ Gangbei District	disestablished & established	State Council [1995]96
1995-09-11	↳ Guigang (CL-City)	↳ Gangnan District	disestablished & established	State Council [1995]96
1995-09-11	↳ Pingnan County	↳ Pingnan County	transferred	State Council [1995]96
1995-09-11	↳ Guiping (CL-City)	↳ Guiping (CL-City)	transferred	State Council [1995]96
1996-04-29	parts of Fangcheng District	Dongxing (CL-City)	established	Civil Affairs [1996]26
1996-12-02	Jiao District, Guilin	Yanshan District	renamed	
1996-12-02	Jiao District, Guilin	Xiufeng District	merged into	
1996-12-02	Jiao District, Guilin	Diecai District	merged into	
1996-12-02	Jiao District, Guilin	Xiangshan District	merged into	
1996-12-02	Jiao District, Guilin	Qixing District	merged into	
1997-02-27	He County	Hezhou (CL-City)	reorganized	State Council [1997]12
1997-02-27	Wuzhou Prefecture	Hezhou Prefecture	renamed	State Council [1997]12
1997-02-27	Wuzhou Prefecture	Wuzhou (PL-City)	merged into	State Council [1997]12
1997-02-27	↳ Teng County	↳ Teng County	transferred	State Council [1997]12
1997-02-27	↳ Mengshan County	↳ Mengshan County	transferred	State Council [1997]12
1997-02-27	↳ Cenxi (CL-City)	↳ Cenxi (CL-City)	transferred	State Council [1997]12
1997-04-22	Yulin Prefecture	Yulin (PL-City)	reorganized	State Council [1997]26
1997-04-22	Yulin (CL-City)	Yuzhou District	disestablished & established	State Council [1997]26
1997-04-22	Yulin (CL-City)	Xingye County	disestablished & established	State Council [1997]26
1998-08-27	Guilin Prefecture	Guilin (PL-City)	merged into	State Council [1998]73
2001-10-15	Jiao District, Nanning	Xincheng District	merged into	State Council [2001]150
2001-10-15	Jiao District, Nanning	Xingning District	merged into	State Council [2001]150
2001-10-15	Jiao District, Nanning	Chengbei District	merged into	State Council [2001]150
2001-10-15	Jiao District, Nanning	Yongxin District	merged into	State Council [2001]150
2001-10-15	Jiao District, Nanning	Jiangnan District	merged into	State Council [2001]150
2002-06-02	Bose Prefecture	Baise (PL-City)	reorganized	State Council [2002]47
2002-06-02	Bose (CL-City)	Youjiang District	reorganized	State Council [2002]47
2002-06-02	Hezhou Prefecture	Hezhou (PL-City)	reorganized	State Council [2002]52
2002-06-02	Hezhou (CL-City)	Babu District	reorganized	State Council [2002]52
2002-06-02	Hechi Prefecture	Hechi (PL-City)	reorganized	State Council [2002]52
2002-06-02	Hechi (CL-City)	Jinchengjiang District	reorganized	State Council [2002]52
2002-06-22	Jiao District, Liuzhou	Chengzhong District	merged into	State Council [2002]57
2002-06-22	Jiao District, Liuzhou	Yufeng District	merged into	State Council [2002]57
2002-06-22	Jiao District, Liuzhou	Liubei District	merged into	State Council [2002]57
2002-06-22	Jiao District, Liuzhou	Liunan District	merged into	State Council [2002]57
2002-09-29	Liuzhou Prefecture	Liuzhou (PL-City)	merged into	State Council [2002]88
2002-09-29	Liuzhou Prefecture	Laibin (PL-City)	established	State Council [2002]88
2002-09-29	↳ Laibin County	↳ Xingbin District	transferred & reorganized	State Council [2002]88
2002-09-29	↳ Xincheng County	↳ Xincheng County	transferred	State Council [2002]88
2002-09-29	↳ Xiangzhou County	↳ Xiangzhou County	transferred	State Council [2002]88
2002-09-29	↳ Wuxuan County	↳ Wuxuan County	transferred	State Council [2002]88
2002-09-29	↳ Jinxiu County	↳ Jinxiu County (Aut.)	transferred	State Council [2002]88
2002-09-29	↳ Heshan (CL-City)	↳ Heshan (CL-City)	transferred	State Council [2002]88
2002-12-23	Nanning Prefecture	Nanning (PL-City)	merged into	State Council [2002]121
2002-12-23	Nanning Prefecture	Chongzuo (PL-City)	established	State Council [2002]121
2002-12-23	↳ Chongzuo County	↳ Jiangzhou District	transferred & reorganized	State Council [2002]121
2002-12-23	↳ Fusui County	↳ Fusui County	transferred	State Council [2002]121
2002-12-23	↳ Daxin County	↳ Daxin County	transferred	State Council [2002]121
2002-12-23	↳ Tiandeng County	↳ Tiandeng County	transferred	State Council [2002]121
2002-12-23	↳ Ningming County	↳ Ningming County	transferred	State Council [2002]121
2002-12-23	↳ Longzhou County	↳ Longzhou County	transferred	State Council [2002]121
2002-12-23	↳ Pingxiang (CL-City)	↳ Pingxiang (CL-City)	transferred	State Council [2002]121
2003-01-02	parts of Jiao District, Wuzhou	Changzhou District	reorganized	State Council [2003]1
2003-01-02	parts of Jiao District, Wuzhou	Wanxiu District	merged into	State Council [2003]1
2003-03-06	parts of Gangbei District	Qintang District	established	State Council [2003]37
2004-09-15	Chengbei District	Xixiangtang District	disestablished & established	State Council [2004]79
2004-09-15	Yongxin District	Xixiangtang District	disestablished & established	State Council [2004]79
2004-09-15	Yongning County	Yongning District	reorganized	State Council [2004]79
2004-09-15	Yongning County	Liangqing District	established	State Council [2004]79
2004-09-15	Yongning County	Jiangnan District	established	State Council [2004]79
2004-09-15	Xincheng District	Qingxiu District	renamed	State Council [2004]79
2013-01-18	Lingui County	Lingui District	reorganized	State Council [2013]17
2013-02-08	Dieshan District	Wanxiu District	merged into	State Council [2013]25
2013-02-08	parts of Cangwu County	Longxu District	established	State Council [2013]25
2013-06-28	parts of Yuzhou District	Fumian District	established	State Council [2013]75
2015-02-16	Wuming County	Wuming District	reorganized	State Council [2015]35
2015-08-01	Jingxi County	Jingxi (CL-City)	reorganized	Civil Affairs [2015]247
2016-03-20	Liujiang County	Liujiang District	reorganized	State Council [2016]55
2016-06-08	parts of Babu District	Pinggui District	established	State Council [2016]101
2016-06-08	parts of Zhongshan County	Pinggui District	established	State Council [2016]101
2016-11-24	Yizhou (CL-City)	Yizhou District	reorganized	State Council [2016]190
2018-07-02	Lipu County	Lipu (CL-City)	reorganized	Civil Affairs [2018]106
2019-06-27	Tianyang County	Tianyang District	reorganized	State Council [2019]62
2019-11-20	Pingguo County	Pingguo (CL-City)	reorganized	Civil Affairs [2019]122

== Population composition ==
=== Prefectures ===
Prefecture	2010	2000
Baise	3,826,300	3,640,800
Hechi	3,991,900	3,794,000
Liuzhou	3,758,700	3,602,800
Guilin	4,988,400	4,832,800
Hezhou	2,231,900	2,056,800
Chongzuo	2,347,700	2,261,600
Nanning	6,661,600	6,208,000
Laibin	2,498,200	2,407,500
Guigang	5,033,100	4,599,600
Wuzhou	3,273,300	2,891,100
Fangchenggang	860,100	777,200
Qinzhou	3,791,100	3,248,000
Beihai	1,617,500	1,414,900
Yulin, Guangxi	6,712,300	5,796,800

=== Counties ===
Name	Prefecture	2010
Xingning	Nanning	398,789
Qingxiu	Nanning	709,721
Jiangnan	Nanning	567,999
Xixiangtang	Nanning	1,156,173
Liangqing	Nanning	344,768
Yongning	Nanning	259,721
Wuming	Nanning	544,478
Long'an	Nanning	300,215
Mashan	Nanning	390,900
Shanglin	Nanning	343,590
Binyang	Nanning	782,255
Heng(xian)	Nanning	863,001
Chengzhong	Liuzhou	160,217
Yufeng	Liuzhou	356,296
Liunan	Liuzhou	492,043
Liubei	Liuzhou	428,043
Liujiang	Liuzhou	562,351
Liucheng	Liuzhou	353,796
Luzhai	Liuzhou	421,019
Rong'an	Liuzhou	285,641
Rongshui	Liuzhou	402,054
Sanjiang	Liuzhou	297,244
Xiufeng	Guilin	103,984
Diecai	Guilin	136,142
Xiangshan	Guilin	224,492
Qixing	Guilin	175,061
Yanshan	Guilin	71,191
Lingui	Guilin	472,057
Yangshuo	Guilin	308,296
Lingchuan	Guilin	366,773
Quanzhou	Guilin	803,495
Xing'an	Guilin	354,924
Yongfu	Guilin	274,662
Guanyang	Guilin	280,284
Ziyuan	Guilin	170,413
Pingle	Guilin	418,501
Lipu	Guilin	374,169
Longsheng	Guilin	168,895
Gongcheng	Guilin	285,058
Wanxiu	Wuzhou	159,000
Changzhou	Wuzhou	148,100
Longxu	Wuzhou	303,118
Cangwu	Wuzhou	619,300
Teng(xian)	Wuzhou	1,036,900
Mengshan	Wuzhou	212,100
Cenxi	Wuzhou	903,000
Haicheng	Beihai	348,600
Yinhai	Beihai	176,800
Tieshangang	Beihai	142,700
Hepu	Beihai	871,200
Gangkou	Fangchenggang	155,200
Fangcheng	Fangchenggang	362,900
Shangsi	Fangchenggang	204,100
Dongxing	Fangchenggang	144,700
Qinnan	Qinzhou	613,000
Qinbei	Qinzhou	749,000
Lingshan	Qinzhou	1,557,800
Pubei	Qinzhou	871,400
Gangbei	Guigang	581,123
Gangnan	Guigang	628,917
Qintang	Guigang	563,241
Pingnan	Guigang	1,422,379
Guiping	Guigang	1,837,441
Yuzhou	Yulin	1,056,700
Fumian	Yulin	not established
Rong(xian)	Yulin	633,100
Luchuan	Yulin	762,400
Bobai	Yulin	1,342,500
Xingye	Yulin	560,400
Beiliu	Yulin	1,132,200
Youjiang	Baise	320,100
Tianyang	Baise	338,300
Tiandong	Baise	411,500
Pingguo	Baise	470,800
Debao	Baise	350,800
Jingxi	Baise	605,100
Napo	Baise	195,600
Lingyun	Baise	193,600
Leye	Baise	167,100
Tianlin	Baise	243,700
Xilin	Baise	151,200
Longlin	Baise	378,500
Babu	Hezhou	1,093,600
Pinggui	Hezhou	(not established)
Zhaoping	Hezhou	402,200
Zhongshan	Hezhou	423,300
Fuchuan	Hezhou	312,800
Jinchengjiang	Hechi	308,100
Yizhou	Hechi	628,600
Nandan	Hechi	291,400
Tian'e	Hechi	156,600
Fengshan	Hechi	195,700
Donglan	Hechi	295,500
Luocheng	Hechi	369,200
Huanjiang	Hechi	361,800
Bama	Hechi	266,700
Du'an	Hechi	672,000
Dahua	Hechi	446,200
Xingbin	Laibin	1,015,165
Xincheng	Laibin	405,384
Xiangzhou	Laibin	354,918
Wuxuan	Laibin	431,330
Jinxiu	Laibin	152,212
Heshan	Laibin	139,227
Jiangzhou	Chongzuo	347,800
Fusui	Chongzuo	432,000
Ningming	Chongzuo	412,300
Longzhou	Chongzuo	260,200
Daxin	Chongzuo	359,800
Tiandeng	Chongzuo	429,200
Pingxiang	Chongzuo	106,400
Dieshan (disestablished)	Wuzhou	194,900
