= Sanli =

Sanli may refer to:

== People ==
- Şanlı, Turkish surname
- Li Sanli (born 1935), Chinese computer scientist
- Ma Sanli (1914–2003), Chinese comedian

== Places ==
- Sanli, Nanling County, in Nanling County, Anhui
- Sanli, Guigang, in Qintang District, Guigang, Guangxi
- Sanli, Shanglin County, in Shanglin County, Guangxi
- Sanli, Wuxuan County, in Wuxuan County, Guangxi
- Sanli, Wuhan, in Huangpi District, Wuhan, Hubei
- Sanli, Lantian County, in Lantian County, Shaanxi
- Sanli, Bofan, in Bofan, Anlu, Xiaogan, Hubei

== Other ==
- Sanli, or San li 三礼 Three Ritual Classics - three classical Chinese texts on ritual (Zhouli, Yili, Liji)

== See also ==
- Sanlih
