= 港北区 =

港北区, meaning "district in the north of the port", may refer to:

- Gangbei District, district of the city of Guigang, Guangxi, People's Republic of China
- Kōhoku-ku, Yokohama, Kanagawa Prefecture, Japan

== See also ==
- Kohoku (disambiguation)
- 港南区 (disambiguation)
