= 港南区 =

港南区, meaning "district in the south of the port", may refer to:

- Gangnan District, district of Guigang, Guangxi, People's Republic of China
- Kōnan-ku, Yokohama, Kanagawa Prefecture, Japan

== See also ==
- Konan (disambiguation)
- 港北区 (disambiguation)
