= Airspace Industry Corporation of China =

Chinese aircraft company

Airspace Industry Corporation of China is a company registered in Hong Kong in 2012, with business ranging from airport equipment, aviation logistics, aircraft and aero-engine manufacturing to environmental technology, import and export trade since 2001.

The company has contracted with Antonov on 20 August 2016 to obtain technologies, drawings and property rights of An-225. They were planning to work with local governments to build factories for producing An-225 in Luzhou, Sichuan Province and Guigang, Guangxi Province. The company has drawn attention for this deal.
