= Kuiyang =

Kuiyang may refer to the following places in China:

- Kuiyang, Nanjing County, in Nanjing County, Fujian
- Kuiyang, Xingye County, in Xingye County, Guangxi

== See also ==
- Guiyang (disambiguation)
