= Guilin Christian Church =

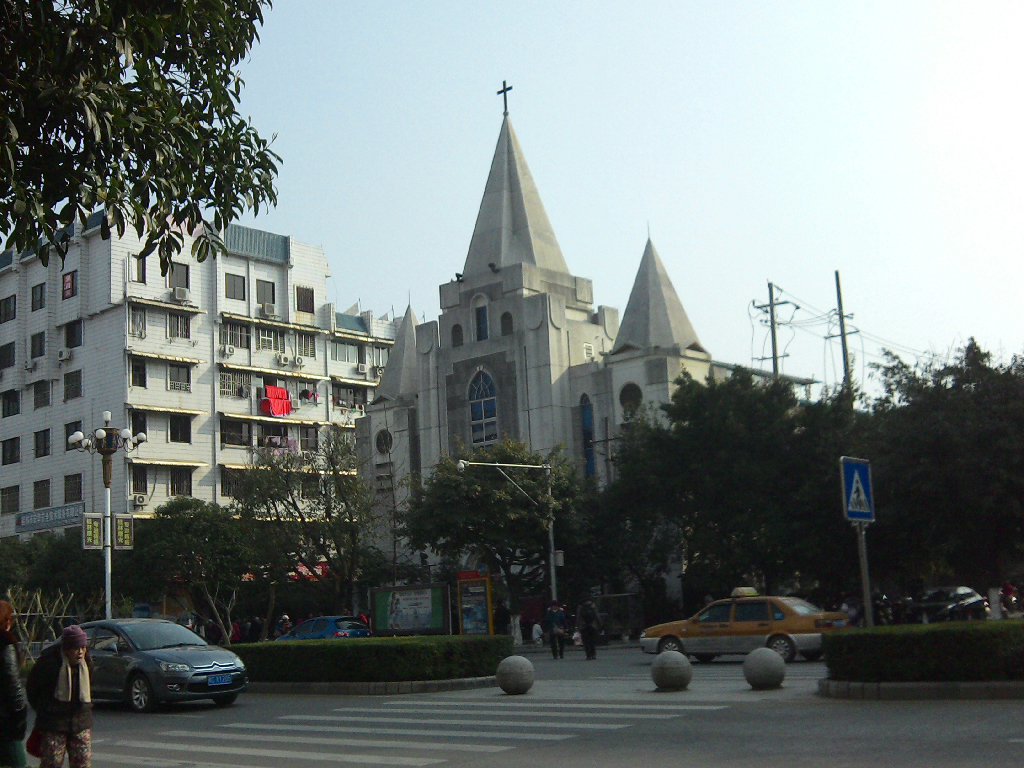
- Guilin Christian Church
- 25.2836353°N 110.2970046°E

Guilin Christian Church (Chinese: 桂林市基督教堂; pinyin: Guìlínshì Jīdūjiàotáng) is located on Zhongshan Middle Road, Xiufeng District, Guilin City, Guangxi Province, China. It is the seat of the Guilin Christian Three-Self Patriotic Movement Committee and the Guilin Christian Association. The church was formerly the Guilin Baptist Church established in 1912.

== History ==
In May 1912, the Southern Baptist Convention Foreign Mission Department established a church at No. 37 (formerly No. 185), Zhongshan Middle Road, Guilin. Then the church was completely destroyed during the Second Sino-Japanese War.

In 1945, after the War, Pastor Lu Deli presided over church affairs and rebuilt the buildings the following year, including the large auditorium, the small auditorium and a two-story house, with a construction area of about 1,000 square meters.

In 1951, after the founding of the People's Republic of China, the Guilin Christian Federation was established, including the Anglican Church, the Missionary Alliance, the Baptist Church, the Lutheran Church, the Taidong Theological Seminary, the Longzhu Road Church, the Daosheng Hospital, the Zion Hospital, the Christian Meeting House, and the Bible School of the Southwest Baptist Federation.

On March 17, 1955, the Federation was changed into the Guilin Three-Self Patriotic Movement committee, which borrowed the Baptist Church on Zhongshan Middle Road for its office. After the implementation of the Three-Self Reform and the "joint worship", there was only one joint "Guilin Christian Church" open in the city, at the location of the former Baptist Church.

During the Cultural Revolution (1966-1976), worship was suspended, and the church was occupied by the Red Star Printing Factory, and the pastoral staff were persecuted.

After the Cultural Revolution, the properties were returned to the church. On the Christmas Day of 1980, worship services were resumed at the church.

In 1994, due to the need for urban construction, the church was demolished and relocated to No. 456 (now No. 50) of Zhongshan Middle Road to build a new church. The inauguration ceremony of the new church was held on October 16. It was the largest Christian church in Guangxi Province at that time.

On May 27, 2012, the church celebrated its 100th anniversary after an interior renovation at the end of 2011.

== Architecture ==
Guilin Christian Church is located at No. 50 of Zhongshan Middle Road. It is in gothic style, with a land area of 1,309.9 square meters, a floor area of 747.4 square meters, and a building area of 1,828.5 square meters. The church can accommodate more than a thousand people worshipping at the same time.

The original Baptist church was built at No. 37 (previously 185), Zhongshan Middle Road. It has a big auditorium, a small auditorium and a two-story residence, with a construction area of about 1,000 square meters. The main auditorium was a three-story building with a vermilion door, above which inlaid the Chinese words "桂林市基督教会" (Guilin Christian Church).
