= Dongjin, Guangxi =

Dongjin 东津镇
- Town
- Interactive map of Dongjin
- Coordinates: 23°04′27″N 109°48′39″E
- Country: People's Republic of China
- Region: Guangxi
- Prefecture-level city: Guigang
- District: Gangnan
- Village-level divisions: 18 villages
- Elevation: 47 m (154 ft)
- Time zone: UTC+8 (China Standard)
- Postal code: 0775

Dongjin (simplified Chinese: 东津; traditional Chinese: 東津; pinyin: Dōngjīn; lit. 'east ford') is a town of Gangnan District, in the eastern suburbs of Guigang, Guangxi, People's Republic of China, located 22 kilometres (14 mi) from downtown Guigang. As of 2011, it has 18 villages under its administration.

== See also ==
- List of township-level divisions of Guangxi
