= Xiangxian =

Xiangxian may refer to the following places in China:

- Xiangxian, Guangxi (巷贤), a town in Shanglin County, Guangxi
- Xiangcheng County, Henan, formerly known as Xiangxian (襄縣), a county in Henan

== See also ==
- Xiangxiang, a city in Hunan, China
- Xianxian or Xian County, a county in Hebei, China
