= Guiyang (disambiguation) =

Guiyang is the capital of Guizhou Province, China.

Guiyang may also refer to:

- Roman Catholic Archdiocese of Guiyang, in Guiyang, Guizhou, China
- Guiyang County, in Chenzhou, Hunan, China
- Guiyang Commandery
- Guiyang school, one of the five major schools of Ch'an Buddhism

== See also ==
- Kuiyang (disambiguation)
