= Air Guilin =

Chinese airline

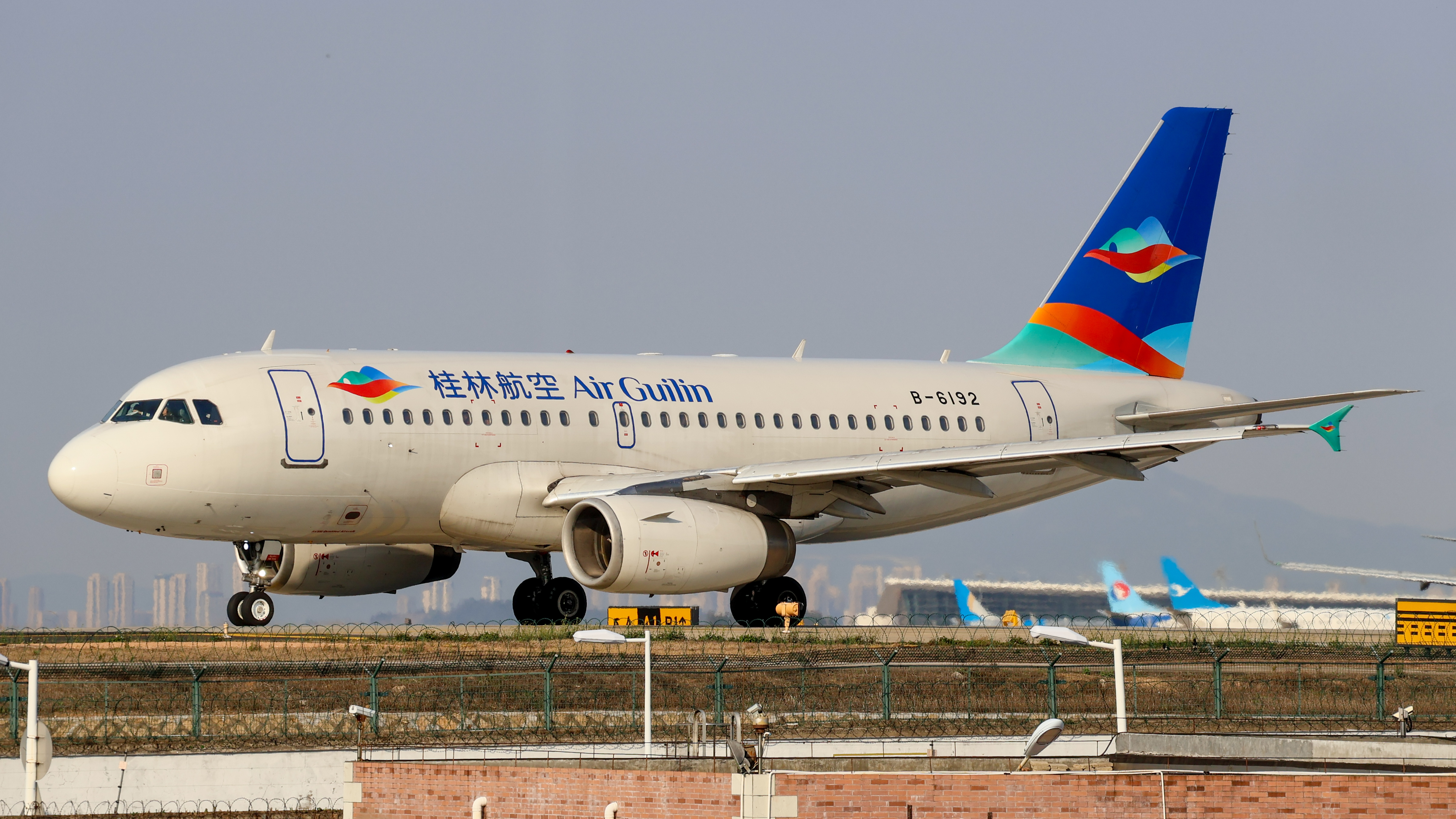
IATA	ICAO	Call sign
GT	CGH	WELKIN
- Founded: 2013; 13 years ago as Guangxi Airlines
- Commenced operations: 25 June 2016; 10 years ago
- Operating bases: Guilin Liangjiang International Airport
- Fleet size: 10
- Destinations: 22 (August 2017)
- Parent company: Guilin Transportation Investment Group
- Key people: Lin Yan, chairman and Rachel Ho, chairlady
- Website: www.airguilin.com

Air Guilin (Chinese: 桂林航空; pinyin: Guìlín Hángkōng) is a Chinese airline with its headquarters in Xiufeng District, Guilin, Guangxi, and with Guilin Liangjiang International Airport as its main base of flight operations. A joint venture between the Guilin Municipal Government and HNA Group, the airline began operations in June 2016 using Airbus A319 aircraft. It intends to boost the tourism industry in Guilin.

== History ==
Air Guilin has its origins in Guangxi Airlines, formed in 2013 by HNA Group and the Guilin Municipal Government. This airline was renamed Guilin Airlines in 2014 and planned to commence operations in May of that year, although this did not occur. On 8 September 2015, Guilin Airlines received preliminary approval from the CAAC. In October the airline decided to use Airbus A319 aircraft for its fleet.

Guilin Airlines was renamed Air Guilin in late 2015. On 9 December it unveiled its logo, which incorporates Guilin landmark Elephant Trunk Hill and the slogan of the city. Air Guilin commenced operations on 25 June 2016 with a flight between Guilin and Zhengzhou.

=== Flight deck invasion ===
On November 3, 2019, a Sina Weibo user found a photo of a woman dressed as a passenger in the cockpit of a civil airliner on Weibo. After preliminary identification, the details of the cockpit in the photo show that the passenger plane is en route in flight, while the paper cup on the cup holder shows that the passenger plane is suspected of belonging to Air Guilin. The next day, Air Guilin issued a statement confirming that the incident had happened on the GT1011 flight from Guilin to Yangzhou on January 4 of that year. After the investigation, the company decided to suspend the captain on duty for life, and the rest of the crew members would be suspended indefinitely and investigated further. Air Guilin Document No. 2019-618 "Notice on the Discipline of Air Guilin Passengers Responsible for Violations in Entering the Cockpit".

=== Dispute with HNA Aviation ===
In November 2023, Air Guilin, a subsidiary of HNA Aviation, was suspended due to shareholder disputes, and a large number of flights after November 3 were suspended and cancelled. According to a document of Hainan Airlines, from November 2, 2023, the affiliated enterprises of HNA Aviation will suspend the provision of aviation material supply, aviation maintenance, information system and other guarantee services for Guilin Airlines in accordance with the agreement.

HNA Aviation Group said that they are the actual controlling enterprise of Air Guilin, and "Guilin Airlines Tourism Group Co., Ltd. actually enjoys 100% equity in Guilin Airlines". Another shareholder of Guilin Airlines, Guilin Transportation Investment, a state-owned enterprise in Guilin, did not recognise the control of Hainan Airlines and upgraded its control over Air Guilin. The negotiation between the two parties failed, and finally HNA submitted a letter to Air Guilin to suspend service and terminate the agreement.

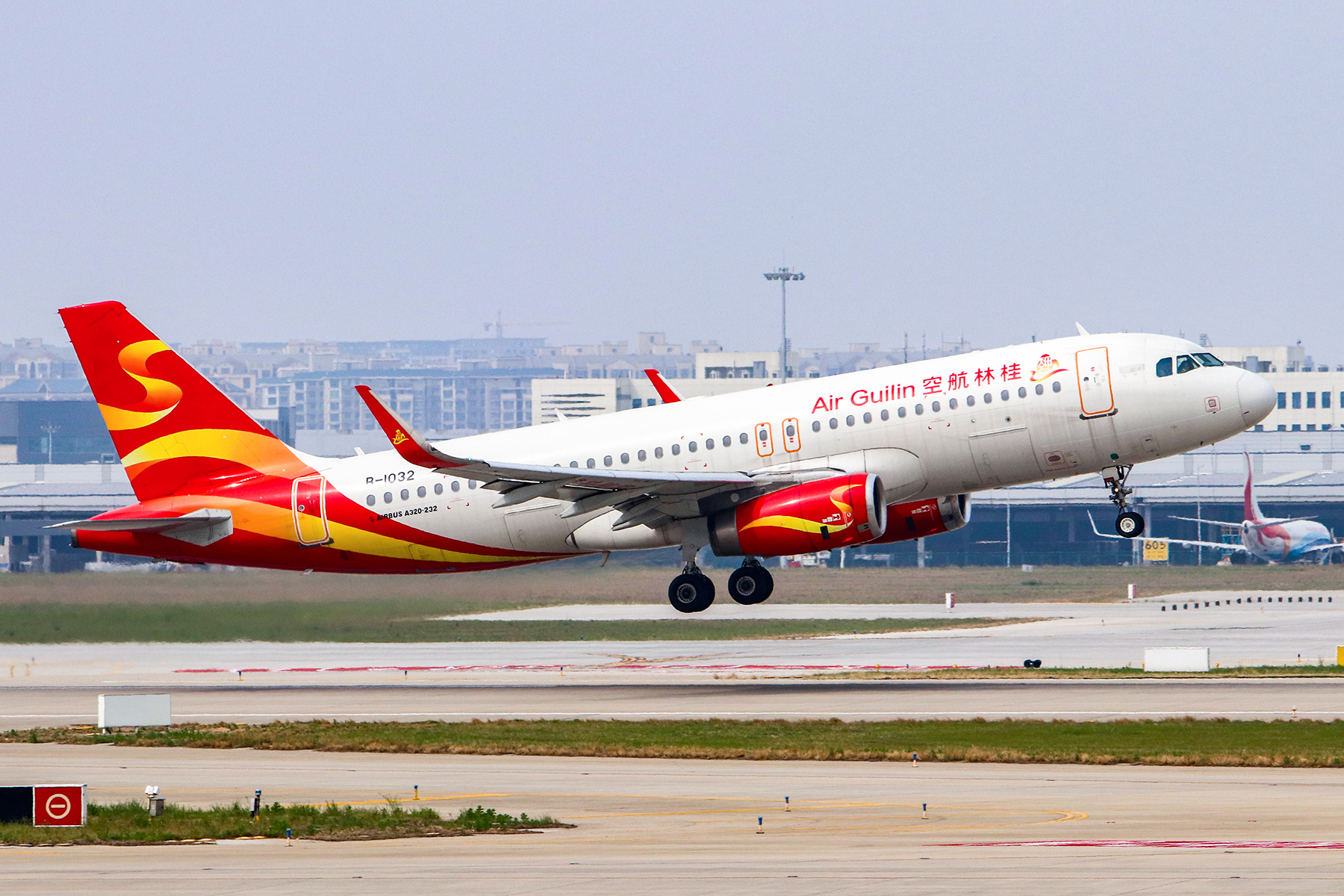
The HNA logo behind cockpit windows was removed after the resumption.

Previous logo

On February 1, 2024, Air Guilin announced the resumption of the route from Guilin to Tianjin. The operation software of another domestic airline was launched this time, but the ownership dispute has not been resolved. HNA Aviation issued an announcement that it did not participate in the resumption of Air Guilin. "Safety, service, operation, operation and other responsibilities have nothing to do with HNA Aviation." Guilin Transportation Investment Group said that Air Guilin has completed the upgrade of the maintenance system and operation system, and "does not belong to the bankrupt and reorganised HNA Aviation Group".

== Corporate affairs ==
Air Guilin is a joint venture between Guilin Tourism Development Co. (60%) and Guilin Aviation Tourism Group (40%), an HNA Group subsidiary. The groups have invested a total of ¥600 million in the airline.

== Destinations ==
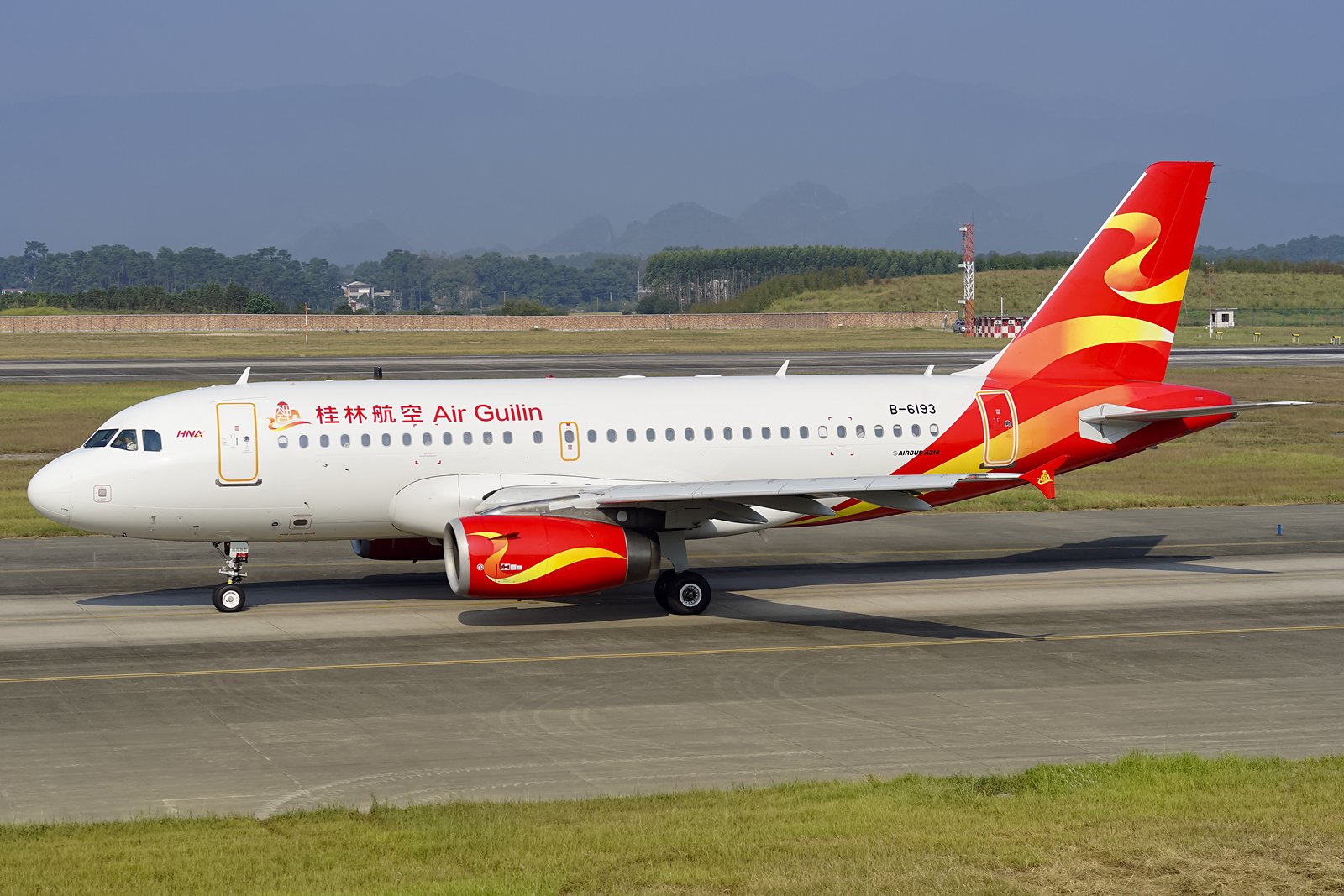
An Airbus A319 taxiing at Guilin Liangjiang International Airport

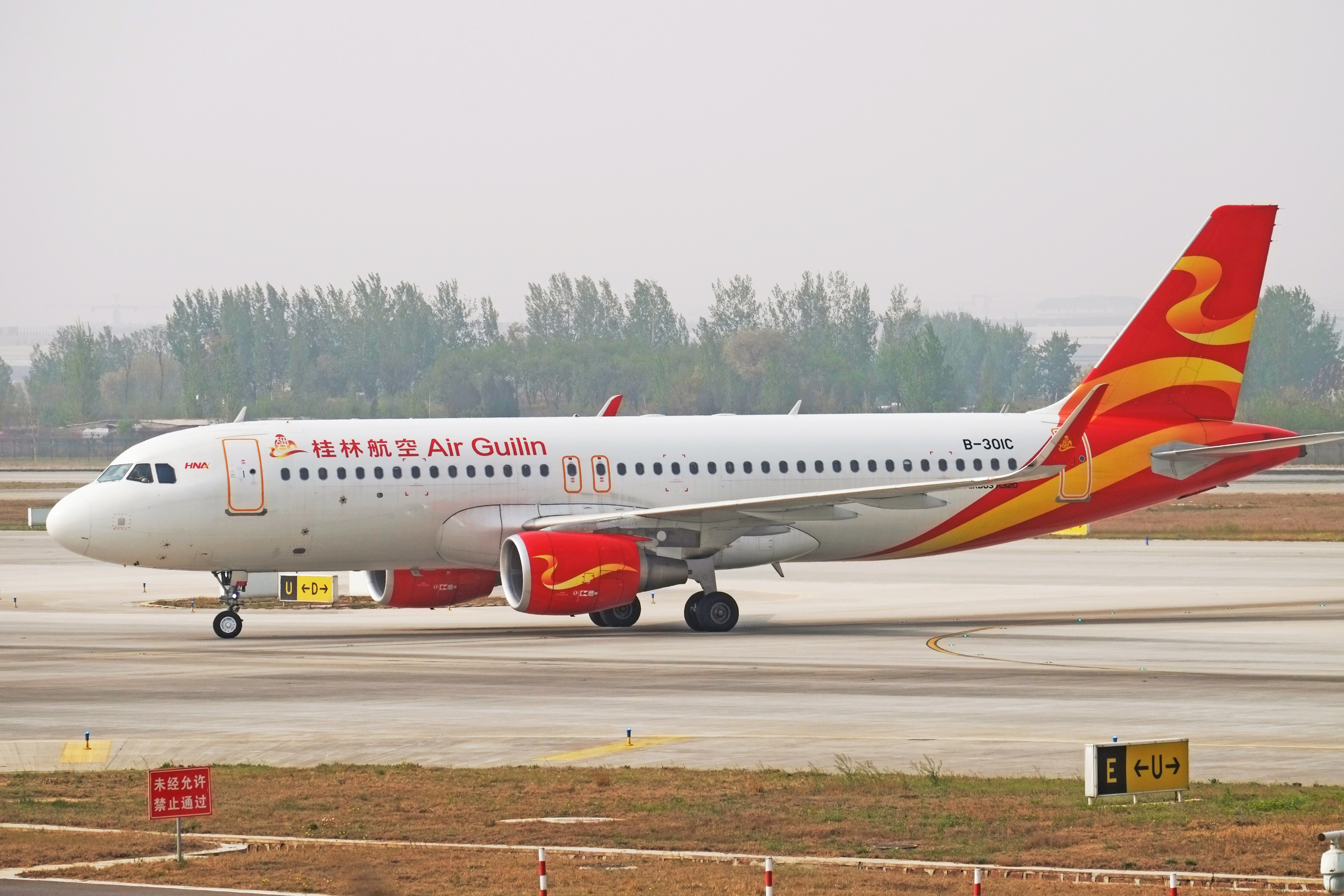
An Airbus A320 taxiing at Zhengzhou Xinzheng International Airport

Air Guilin flies to the following destinations in China as of May 2026:

Province	City	Airport	Notes
Anhui	Hefei	Hefei Xinqiao International Airport	
Anhui	Huangshan	Huangshan Tunxi International Airport	
Chongqing	Chongqing	Chongqing Jiangbei International Airport	
Guangxi	Beihai	Beihai Fucheng Airport	
Guangxi	Guilin	Guilin Liangjiang International Airport	Hub
Guangxi	Nanning	Nanning Wuxu International Airport	
Guizhou	Guiyang	Guiyang Longdongbao International Airport	
Hainan	Haikou	Haikou Meilan International Airport	
Hebei	Shijiazhuang	Shijiazhuang Zhengding International Airport	
Hebei	Tangshan	Tangshan Sannühe Airport	
Henan	Zhengzhou	Zhengzhou Xinzheng International Airport	
Hubei	Enshi	Enshi Xujiaping Airport	
Hubei	Yichang	Yichang Sanxia Airport	
Inner Mongolia	Hohhot	Hohhot Baita International Airport	
Jiangsu	Xuzhou	Xuzhou Guanyin Airport	
Jiangsu	Yangzhou	Yangzhou Taizhou Airport	
Jiangxi	Nanchang	Nanchang Changbei International Airport	
Jilin	Changchun	Changchun Longjia International Airport	
Liaoning	Dalian	Dalian Zhoushuizi International Airport	
Liaoning	Shenyang	Shenyang Taoxian International Airport	
Shandong	Jinan	Jinan Yaoqiang International Airport	
Shandong	Yantai	Yantai Penglai International Airport	
Shanxi	Datong	Datong Yungang Airport	
Shanxi	Taiyuan	Taiyuan Wusu Airport	
Xinjiang	Changji	Qitai Jiangbulake Airport	
Xinjiang	Korla	Korla Licheng Airport	
Zhejiang	Ningbo	Ningbo Lishe International Airport	

== Fleet ==
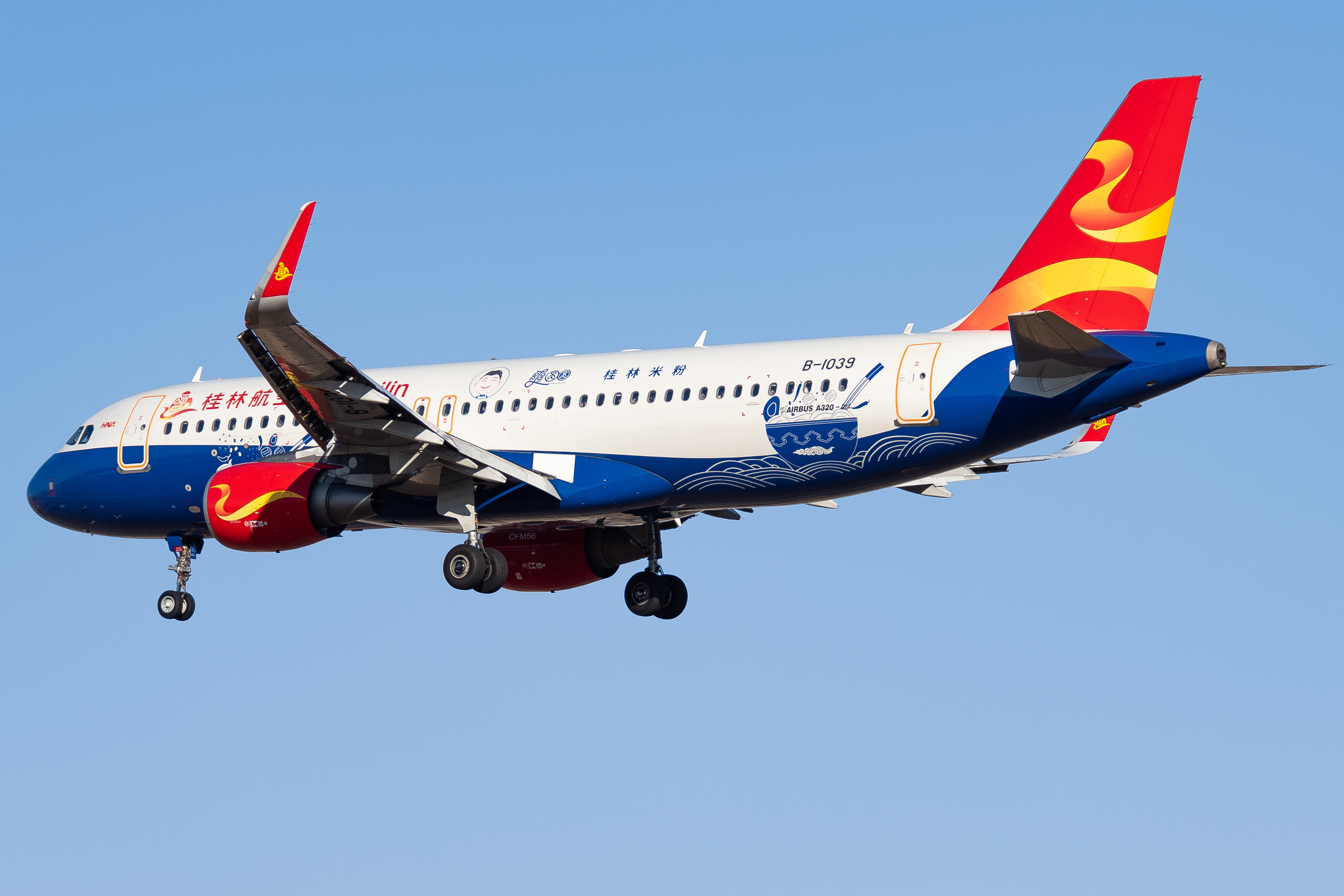
An Airbus A320 of Air Guilin in Guilin Rice Noodles livery

As of August 2025, Air Guilin operates the following aircraft:

Air Guilin Fleet
Aircraft	In service	Orders	Passengers	Notes
Airbus A319-100	2	—	138	
Airbus A320-200	8	—	180	
Total	10			
