= Liunan District =

Liunan 柳南区 · Liujnanz Gih
- District
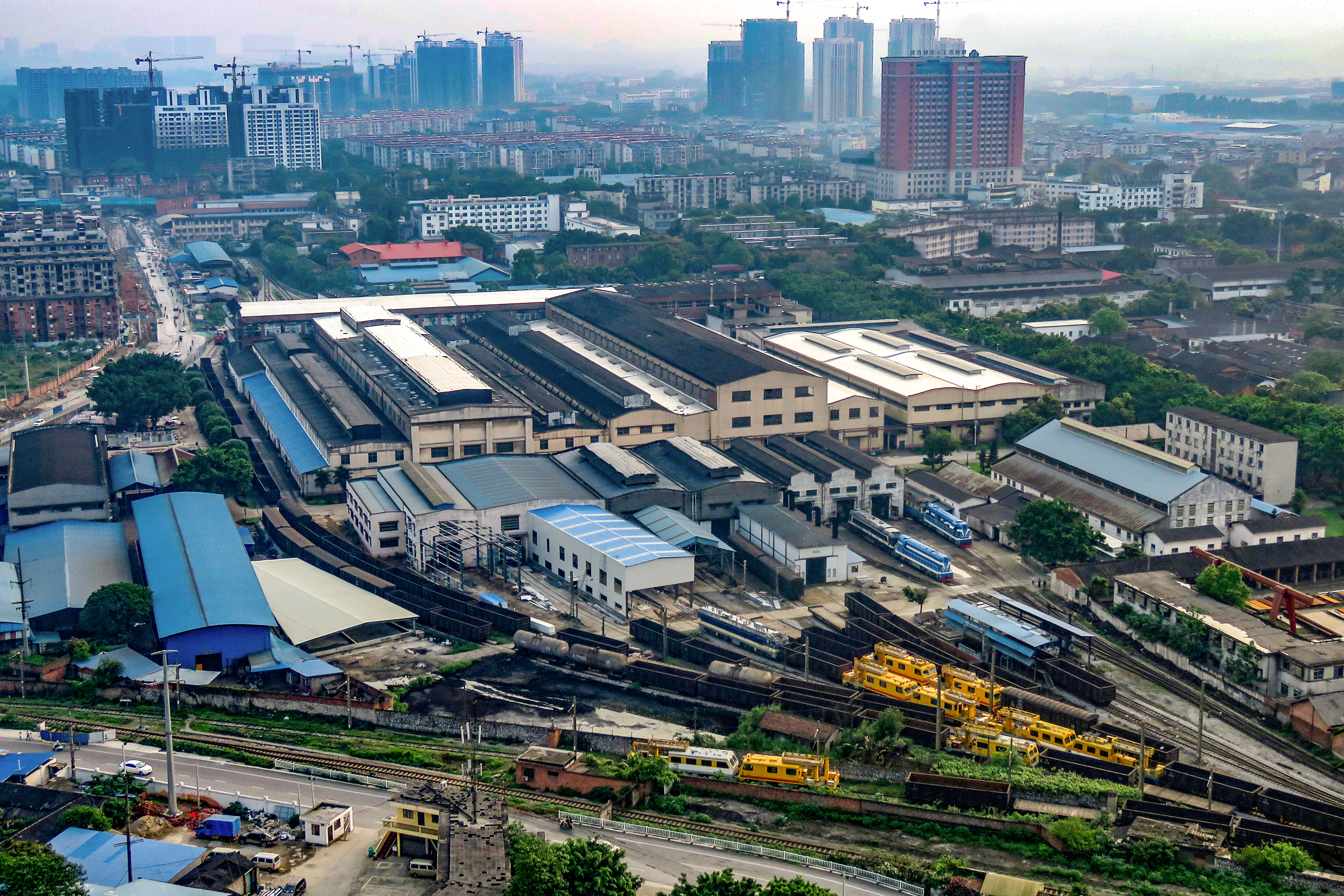
- Liuzhou Locomotive and Rolling Stock Corporation

- Location in Guangxi
- Coordinates: 24°20′12″N 109°22′42″E
- Country: China
- Autonomous region: Guangxi
- Prefecture-level city: Liuzhou
- District seat: Hexi

Area
  - Total: 162 km^{2} (63 sq mi)

Population (2010)
  - Total: 492,043
  - Density: 3,040/km^{2} (7,870/sq mi)
- Time zone: UTC+8 (China Standard)

Liunan District (simplified Chinese: 柳南区; traditional Chinese: 柳南區; pinyin: Liǔnán Qū; Standard Zhuang: Liujnanz Gih) is one of four districts of Liuzhou, Guangxi Zhuang Autonomous Region, China.

== Administrative divisions ==
Liunan District is divided into 8 subdistricts and 3 towns:

subdistricts

- Hexi 河西街道
- Nanzhan 南站街道
- Eshan 鹅山街道
- Liunan 柳南街道
- Liushi 柳石街道
- Yinshan 银山街道
- Tanxi 潭西街道
- Nanhuan 南环街道

towns

- Taiyangcun 太阳村镇
- Luoman 洛满镇
- Liushan 流山镇
