= Kohoku =

Kohoku may refer to:

- Kohoku, Shiga
- Kōhoku, Saga
- Kōhoku-ku, Yokohama
