= Yanshan District =

Yanshan 雁山区 · Yensanh Gih
- District
- Interactive map of Yanshan
- Coordinates: 25°06′07″N 110°17′13″E
- Country: China
- Province: Guangxi
- Prefecture-level city: Guilin
- District seat: Yanshan Town

Area
  - Total: 288 km^{2} (111 sq mi)
- Time zone: UTC+8 (China Standard)

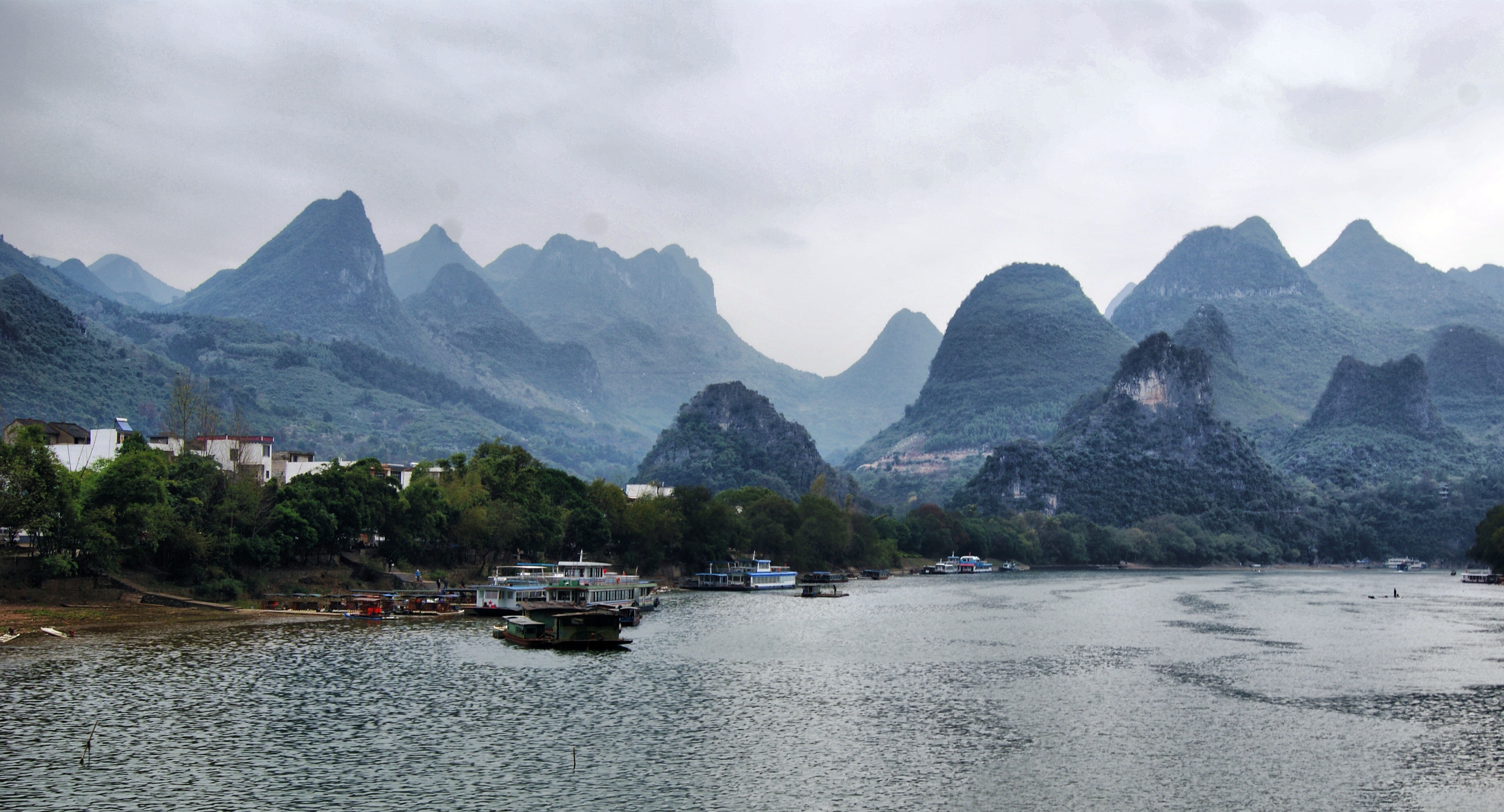
Yanshan, Guilin, Guangxi, China.

Yanshan District (Chinese: 雁山区; pinyin: Yànshān Qū; lit. 'Wild Goose Mountain'; Zhuang: Yensanh Gih) is a district covering part of the southern suburbs of Guilin, Guangxi, China.

== Administrative divisions ==
There is 1 subdistrict, 2 towns, 1 township, and 1 ethnic township in Yanshan District:

- Liangfeng Subdistrict (良丰街道)
- Yanshan Town (雁山镇)
- Zhemu Town (柘木镇)
- Dabu Township (大埠乡)
- Caoping Hui Ethnic Township (草坪回族乡)

== Climate ==
Climate data for Yanshan District, elevation 151 m (495 ft), (1991–2020 normals)
Month	Jan	Feb	Mar	Apr	May	Jun	Jul	Aug	Sep	Oct	Nov	Dec	Year
Mean daily maximum °C (°F)	12.2 (54.0)	14.8 (58.6)	18.0 (64.4)	24.1 (75.4)	28.2 (82.8)	30.7 (87.3)	33.0 (91.4)	33.3 (91.9)	31.1 (88.0)	26.7 (80.1)	21.3 (70.3)	15.4 (59.7)	24.1 (75.3)
Daily mean °C (°F)	8.3 (46.9)	10.8 (51.4)	14.0 (57.2)	19.7 (67.5)	23.7 (74.7)	26.5 (79.7)	28.1 (82.6)	27.9 (82.2)	25.6 (78.1)	21.0 (69.8)	15.6 (60.1)	10.2 (50.4)	19.3 (66.7)
Mean daily minimum °C (°F)	5.6 (42.1)	8.0 (46.4)	11.4 (52.5)	16.4 (61.5)	20.4 (68.7)	23.6 (74.5)	24.7 (76.5)	24.3 (75.7)	21.7 (71.1)	16.9 (62.4)	11.7 (53.1)	6.6 (43.9)	15.9 (60.7)
Average precipitation mm (inches)	78.0 (3.07)	78.2 (3.08)	146.9 (5.78)	205.4 (8.09)	326.8 (12.87)	397.1 (15.63)	225.8 (8.89)	160.2 (6.31)	75.4 (2.97)	60.8 (2.39)	74.4 (2.93)	54.3 (2.14)	1,883.3 (74.15)
Average precipitation days	14.2	14.4	19.5	18.4	18.6	18.8	16.8	13.6	9.1	7.3	9.2	10.1	170
Average snowy days	0.7	0.3	0	0	0	0	0	0	0	0	0	0.2	1.2
Average relative humidity (%)	77	78	82	82	83	85	82	81	77	74	75	74	79
Mean monthly sunshine hours	55.9	50.6	50.5	77.2	106.8	113.3	181.7	191.7	173.6	153.0	118.0	95.9	1,368.2
Percentage possible sunshine	17	16	14	20	26	28	44	48	48	43	36	29	31
Source: China Meteorological Administration

== Education ==
Yunnan Normal University operates Lijiang College on 250,000 square metres (2,700,000 sq ft) of space in Yanshan District. The university and Guangxi Yiqin trading Co.Ltd organized it in July 2001.
