= Rong'an County =

Rong'an County 融安县 · Yungz'anh Yen Jungan
- County
- Location in Guangxi
- Coordinates: 25°13′26″N 109°23′56″E
- Country: China
- Autonomous region: Guangxi
- Prefecture-level city: Liuzhou
- County seat: Chang'an

Area
  - Total: 2,904 km^{2} (1,121 sq mi)

Population (2010)
  - Total: 285,641
  - Density: 98.36/km^{2} (254.8/sq mi)
- Time zone: UTC+8 (China Standard)
- Postal code: 5454XX

Rong'an County (simplified Chinese: 融安县; traditional Chinese: 融安縣; pinyin: Róng'ān Xiàn; Standard Zhuang: Yungz'anh Yen) is under the administration of Liuzhou, Guangxi Zhuang Autonomous Region, China. It borders the prefecture-level city of Guilin to the east.

== Administrative divisions ==
Rong'an County is divided into 6 towns and 6 townships:

towns

- Chang'an 长安镇
- Fushi 浮石镇
- Sixiang 泗顶镇
- Banlan 板榄镇
- Dajiang 大将镇
- Daliang 大良镇

townships

- Yayao 雅瑶乡
- Dapo 大坡乡
- Dongqi 东起乡
- Shazi 沙子乡
- Banqiao 桥板乡
- Tantou 潭头乡

== Climate ==
Rong'an County has a typical Guangxi humid subtropical climate (Köppen Cfa) characterised by long, hot, humid and wet summers alongside short, pleasant (though extremely cloudy) and drier winters.

Climate data for Rong'an, elevation 162 m (531 ft), (1991–2020 normals, extremes 1951–2024)
Month	Jan	Feb	Mar	Apr	May	Jun	Jul	Aug	Sep	Oct	Nov	Dec	Year
Record high °C (°F)	25.9 (78.6)	30.0 (86.0)	35.1 (95.2)	35.7 (96.3)	34.9 (94.8)	37.0 (98.6)	40.2 (104.4)	40 (104)	37.5 (99.5)	35.5 (95.9)	31.2 (88.2)	27.0 (80.6)	40.2 (104.4)
Mean daily maximum °C (°F)	12.4 (54.3)	15.1 (59.2)	18.5 (65.3)	24.4 (75.9)	28.5 (83.3)	30.9 (87.6)	33 (91)	33.5 (92.3)	31.3 (88.3)	26.6 (79.9)	21.3 (70.3)	15.6 (60.1)	24.3 (75.6)
Daily mean °C (°F)	8.8 (47.8)	11.2 (52.2)	14.5 (58.1)	19.9 (67.8)	23.9 (75.0)	26.6 (79.9)	28.1 (82.6)	28.0 (82.4)	25.7 (78.3)	21.1 (70.0)	15.9 (60.6)	10.8 (51.4)	19.5 (67.2)
Mean daily minimum °C (°F)	6.3 (43.3)	8.6 (47.5)	11.9 (53.4)	16.8 (62.2)	20.6 (69.1)	23.7 (74.7)	24.9 (76.8)	24.5 (76.1)	21.9 (71.4)	17.6 (63.7)	12.5 (54.5)	7.7 (45.9)	16.4 (61.6)
Record low °C (°F)	−2.9 (26.8)	−1.9 (28.6)	−1.2 (29.8)	4.2 (39.6)	9.3 (48.7)	12.5 (54.5)	17.1 (62.8)	17.6 (63.7)	12.4 (54.3)	4.1 (39.4)	0.6 (33.1)	−3.7 (25.3)	−3.7 (25.3)
Average precipitation mm (inches)	67.3 (2.65)	73.4 (2.89)	127.4 (5.02)	177.7 (7.00)	303.3 (11.94)	470.4 (18.52)	287.8 (11.33)	164 (6.5)	86.5 (3.41)	63.7 (2.51)	81.7 (3.22)	50.8 (2.00)	1,954 (76.99)
Average precipitation days (≥ 0.1 mm)	13.7	13.0	19.1	17.9	18.2	19.3	16.8	14.1	8.9	8.1	10.0	9.8	168.9
Average snowy days	0.8	0.4	0	0	0	0	0	0	0	0	0	0.2	1.4
Average relative humidity (%)	76	77	81	81	81	84	81	79	77	74	76	73	78
Mean monthly sunshine hours	49.3	49.5	53.9	77.4	108.8	109.2	175.3	199.6	184.0	149.9	115.0	94.1	1,366
Percentage possible sunshine	15	15	14	20	26	27	42	50	50	42	35	29	30
Source: China Meteorological Administration
