= Şanlı =

Şanlı is a Turkish word often used as a surname. Notable people with the surname include:

- Koray Şanlı, Turkish footballer
- Sertaç Şanlı, Turkish basketball player
- Tuncay Şanlı, Turkish footballer

== See also ==
- Şanlı, Silvan
