= Fumian District =

Fumian 福绵区
- District
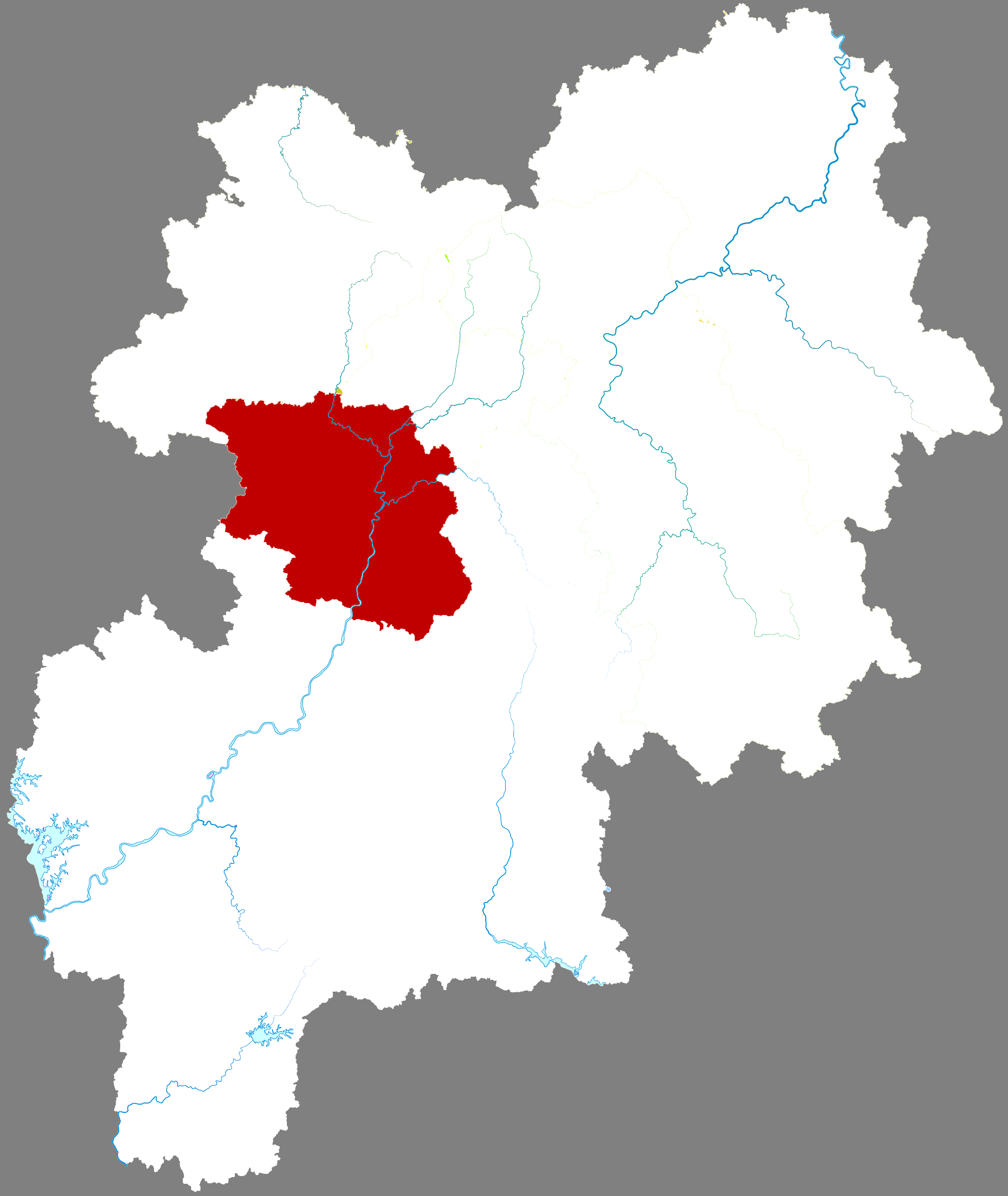
- Location of Fumian district

- Location in Guangxi
- Coordinates: 22.585°N 110.059°E
- Country: China
- Autonomous region: Guangxi
- Prefecture-level city: Yulin

Area
  - Total: 787 km^{2} (304 sq mi)

Population
  - Total: 397,000
  - Density: 504/km^{2} (1,310/sq mi)
- Time zone: UTC+8 (China Standard Time)
- Website: www.ylfm.gov.cn

Fumian District (simplified Chinese: 福绵区; traditional Chinese: 福綿區; pinyin: Fúmián Qū) is a district of the prefecture-level city of Yulin in Guangxi Zhuang Autonomous Region, China. It governs an area of 787 square kilometres (304 sq mi) and has a population of 397,000. It is the largest base for clothing manufacturing in Guangxi, and claims to be the "trousers capital of the world". In 2010 its total GDP was 4.56 billion yuan.

== Administrative divisions ==
Fumian District is divided into six towns, which are further divided into 116 administrative villages:

- Fumian (福绵)
- Chengjun (成均)
- Zhangmu (樟木)
- Xinqiao (新桥)
- Shatian (沙田)
- Shihe (石和)
