= Long'an County =

Long'an County 隆安县 · Lungzanh Yen Lungan
- County
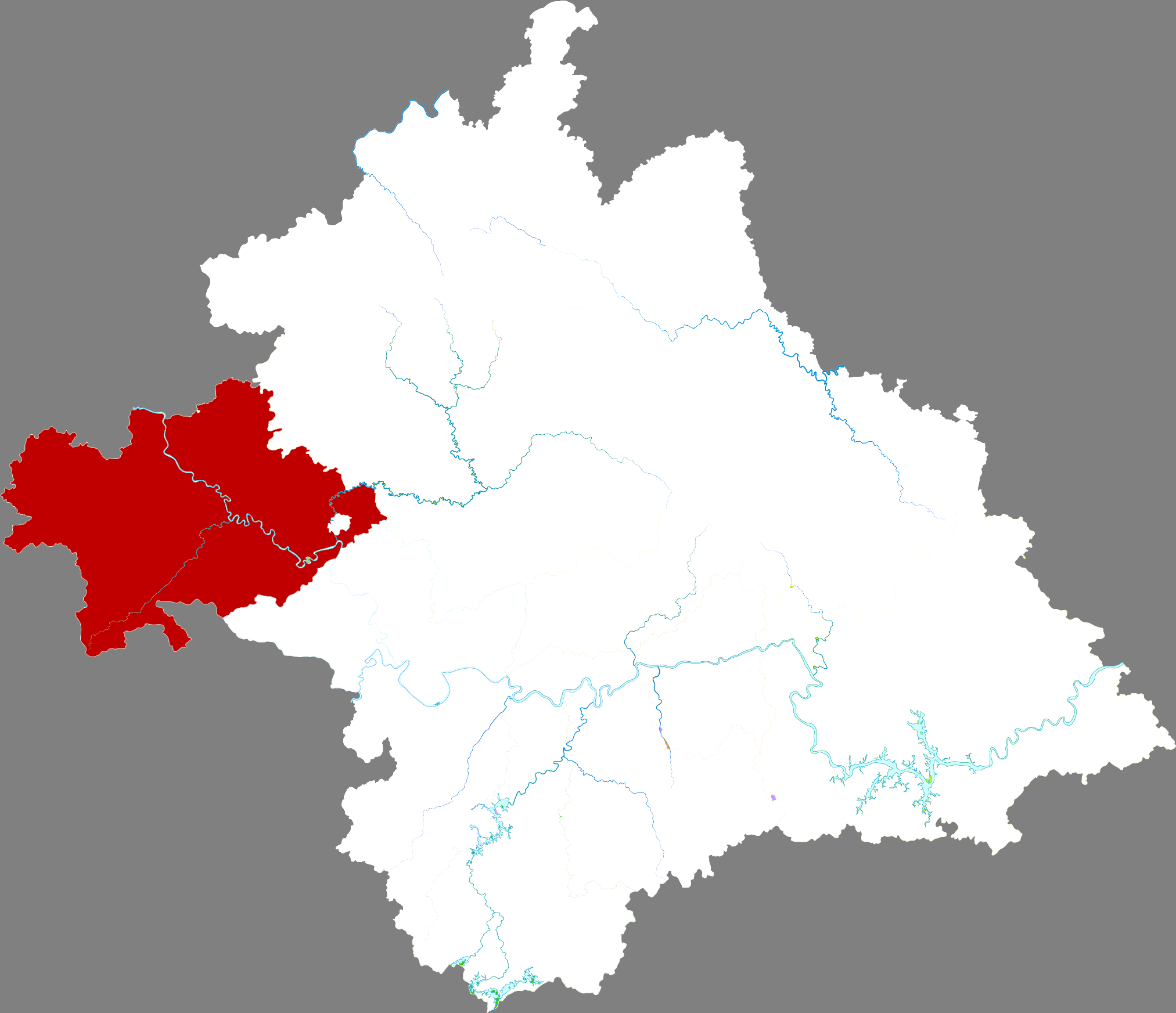
- Location in Nanning

- Location in Guangxi
- Coordinates: 23°09′58″N 107°41′46″E
- Country: China
- Autonomous region: Guangxi
- Prefecture-level city: Nanning
- County seat: Chengxiang

Area
  - Total: 2,264.7 km^{2} (874.4 sq mi)

Population (2010)
  - Total: 300,215
  - Density: 132.56/km^{2} (343.34/sq mi)
- Time zone: UTC+8 (China Standard)
- Postal code: 5327XX

Long'an County (simplified Chinese: 隆安县; traditional Chinese: 隆安縣; pinyin: Lóng'ān Xiàn; Standard Zhuang: Lungzanh Yen) is a county of Guangxi Zhuang Autonomous Region, South China, it is under the administration of the prefecture-level city of Nanning, the capital of Guangxi. The westernmost county-level division of Nanning, it borders the prefecture-level cities of Chongzuo to the west and Baise to the northwest.

== Administrative divisions ==
Long'an County is divided into 6 towns and 4 townships:

towns

- Chengxiang 城厢镇
- Nanxu 南圩镇
- Yanjiang 雁江镇
- Natong 那桐镇
- Qiaojian 乔建镇
- Dingdang 丁当镇

townships

- Gutan 古潭乡
- Dujie 都结乡
- Buquan 布泉乡
- Pingshan 屏山乡

== Climate ==
Climate data for Long'an, elevation 126 m (413 ft), (1991−2020 normals, extremes 1981–present)
Month	Jan	Feb	Mar	Apr	May	Jun	Jul	Aug	Sep	Oct	Nov	Dec	Year
Record high °C (°F)	30.5 (86.9)	35.8 (96.4)	36.7 (98.1)	39.2 (102.6)	39.7 (103.5)	37.9 (100.2)	39.0 (102.2)	38.5 (101.3)	38.5 (101.3)	36.3 (97.3)	34.7 (94.5)	31.6 (88.9)	39.7 (103.5)
Mean daily maximum °C (°F)	17.1 (62.8)	19.4 (66.9)	22.1 (71.8)	27.6 (81.7)	30.9 (87.6)	32.3 (90.1)	33.0 (91.4)	33.1 (91.6)	31.9 (89.4)	28.7 (83.7)	24.5 (76.1)	19.7 (67.5)	26.7 (80.1)
Daily mean °C (°F)	13.2 (55.8)	15.3 (59.5)	18.2 (64.8)	23.1 (73.6)	26.2 (79.2)	27.8 (82.0)	28.2 (82.8)	28.0 (82.4)	26.5 (79.7)	23.3 (73.9)	19.2 (66.6)	14.7 (58.5)	22.0 (71.6)
Mean daily minimum °C (°F)	10.5 (50.9)	12.5 (54.5)	15.6 (60.1)	20.0 (68.0)	22.8 (73.0)	24.8 (76.6)	25.2 (77.4)	24.9 (76.8)	23.2 (73.8)	19.8 (67.6)	15.7 (60.3)	11.5 (52.7)	18.9 (66.0)
Record low °C (°F)	1.1 (34.0)	1.0 (33.8)	3.7 (38.7)	9.7 (49.5)	14.2 (57.6)	16.3 (61.3)	20.2 (68.4)	21.3 (70.3)	15.9 (60.6)	9.3 (48.7)	3.6 (38.5)	0.1 (32.2)	0.1 (32.2)
Average precipitation mm (inches)	40.6 (1.60)	29.5 (1.16)	58.3 (2.30)	66.2 (2.61)	159.7 (6.29)	224.9 (8.85)	212.7 (8.37)	193.1 (7.60)	106.6 (4.20)	74.8 (2.94)	41.9 (1.65)	32.7 (1.29)	1,241 (48.86)
Average precipitation days (≥ 0.1 mm)	10	9.3	13.1	11.8	13.5	16.5	17.0	15.2	9.5	7.0	6.8	6.5	136.2
Average snowy days	0.1	0	0	0	0	0	0	0	0	0	0	0	0.1
Average relative humidity (%)	77	77	80	78	79	83	83	83	81	78	78	75	79
Mean monthly sunshine hours	64.7	63.5	60.0	106.4	155.4	160.7	194.6	203.3	190.6	169.7	135.5	112.5	1,616.9
Percentage possible sunshine	19	20	16	28	38	40	47	51	52	48	41	34	36
Source: China Meteorological Administration all-time October record
