= Qinnan District =

Qinnan 钦南区 · Ginhnanz Gih
- District
- Location in Guangxi
- Coordinates: 21°56′20″N 108°39′25″E
- Country: China
- Autonomous region: Guangxi
- Prefecture-level city: Qinzhou
- District seat: Shuidong Subdistrict

Area
  - Total: 1,972 km^{2} (761 sq mi)

Population (2020 census)
  - Total: 679,692
  - Density: 344.7/km^{2} (892.7/sq mi)
- Time zone: UTC+8 (China Standard)
- Website: www.gxqn.gov.cn

Qinnan District (simplified Chinese: 钦南区; traditional Chinese: 欽南區; pinyin: Qīnnán Qū) is a district of the city of Qinzhou, Guangxi, China.

== Administrative divisions ==
Qinnan District is divided into 5 subdistricts and 11 towns:

- Xiangyang Subdistrict (向阳街道)
- Shuidong Subdistrict (水东街道)
- Wenfeng Subdistrict (文峰街道)
- Nanzhu Subdistrict (南珠街道)
- Jianshan Subdistrict (尖山街道)
- Shafu Town (沙埠镇)
- Kangxiling Town (康熙岭镇)
- Huangwutun Town (黄屋屯镇)
- Dafanpo Town (大番坡镇)
- Longmengang Town (龙门港镇)
- Jiulong Town (久隆镇)
- Dongchang Town (东场镇)
- Nali Town (那丽镇)
- Napeng Town (那彭镇)
- Nasi Town (那思镇)
- Xiniujiao Town (犀牛脚镇)
