= Longxu District =

Longxu 龙圩区 · Lungzhih Gih
- District
- Location in Guangxi
- Coordinates: 23.415°N 111.247°E
- Country: China
- Autonomous region: Guangxi
- Prefecture-level city: Wuzhou
- District seat: Longxu Town

Area
  - Total: 971.41 km^{2} (375.06 sq mi)
- Time zone: UTC+8 (China Standard Time)

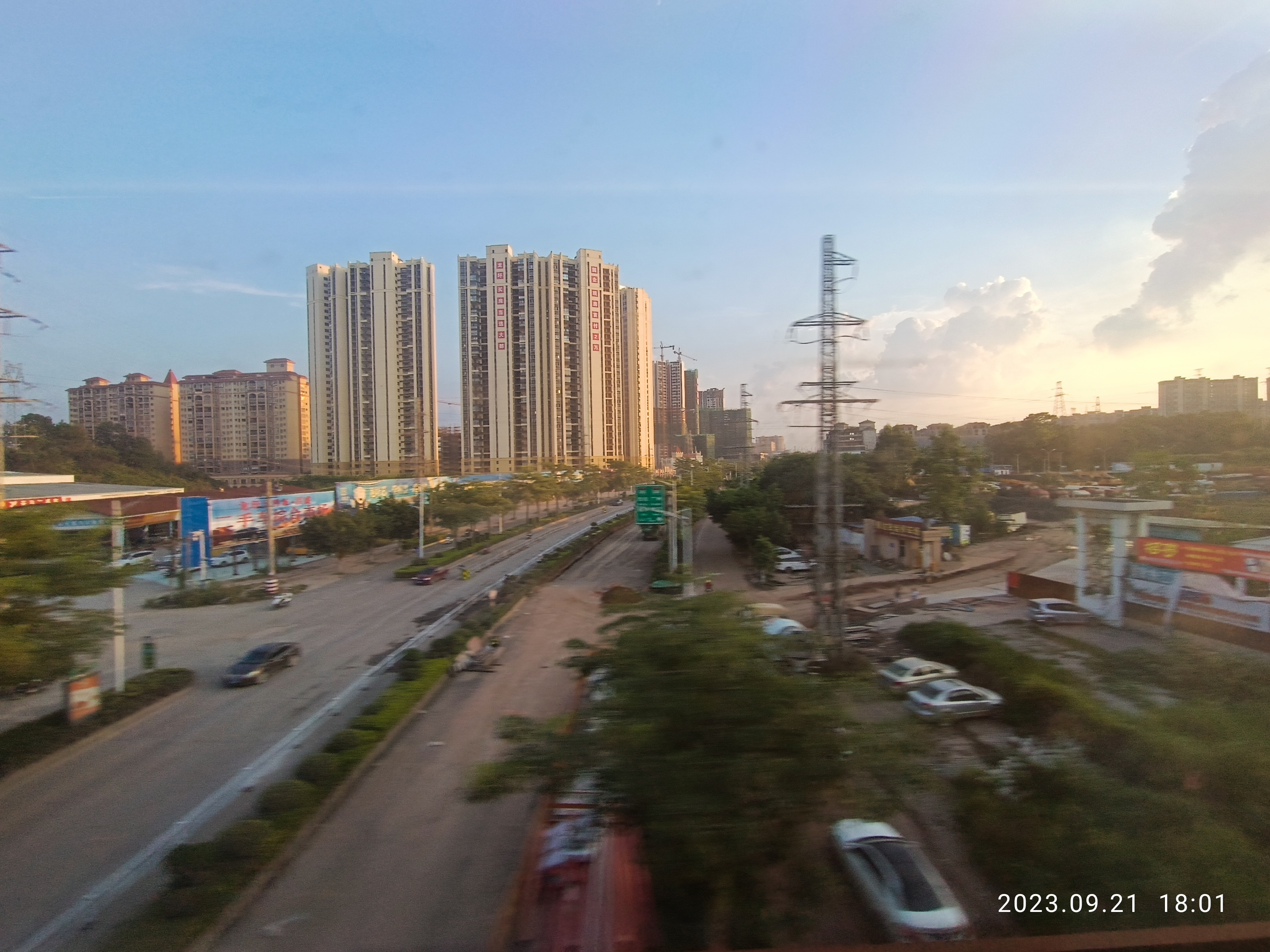

Longxu District (simplified Chinese: 龙圩区; traditional Chinese: 龍圩區; pinyin: Lóngxū Qū; Zhuang: Lungzhih Gih) is a district of the prefecture-level city of Wuzhou in Guangxi Zhuang Autonomous Region, China. It was created in March 2013 by splitting off four towns from Cangwu County. It is named after the district seat Longxu Town, which was formerly the seat of Cangwu County. Cangwu's seat was moved to Shiqiao Town after the 2013 administrative restructuring.

== Administrative divisions ==
Longxu District is divided into four towns: Longxu (龙圩), Xindi (新地), Guangping (广平), and Dapo (大坡).
