= Gangbei District =

Gangbei 港北区 • Gangjbwz Gih
- District
- Location of the seat in Guangxi
- Country: China
- Province: Guangxi
- Prefecture-level city: Guigang
- District seat: Guicheng Subdistrict

Area
  - Total: 808 km^{2} (312 sq mi)

Population (2020 census)
  - Total: 760,633
  - Density: 941/km^{2} (2,440/sq mi)
- Time zone: UTC+8 (China Standard)
- Website: www.gbq.gov.cn

Gangbei (Chinese: 港北; pinyin: Gǎngběi; Zhuang: Gangjbwz) is a district of the city of Guigang, Guangxi, China.

== Administrative divisions ==
Gangbei District is divided into 2 subdistricts, 2 towns and 4 townships:

- Guicheng Subdistrict (贵城街道)
- Gangcheng Subdistrict (港城街道)
- Daxu Town (大圩镇)
- Qingfeng Town (庆丰镇)
- Genzhu Town (根竹镇)
- Wule Town (武乐镇)
- Qishi Township (奇石乡)
- Zhongli Township (中里乡)
