= Gangnan District =

Gangnan 港南区
- District
- Interactive map of Gangnan
- Coordinates: 23°04′30″N 109°36′04″E
- Country: China
- Region: Guangxi
- Prefecture-level city: Guigang
- District seat: Jiangnan Subdistrict

Area
  - Total: 1,225 km^{2} (473 sq mi)
- Elevation: 48 m (157 ft)

Population (2002)
  - Total: 580,000
  - Density: 470/km^{2} (1,200/sq mi)
- Time zone: UTC+8 (China Standard)
- Postal code: 537130
- Area code: 0775

Gangnan (Chinese: 港南; pinyin: Gǎngnán; lit. 'harbour (Guigang) south') is a district of Guigang, Guangxi, China, covering part of the southern portion of the city.

== Administrative divisions ==
There is 2 subdistrict and 7 towns in the district:

Subdistricts: Jiangnan (江南街道), Jiangnan (八塘街道).

Towns: Qiaoxu (桥圩镇), Muge (木格镇), Muzi (木梓镇), Zhanjiang (湛江镇), Dongjin (东津镇), Batang (八塘镇), Xintang (新塘镇), Watang (瓦塘镇)
