= Xiufeng District =

Xiufeng 秀峰区 · Siufungh Gih
- District
- Location in Guangxi
- Coordinates: 25°16′26″N 110°15′50″E
- Country: China
- Autonomous region: Guangxi
- Prefecture-level city: Guilin
- District seat: Jiashan Subdistrict

Area
  - Total: 49 km^{2} (19 sq mi)
- Time zone: UTC+8 (China Standard)

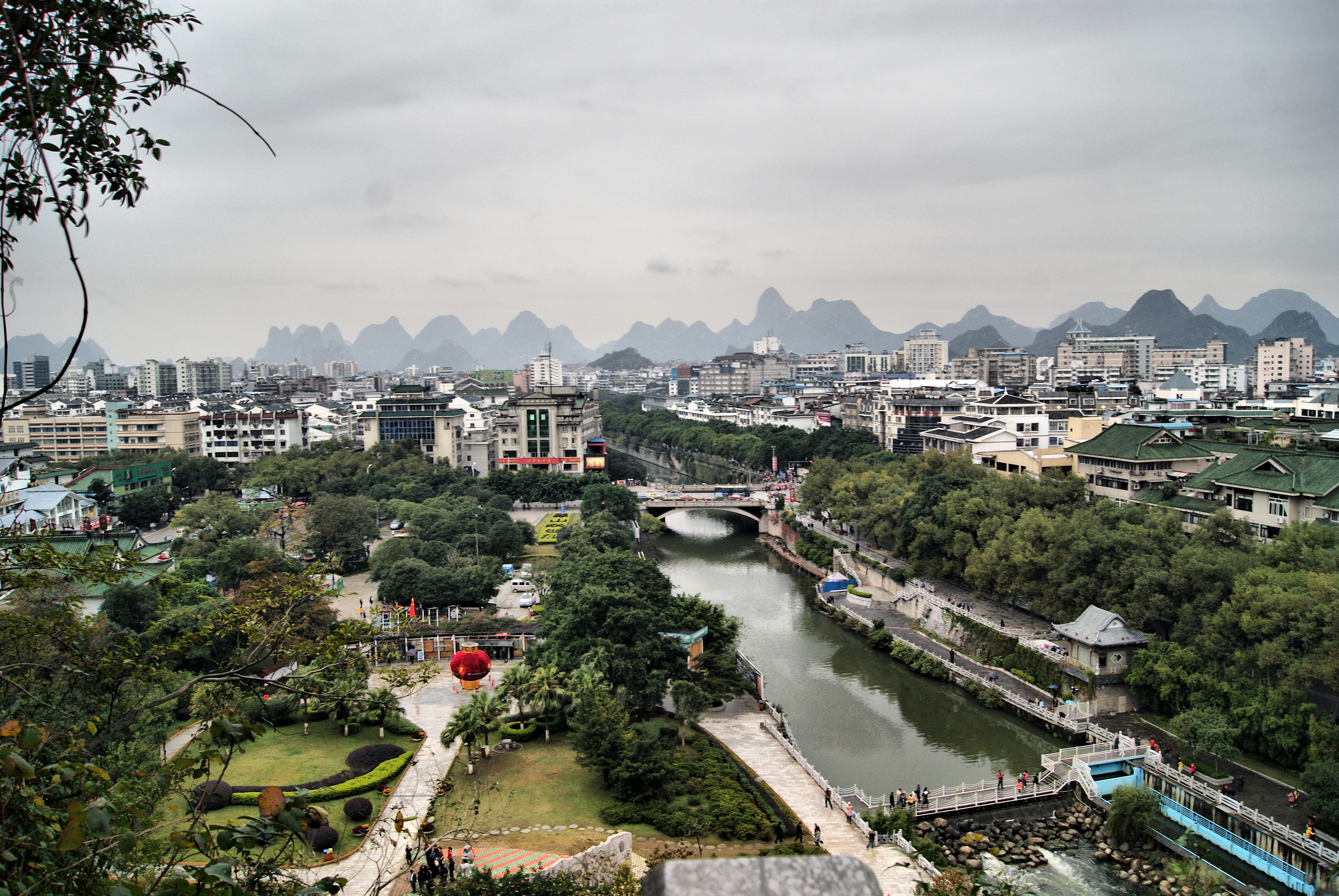
Panoramic view of Xiufeng

Xiufeng District (Chinese: 秀峰区; pinyin: Xiùfēng Qū; Zhuang: Siufungh Gih) is a district of the city of Guilin, Guangxi, China.

Air Guilin has its headquarters in Xiufeng District.

== Administrative divisions ==
Xiufeng District is divided into 3 subdistricts:

- Xiufeng Subdistrict (秀峰街道)
- Lijun Subdistrict (丽君街道)
- Jiashan Subdistrict (甲山街道)
