= Xingye County =

Xingye County 兴业县 · Hinghyez Yen Hingyeh
- County
- Location of the seat in Guangxi
- Coordinates: 22°44′10″N 109°52′30″E
- Country: China
- Province: Guangxi
- Prefecture-level city: Yulin
- County seat: Shinan

Area
  - Total: 1,486.7 km^{2} (574.0 sq mi)

Population (2020)
  - Total: 508,344
  - Density: 341.93/km^{2} (885.59/sq mi)
- Time zone: UTC+8 (China Standard)

Xingye County (simplified Chinese: 兴业县; traditional Chinese: 興業縣; pinyin: Xīngyè Xiàn; Zhuang: Hinghyez Yen) is a county in the southeast of Guangxi, China. It is under the administration of the prefecture-level city of Yulin.

== Administrative divisions ==
Xingye County is divided into 13 towns:

- Shinan 石南镇
- Dapingshan 大平山镇
- Kuiyang 葵阳镇
- Chenghuang 城隍镇
- Shanxin 山心镇
- Shatang 沙塘镇
- Putang 蒲塘镇
- Beishi 北市镇
- Long'an 龙安镇
- Gaofeng 高峰镇
- Xiaopingshan 小平山镇
- Maijiu 卖酒镇
- Luoyang 洛阳镇

== Tourism ==
- Longquan Rock Scenic Area (龙泉岩风景区)
- Yanshan Lake Scenic Area (燕山湖风景区)
- Shiyi Tower (石嶷文塔)

== Special local products ==
- Xingye Tribute Pothos (兴业贡柑)
- Cheng Huang Suanliao (城隍酸料)
