= Qintang District =

District of the city of Guigang

Qintang 覃塘区 · Cinzdangz Gih
- District
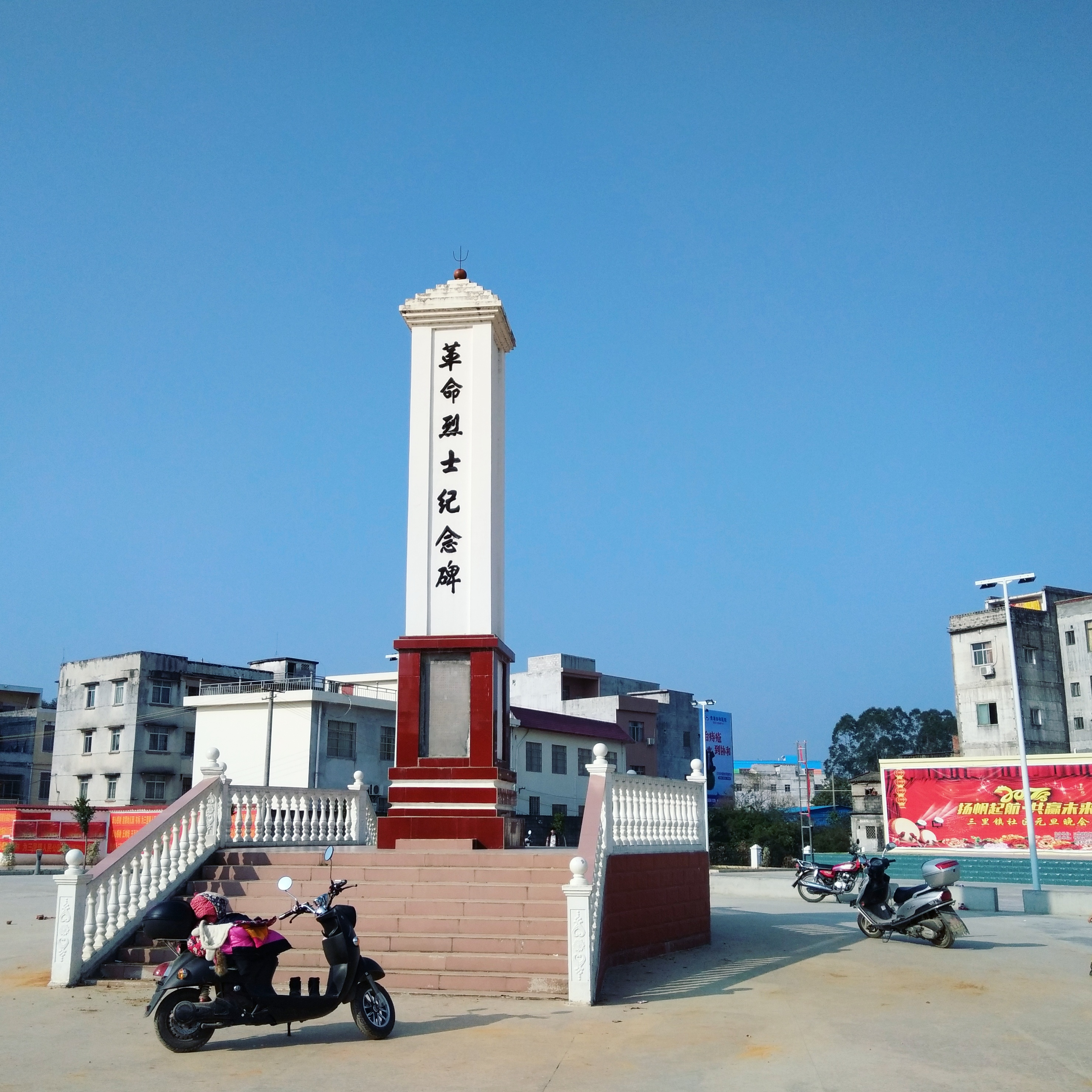

- Location in Guangxi
- Coordinates: 23°07′37″N 109°27′11″E
- Country: China
- Autonomous region: Guangxi
- Prefecture-level city: Guigang
- District seat: Qintang Subdistrict

Area
  - Total: 1,502 km^{2} (580 sq mi)

Population (2020)
  - Total: 423,747
  - Density: 282.1/km^{2} (730.7/sq mi)
- Time zone: UTC+8 (China Standard)
- Postal code: 537100

Qintang District (Chinese: 覃塘区; pinyin: Qíntáng Qū; Zhuang: Cinzdangz Gih) is a district of the city of Guigang, Guangxi, China.

== Population ==
According to census 2020, Qintang District has a population of 423,747.

== Administrative divisions ==
Qintang District is divided into 1 subdistrict, 7 towns and 2 townships:

subdistrict

- Qintang 覃塘街道

towns

- Donglong 东龙镇
- Sanli 三里镇
- Huanglian 黄练镇
- Shika 石卡镇
- Wuli 五里镇
- Zhangmu 樟木镇
- Menggong 蒙公镇

townships

- Shanbei 山北乡
- Daling 大岭乡
