= Shanglin County =

Shanglin County 上林县 · Sanglinz Yen
- County
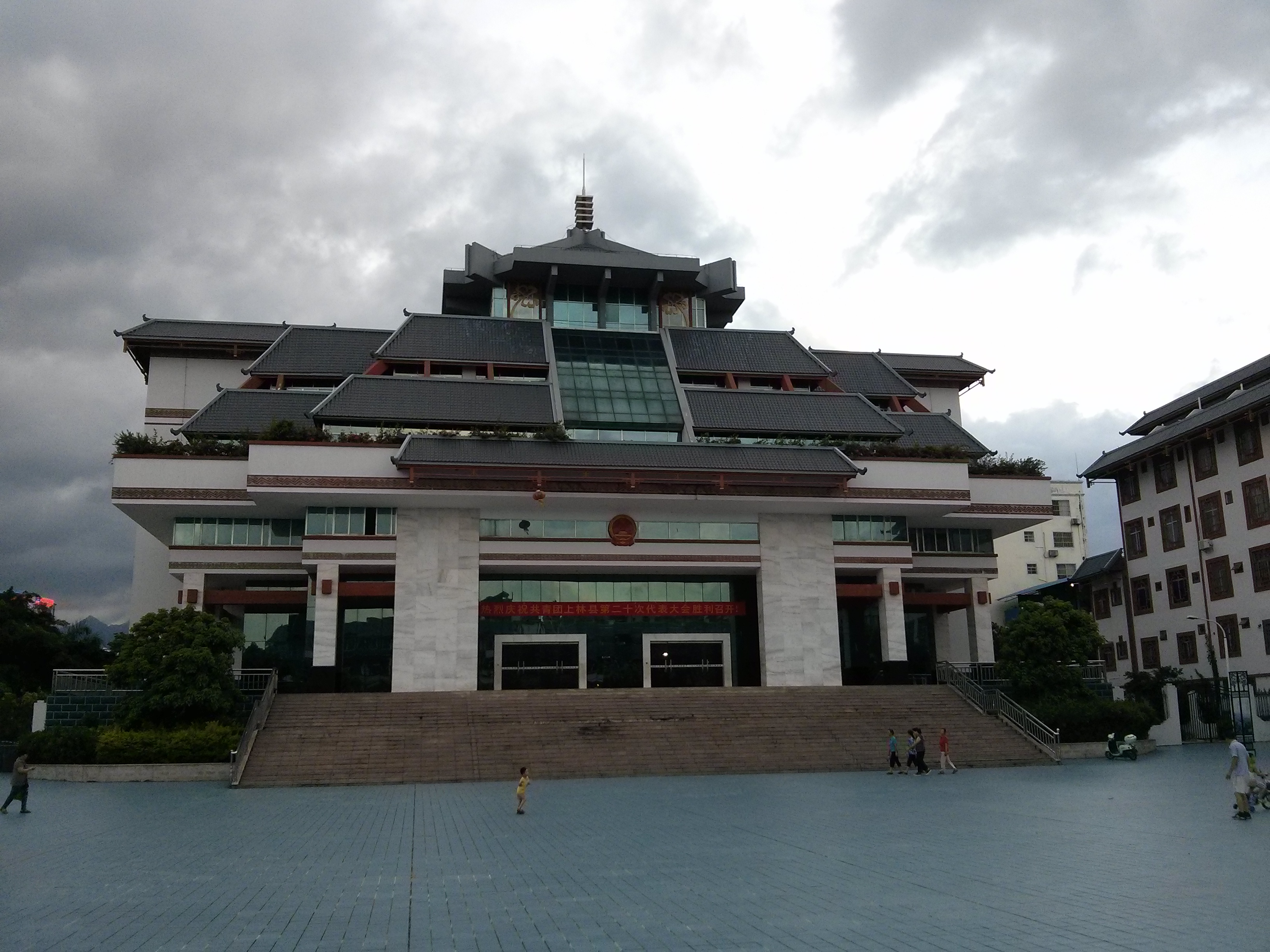

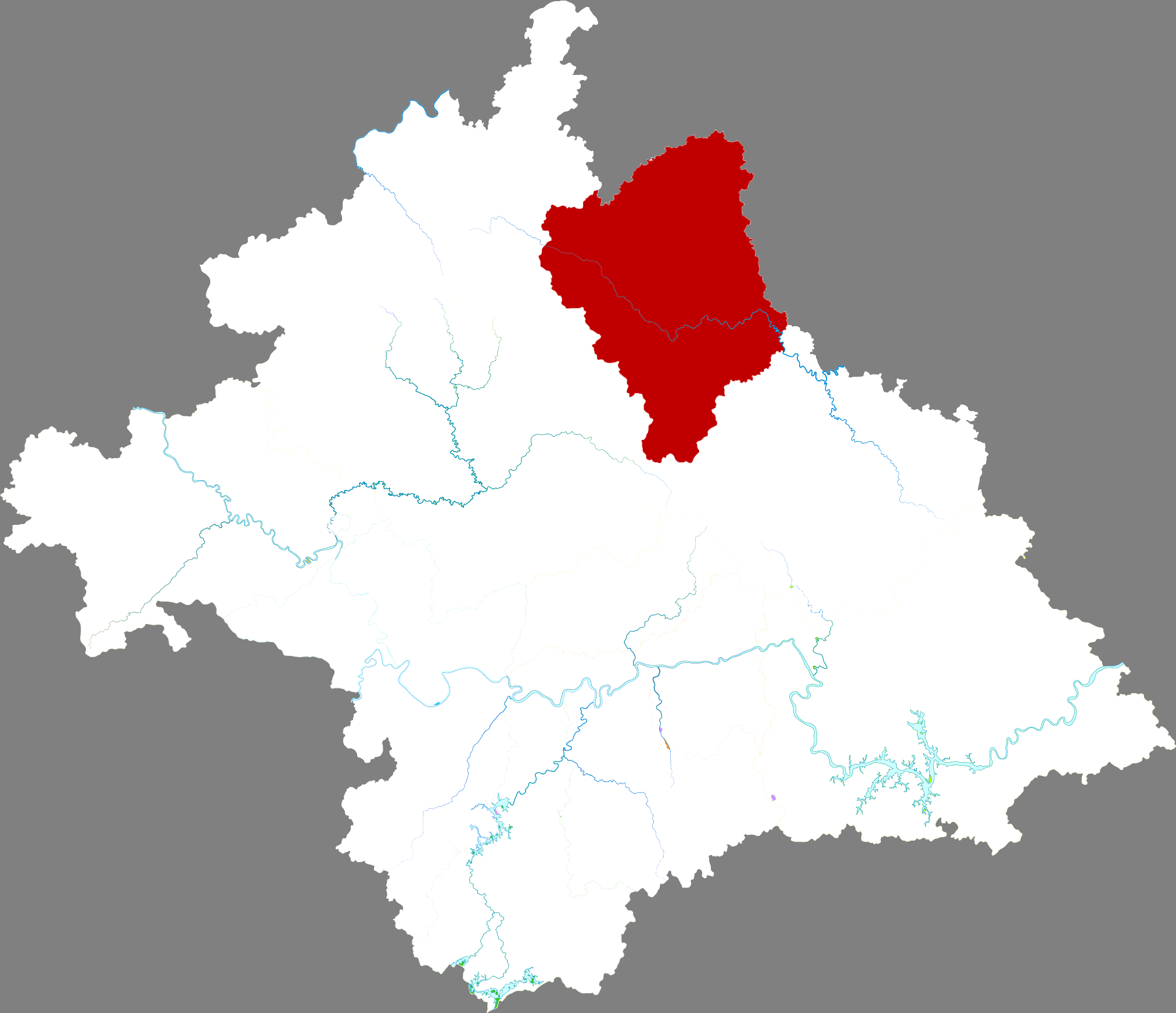
- Location in Nanning

- Location in Guangxi
- Coordinates: 23°25′55″N 108°36′11″E
- Country: China
- Autonomous region: Guangxi
- Prefecture-level city: Nanning
- County seat: Dafeng

Area
  - Total: 1,876 km^{2} (724 sq mi)

Population (2010)
  - Total: 343,590
  - Density: 183.2/km^{2} (474.4/sq mi)
- Time zone: UTC+8 (China Standard)
- Postal code: 5305XX

Shanglin County (simplified Chinese: 上林县; traditional Chinese: 上林縣; pinyin: Shànglín Xiàn; Standard Zhuang: Sanglinz Yen) is a county of Guangxi Zhuang Autonomous Region, China, it is under the administration of the prefecture-level city of Nanning, the capital of Guangxi. It borders the prefecture-level city of Laibin to the northeast.

== Administrative divisions ==
Shanglin County is divided into 7 towns, 3 townships and 1 ethnic township:

towns

- Dafeng Town 大丰镇
- Mingliang Town 明亮镇
- Xiangxian Town 巷贤镇
- Baixu Town 白圩镇
- Sanli Town 三里镇
- Qiaoxian Town 乔贤镇
- Xiyan Town 西燕镇

townships

- Chengtai Township 澄泰乡
- Mushan Township 木山乡
- Tanghong Township 塘红乡

ethnic township

- Zhenxu Yao Ethnic Township 镇圩瑶族乡

== Climate ==
Climate data for Shanglin, elevation 140 m (460 ft), (1991–2020 normals, extremes 1981–2010)
Month	Jan	Feb	Mar	Apr	May	Jun	Jul	Aug	Sep	Oct	Nov	Dec	Year
Record high °C (°F)	27.5 (81.5)	34.4 (93.9)	35.5 (95.9)	37.7 (99.9)	37.8 (100.0)	37.3 (99.1)	39.1 (102.4)	38.4 (101.1)	38.1 (100.6)	35.8 (96.4)	32.4 (90.3)	29.9 (85.8)	39.1 (102.4)
Mean daily maximum °C (°F)	15.7 (60.3)	17.9 (64.2)	20.6 (69.1)	26.2 (79.2)	29.7 (85.5)	31.5 (88.7)	32.6 (90.7)	32.8 (91.0)	31.3 (88.3)	28.0 (82.4)	23.6 (74.5)	18.4 (65.1)	25.7 (78.3)
Daily mean °C (°F)	11.8 (53.2)	14.0 (57.2)	17.0 (62.6)	22.1 (71.8)	25.3 (77.5)	27.2 (81.0)	27.9 (82.2)	27.9 (82.2)	26.1 (79.0)	22.6 (72.7)	18.2 (64.8)	13.4 (56.1)	21.1 (70.0)
Mean daily minimum °C (°F)	9.1 (48.4)	11.3 (52.3)	14.4 (57.9)	19.1 (66.4)	22.2 (72.0)	24.4 (75.9)	24.9 (76.8)	24.7 (76.5)	22.8 (73.0)	19.1 (66.4)	14.7 (58.5)	10.1 (50.2)	18.1 (64.5)
Record low °C (°F)	0.6 (33.1)	0.5 (32.9)	2.6 (36.7)	8.2 (46.8)	13.4 (56.1)	16.2 (61.2)	20.3 (68.5)	20.2 (68.4)	14.9 (58.8)	8.8 (47.8)	3.1 (37.6)	0.0 (32.0)	0.0 (32.0)
Average precipitation mm (inches)	76.4 (3.01)	52.5 (2.07)	112.0 (4.41)	121.3 (4.78)	245.3 (9.66)	278.1 (10.95)	273.8 (10.78)	227.8 (8.97)	127.0 (5.00)	78.8 (3.10)	71.6 (2.82)	50.2 (1.98)	1,714.8 (67.53)
Average precipitation days (≥ 0.1 mm)	13.1	12.6	17.9	15.1	17.0	20.5	18.7	16.5	10.8	7.7	8.7	9.2	167.8
Average snowy days	0.1	0	0	0	0	0	0	0	0	0	0	0	0.1
Average relative humidity (%)	80	80	83	82	83	86	85	84	82	79	78	77	82
Mean monthly sunshine hours	62.8	59.6	57.2	95.3	129.1	129.2	169.4	183.1	173.0	158.3	124.5	112.1	1,453.6
Percentage possible sunshine	19	19	15	25	31	32	41	46	47	44	38	34	33
Source: China Meteorological Administration

== Gold mining ==
Shanglin County has a longstanding tradition of gold mining, with deposits concentrated in three of its towns. This legacy has shaped not only the local economy but also patterns of international migration. Beginning in 2006, large numbers of Shanglin residents began traveling to Ghana to engage in small-scale gold mining. At its peak before 2013, the Shanglin migrant mining population in Ghana alone exceeded 12,000.

Following a crackdown on illegal mining launched by Ghanaian authorities in 2013, many Shanglin miners left the country, while others relocated to countries such as Mali, Togo, and the Democratic Republic of the Congo. By 2020, the COVID-19 pandemic further disrupted outbound migration, and the number of Shanglin miners across Africa fell to an estimated 10,000.

These mining ventures are typically financed and coordinated through robust social networks based on shared hometown ties. Shanglin miners often operate in informal or artisanal mining sectors, assuming roles such as mine owners, foremen, or technicians. Local African partners typically provide access to land and assist with obtaining permits, in exchange for rent or a share of profits. Over time, the boundary between worker and investor is fluid: successful workers may establish their own operations, while former mine owners may return to wage labor to recover from losses.
