= Guigang =

Guigang 贵港市 • Gveigangj Si Kweikang
- Prefecture-level city
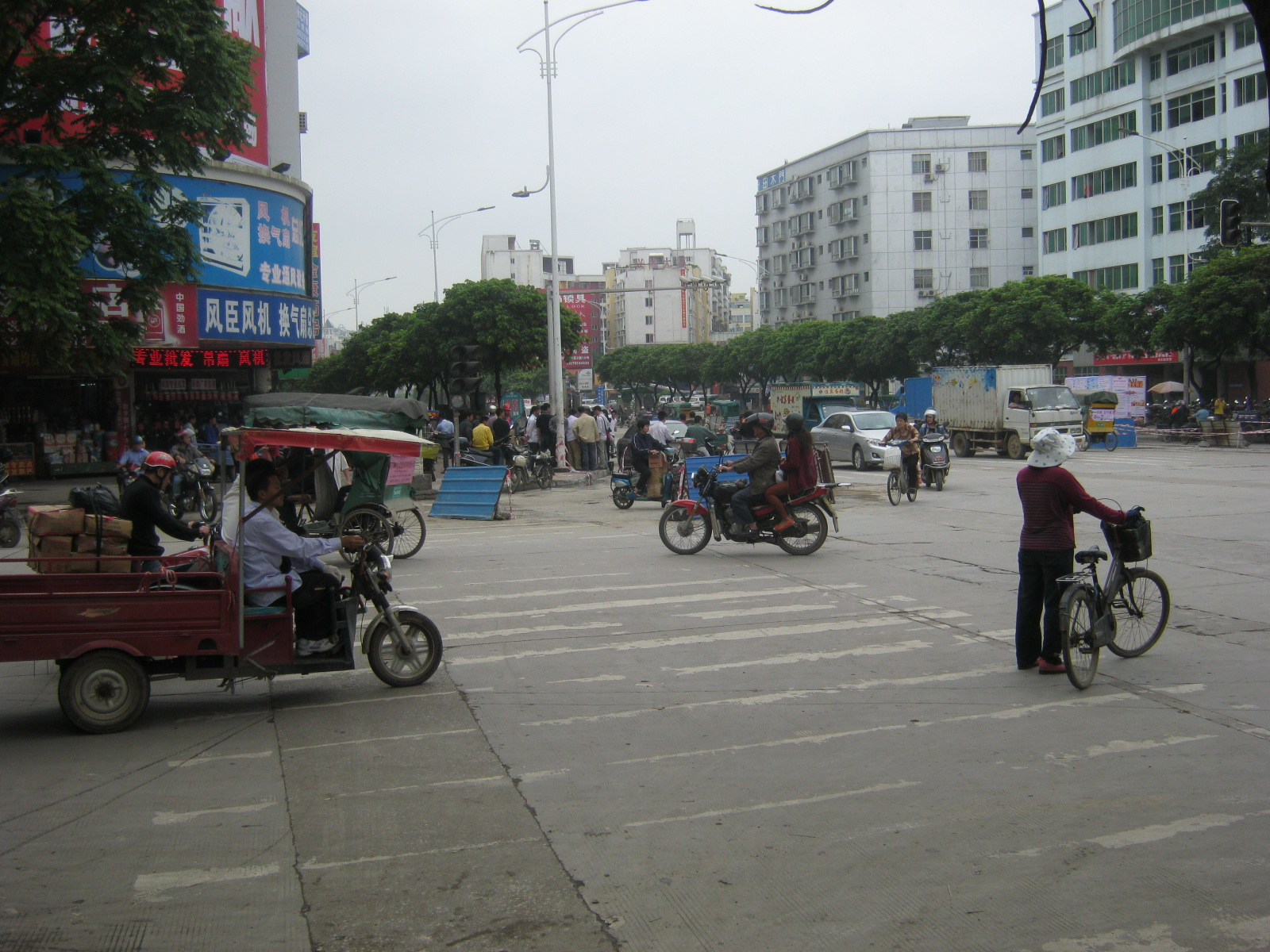
- Guigang in 2013. Jiefang Road (解放路)

- Location of Guigang City jurisdiction in Guangxi

- Location in China
- Coordinates (Guigang municipal government): 23°06′43″N 109°35′56″E
- Country: People's Republic of China
- Autonomous region: Guangxi
- Municipal seat: Gangbei District

Area
  - Prefecture-level city: 10,601 km^{2} (4,093 sq mi)
  - Urban: 3,546 km^{2} (1,369 sq mi)
  - Metro: 2,196 km^{2} (848 sq mi)
- Elevation: 45 m (148 ft)

Population (2020 census)
  - Prefecture-level city: 4,316,262
  - Density: 407.16/km^{2} (1,054.5/sq mi)
  - Urban: 1,700,978
  - Urban density: 479.7/km^{2} (1,242/sq mi)
  - Metro: 1,277,231
  - Metro density: 581.6/km^{2} (1,506/sq mi)

GDP
  - Prefecture-level city: CN¥ 150.2 billion US$ 23.3 billion
  - Per capita: CN¥ 34,632; US$ 5,368
- Time zone: UTC+8 (China Standard)
- Postal code: 537100
- Area code: 0775
- ISO 3166 code: CN-GX-08
- Licence plate prefixes: 桂R
- Website: www.gxgg.gov.cn

Guigang (simplified Chinese: 贵港; traditional Chinese: 貴港; pinyin: Guìgǎng; lit. 'Distinguished Harbour'; Zhuang: Gveigangj) is a prefecture-level city in eastern Guangxi in the People's Republic of China. Prior to 1988, it was known as Gui County or Guixian (simplified Chinese: 贵县; traditional Chinese: 貴縣; pinyin: Guìxiàn).

== Geography and climate ==
Guigang is located in eastern Guangxi. It is located between Guangxi's five major cities: Nanning, Guilin, Liuzhou, Beihai, and Wuzhou. Its location makes it a major transportation and business hub, connecting central China with the south, especially Hong Kong and Macau. Guigang has a rail line, several major highways, an expressway, and most importantly a large port on the Xi River, its direct connection to the Pearl River Delta. The area is 10,601 km^{2} (4,093 sq mi).

Climate is sub-tropical and monsoonal with an annual mean temperature of 21 °C (70 °F). Annual precipitation is 1,450.6 mm (57.11 in).

Climate data for Guigang, elevation 57 m (187 ft), (1991–2020 normals, extremes 1991–present)
Month	Jan	Feb	Mar	Apr	May	Jun	Jul	Aug	Sep	Oct	Nov	Dec	Year
Record high °C (°F)	29.4 (84.9)	34.0 (93.2)	33.2 (91.8)	36.2 (97.2)	36.6 (97.9)	37.1 (98.8)	38.4 (101.1)	38.2 (100.8)	38.1 (100.6)	36.2 (97.2)	33.2 (91.8)	30.4 (86.7)	38.4 (101.1)
Mean daily maximum °C (°F)	16.7 (62.1)	18.6 (65.5)	21.1 (70.0)	26.7 (80.1)	30.5 (86.9)	32.2 (90.0)	33.3 (91.9)	33.5 (92.3)	32.1 (89.8)	29.1 (84.4)	24.7 (76.5)	19.3 (66.7)	26.5 (79.7)
Daily mean °C (°F)	12.6 (54.7)	14.6 (58.3)	17.4 (63.3)	22.7 (72.9)	26.1 (79.0)	27.9 (82.2)	28.8 (83.8)	28.8 (83.8)	27.4 (81.3)	24.1 (75.4)	19.5 (67.1)	14.5 (58.1)	22.0 (71.7)
Mean daily minimum °C (°F)	9.8 (49.6)	11.9 (53.4)	14.8 (58.6)	19.8 (67.6)	23.0 (73.4)	25.1 (77.2)	25.6 (78.1)	25.7 (78.3)	24.0 (75.2)	20.4 (68.7)	15.8 (60.4)	11.1 (52.0)	18.9 (66.0)
Record low °C (°F)	1.5 (34.7)	0.8 (33.4)	4.0 (39.2)	8.3 (46.9)	15.2 (59.4)	18.7 (65.7)	22.0 (71.6)	19.5 (67.1)	15.7 (60.3)	10.3 (50.5)	5.0 (41.0)	−0.4 (31.3)	−0.4 (31.3)
Average precipitation mm (inches)	51.1 (2.01)	44.3 (1.74)	83.6 (3.29)	120.9 (4.76)	246.2 (9.69)	279.2 (10.99)	258.8 (10.19)	197.0 (7.76)	108.7 (4.28)	55.2 (2.17)	46.4 (1.83)	43.2 (1.70)	1,534.6 (60.41)
Average precipitation days (≥ 0.1 mm)	10.4	11.7	16.9	15.2	17.4	19.4	18.3	16.1	10.5	6.4	7.2	7.8	157.3
Average snowy days	0.1	0	0	0	0	0	0	0	0	0	0	0	0.1
Average relative humidity (%)	74	76	81	79	79	82	79	78	75	70	69	68	76
Mean monthly sunshine hours	74.1	61.4	51.2	86.4	137.1	145.9	191.7	200.2	190.9	188.1	147.2	127.4	1,601.6
Percentage possible sunshine	22	19	14	23	33	36	47	51	52	53	45	38	36
Source: China Meteorological Administration

== Administration ==
Guigang has 1 county-level city, 3 urban districts, and 1 county.

Districts:

- Gangbei District (港北区)
- Gangnan District (港南区)
- Qintang District (覃塘区)

County-level city:

- Guiping (桂平市)

County:

- Pingnan (平南县)

Map
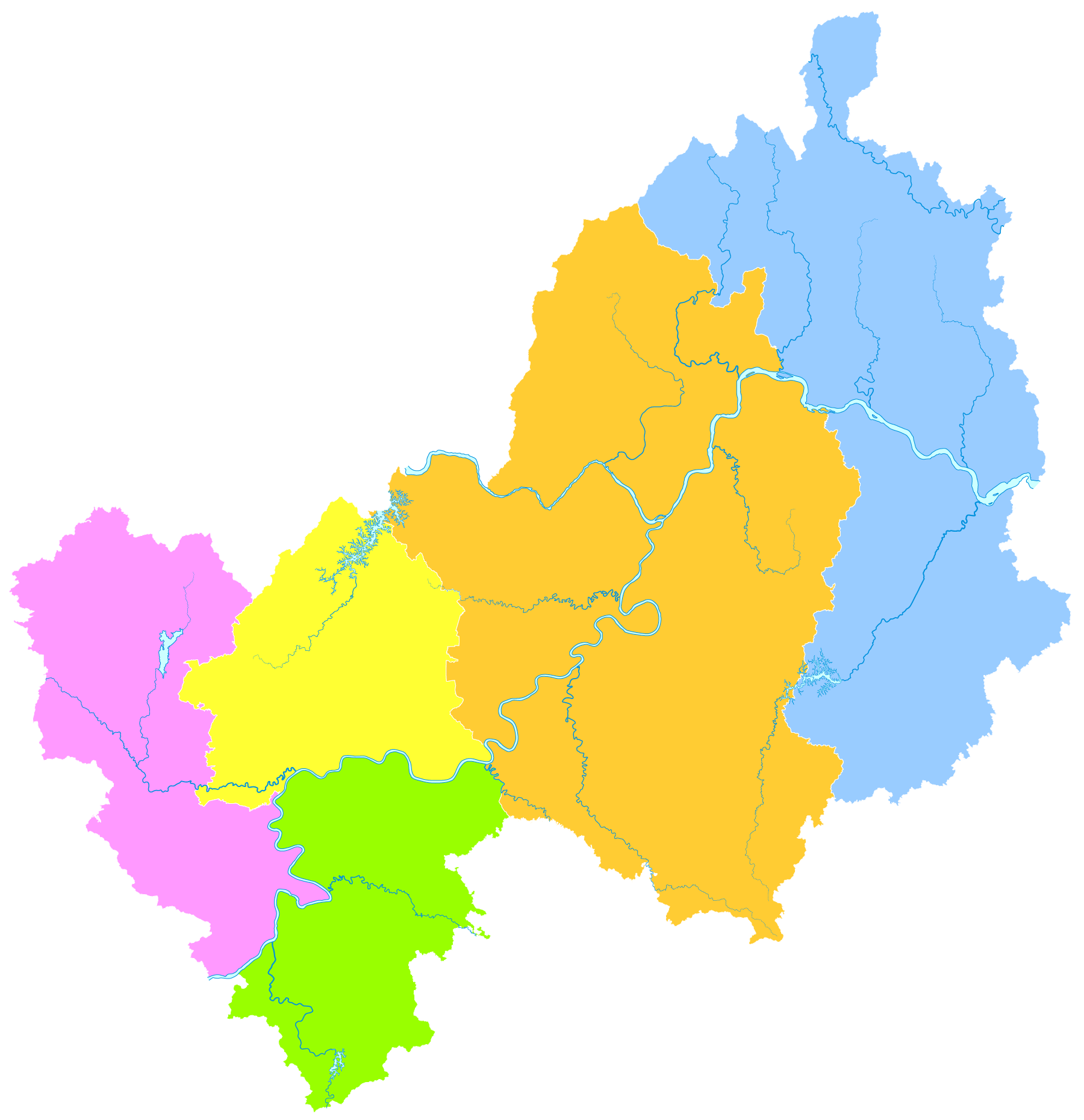

== Demographics ==
As of the 2020 Chinese census, its population was 4,316,262 inhabitants whom 1,277,231 lived in the built-up (or metro) area made of Gangbei and Gangnan Districts, Qintang District not being conurbated yet. Guigang's population is mainly Cantonese Chinese along with a number of minority tribes. At the end of 2024, the total registered population of the city was 5,647,800, and the resident population was 4,294,100.

== Economy ==
The 2015 GDP was 86.5 billion yuan; nominal GDP per capita was roughly $2,400, making it a relatively poor county in southern China. Transportation, shipping, and logistics are a vital part of Guigang's economy. More than 100 million tons of goods pass through its ports in one year. Major industries include chemical manufacturing, pharmaceuticals, metallurgy, tannery, textiles, printing, and food stuffs. Agriculture is also important with major crops including cereals such as rice and corn, sugar, medicinal herbs, tobacco, tea, lotus root, and green vegetables.

== Sports ==
The Guigang Sports Centre Stadium is located in Guigang. It has a capacity of 30,000 and it is used mostly for football matches. The venue opened on 21 June 2016.

== Twin towns and sister cities ==
Iloilo City, Philippines (2004)
Nakhon Si Thammarat, Thailand (2016)
