= Zhuang languages =

Various Tai languages used by the Zhuang people of southern China

Zhuang
- Vahcuengh (Wuming), Hauqcuengh (Yongbei); Kauqnuangz (Nong), Kauqnoangz; Hoedyaej (Guibian), Hauƽyəiч (Qiubei); Hauqraeuz, Gangjdoj (Yongbei, Nong, Qiubei); Kauqraeuz, Gangjtoj (Nong, Yang, Dai)
- Native to: China
- Ethnicity: Zhuang people
- Native speakers: 16 million, all Northern Zhuang languages (2007)
- Language family: Kra–Dai: Kam–Tai; Be–Tai ?; Tai; Northern Tai and Central Tai; Zhuang
- Standard forms: Standard Zhuang
- Writing system: Zhuang, Old Zhuang, Sawndip, Sawgoek

Language codes
- ISO 639-1: za
- ISO 639-2: zha
- ISO 639-3: zha – inclusive code Individual codes: zch – Central Hongshuihe Zhuang zhd – Dai Zhuang (Wenma) zeh – Eastern Hongshuihe Zhuang zgb – Guibei Zhuang zgn – Guibian Zhuang zln – Lianshan Zhuang zlj – Liujiang Zhuang zlq – Liuqian Zhuang zgm – Minz Zhuang zhn – Nong Zhuang (Yanguang) zqe – Qiubei Zhuang zyg – Yang Zhuang (Dejing) zyb – Yongbei Zhuang zyn – Yongnan Zhuang zyj – Youjiang Zhuang zzj – Zuojiang Zhuang
- Glottolog: None daic1237 = Daic; Zhuang is not a valid group
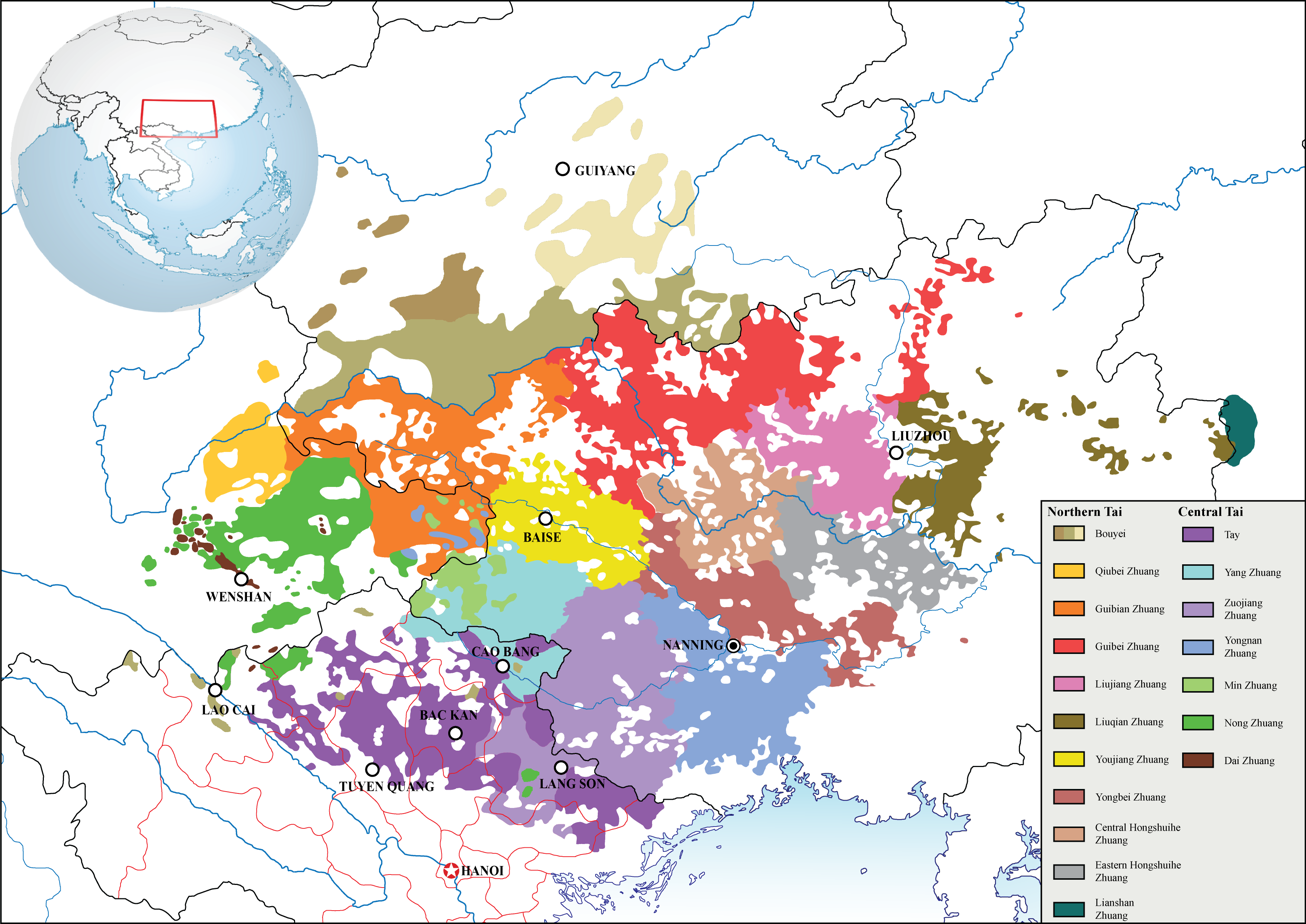
- Geographic distribution of Zhuang dialects in Guangxi and related languages in Northern Vietnam and Guizhou

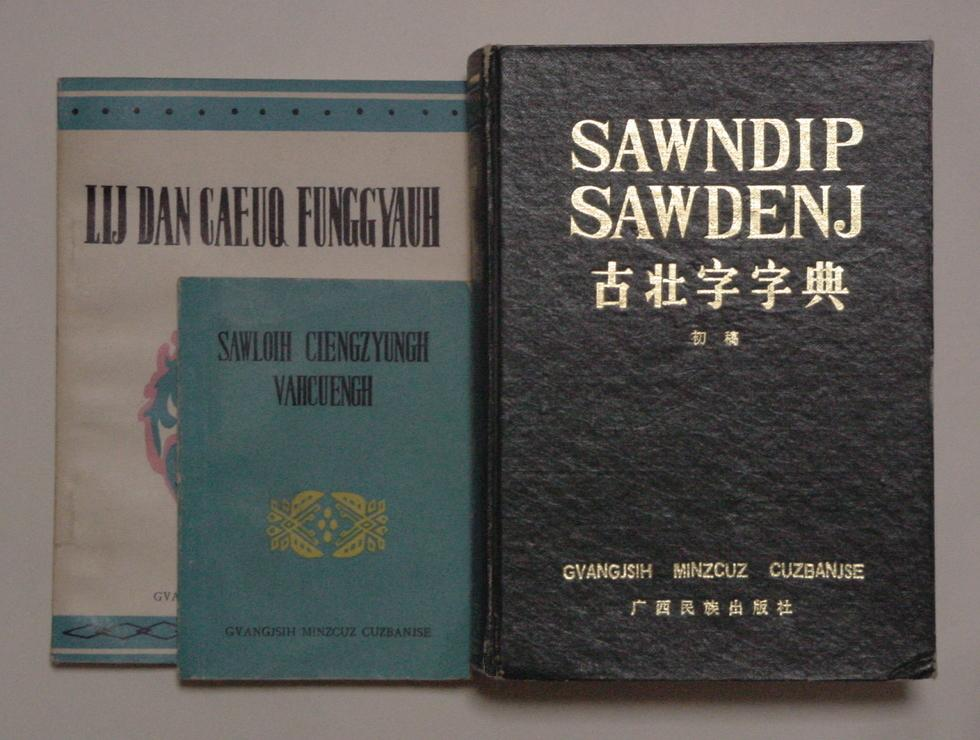
Books of Zhuang language

The Zhuang languages (/ˈdʒwæŋ, ˈdʒwɒŋ/; autonym: Vahcuengh [βa˧ɕuːŋ˧], (Note: pre-1982: Vaƅcueŋƅ) Sawndip: 話僮 (Note: from vah 'language' and Cuengh 'Zhuang')) (Note: simplified Chinese: 壮语; traditional Chinese: 壯語; pinyin: Zhuàngyǔ) are more than a dozen Tai languages spoken by the Zhuang people of Southern China in the province of Guangxi and adjacent parts of Yunnan and Guangdong. The Zhuang languages do not form a monophyletic linguistic unit, as northern and southern Zhuang languages are more closely related to other Tai languages than to each other. Northern Zhuang languages form a dialect continuum with Northern Tai varieties across the provincial border in Guizhou, which are designated as Bouyei, whereas Southern Zhuang languages form another dialect continuum with Central Tai varieties such as Nung, Tay and Caolan in Vietnam. Standard Zhuang is based on the Northern Zhuang dialect of Wuming.

The Tai languages are believed to have been originally spoken in what is now southern China, with speakers of the Southwestern Tai languages, which include Thai (modern-day Thailand), Lao (modern-day Laos) and Shan (modern-day Shan State, Myanmar) having emigrated south in the face of Chinese expansion. Noting that both the Zhuang and Thai peoples have the same exonym for the Vietnamese, kɛɛu^{A1}, from the Chinese commandery of Jiaozhi in northern Vietnam, Jerold A. Edmondson posited that the split between Zhuang and the Southwestern Tai languages happened no earlier than the founding of Jiaozhi in 112 BC. He also argues that the departure of the Thai from southern China must predate the 5th century AD, when the Tai who remained in China began to take family names.

== Surveys ==
Sites surveyed in Zhang (1999), subgrouped according to Pittayaporn (2009): N, M, I, C, B, F, H, L, P

Zhāng Jūnrú's (張均如) Zhuàngyǔ Fāngyán Yánjiù (壯語方言研究 [A Study of Zhuang dialects]) is the most detailed study of Zhuang dialectology published to date. It reports survey work carried out in the 1950s, and includes a 1465-word list covering 36 varieties of Zhuang. For the list of the 36 Zhuang variants below from Zhang (1999), the name of the region (usually county) is given first, followed by the specific village. The phylogenetic position of each variant follows that of Pittayaporn (2009) (see Tai languages#Pittayaporn (2009)).

1. Wuming – Shuāngqiáo 雙橋 – Subgroup M
2. Hengxian – Nàxù 那旭 – Subgroup N
3. Yongning (North) – Wǔtáng 五塘 – Subgroup N
4. Pingguo – Xīnxū 新圩 – Subgroup N
5. Tiandong – Héhéng 合恒 – Subgroup N
6. Tianlin – Lìzhōu 利周 – Subgroup N
7. Lingyue – Sìchéng 泗城 – Subgroup N
8. Guangnan (Shā people 沙族) – Zhěméng Township 者孟鄉 – Subgroup N
9. Qiubei – Gēhán Township 戈寒鄉 – Subgroup N
10. Liujiang – Bǎipéng 百朋 – Subgroup N
11. Yishan – Luòdōng 洛東 – Subgroup N
12. Huanjiang – Chéngguǎn 城管 – Subgroup N
13. Rong'an – Ānzì 安治 – Subgroup N
14. Longsheng – Rìxīn 日新 – Subgroup N
15. Hechi – Sānqū 三區 – Subgroup N
16. Nandan – Méma 麼麻 – Subgroup N
17. Donglan – Chéngxiāng 城廂 – Subgroup N
18. Du'an – Liùlǐ 六里 – Subgroup N
19. Shanglin – Dàfēng 大豐 – Subgroup N
20. Laibin – Sìjiǎo 寺腳 – Subgroup N
21. Guigang – Shānběi 山北 – Subgroup N
22. Lianshan – Xiǎosānjiāng 小三江 – Subgroup N
23. Qinzhou – Nàhé Township 那河鄉 – Subgroup I
24. Yongning (South) – Xiàfāng Township 下枋鄉 – Subgroup M
25. Long'an – Xiǎolín Township 小林鄉 – Subgroup M
26. Fusui (Central) – Dàtáng Township 大塘鄉 – Subgroup M
27. Shangsi – Jiàodīng Township 叫丁鄉 – Subgroup C
28. Chongzuo – Fùlù Township 福鹿鄉 – Subgroup C
29. Ningming – Fēnghuáng Township 鳳璜鄉 – Subgroup B
30. Longzhou – Bīnqiáo Township 彬橋鄉 – Subgroup F
31. Daxin – Hòuyì Township 後益鄉 – Subgroup H
32. Debao – Yuándì'èrqū 原第二區 – Subgroup L
33. Jingxi – Xīnhé Township 新和鄉 – Subgroup L
34. Guangnan (Nóng people 儂族) – Xiǎoguǎngnán Township 小廣南鄉 – Subgroup L
35. Yanshan (Nóng people 儂族) – Kuāxī Township 誇西鄉 – Subgroup L
36. Wenma (Tǔ people 土族) – Hēimò Township 黑末鄉大寨, Dàzhài – Subgroup P

== Varieties ==
The Zhuang language (or language group) has been divided by Chinese linguists into northern and southern "dialects" (fāngyán 方言 in Chinese), each of which has been divided into a number of vernacular varieties (known as tǔyǔ 土語 in Chinese) by Chinese linguists (Zhang & Wei 1997; Zhang 1999:29-30). The Wuming dialect of Yongbei Zhuang, classified within the "Northern Zhuang dialect", is considered to be the "standard" or prestige dialect of Zhuang, developed by the government for certain official usages. Although Southern Zhuang varieties have aspirated stops, Northern Zhuang varieties lack them. There are over 60 distinct tonal systems with 5–11 tones depending on the variety.

Zhang (1999) identified 13 Zhuang varieties. Later research by the Summer Institute of Linguistics has indicated that some of these are themselves multiple languages that are not mutually intelligible without previous exposure on the part of speakers, resulting in 16 separate ISO 639-3 codes.

=== Northern Zhuang ===
Northern Zhuang comprises dialects north of the Yong River, with 8,572,200 speakers (Northern Zhuang [ccx] prior to 2007):

- Guibei 桂北 (1,290,000 speakers): Luocheng, Huanjiang, Rongshui, Rong'an, Sanjiang, Yongfu, Longsheng, Hechi, Nandan, Tian'e, Donglan (Guibei Zhuang [zgb])
- Liujiang 柳江 (1,297,000 speakers): Liujiang, North Laibin, Yishan, Liucheng, Xincheng (Liujiang Zhuang [zlj])
- Hongshui He 紅水河 (2,823,000 speakers): South Laibin, Du'an, Mashan, Shilong, Guigang, Luzhai, Lipu, Yangshuo. Castro and Hansen (2010) distinguished three mutually unintelligible varieties: Central Hongshuihe (Central Hongshuihe Zhuang [zch]), Eastern Hongshuihe (Eastern Hongshuihe Zhuang [zeh]) and Liuqian (Liuqian Zhuang [zlq]).
- Yongbei 邕北 (1,448,000 speakers): North Yongning, Wuming (prestige dialect), Binyang, Hengxian, Pingguo (Yongbei Zhuang [zyb])
- Youjiang 右江 (732,000 speakers): Tiandong, Tianyang, and parts of the Baise City area; all along the Youjiang River basin area (Youjiang Zhuang [zyj])
- Guibian 桂邊 (Yei Zhuang; 827,000 speakers): Fengshan, Lingyun, Tianlin, Longlin, North Guangnan (Yunnan) (Guibian Zhuang [zgn])
- Qiubei 丘北 (Yei Zhuang; 122,000 speakers): Qiubei area (Yunnan) (Qiubei Zhuang [zqe])
- Lianshan 連山 (33,200 speakers): Lianshan (Guangdong), North Huaiji (Guangdong) (Lianshan Zhuang [zln])

==== Eastern Guangxi ====
In east-central Guangxi, there are isolated pockets of Northern Zhuang speakers in Zhongshan (14,200 Zhuang people), Pingle (2,100 Zhuang people), Zhaoping (4,300 Zhuang people), Mengshan (about 5,000 Zhuang people), and Hezhou (about 3,000 Zhuang people) counties. These include the following varieties named after administrative villages that are documented by Wei (2017).

- Lugang Village 蘆崗村, Etang Town 鵝塘鎮, Pinggui District 平桂區, He County 賀縣
- Qishan Village 啟善村, Yuantou Town 源頭鎮, Pingle County
- Xiping Village 西坪村, Zouma Township 走馬鄉, Zhaoping County
- Xie Village 謝村, Xinxu Town 新圩鎮, Mengshan County
- Nitang Village 坭塘村, Yuantou Town 源頭鎮, Pingle County
- Linyan Village 林岩村, Qingtang Town 清塘鎮, Zhongshan County

=== Southern Zhuang ===
Southern Zhuang dialects are spoken south of the Yong River, with 4,232,000 speakers (Southern Zhuang [ccy] prior to 2007):

- Yongnan 邕南 (1,466,000 speakers): South Yongning, Central and North Fusui, Long'an, Jinzhou, Shangse, Chongzuo areas (Yongnan Zhuang [zyn])
- Zuojiang 左江 (1,384,000 speakers): Longzhou (Longjin), Daxin, Tiandeng, Ningming; Zuojiang River basin area (Zuojiang Zhuang [zzj])
- Dejing 得靖 (979,000 speakers): Jingxi, Debao, Mubian, Napo. Jackson, Jackson and Lau (2012) distinguished two mutually unintelligible varieties: Yang Zhuang (Yang Zhuang [zyg]) and Min Zhuang (Minz Zhuang [zgm])
- Yanguang 硯廣 (Nong Zhuang; 308,000 speakers): South Guangnan (Yunnan), Yanshan area (Nong Zhuang [zhn])
- Wenma 文麻 (Dai Zhuang; 95,000 speakers): Wenshan (Yunnan), Malipo, Guibian (Dai Zhuang [zhd])

The Tày and Nùng language complex in Vietnam is also considered one of the varieties of Central Tai and shares a high mutual intelligibility with Wenshan Dai and other Southern Zhuang dialects in Guangxi. The Nùng An language has a mixture of Northern and Central Tai features.

==== Recently described varieties ====
Goonson (2011) distinguishes four distinct Zhuang languages in Wenshan Prefecture, Yunnan: Nong Zhuang, Yei Zhuang, Dai Zhuang, and Min Zhuang, all of which are Southern Zhuang varieties except for Yei Zhuang, which is Northern Zhuang. Min Zhuang is a recently discovered Southern Zhuang variety that has never been described previous to Goonson (2011). (See also Wenshan Zhuang and Miao Autonomous Prefecture#Ethnic groups)

Pyang Zhuang and Myang Zhuang are recently described Southern Zhuang (Central Tai) languages spoken in Debao County, Guangxi, China.

== Writing systems ==
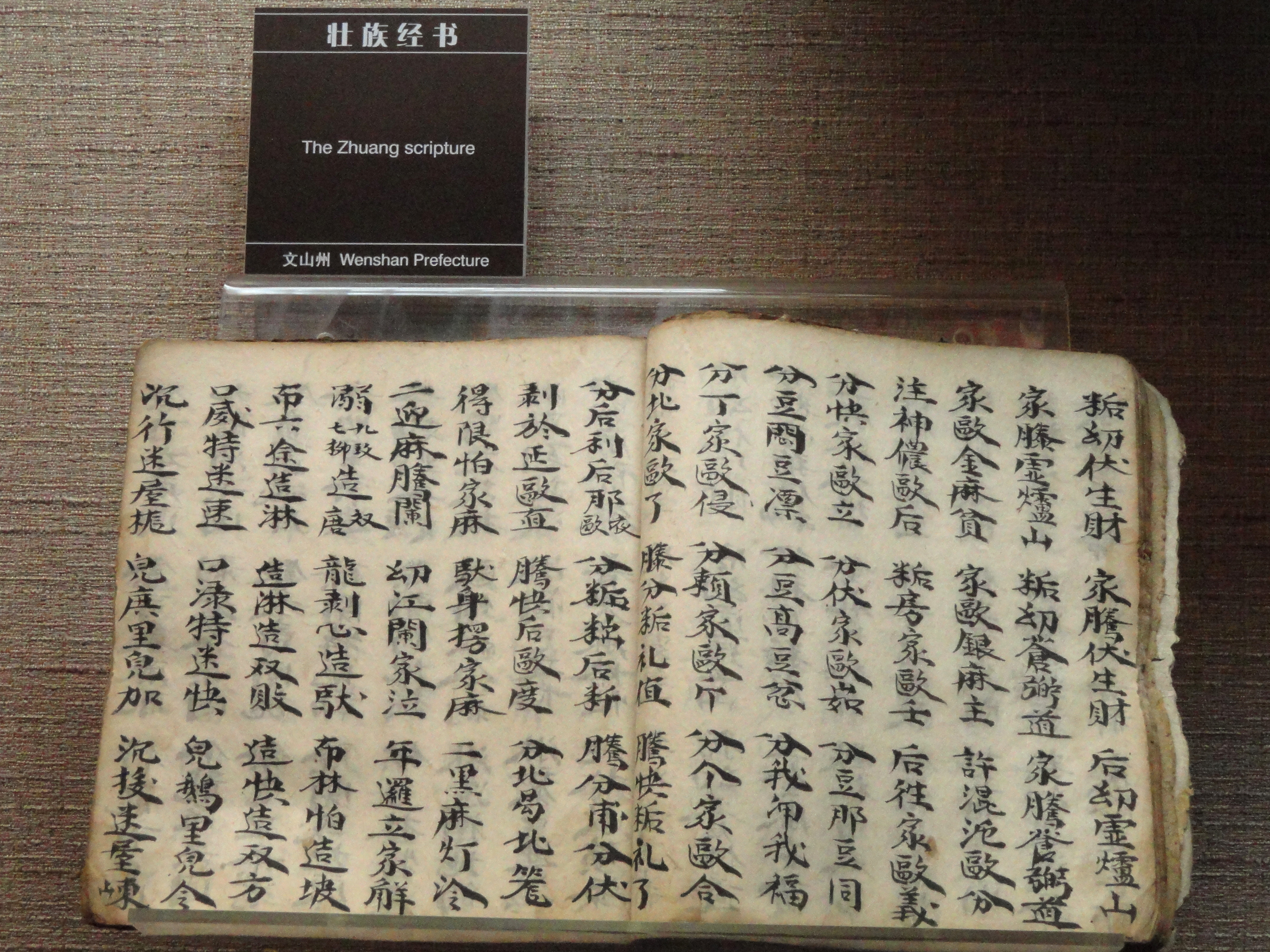
Zhuang Sawndip manuscript

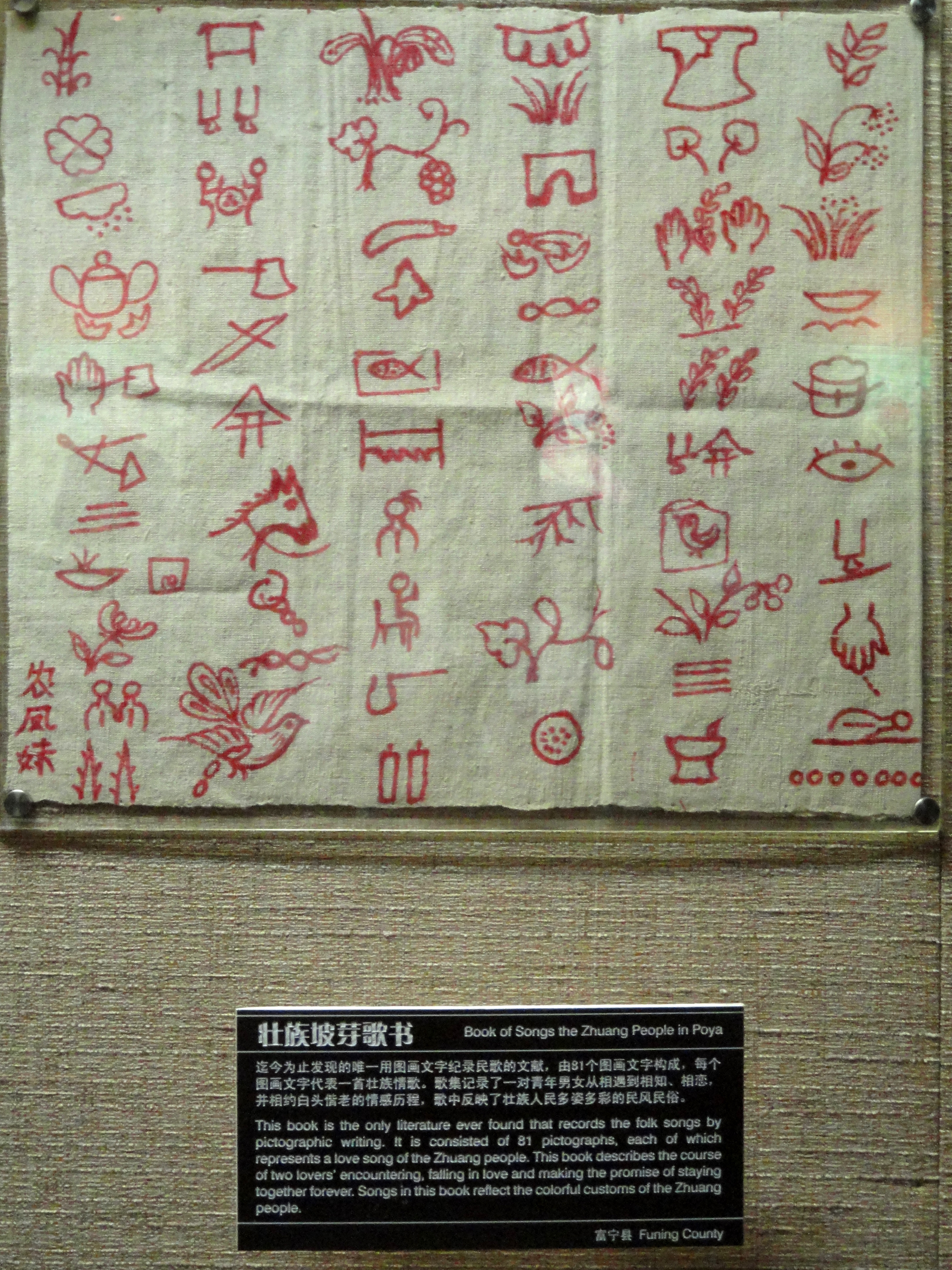
The 81 symbols of the Poya Songbook used by Zhuang women in Funing County, Yunnan

The Zhuang languages have been written in the ancient sawndip script for over a thousand years, possibly preceded by the sawgoek script. Sawndip is based on Chinese characters, similar to Vietnamese chữ Nôm. Some sawndip logograms were directly borrowed from Han characters, whereas others were created locally from components of Chinese characters. It has been used for writing songs, and more recently in public communications encouraging people to follow official family planning policy.

There has also been the occasional use of a number of other scripts, including pictographic proto-writing.

In 1957, a hybrid script based on the Latin script and expanded with Cyrillic- and IPA-derived letters was introduced to write Standard Zhuang. In 1982, it was updated to use only Latin letters. These are referred to as the "old" and "new" Zhuang, respectively. Bouyei is written in Latin script.

=== 1957 Alphabet ===
==== Consonants ====
B b D d G g C c By by Ƃ ƃ Ƌ ƌ Gv gv Y y Gy gy M m N n Ŋ ŋ Ny ny My my F f S s H h Ŋv ŋv V v L l R r

==== Vowels ====
A a I i U u E e O o Ɵ ɵ Ə ə Ɯ ɯ

==== Tone letters ====
Ƨ ƨ Ɜ ɜ Ч ч Ƽ ƽ Ƅ ƅ

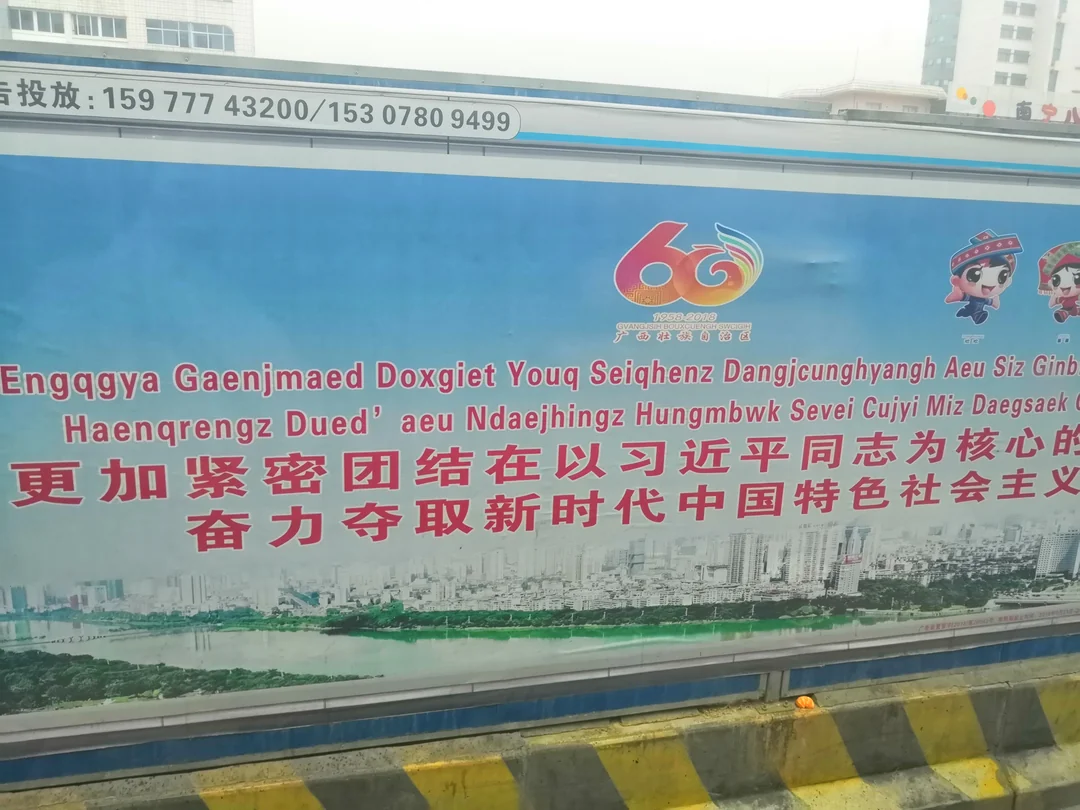
A sign in Zhuang language (top) located in Guangxi

=== 1982 Alphabet ===
==== Consonants ====
B b D d G g C c By by Mb mb Nd nd Gv gv Y y Gy gy M m N n Ng ng Ny ny My my F f S s H h Ngv ngv V v L l R r

==== Vowels ====
A a I i U u E e O o Oe oe (from Ɵ) Ae ae (from Ə) W w (from Ɯ)

==== Tone letters ====
Z z J j X x Q q H h

== See also ==
- Languages of China
- Zhuang studies

== Bibliography ==
- Zhuàng-Hàn cíhuì 壯漢詞彙 (in Chinese). Nanning: Guangxi minzu chubanshe. 1984.
- Edmondson, Jerold A.; Solnit, David B., eds. (1997). Comparative Kadai: The Tai Branch. Summer Institute of Linguistics and the University of Texas at Arlington.
- Johnson, Eric C. (2010). "A Sociolinguistic Introduction to the Central Taic Languages of Wenshan Prefecture, China" (PDF). SIL International. SIL Electronic Survey Report 2010-027.
- Zhuàng-Hàn-Yīng cídiǎn / Guengh Gun Yingh swzdenj / Zhuang–Chinese–English Dictionary 壯漢英詞典. Beijing: Minzu chubanshe. 2004. ISBN 7-105-07001-3.
- Tan, Xiaohang 覃曉航 (1995). Xiàndài Zhuàngyǔ 現代壯語 (in Chinese). Beijing: Minzu chubanshe.
- Tan, Guosheng 覃國生 (1996). Zhuàngyǔ fāngyán gàilùn 壯語方言概論 (in Chinese). Nanning: Guangxi minzu chubanshe.
- Wang, Mingfu 王明富; Johnson, Eric 江子楊 (2008). Zhuàngzú wénhuà yíchǎn jí zhuàngyǔ yánjiū / Zhuang Cultural and Linguistic Heritage 壯族文化遺產及壯語研究 (in Chinese and English). Kunming: Yunnan minzu chubanshe / The Nationalities Publishing House of Yunnan. ISBN 978-7-5367-4255-0.
- Wei, Mingying 韋名應 (2017). Guidong Zhuangyu yuyin yanjiu 桂東壯語語音研究. Beijing: Minzu chubanshe 民族出版社. OCLC 1082879363.
- Wei, Qingwen 韋慶穩; Tan, Guosheng 覃國生 (1980). Zhuàngyǔ jiǎnzhì 壯語簡志 (in Chinese). Beijing: Minzu chubanshe.
- Zhang, Junru 張均如; et al. (1999). Zhuàngyǔ fāngyán yánjiū 壯語方言研究 [A Study of Zhuang Dialects] (in Chinese). Chengdu: Sichuan minzu chubanshe.
- Zhou, Minglang (2003). Multilingualism in China: The Politics of Writing Reforms for Minority Languages, 1949–2002. Berlin: Mouton de Gruyter. pp. 251–258. ISBN 3-11-017896-6.
