= Min Zhuang language =

Tai language spoken in Yunnan, China

Min Zhuang
- Minz
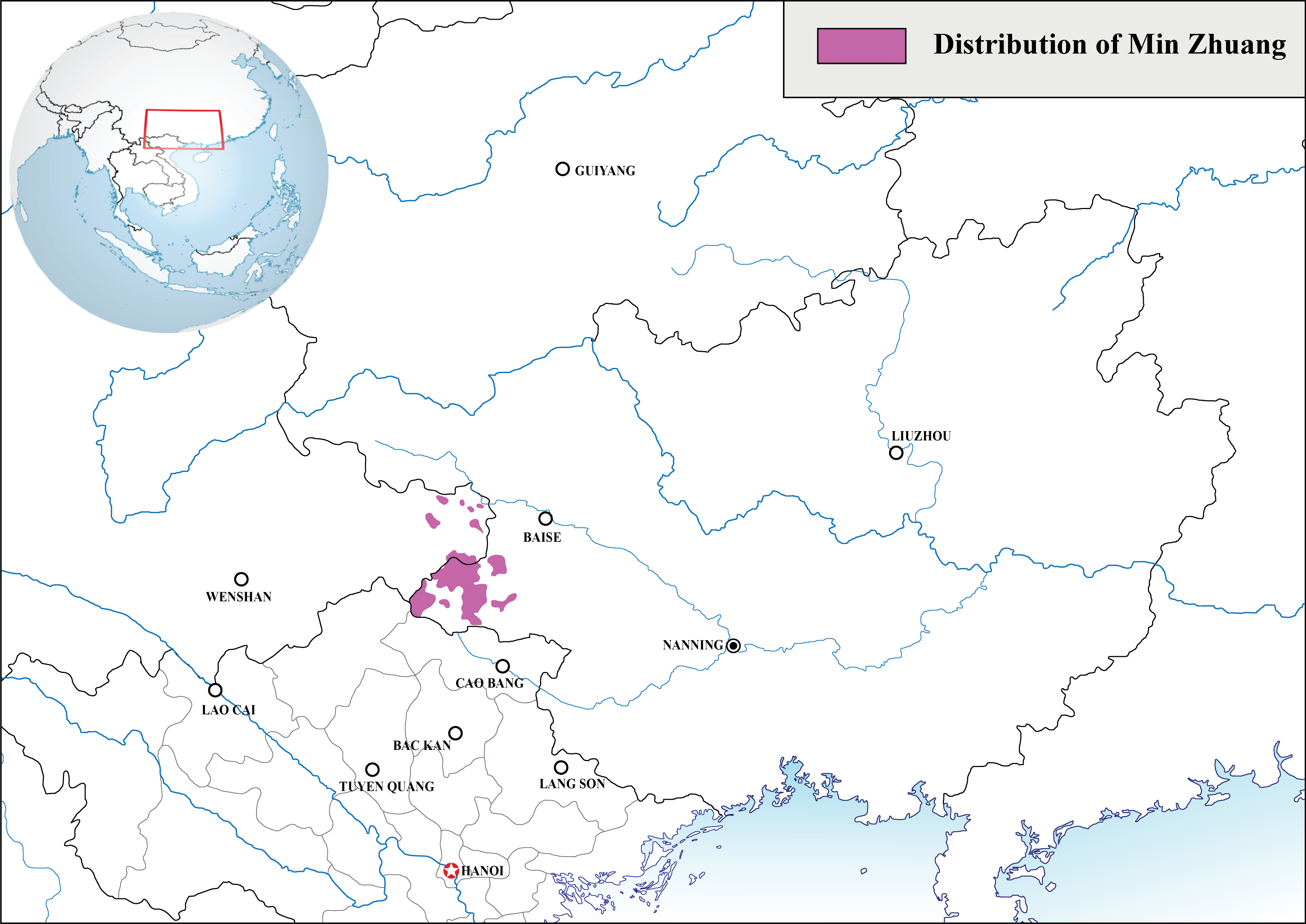
- Geographic distribution of Min Zhuang
- Pronunciation: [mìn]
- Native to: China
- Region: Funing County, Yunnan; southwestern Guangxi (?)
- Native speakers: 170,000 (2004)
- Language family: Kra–Dai: Tai; Central Tai; Min Zhuang

Language codes
- ISO 639-3: zgm
- Glottolog: minz1236

Min Zhuang is a recently described Tai language spoken in the Langheng (郎恒) area of Funing County, Yunnan, China, and possibly also southwestern Guangxi province. All speakers are reportedly bilingual in Yei Zhuang (also known as Guibian Zhuang or Sha), which is classified as Northern Tai (Johnson 2011a). The language was first described in 2011 by Eric C. Johnson of SIL International, though it had been earlier mentioned in Kullavanijaya and L-Thongkum (1998).

== Names ==
The Min Zhuang speakers of Guixun-Anhe call their language kaŋ˨min˨˦ or min˨˦sɔŋ˥˧. Another Min Zhuang dialect is called pu˨min˨˦ or kən˧min˨˦.

== Classification ==
Johnson (2011b) reported Min Zhuang to share many features with Nong Zhuang, a Central Tai language. However, it is unintelligible with the more widely spoken Nong Zhuang, Yei Zhuang, and Dai Zhuang languages.

== Distribution ==
Min Zhuang is spoken by about 2,600 people in 11 villages. With the exception of Shangmabu (上麻布), all of the following villages are purely made up of Min Zhuang speakers.

- Guixun-Anhe (贵训-安哈)
- Sankeshu (三颗数)
- Xionggu (雄估)
- Shangmabu (上麻布) - mixed with Nong Zhuang speakers
- Tianfang (田房)
- Getao (戈桃)
- Gezao (戈造)
- Gecai (戈才)
- Bagan (叭干)
- Na'en (那恩)
- Longnong (龙弄)

Johnson (2011b) reports that Min Zhuang is also likely to be spoken in southwestern Guangxi.
