= Zuojiang Zhuang languages =

Dialect-bund in Zhuang languages

Zuojiang Zhuang
- Thổ
- Native to: China, Vietnam
- Region: Guangxi, Yunnan, Lạng Sơn
- Native speakers: (1.8 million cited 2000 censuses)
- Language family: Kra–Dai: Tai; various; Zuojiang Zhuang

Language codes
- ISO 639-3: zzj
- Glottolog: zuoj1238

Zuojiang Zhuang (Chinese: 左江壮语; pinyin: Zuǒjiāng Zhuàngyǔ) is a dialect-bund in Zhuang languages spoken along the Zuo River, including the counties of Tiandeng, Daxin, Chongzuo, Ningming, Longzhou, and Pingxiang in Guangxi, some villages in Funing in Yunnan, and Vietnam, and is a putative branch of Tai languages of China and Vietnam. It is also known as Thổ (a name shared with Tày and Cuoi of Vietnam).

== Classification ==
In the 1950s as part of the classification of Zhuang languages, Zuojiang Zhuang was recognised as a dialect, or language, in Guangxi, China. In 2007, ISO 639-3 also included speakers Vietnam as the Zuojiang river goes into there. The classification of Phittiyaporn (2009) suggests Zuojiang is not a single branch, but part of two main branches of the Tai language family (clades B, F, and H). See Tai languages for details.
