= Pyang Zhuang language =

Tai language spoken in China

Pyang Zhuang
- Fuping Zhuang
- Native to: China
- Region: Debao County and parts of Jingxi County, Guangxi
- Language family: Kra–Dai: Tai; Central Tai; Pyang Zhuang

Language codes
- ISO 639-3: None (mis)
- Glottolog: None

Pyang Zhuang, or Fuping Zhuang (Chinese: 扶平语), is an underdescribed Central Tai language spoken in southwestern Guangxi, China. It appears to be most closely related to Nong Zhuang.

The Pyang refer to themselves as pjaːŋ^{B2} or tʰoː^{C1-A}, but are referred to as ˀjuj^{C1} by the surrounding Yang Zhuang people (Liao 2016:315).

== Distribution ==
Pyang Zhuang is spoken in the following locations of Guangxi, China (Liao 2016:315-316).

- Fuping Village 扶平村, Jingde Town 敬德镇, Debao County, Guangxi
  - Tuoxin 驮信村 (ˀbaːn55 teː31 θin21 in Pyang Zhuang)
- Ronghua Township 荣华乡, Debao County, Guangxi
- Kuixu Township 魁圩乡, Jingxi County, Guangxi

== Classification ==
Pyang Zhuang may be closely related to the Nong Zhuang language of Yunnan. Innovations shared between Pyang Zhuang and Nong Zhuang include the following (Liao 2016:316).

- Proto-Tai *kr- > tɕʰ- (as opposed to *kr- > kʰj- in Yang Zhuang, and *kr- > h- in Southwestern Tai). Examples include tɕʰaː^{A1-A} 'to seek' and tɕʰɔk^{DS1-A} 'six'.
- hɔk^{DS1-A} 'to do' is only found in Pyang Zhuang and Nong Zhuang (as opposed to hat^{DS1-A} 'to do' in Yang Zhuang, and het^{DS1-A} 'to do' in Zuojiang Zhuang and Isan).
