= Subdistrict (China) =

Subdistrict (Jiedao)

Chinese name
- Chinese: 街道
Transcriptions
Standard Mandarin
- Hanyu Pinyin: Jiēdào
Yue: Cantonese
- Jyutping: gaai1 dou6
Southern Min
- Hokkien POJ: ke-tō

Tibetan name
- Tibetan: ཁྲོམ་གཞུང་།
Transcriptions
- Wylie: khrom gzhung
- Tibetan Pinyin: tromzhung

Zhuang name
- Zhuang: Gailoh

Mongolian name
- Mongolian Cyrillic: Зээл гудамж
- Mongolian script: ᠵᠡᠭᠡᠯᠢ ᠭᠤᠳᠤᠮᠵᠢ
Transcriptions
- SASM/GNC: ǰegeli ɣudumǰi

Uyghur name
- Uyghur: كوچا باشقارمىسى
Transcriptions
- Latin Yëziqi: Kocha Bashqarmisi

Manchu name
- Manchu script: ᠵᡠᡤᡡᠨ ᡤᡳᠶᠠ
- Möllendorff: jugūn giya

Kazakh name
- Kazakh: ءمالى باسقارماسى мәлі басқармасы mälı basqarmasy

Kyrgyz name
- Kyrgyz: كۅچۅ باشقارماسى көчө башкармасы köçö başqarmasy

A subdistrict (Chinese: 街道 / 街; pinyin: jiēdào / jiē; lit. 'streets (Note: Chinese: 街; pinyin: jiē; lit. 'east-west public thoroughfare') and avenues (Note: Chinese: 道; pinyin: dào; lit. 'north-south public thoroughfare') / streets') is one of the smaller administrative divisions of China. It is a form of township-level division which is typically part of a larger urban area, as opposed to a discrete town (zhèn, 镇) surrounded by rural areas, or a rural township (xiāng, 乡).

In general, urban areas are divided into subdistricts and a subdistrict is sub-divided into several residential communities or neighbourhoods as well as into villagers' groups (居民区/居住区, 小区/社区, 村民小组).

The subdistrict's administrative agency is the subdistrict office (Chinese: 街道办事处; pinyin: jīedào bànshìchù) or simply the jiedao ban (街道办, jiēdào bàn). Because of the influence of the literal meaning of the Chinese word for 'subdistrict' (street [街道, jiedao]), the term is prone to alternative translations like 'street community'.

== See also ==
- Residential communities of China (社区, Shequ) — residential neighborhood subdivisions administrated by subdistricts.
