= Central Tai languages =

Set of dialects in northern Vietnam

Central Tai
- (controversial)
- Geographic distribution: China, Vietnam
- Linguistic classification: Kra–Dai: Kam–Tai?; Be–Tai?; Tai; Central Tai
- Subdivisions: (see Tai languages)

Language codes
- Glottolog: None deba1238 Debao–Jingxi–Nung
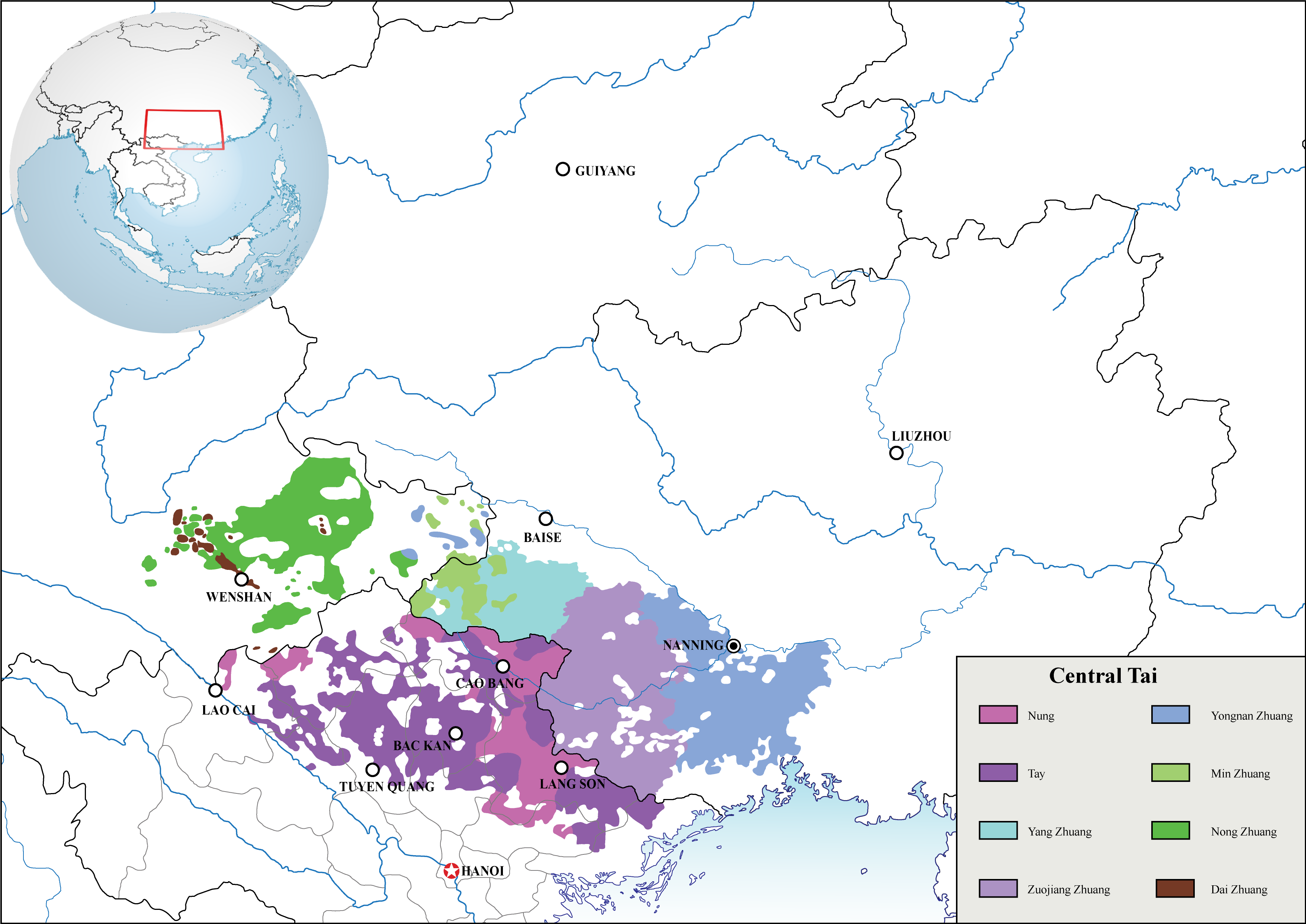
- Geographic distribution of Central Tai languages

The Central Tai languages include southern dialects of Zhuang, and various Nung and Tày dialects of northern Vietnam.

Central Tai languages differ from Northern Tai languages in that Central Tai distinguishes unaspirated and aspirated onsets, while Northern Tai generally does not (Li 1977). Southwestern Tai also displays this kind of aspiration contrast.

== Classification ==
William J. Gedney considers Central Tai to be more closely related to Southwestern Tai than to Northern Tai, while André-Georges Haudricourt argues for a closer relation to Northern Tai. Pittayaporn's (2009) tentative tree of the Tai branch, however, considers Central Tai to be paraphyletic.

Certain languages in predominantly Central Tai-speaking areas, such as Caolan and Nùng An in northern Vietnam, display Northern Tai features as well. These appear to be mixed languages that are not fully Central Tai or Northern Tai. Jerold A. Edmondson calls Caolan a "tertium quid".

Jerold Edmondson's (2013) computational phylogenetic analysis of the Tai languages shows Tay and Nung to be coherent branches under Central Tai.

- Central Tai
  - Core Central Tai
    - Nung Chau
    - Pingxiang Zhuang
    - Leiping Zhuang
    - Ningming Zhuang
  - Tay
    - Tay Bao Lac
    - Tay Khanh Trung
    - Cao Lan
  - Nung
    - Nung Chao (Longzhou Zhuang)
    - Nùng Phạn Slinh
    - Nung Inh
    - Western Nung/Nung Din (Nong Zhuang)
    - Nung Yang (Yang Zhuang)
    - Nung An

== Languages ==
Many Central Tai languages are known as Nong 侬 (Nùng in Vietnamese) or Dai 岱 (Tày in Vietnamese).

=== China ===
- Longzhou
- Ningming
- Nong Zhuang
- Dai Zhuang
- Min Zhuang
- Yang Zhuang (different from Yang)
- Pyang Zhuang
- Myang Zhuang

=== Vietnam ===
- Nung
  - Nùng Phạn Slinh
  - Nùng Cháo
  - Nùng Inh
  - Nùng An
  - Nùng Giang
  - Nùng Dín (=Western Nùng or Nong Zhuang)
- Tày
  - Tày Bảo Lạc
  - Tày Trùng Khánh
