= Lianshan Zhuang and Yao Autonomous County =

Lianshan 连山壮族瑶族自治县 · Lenzsanh Yen Linshan
- County
- 连山壮族瑶族自治县; Lianshan Zhuang and Yao Autonomous County; Lenzsanh Bouxcuengh Yauzcuz Swciyen
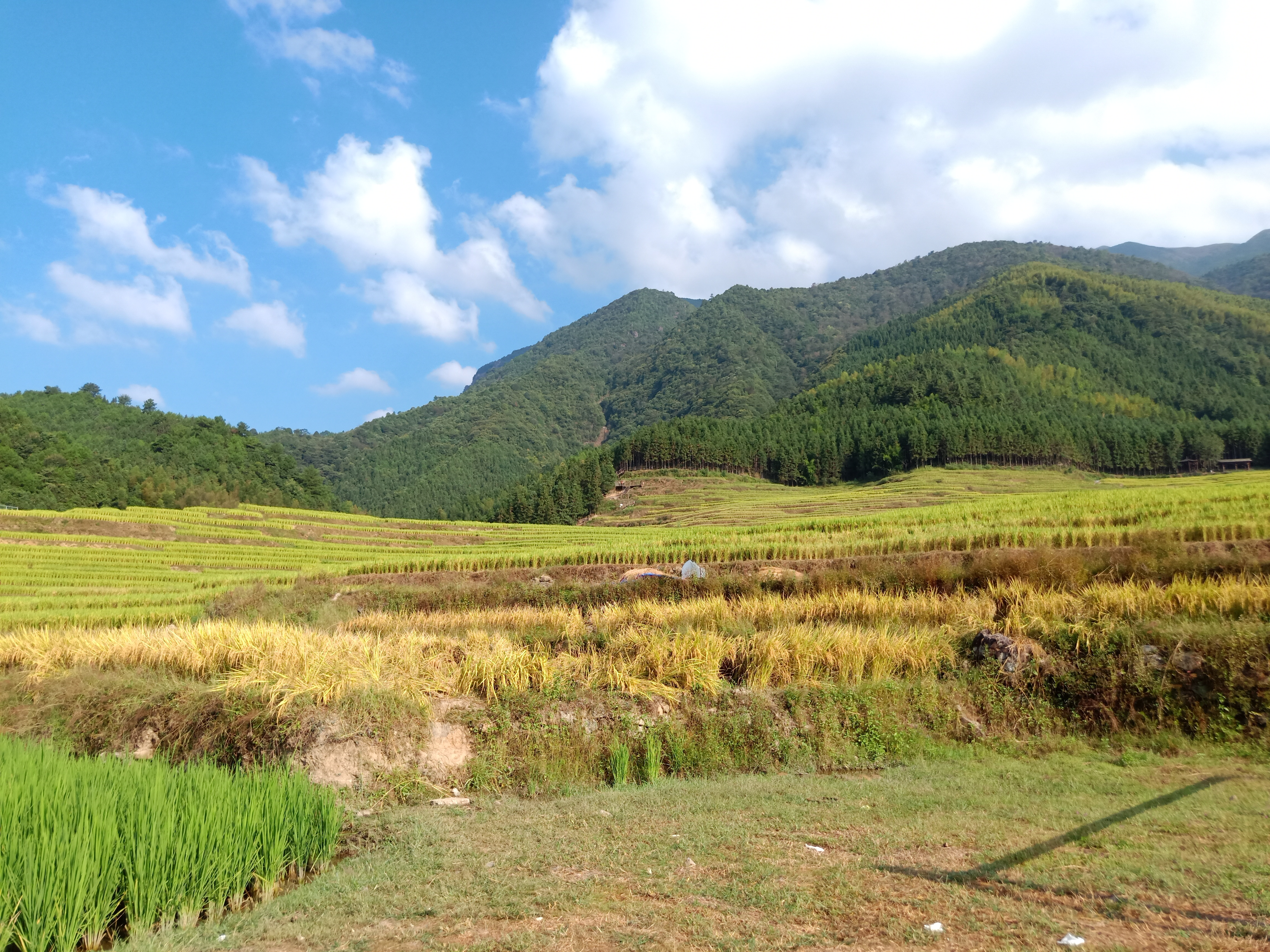

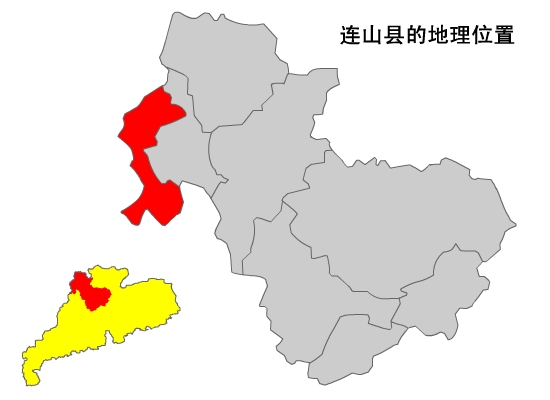
- Location in Qingyuan

- Location in Guangdong
- Coordinates: 24°30′N 112°04′E
- Country: People's Republic of China
- Province: Guangdong
- Prefecture-level city: Qingyuan
- County seat: Jitian

Area
  - County: 1,264 km^{2} (488 sq mi)

Population (2020)
  - County: 95,136
  - Density: 75.27/km^{2} (194.9/sq mi)
  - Urban: 38,758
- Time zone: UTC+8 (China Standard)

Lianshan Zhuang and Yao Autonomous County (postal: Lienshan; simplified Chinese: 连山壮族瑶族自治县; traditional Chinese: 連山壯族瑤族自治縣; pinyin: Liánshān Zhuàngzú Yáozú Zìzhìxiàn; Cantonese jyutping: lin4 saan1; Zhuang: Lenzsanh Bouxcuengh Yauzcuz Swciyen) is located in northern Guangdong province, China, and is under the administration of Qingyuan prefecture-level city. It borders Hunan to the north and Guangxi to the west and has a large concentration of Zhuang and Yao peoples, for whom the autonomous county was created and named.

== History ==
The State Council, established Lianshan Zhuang and Yao Autonomous County on September 26, 1962.

It is one of Guangdong's three autonomous counties, with its county seat in the town of Jitian, and the county governs 12 towns 3 agriculture tree farms. The county-wide total area is 1,265 km^{2} (488 sq mi).

The population is 114,000 people, with minorities accounting for above 65%, with the remainder being mostly Han.

== Climate ==
Climate data for Lianshan, elevation 301 m (988 ft), (1991–2020 normals, extremes 1981–2010)
Month	Jan	Feb	Mar	Apr	May	Jun	Jul	Aug	Sep	Oct	Nov	Dec	Year
Record high °C (°F)	27.2 (81.0)	29.3 (84.7)	33.0 (91.4)	33.2 (91.8)	35.6 (96.1)	38.1 (100.6)	39.2 (102.6)	39.4 (102.9)	37.2 (99.0)	35.9 (96.6)	32.4 (90.3)	27.4 (81.3)	39.4 (102.9)
Mean daily maximum °C (°F)	14.5 (58.1)	16.5 (61.7)	19.2 (66.6)	24.5 (76.1)	28.6 (83.5)	30.9 (87.6)	32.6 (90.7)	32.6 (90.7)	30.8 (87.4)	27.4 (81.3)	22.6 (72.7)	17.3 (63.1)	24.8 (76.6)
Daily mean °C (°F)	9.3 (48.7)	11.6 (52.9)	14.8 (58.6)	19.9 (67.8)	23.6 (74.5)	25.9 (78.6)	26.9 (80.4)	26.5 (79.7)	24.5 (76.1)	20.5 (68.9)	15.7 (60.3)	10.7 (51.3)	19.2 (66.5)
Mean daily minimum °C (°F)	5.9 (42.6)	8.3 (46.9)	11.7 (53.1)	16.6 (61.9)	20.2 (68.4)	22.9 (73.2)	23.5 (74.3)	23.1 (73.6)	20.8 (69.4)	16.2 (61.2)	11.5 (52.7)	6.6 (43.9)	15.6 (60.1)
Record low °C (°F)	−4.2 (24.4)	−2.9 (26.8)	−2.1 (28.2)	3.8 (38.8)	9.1 (48.4)	14.4 (57.9)	16.7 (62.1)	17.4 (63.3)	11.4 (52.5)	2.6 (36.7)	−1.2 (29.8)	−6.0 (21.2)	−6.0 (21.2)
Average precipitation mm (inches)	86.4 (3.40)	86.8 (3.42)	172.4 (6.79)	218.1 (8.59)	264.8 (10.43)	298.6 (11.76)	197.8 (7.79)	207.3 (8.16)	92.3 (3.63)	74.3 (2.93)	64.6 (2.54)	54.1 (2.13)	1,817.5 (71.57)
Average precipitation days (≥ 0.1 mm)	12.6	13.4	19.5	18.3	19.5	20.8	18.1	17.3	10.6	6.7	7.8	8.9	173.5
Average snowy days	0.3	0.2	0	0	0	0	0	0	0	0	0	0.3	0.8
Average relative humidity (%)	80	81	85	84	84	85	83	85	83	79	79	77	82
Mean monthly sunshine hours	69.8	58.3	51.1	68.3	99.3	104.7	159.0	151.7	141.3	153.8	124.7	112.8	1,294.8
Percentage possible sunshine	21	18	14	18	24	26	38	38	39	43	38	34	29
Source: China Meteorological Administration

== Languages ==
Lianshan has three ethnic groups: Zhuang, Han, Yao. The Zhuang people accounted for 47.73%, Han people accounted for 36.12%, Yao people accounted for 15.89%.

The Zhuang language of Lianshan is located in the southern part of the county, like Yongfeng, Futang, Xiaosanjiang, Jiatian, Shangshuai, It's the dialect of Northern Tai language. The local dialect can be communicated with the other Zhuang language as Yishan, Liujiang, Nanxiang, Xiashuai.

The local Chinese language is called Lianshanese, it's the dialect of Yue language, locate in the northern part of the county, like Jitian, Yonghe, Taibao, Hedong, and it's the lingua franca of all county. And the locals also could speak the Cantonese (standard Yue language) with some accent.

The local Yao language has two dialect: one is Mien language, the mother tongue of Guoshan Yao (過山瑤), they are living in Sanshui; another is Jianmien language, the speaker is called Bapai Yao (八排瑤), they are living in Daxuxinzhai. Between the two languages, the grammar is same, but have some difference on the vocabulary and pronunciation.

== Subdivisions ==
Lianshan is divided into 7 towns and 2 forest farms:

- Towns: Yonghe (永和), Jitian (吉田), Taibao (太保), Hedong (禾洞), Futang (福堂), Xiaosanjiang (小三江), Shangshuai (上帥)
- Forest farm: Lianshan (連山), Hedong (禾洞)
