= Eastern Hongshuihe Zhuang =

Northern Tai language of Guangxi, China

- Native to: China
- Region: Wenshan Prefecture, Yunnan; western Guangxi
- Native speakers: 1.2 million (2007)
- Language family: Kra–Dai: Tai; Northern Tai; Eastern Hongshuihe Zhuang

Language codes
- ISO 639-3: zeh
- Glottolog: east2363

Eastern Hongshuihe Zhuang is a Northern Tai language spoken in Guangxi, China, south of the Qian River and the eastern stretch of the Hongshui River.
