= Sawgoek =

Mythological ancient script of the Zhuang people of southern China

Sawgoek ("root script", pronounced [θaɯ˨˦kok]) or sawva ("insect script", [θaːu˨˦βa˨˦]) was a mythological ancient script mentioned in the Zhuang creation epic Baeu Rodo (modern Zhuang script: Baeuqroekdoz). The primordial god Baeu Ro was said to have brought sawgoek containing four thousand glyphs along with fire to the Zhuang people. However, in their unfamiliarity with fire, the people stored the fire under a thatched roof, causing the house to catch on fire. The sawgoek was consumed in the ensuing conflagration, and knowledge of writing was lost. Some Zhuang scholars believe that this myth stems from a vague remembrance of sawgoek in the collective consciousness of the Zhuang people long after knowledge of the writing system had been forgotten.

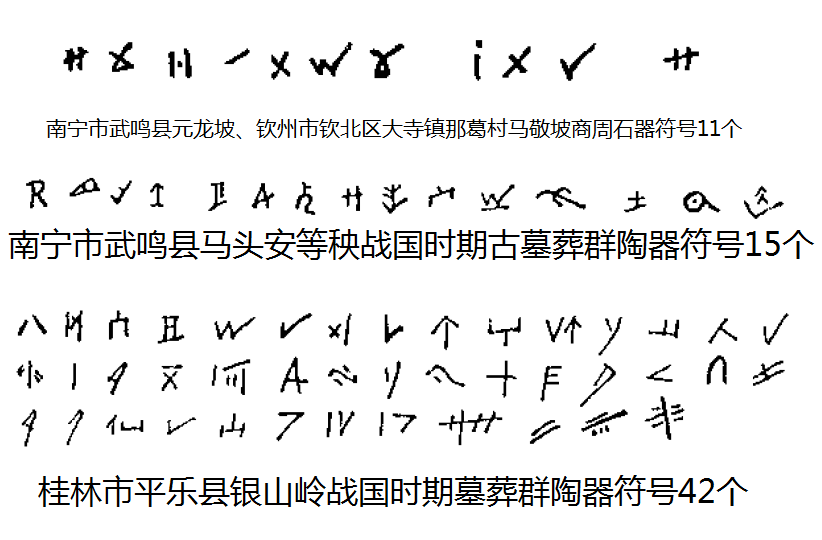
Examples of stone and pottery inscriptions from artefacts unearthed in Wuming, Pingle, and Qinzhou, Guangxi

Sawveh ("etched script", [θaːu˨˦weː˧]) refers to some 140 individual symbols inscribed on stonework, pottery, and bronzeworks excavated in western Guangxi, dating from the late Neolithic to the Bronze Age, the earliest examples being contemporary with the Shang dynasty (1600–1046 BCE) in the North China Plain. The glyphs bear some semblance to the glyphs of the Hemudu culture, Wucheng culture, Maqiao ruins (stratum V), Taihu Late Neolithic, and other Old Yue ruins in Guangdong. Some scholars suggest that these inscriptions are characteristic of an undeciphered logographic writing system or proto-writing, but this is disputed due to the lack of evidence of complete phrases.

As Chinese cultural influence spread through the Lingnan region from the Qin dynasty (221–206 BCE) onwards, the Chinese script came to dominate the region. From the Tang (618–907 CE) and Song dynasties (960–1279 CE) onwards, a script for the Zhuang languages based on Chinese characters called sawndip ("raw script", [θaːu˨˦ɗip]) came into use.
