= Myang Zhuang language =

Central Tai language of Guangxi, China

Myang Zhuang
- Native to: China
- Region: Debao County, Guangxi
- Language family: Kra–Dai: Tai; Central Tai; Myang Zhuang

Language codes
- ISO 639-3: None (mis)
- Glottolog: None

Myang Zhuang is a Central Tai language spoken in Ronghua Township 荣华乡, Debao County, Guangxi, China. Myang Zhuang speakers call themselves mjaːŋ (A2 tone) and tʰoː (C1-A tone), and refer to Yang Zhuang varieties as nʊŋ^{A2} instead of jaːŋ^{A1-G} (Liao 2016:311).

Myang Zhuang is spoken only in Ronghua Township, in villages including Nalong (那陇屯 naː^{A2} lʊŋ^{B2} in Myang and Yang Zhuang) in Nalong Village (那陇村) and Maomei Village (tʰuː^{A1-A} ˀdɔːŋ^{A1-G} in Yang Zhuang) (Liao 2016:311-312).

== Sources ==
- Liao Hanbo. 2016. Tonal development of Tai languages. M.A. dissertation. Chiang Mai: Payap University.
