= Tày language =

Tai language of Vietnam

Tày
- Tiểng Tày, Thổ
- Native to: Vietnam
- Ethnicity: Tày
- Native speakers: 1.63 million (2009)
- Language family: Kra–Dai: Tai; Central Tai; Tày
- Writing system: Latin (modified Vietnamese alphabet); Chữ Nôm Tày (archaic)

Language codes
- ISO 639-3: tyz
- Glottolog: tayy1238

Tày is the major Tai language of Vietnam, spoken by more than a million Tày people in Northeastern Vietnam. It was formerly known as Thổ, a name now shared with the Cuối language.

== Distribution ==
- Vietnam: northern provinces (including Cao Bang Province and Quang Ninh Province)
- Laos: northern region.

Tày is also spoken by emigrants in the Central highlands region of Vietnam (such as in Lam Dong Province).

There are also some Tày speakers in western countries. The region of Vietnam where Tày is spoken is bordered by China.

== Varieties ==
Tày linguistic varieties include the following:

- Tày Bảo Lạc – spoken in Bảo Lạc District, western Cao Bang province.
- Tày Trùng Khánh – spoken in Trùng Khánh District, northeastern Cao Bang province.
- Thu Lao or Dai Zhuang varieties are considered to be a different language.

== Phonology ==
=== Consonants ===
Tày consonants
| | | Labial | | Alveolar | Palatal | Velar | Glottal |
| | | plain | pal. | Alveolar | Palatal | Velar | Glottal |
|---|---|---|---|---|---|---|---|
| Plosive | voiceless | p | pʲ | t | c | k | |
| Plosive | aspirated | pʰ | pʰʲ | tʰ | | kʰ | |
| Plosive | voiced | b | bʲ | d | | | |
| Plosive | implosive | ɓ | ɓʲ | ɗ | | | |
| Fricative | voiceless | f | | s | | x | h |
| Fricative | voiced | v | | z | | ɣ | |
| Fricative | lateral | | | ɬ | | | |
| Nasal | | m | | n | ɲ | ŋ | |
| Trill | | | | r | | | |
| Approximant | | w | | l | j | | |

- The Cao Bẳng Tày dialect is the only variety to have the sounds /j w r ɣ b d bʲ/.

=== Vowels ===
Tày vowels
| | Front | Central | Back | |
|---|---|---|---|---|
| High | i | | ɯ | u |
| High-mid | e | | o | |
| Mid | | ə əː | | |
| Low-mid | ɛ | ɐ | ɔ | |
| Low | | a | | |

Tày diphthongs
| | Front | Back | |
|---|---|---|---|
| Close | ie | ɯə | uo |

- There are also three semivowels [u̯ i̯ ɯ̯] that mainly occur in syllable-coda position in combination with other vowel sounds. [u̯ i̯] are typically realized as consonant sounds [w j]. [u̯] follows front vowels /i e ɛ/ and central vowels /ə a ɐ/. [i̯] follows back vowels /u o ɔ/ as well as central vowels /ə a ɐ/. However, [ɯ̯] only follows /ə/.

=== Tones ===
Six tones are present in Cao Bẳng Tày:

Tày tones
| a̋ | ˥ |
| a᷄ | ˦˥ |
| á | ˦ |
| ā | ˧ |
| à | ˨ |
| a᷆ | ˨˩ |

== Writing systems ==
=== Chữ Nôm Tày ===
The Tày people used to write their ritual texts and then songs with the logographic script, known as chữ Nôm Tày. The script is similar to sawndip and was created during the reign of Mạc dynasty, based on Chinese characters. Some of the characters, like Vietnamese Nôm, are borrowed directly from Han characters, while others are created locally from Chinese components.

=== Tày-Nùng orthography (1961) ===
The current Tày-Nùng orthography was created in 1961 on the basis of chữ Quốc ngữ, and then was approved by the government of Vietnam following the Decree 206-CP. Its alphabet consists of 31 letters as follows:

- A a, Ă ă, Â â, B b, C c, D d, Đ đ, E e, Ê ê, F f, G g, H h, I i, J j, K k, L l, M m, N n, O o, Ô ô, Ơ ơ, P p, Q q, R r, S s, T t, U u, Ư ư, V v, X x, Y y.

Their pronunciation along with the multigraphs are listed in the tables below:

==== Consonants ====
Tày consonants
| Phoneme | IPA | Examples |
|---|---|---|
| B b | /ɓ/ | bươn ("month") |
| Bj bj | /ɓʲ/ | bjoóc ("flower") |
| C c/K k/Q q | /k/ | cần ("human") |
| Ch ch | /c/ | châư ("breath") |
| D d | /z ~ j/ | dú ("in, at") |
| Đ đ | /ɗ/ | đeng ("red") |
| F f | /f/ | fạ ("sky") |
| G g (Note: Only used in Vietnamese loanwords) | /ɣ/ | gương ("mirror") |
| H h | /h/ | hả ("five") |
| Kh kh | /kʰ ~ x/ | khao ("white") |
| L l | /l/ | lình ("monkey") |
| M m | /m/ | mường ("place") |
| Mj mj | /mʲ/ | mjề ("wife") |
| N n | /n/ | nặm ("water") |
| Ng ng | /ŋ/ | ngườm ("cave") |
| Nh nh | /ɲ/ | nhả ("grass") |
| P p | /p/ | pi ("year") |
| Pj pj | /pʲ/ | pja ("fish") |
| Ph ph | /pʰ/ | phân ("rain") |
| Phj phj | /pʰʲ/ | phja ("mountain") |
| R r | /r/ | rườn ("house") |
| Sl sl | /ɬ/ | slao ("girl") |
| T t | /t/ | ta̱ ("river") |
| Th th | /tʰ/ | tha ("eye") |
| V v | /v/ | vằn ("day") |
| X x | /s/ | xao ("spider") |

The letters tʼ, w, z are only used in some dialects.

==== Vowels ====
Tày vowels
| Phoneme | IPA | Examples |
|---|---|---|
| A a | /a/ | xam ("to ask") |
| Ă ă | /ă/ | ăn ("the") |
| Â â | /ə̆/ | bân ("sky") |
| E e | /ɛ/ | te ("he/she/it") |
| Ê ê | /e/ | bên ("to fly") |
| I i | /i/ | mi ("bear") |
| O o | /ɔ/ | co ("tree") |
| Ô ô | /o/ | tối ("to change") |
| Ơ ơ | /ə/ | nớ ("okay?") |
| U u | /u/ | tu ("door") |
| Ư ư | /ɯ/ | mừ ("hand") |

==== Tones ====
Tày tones
| Tone name | Chao tone contour | Description | Diacritic | Example with "ma" |
|---|---|---|---|---|
| khoang | ˧ (33) | mid level | ◌ | ma ("dog") |
| pàn | ˧˨ (32) | falling | ◌̀ | mà ("to come") |
| thỏi | ˨˩˧ (213) | low rising | ◌̉ | mả ("tomb") |
| pắc | ˧˥ (35) | high rising | ◌́ | má ("to soak") |
| lộm/chặm | ˧˨ˀ (32ʔ) | falling, glottalized | ◌̣ | mạ ("horse") |
| lươ̱ng | ˩ (11) | low level | ◌̱ | ma̱ ("blur") |

== Vocabulary ==
| English | Tày | Zhuang | Thai | Vietnamese | Middle Chinese | Proto Tai |
|---|---|---|---|---|---|---|
| one | nâng, đeo, êt | it | nueng หนึ่ง, -et -เอ็ด | nừng (obsolete word meaning few) | ʔiɪt̚ | *nɯːŋᴮ |
| two | sloong, nhỉ | ngeih | song สอง | | ȵiɪH | *soːŋᴬ, from Middle Chinese 雙 (MC ʃˠʌŋ, "two") |
| three | slam | sam | sam สาม | | sɑm | *saːm (“three”), from Middle Chinese 三 (MC sɑm, "three") |
| four | slí | seiq | si สี่ | | siɪH | *siːᴮ (“four”), from Middle Chinese 四 (MC siɪH, "four") |
| five | hả | haj | ha ห้า | | ŋuoX | *haːꟲ (“five”), from Old Chinese 五 (OC *ŋaːʔ, "five") |
| six | hốc, hôc, xốc | loek | hok หก | | lɨuk̚ | *krokᴰ (“six”), from Old Chinese 六 (OC *ruɡ, "six") |
| seven | chêt | caet | chet เจ็ด | | t͡sʰiɪt̚ | *cetᴰ (“seven”), from Middle Chinese 七 (MC t͡sʰiɪt̚, "seven") |
| eight | pet | bed | paet แปด | | pˠɛt̚ | *peːtᴰ (“eight”), from Middle Chinese 八 (MC pˠat̚, "eight") |
| nine | cẩu | giuj | kao เก้า | | kɨuX | *kɤwꟲ (“nine”), from Middle Chinese 九 (MC kɨuX, "nine") |
| ten | slip | cib | sip สิบ | | d͡ʑiɪp̚ | From Middle Chinese 十 (MC d͡ʑiɪp̚, "ten") |
| hundred | pac | bak | roi ร้อย | | pˠæk̚ | *roːjꟲ |
| hundred and one | pac lình êt | bak lingz it | nueng roi et หนึ่งร้อยเอ็ด | | | |
| thousand | xiên | cien | phan พัน | | t͡sʰen | |
| ten thousand | fản | fanh | muen หมื่น | | mʉɐnH | From Middle Chinese 萬 (MC mʉɐnH) |
| language | tiểng | | siang เสียง (sound) | tiếng | ɕiᴇŋ | |
