= Nong Zhuang language =

Tai language spoken in Yunnan, China

Nong Zhuang
- Kauqnuangz, Kauqnoangz, Kauqraeuz
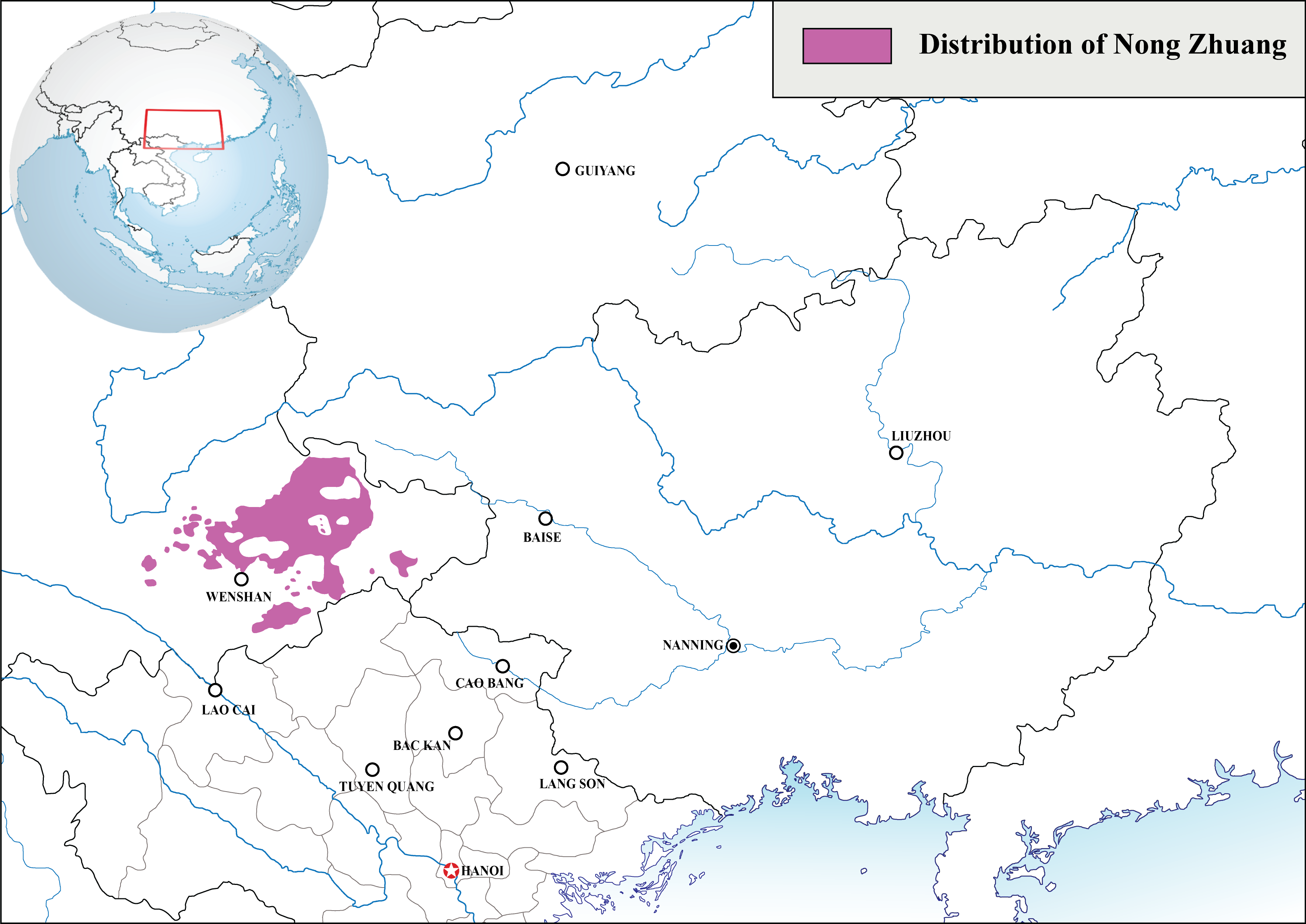
- Geographic distribution of Nong Zhuang
- Native to: China
- Region: Wenshan Prefecture
- Native speakers: 500,000 (2008)
- Language family: Kra–Dai: Tai; Central Tai; Nong Zhuang

Language codes
- ISO 639-3: zhn
- Glottolog: nong1247

Nong Zhuang (Chinese: 侬壮语) is a Tai language spoken mainly in Wenshan Prefecture, Yunnan, China. In Wenshan Prefecture, it is spoken in Yanshan, Guangnan, Wenshan, Maguan, Funing, Xichou, and Malipo counties, and also in Honghe Prefecture and Vietnam. The heaviest concentrations relative to other Zhuang groups are in Xichou (96% of the total Zhuang population) and Malipo (90% of the total Zhuang population) counties (Johnson 2011a:43).

== Names ==
Below are various names (both autonyms and exonyms) for the Nong Zhuang people (Johnson 2011a:43).

- Pu Nong (濮侬)
- pʰu31 nɔŋ33, pʰu22 nɔŋ44
- Nongzu (侬族) or Nongren (侬人)
- Long (龙)
- Bu Tei
- Bendi (Chinese: 本地 'indigenous')

== Subdivisions ==
Johnson (2011a) gives the following subdivisions for the Nong Zhuang peoples.

- Dao Nong (道侬), or Nong Dau (nɔŋ44 taːu55): Guangnan County
- Niang Nong (仰侬), or Nong Nyeng (nɔŋ44 ɲɛŋ22); also called the "Green Nong" (青侬): along the Chouyang River (畴阳河) in Xichou and Malipo counties.
- Du Nong (赌侬), or Nong Du (nɔŋ44 tu31): along the Duzhou River (赌咒河) in Maguan County.
- Ting Nong (厅侬): along the Puting River (普厅河) in central Funing County (Xinghua 兴华, Banlun 板仑 and Guichao 皈朝 Townships)
- Jin Nong (锦侬), or Nong Jing (nɔŋ44 tɕiŋ24); also called the "Upper Nong" (上方侬): northeastern Wenshan County and Yanshan County.

A variety of Nong Zhuang known as Ao 傲 (autonym: Genluo 艮雒) is spoken by 58 people (as of 1960) in Banlun 板仑, Funing County (You 2013:291; Yunnan 1979).

Pyang Zhuang (or Fuping Zhuang 扶平壮), a Central Tai language variety closely related to Nong Zhuang, is spoken in Fuping Township 扶平乡, Debao County, Guangxi.

== See also ==
- Nung language (Tai) of Vietnam
