= Nùng language (Tai) =

Tai language spoken in Vietnam

Nùng
- Native to: Vietnam, China, Laos
- Ethnicity: Nung
- Native speakers: 968,800 (2009 census)
- Language family: Kra–Dai: Kam–Tai?; Be–Tai; Tai; Central Tai; Nùng
- Writing system: Latin (modified Vietnamese alphabet)

Language codes
- ISO 639-3: nut
- Glottolog: nung1283

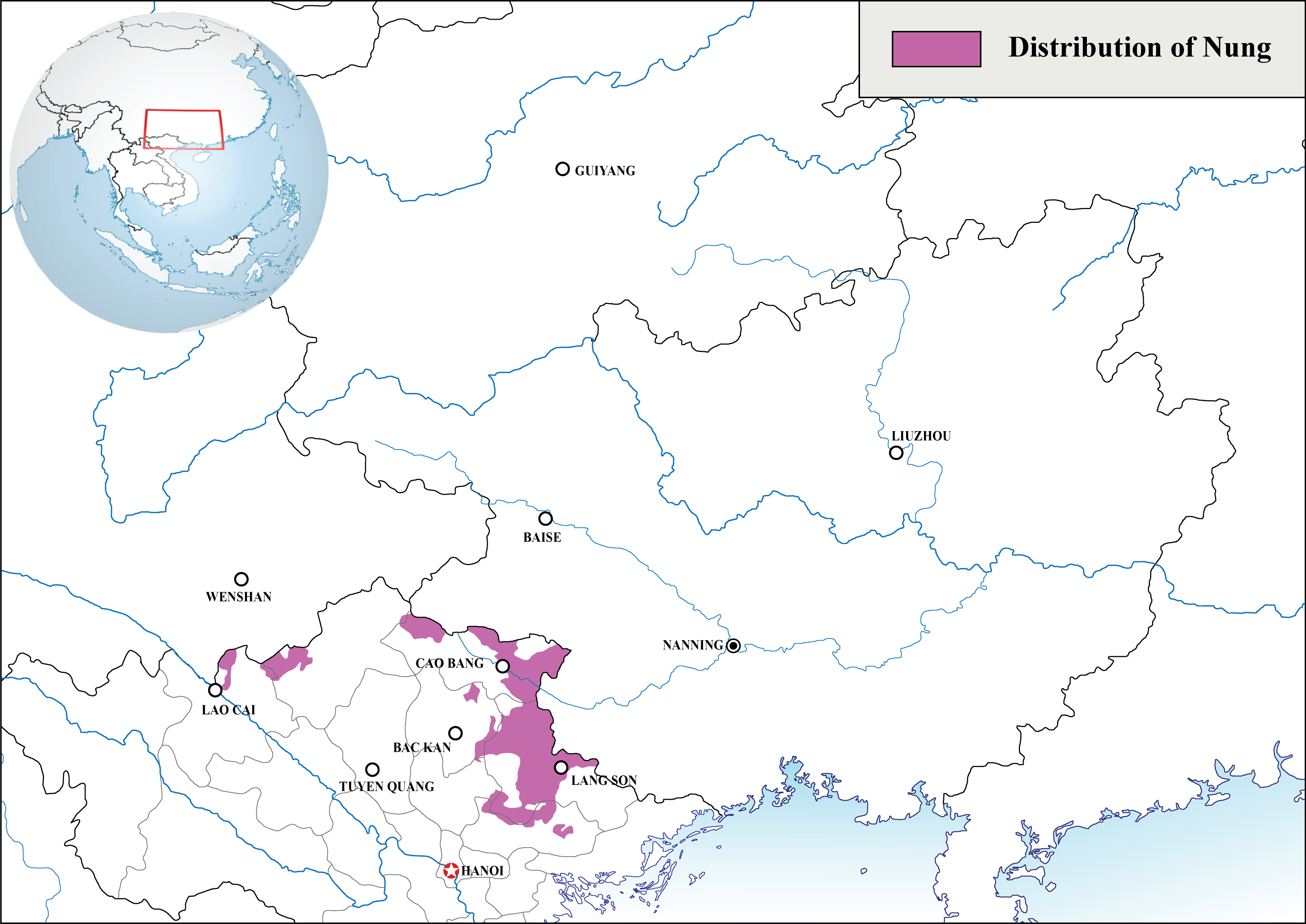
Geographic distribution of Nung Language

Nùng is a Central Tai language spoken mostly in Cao Bằng and Lạng Sơn provinces in Vietnam and also in China and Laos. It is also known as Nong, Tai Nùng, Tay, and Tày Nùng. Nùng is the name given to the various Tai languages of northern Vietnam that are spoken by peoples classified as Nùng by the Vietnamese government. The Nùng were originally Zhuang people who migrated to Vietnam in the 16th and 18th centuries.

== Speakers ==
In the 1999 census, it had about 856,000 speakers. It had about 968,800 speakers in the 2009 census.

== Distribution ==
In Vietnam, Nùng is spoken in all of the Northeast Region (except Phu Tho Province) and parts of the South Central Region (Dak Lak, Gia Lai and Lam Dong Provinces).

In China, Nùng is spoken in the Wenshan Prefecture of Yunnan and Jinxi, Guangxi. Speakers of the Nùng language in China are classified as Zhuang.

The Nùng people of Laos are believed to have originated from a border crossing in Vietnam to Laos. Nùng speakers in Laos are located in the Xiengngeun district of Luang Prabang Province. An alternative name for Nung in Laos is Nong.

== Phonology ==
The following are the sounds of the Nùng language:

=== Consonants ===
		Labial	Alveolar	Post- alveolar	Palatal		Velar	Glottal
Nasal		m	n		ɲ		ŋ	
Plosive/ Affricate	voiceless	p	t	tʃ			k	ʔ
Plosive/ Affricate	aspirated	pʰ	tʰ				kʰ	
Plosive/ Affricate	implosive	ɓ	ɗ					
Fricative	voiceless	f	s					h
Fricative	voiced	v		ʐ				
Fricative	lateral		ɬ					
Approximant		w	l		j	j̈		

Phoneme	Allophone
/kʰ/	[kˣ]
/w/	[u̯]
/j/	[i̯]
/j̈/	[ɨ̯], [ɰ]

=== Vowels ===
	Front	Central	Back
High	i iː	ɨ ɨː	u uː
High-mid	eː		oː
Mid		əː	
Low-mid			ɔ ɔː
Low	æ æː	a aː	

Phoneme	Allophone	Notes
/eː/	[eᵊ]	in closed syllables
/æ/	[ɛ]	
/ɨ/	[ɯ]	
/ɨː/	[ɯː]	
/əː/	[ə]	in closed syllables
/uː/	[uᵊ]	before /n/
/oː/	[oᵊ]	before /n/
/ɔː/	[ɒ]	
/ɔ/	[ɔʷ]	before /ŋ/

=== Tone ===
The Nùng language has six tones:

Tones
á	˦
a	˧
à	˨
a᷆	˨˩
á+glottal	˦ʔ
à+glottal	˨ʔ

== Varieties ==
Nùng consists of many varieties, some of which are listed below.

- Nùng Phạn Slinh (Nohng Fạn Slihng) is spoken in eastern Lạng Sơn Province. It is spoken by approximately 100,000 people (Freiberger 1976a). Freiberger (1976a) is based on Nùng Phạn Slinh as spoken by refugees from Bắc Giang Province who had moved to Lâm Đồng Province in 1954 (then known as Tuyên Đức Province, which consisted of Đà Lạt, Đơn Dương District, Đức Trọng District, Lạc Dương District). Freiberger (1976) also reported Nùng Phạn Slinh refugees in Biên Hòa Province and Long Khánh Province, which were former administrative divisions in South Vietnam.
- Nùng Cháo is spoken around Lạng Sơn city. It is identical with William J. Gedney's Lungchow.
- Nùng Inh is spoken in western Lạng Sơn Province. It is identical with William J. Gedney's Western Nùng of Mường Khương, Lào Cai Province.
- Nùng An is spoken in and around Quảng Uyên, Quảng Hòa District, Cao Bằng. Like the Long'an (隆安) speakers of Guangxi, it has a mixture of Northern and Central Tai features.
- Nùng Giang is spoken in Hà Quảng District, Cao Bằng. It is also spoken across the border in Pingmeng (平孟镇), Jingxi County, Guangxi.

Nùng Vên (En), a language formerly undistinguished from surrounding Central Tai (Nùng) dialects, was discovered to be a Kra language by Hoàng Văn Ma and Jerold A. Edmondson in 1998. Its speakers are classified as Nùng by the Vietnamese government.

== See also ==
- Nong Zhuang language, spoken in China
