= Yei Zhuang language =

Tai language spoken in Yunnan, China

Yei Zhuang
- Buyue
- Pronunciation: [pu˨jai˩˧]
- Native to: China
- Region: Wenshan Prefecture, Yunnan; western Guangxi
- Ethnicity: Sha
- Native speakers: 1 million (2007)
- Language family: Kra–Dai: Tai; Northern Tai; Yei Zhuang
- Dialects: Po-ai

Language codes
- ISO 639-3: Either: zgn – Guibian Zhuang zqe – Qiubei Zhuang
- Glottolog: guib1244 Guibian qiub1238 Qiubei

Yei Zhuang is a Northern Tai language complex spoken in Wenshan Prefecture, Yunnan, China. Its speakers are also known as the Sha (沙族), a subgroup of the Zhuang.

== Distribution ==
In Yunnan, Yei Zhuang dialects are spoken in Funing and Guangnan counties (also in Guangxi to the east and north), as well as Qiubei (probably also in Qujing Municipality to the north). The largest concentrations of Yei Zhuang speakers are found in Qiubei (80% of total Zhuang population) and Funing (50% of total Zhuang population) counties (Johnson 2011a:43).

Po-ai, a Tai language of Funing County described by Fang-kuei Li in the mid-1900s, was determined by Johnson (2011b) to be a Yei Zhuang dialect.

== Names ==
Below are various names (both autonyms and exonyms) for speakers of Yei Zhuang (Johnson 2011a:43).

- pu Nong (濮侬)
- pu35 ʔjai34, pu33 juei34, pu22 jai13; bu ji (Qiubei)
- bu Yai (布雅衣)
- bu Yei (布依, 布瑞, 布越)
- Shazu (沙族) or Sharen (沙人)
- Baisha (白沙)
- Nongqianbeng (侬迁绷)
- Zhongjia (仲家)

Many of these are names of Bouyei as well.

== Characteristics ==
There are no palatalized consonants in Qiubei Zhuang. /pj/ in standard Zhuang is /p/, as in /pja1/ "fish", pjak7 "vegetable" is /pa/1, /pak/7. /mj/ is m or n，for example mjaːk3 "slippery", mjaːi2 "saliva" as /ma6/, /naːi2/. /kj/ is merged into k or t，for example kjaːŋ1 "middle", kja4(orphan) is /kaːŋ3/, /tsa4/. The consonant k before i, e is changed to ts, for instance ki3 "several", kiːŋ2 (triangular cooker), ke5 "old" as /tʃi1/, /tʃiːŋ2/, /tʃes/.
