= Funing County, Yunnan =

Funing County 富宁县 • Funingz Yen
- County
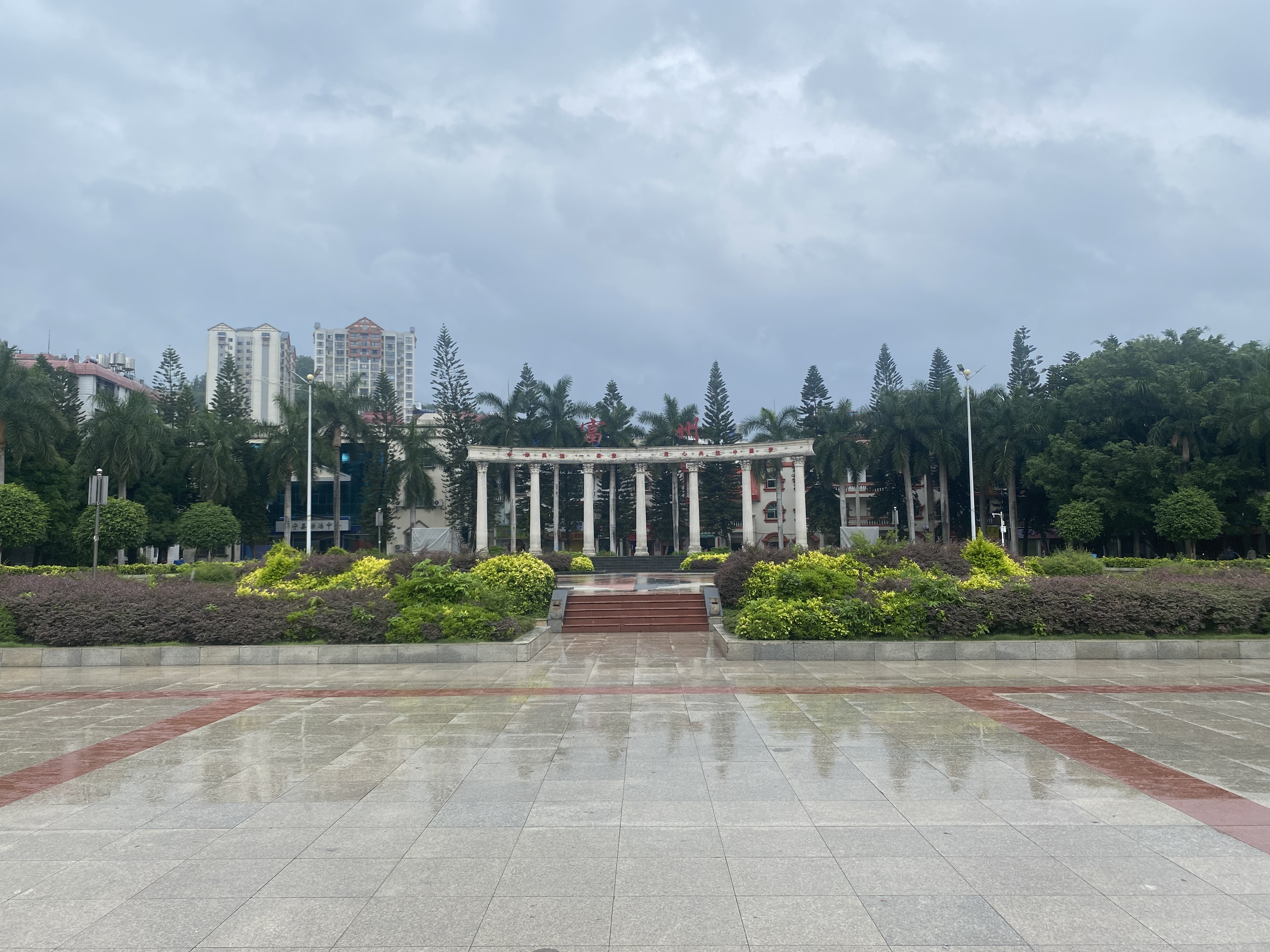
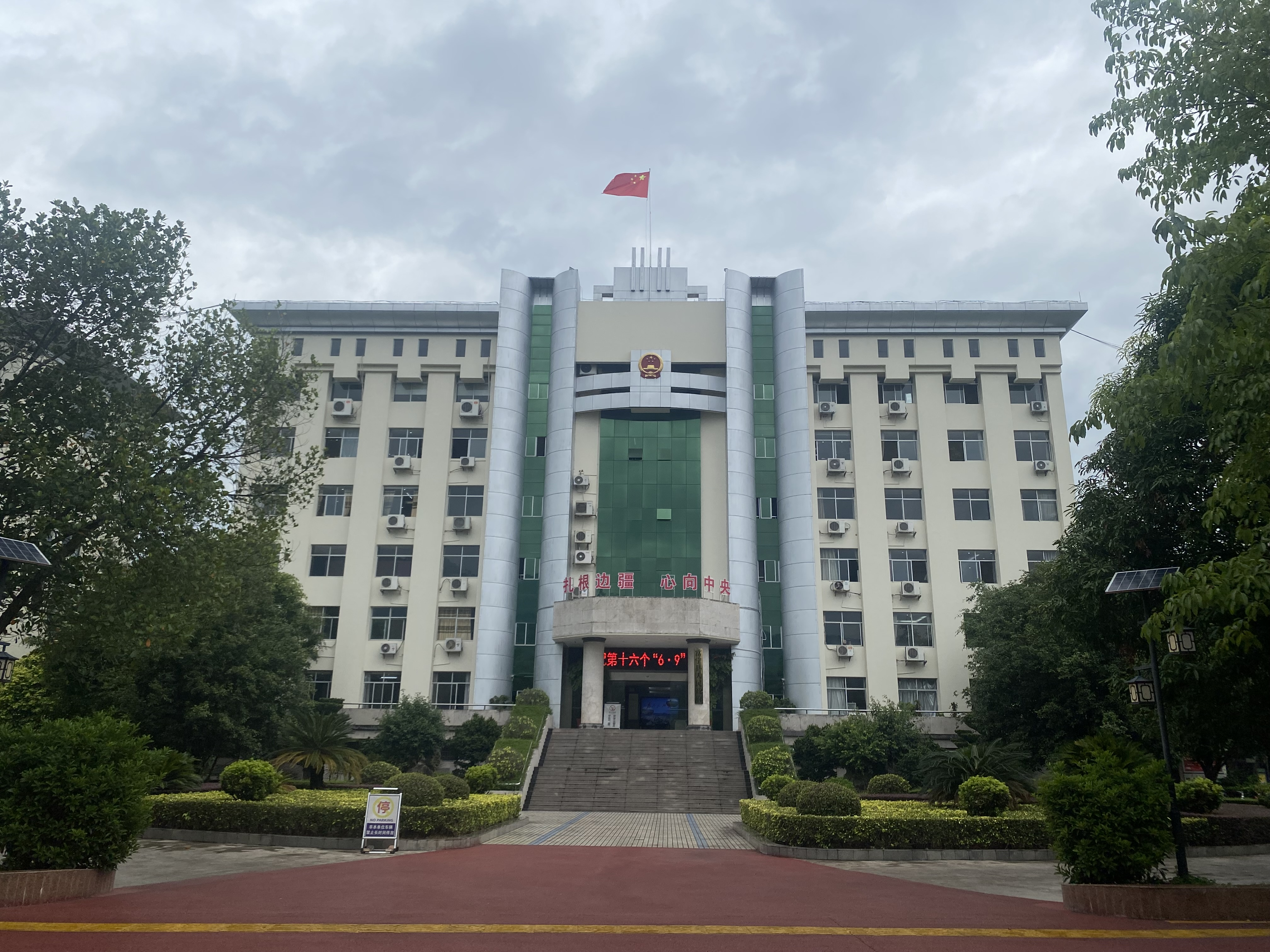
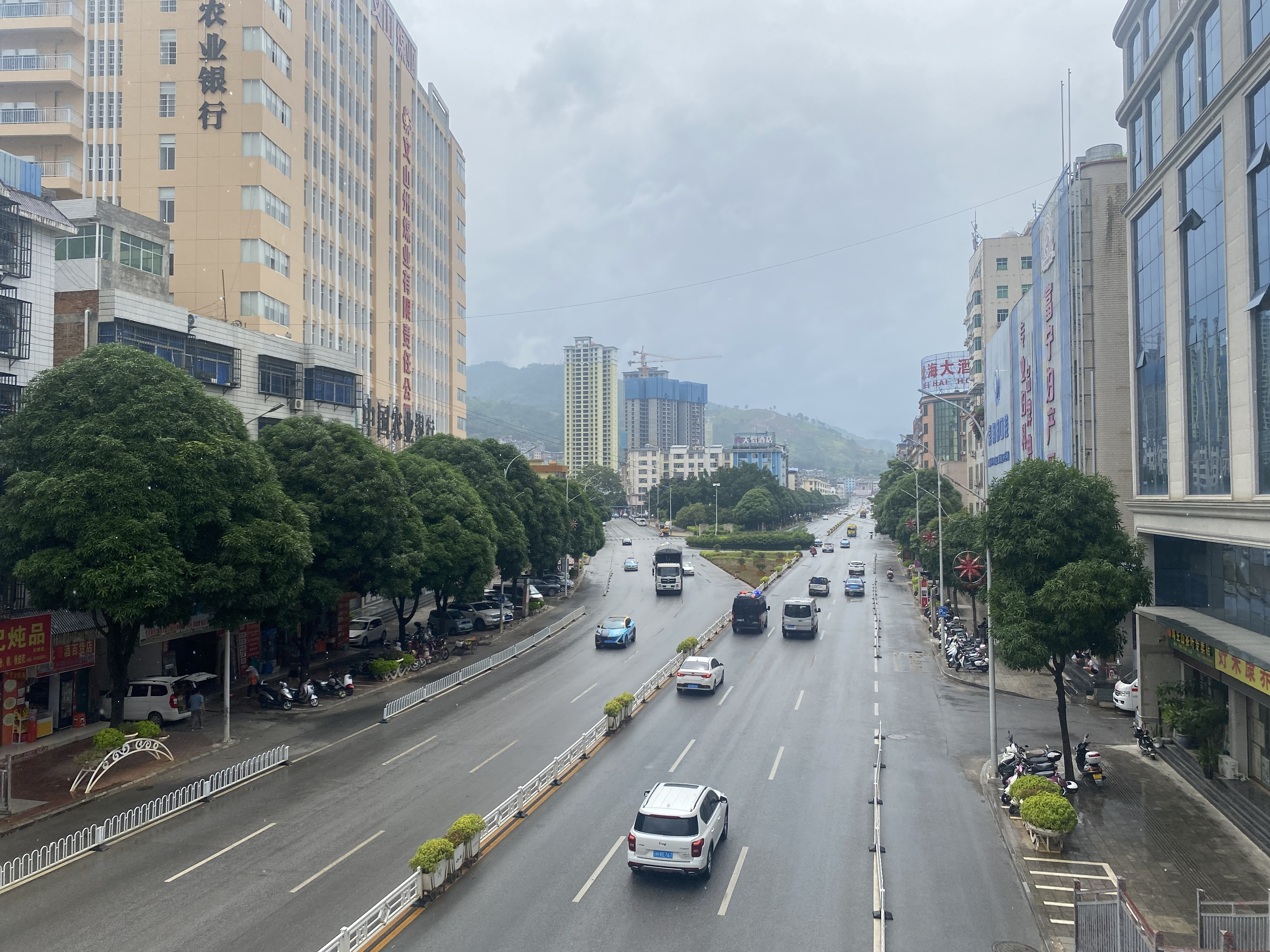
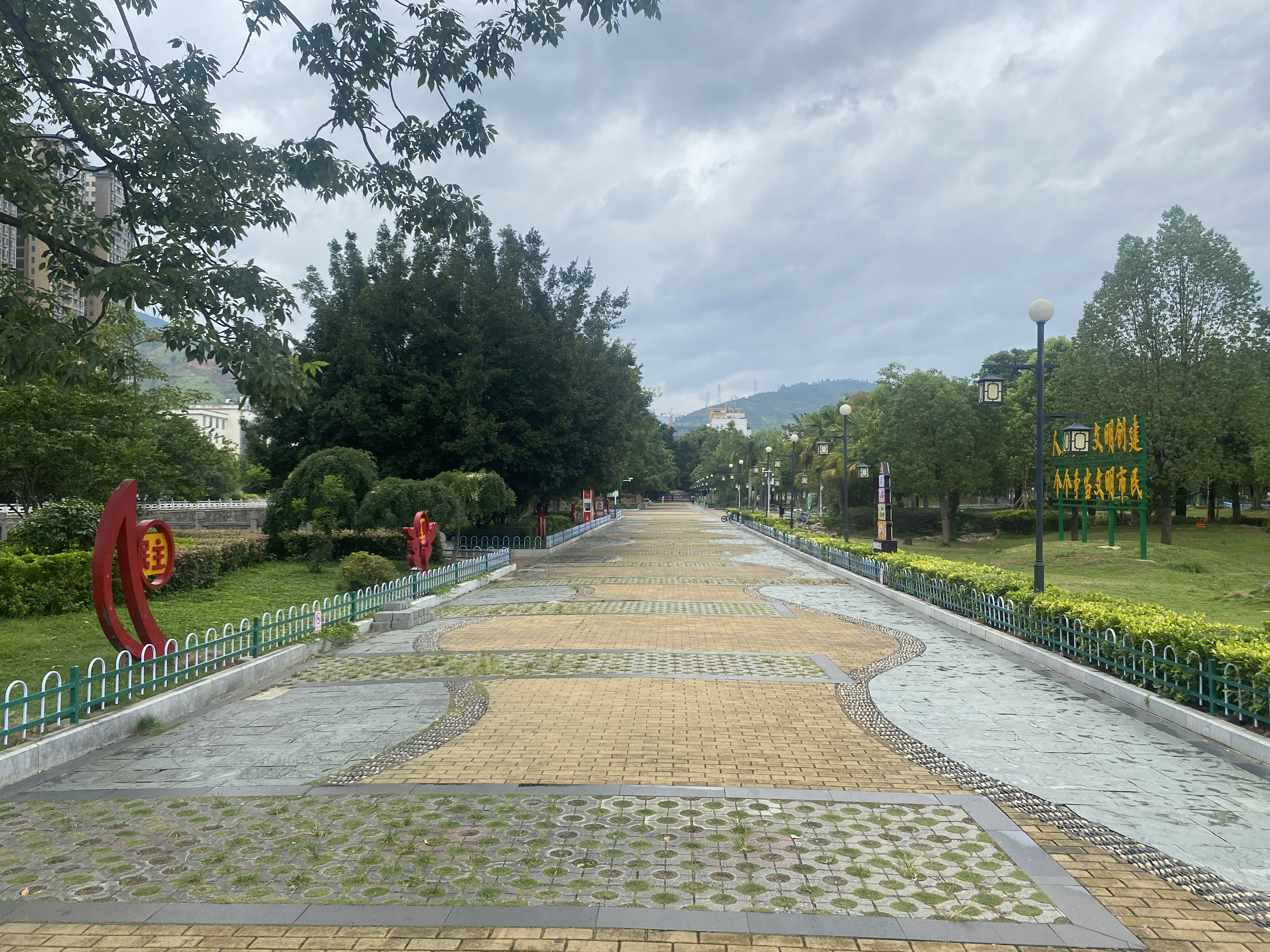
- Fuzhou Square Funing county hall Yingbin Road Baiyue Park

- Location of Funing County (red) and Wenshan Prefecture (pink) within Yunnan province

- Location of the seat in Yunnan
- Coordinates: 23°37′48″N 105°37′34″E
- Country: China
- Province: Yunnan
- Autonomous prefecture: Wenshan
- County seat: Xinhua

Area
  - Total: 5,352 km^{2} (2,066 sq mi)

Dimensions
  - Length: 108.78 km (67.59 mi)
  - Width: 109.89 km (68.28 mi)
- Highest elevation (Mount Muhong (木洪山)): 1,851 m (6,073 ft)
- Lowest elevation: 203 m (666 ft)

Population (2020 census)
  - Total: 396,818
  - Density: 74.14/km^{2} (192.0/sq mi)
- Time zone: UTC+8 (CST)
- Postal code: 663400
- Area code: 0876
- Website: www.ynfn.gov.cn

Funing County (simplified Chinese: 富宁县; traditional Chinese: 富寧縣; pinyin: Fùníng Xiàn; Zhuang language: Funingz Yen) is located in Wenshan Zhuang and Miao Autonomous Prefecture, in the southeast of Yunnan province, China. It is the easternmost county-level division of Yunnan, bordering Guangxi to the north, south and east, and Vietnam's Tuyên Quang province to the south.

== Geography ==
Funing is located in the east of Wenshan Prefecture. It borders Youjiang District and Jingxi, Guangxi to the east, Napo County, Guangxi to the south, Guangnan County to the west, Xilin County and Tianlin County of Guangxi to the north, and Malipo County across the Nanli River to the southwest. It also borders the Tuyên Quang province of Vietnam to the south.

== Administrative divisions ==
Funing County has 6 towns, 6 townships and 1 ethnic township.

6 towns

- Xinhua (新华镇)
- Guichao (归朝镇)
- Bo'ai (剥隘镇)
- Lida (里达镇)
- Tianpeng (田蓬镇)
- Muyang (木央镇)

6 townships

- Banlun (板仑乡)
- Gula (谷拉乡)
- Zhesang (者桑乡)
- Naneng (那能乡)
- Ayong (阿用乡)
- Huajia (花甲乡)

1 ethnic township

- Dongbo Yao Ethnic Township (洞波瑶族乡)

== Ethnic groups ==
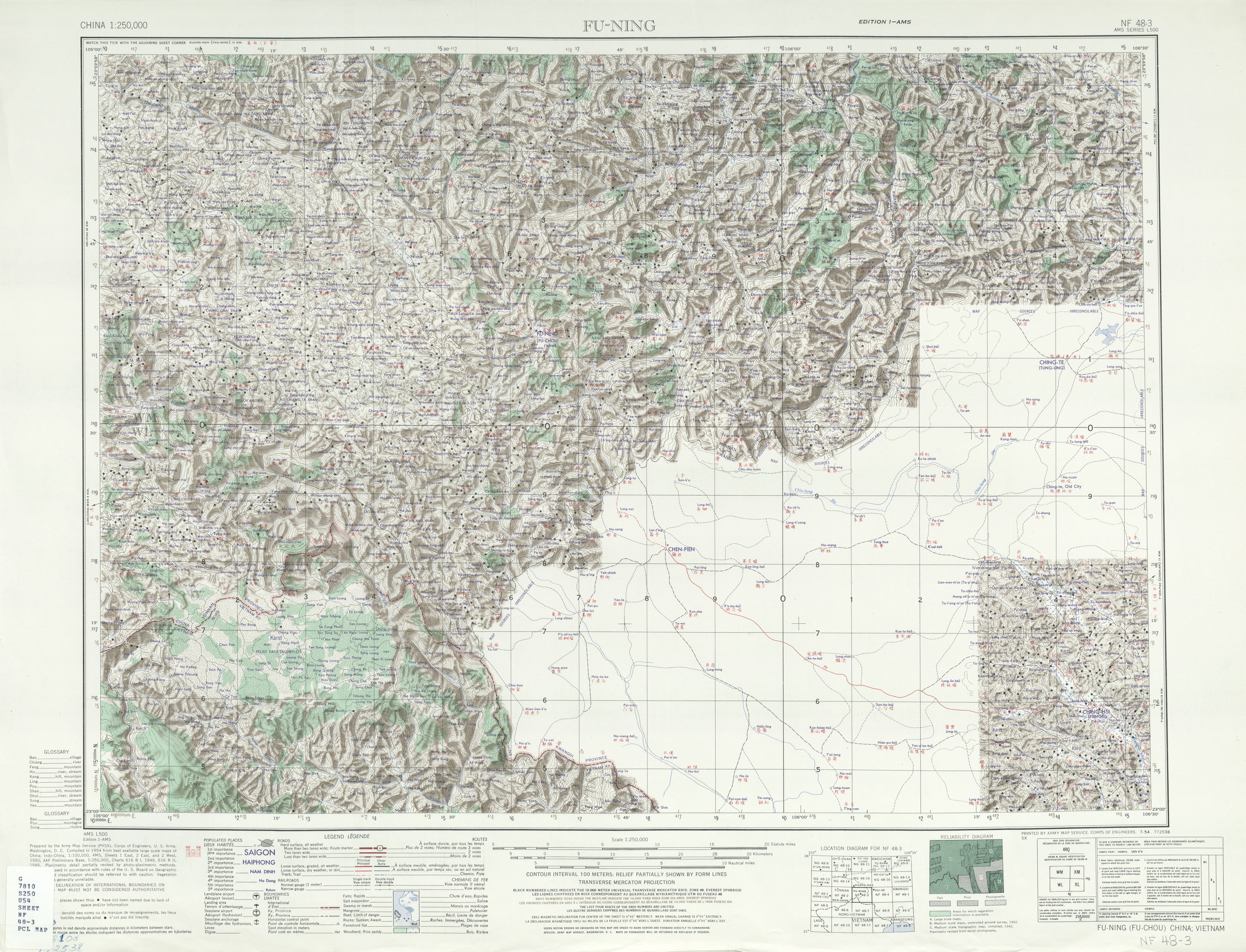
Map including Funing (labeled as FU-NING (FU-CHOU) (Walled) 富寧 (富州)) (AMS, 1954)

Ethnic groups of Funing County include the following. Population statistics are from 1990, and are sourced from the Funing County Ethnic Gazetteer 富宁县民族志 (1998).

- Han Chinese (84,337 people)
- Zhuang people (199,784 people, including the Buyang)
  - Min Zhuang
  - Dai Zhuang ("Dai Tho")
  - Yei Zhuang
- Buyang people
- Gelao people (121 people)
- Yi people (11,249 people)
- Miao people (24,414 people)
  - White Miao 白苗 (autonym: m̥oŋ⁴³de⁴³)
  - Lopsided Miao 偏苗 (autonym: m̥oŋ⁴³ʂua⁴⁴ 蒙刷)
  - Red Miao 红苗
- Yao people (36,591 people)
  - Landian [Blue Indigo] Yao 蓝靛瑶 (Kim Mun; autonym: kiːm¹¹muːn¹¹)
  - Daban [Large Board] Yao 大板瑶 (Iu Mien; autonym: jiu⁴²mien⁴²)
  - Shan [Mountain] Yao 山瑶 ("Buya 布亚"; autonym: pu⁵⁵ʐa¹¹)

The Zheyuan 蔗园 people of Dongbo 洞波 and Guichao 归朝, Funing County, are classified as ethnic Han (You 2013:290, 361-363). They numbered 1,033 persons as of 1960, and call themselves the "Yuexi people" (粤西人), while some also refer to themselves as the Buhong 布红. The Zheyuan people migrated from Xuanhua County 宣化县, Guangxi (currently the southern banks of the Yong River 邕江, in Nanning City, Guangxi) about 150 years ago. The Zheyuan people speak a Yue Chinese dialect.

=== Zhuang ===
The Funing County Ethnic Gazetteer (Lu and Nong 1998) identifies the following Zhuang subgroups.

- Butu (布土)
- Tianbao (天保)
- Bu’ao (布傲)
- Jiazhou (甲州)
- Longjiang (龙降)
- Mayang (麻央)
- Yangwu (洋乌)
- Buli (布俚)
- Buyei (布越)
- Long’an (隆安)
- Buyang (布央)

=== Yi ===
According to the Funing County Ethnic Gazetteer 富宁县民族志 (1998), ethnic Yi numbered 11,249 as of 1991, or 3.15% of the total county population. The Zhuang exonym for the Yi is Bùměng 布孟 (also Měngrén 孟人).

Yi subgroups of Funing County
Yi group (Chinese name)	Local names (autonyms, exonyms)	No. of villages
White Yi 白彝	Měngpiāo 孟瓢, Měngdǎi 蒙歹	59
Gāokùjiǎo White Yi 高裤脚白彝 (高白彝)	Měngkōng 蒙空, Měngpéng 蒙彭	13
Black Yi 黑彝	Měngnà 孟那, Měngjí 蒙吉, Měngxìn 蒙信	3
Flowery Yi 花彝	Měngyī 孟衣, Kèduǒ 克朵, Měngyóu 蒙尤	14
White Flowery Yi 白花彝	Měngbào 孟刨	1
Sinicized Yi 汉彝	Měnglàng 孟浪	2
Měngméi Lolo 孟梅倮	Měngtáng 孟堂, Kèliè 克列	?

There are 92 villages with ethnic Yi (in 38 administrative villages), consisting of 54 pure Yi villages and 38 ethnically mixed villages.

Yi subgroups by township
Township	Ethnic Yi population	Percentage within township	Ethnic Yi subgroups
Xīnhuá 新华乡	249	0.75%	Měngdǎi 蒙歹 (White Yi)
Bǎnlún 板仑乡	2,786	11.61%	Měngkōng 蒙空 (High-Trouser Yi)
Lǐdá 里达镇	1,293	6.02%	Měngdǎi 蒙歹 (White Yi), Měngkōng 蒙空 (High-Trouser Yi)
Mùlún 睦伦乡	1,774	10.11%	Měngdǎi 蒙歹 (White Yi)
Mùyāng 木央乡	3,454	12.47%	Měngdǎi 蒙歹 (White Yi), Kèliè 克列 (Mengmei Yi), Kèduǒ 克朵 (Flowery Yi), Měnglàng 孟浪 (Sinicized Yi), Měngjí 蒙吉 (Black Yi)

Ethnic Yi are found in the following villages of Funing County.

- Xinhua Township 新华乡
  - Gedang Village 格当村
- Banlun Township 板仑乡
  - Longyang Village 龙洋村
  - Longmai Village龙迈村
    - Mula 木腊
    - Zhegui 者归
    - Longzhong 龙中
    - Longxing 龙兴
    - Long'an 龙安
- Lida Township 里达镇
  - Ligong Village 里拱村
- Mulun Township 睦伦乡
- Muyang Township 木央乡
  - Mengmei, Puyang Village 普阳村孟梅
  - Mushu Village 木树村
  - Musang, Daping Village 大坪村木桑
  - Mugang Village 木杠村
- Tianpeng Township 田蓬镇

== Climate ==
Climate data for Funing, elevation 686 m (2,251 ft), (1991–2020 normals, extremes 1981–2010)
Month	Jan	Feb	Mar	Apr	May	Jun	Jul	Aug	Sep	Oct	Nov	Dec	Year
Record high °C (°F)	31.5 (88.7)	34.1 (93.4)	37.1 (98.8)	38.8 (101.8)	39.5 (103.1)	37.0 (98.6)	36.5 (97.7)	36.6 (97.9)	35.6 (96.1)	33.0 (91.4)	31.9 (89.4)	30.2 (86.4)	39.5 (103.1)
Mean daily maximum °C (°F)	17.4 (63.3)	20.2 (68.4)	24.3 (75.7)	28.4 (83.1)	30.3 (86.5)	31.0 (87.8)	31.3 (88.3)	31.1 (88.0)	29.4 (84.9)	26.1 (79.0)	23.2 (73.8)	18.7 (65.7)	26.0 (78.7)
Daily mean °C (°F)	12.0 (53.6)	14.3 (57.7)	18.1 (64.6)	22.3 (72.1)	24.7 (76.5)	25.9 (78.6)	26.0 (78.8)	25.2 (77.4)	23.5 (74.3)	20.5 (68.9)	16.8 (62.2)	12.8 (55.0)	20.2 (68.3)
Mean daily minimum °C (°F)	8.3 (46.9)	10.1 (50.2)	13.5 (56.3)	17.7 (63.9)	20.4 (68.7)	22.4 (72.3)	22.6 (72.7)	21.8 (71.2)	19.9 (67.8)	17.1 (62.8)	12.7 (54.9)	8.8 (47.8)	16.3 (61.3)
Record low °C (°F)	−1.3 (29.7)	0.0 (32.0)	0.7 (33.3)	8.1 (46.6)	9.9 (49.8)	13.6 (56.5)	14.9 (58.8)	16.0 (60.8)	11.0 (51.8)	6.0 (42.8)	0.7 (33.3)	−3.7 (25.3)	−3.7 (25.3)
Average precipitation mm (inches)	23.4 (0.92)	15.8 (0.62)	33.9 (1.33)	45.7 (1.80)	133.1 (5.24)	193.3 (7.61)	211.1 (8.31)	227.4 (8.95)	121.8 (4.80)	76.7 (3.02)	33.1 (1.30)	23.6 (0.93)	1,138.9 (44.83)
Average precipitation days (≥ 0.1 mm)	8.7	7.3	8.6	10.4	13.2	17.5	18.3	18.7	12.8	10.2	7.1	6.7	139.5
Average snowy days	0.2	0	0	0	0	0	0	0	0	0	0	0	0.2
Average relative humidity (%)	78	75	73	71	73	78	80	83	82	81	79	78	78
Mean monthly sunshine hours	98.9	115.1	139.5	162.9	168.7	134.2	147.6	155.5	139.2	117.8	134.6	115.0	1,629
Percentage possible sunshine	29	36	37	43	41	33	36	39	38	33	41	35	37
Source: China Meteorological Administration

== Transport ==
- Nearest airport: Wenshan Airport

== Historical sites ==
- Liuyi Hall of Elders 六宜村老人亭
- Poya Hall of Elders 坡芽村老人亭
- Guichao Old Town 归朝古镇
- The ancient village of Pingkun 坪坤村
