= Tai languages =

Branch of the Kra–Dai language family

Tai
- Zhuang–Tai, Daic
- Geographic distribution: Southern China (esp. Guangxi, Guizhou, Yunnan and Guangdong), Southeast Asia, Northeast India
- Linguistic classification: Kra–Dai: Kam–Tai?; Be–Tai?; Tai
- Proto-language: Proto-Tai
- Subdivisions: Northern (NT); Central (CT); Southwestern (SWT); (see also Zhuang languages)

Language codes
- ISO 639-2 / 5: tai
- Glottolog: daic1237
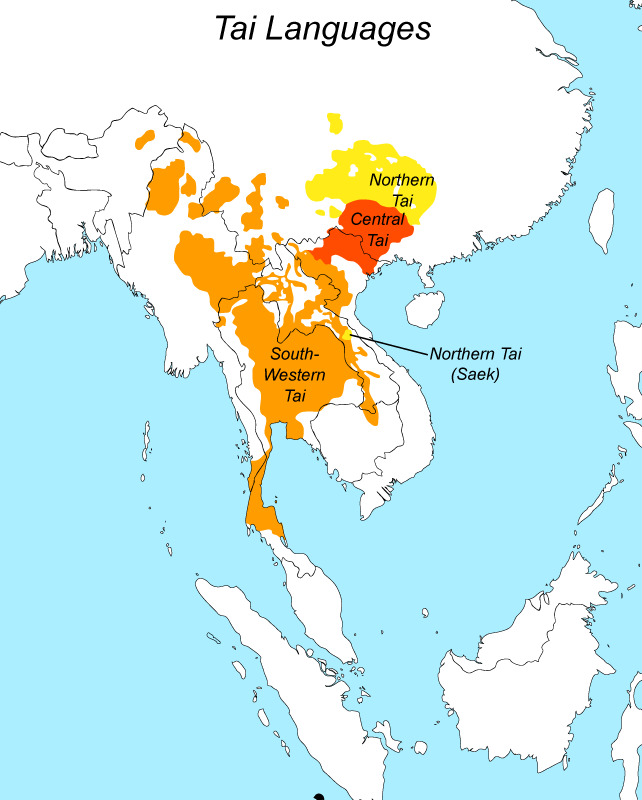
- Distribution of Tai languages: Northern Tai / Northern Zhuang Central Tai / Southern Zhuang Southwestern Tai / Thai

The Tai languages (/ˈtaɪ/ TIE), also known as Zhuang–Tai and Daic languages (/ˈdaɪ.ɪk/ DYE-ik), are a branch of the Kra–Dai language family. The Tai languages include the most widely spoken of the Tai–Kadai languages, including Standard Thai, or Siamese, the national language of Thailand; Lao or Laotian, the national language of Laos; Myanmar's Shan language; and Zhuang, a major language in the Southwestern China's Guangxi Zhuang Autonomous Region, spoken by the Zhuang people (壯), the largest minority ethnic group in China, with a population of 15.55 million, living mainly in Guangxi, the rest scattered across Yunnan, Guangdong, Guizhou, and Hunan provinces.

== Name ==
Cognates with the name Tai (Thai, Dai, etc.) are used by speakers of many Tai languages. The term Tai is now well-established as the generic name in English. In his book The Tai-Kadai Languages, Anthony Diller claims that Lao scholars he has met are not pleased with Lao being regarded as a Tai language. For some, Thai should instead be considered a member of the Lao language family. One or more Ancient Chinese characters for 'Lao' may be cited in support of this alternative appellation. Some scholars, including Benedict (1975), have used Thai to refer to a wider (Tai) grouping and one sees designations like proto-Thai and Austro-Thai in earlier works. In the institutional context in Thailand, and occasionally elsewhere, sometimes Tai (and its corresponding Thai-script spelling, without a final -y symbol) is used to indicate varieties in the language family not spoken in Thailand or spoken there only as the result of recent immigration. In this usage, Thai would not then be considered a Tai language. On the other hand, Gedney, Li and others have preferred to call the standard language of Thailand Siamese rather than Thai, perhaps to reduce potential Thai/Tai confusion, especially among English speakers not comfortable with making a word-initial unaspirated voiceless sound for Tai, which in any event might sound artificial or arcane to outsiders.

According to Michel Ferlus, the ethnonyms Tai/Thai (or Tay/Thay) would have evolved from the etymon *k(ə)ri: 'human being' through the following chain: kəri: > kəli: > kədi:/kədaj (-l- > -d- shift in tense sesquisyllables and probable diphthongization of -i: > -aj). This in turn changed to di:/daj (presyllabic truncation and probable diphthongization -i: > -aj). And then to *daj^{A} (Proto-Southwestern Tai) > tʰaj^{A2} (in Siamese and Lao) or > taj^{A2} (in the other Southwestern and Central Tai languages by Li Fangkuei). Michel Ferlus' work is based on some simple rules of phonetic change observable in the Sinosphere and studied for the most part by William H. Baxter (1992).

The Central Tai languages are called Zhuang in China and Tay and Nung in Vietnam.

== History ==
Map showing linguistic family tree overlaid on a geographic distribution map of the Tai family. This map only shows the general pattern of the migration of Tai-speaking tribes, not specific routes, which would have snaked along the rivers and over the lower passes.

Citing the fact that both the Zhuang and Thai peoples have the same exonym for the Vietnamese, kɛɛu^{A1}, (Note: A1 designates a tone.) derived from the name of Jiaozhi in Vietnam, and that the indigenous Bai Yue were given family names by their northern rulers during the Northern and Southern dynasties, while the Thai didn't have family names into the 19th century, Jerold A. Edmondson of the University of Texas at Arlington posited that the split between Zhuang (a Central Tai language) and the Southwestern Tai languages happened no earlier than the founding of Jiaozhi in 112 BCE but no later than the 5th–6th century AD. Based on layers of Chinese loanwords in Proto-Southwestern Tai and other historical evidence, Pittayawat Pittayaporn (2014) suggests that the dispersal of Southwestern Tai must have begun sometime between the 8th and 10th centuries AD.

=== Connection to ancient Yue language(s) ===
The Tai languages descend from proto-Kra–Dai, which has been hypothesized to originate in the Lower Yangtze valleys. Ancient Chinese texts refer to non-Sinitic languages spoken across this substantial region and their speakers as "Yue". Although those languages are extinct, traces of their existence could be found in unearthed inscriptional materials, ancient Chinese historical texts and non-Han substrata in various Southern Chinese dialects. Thai, as the most-spoken language in the Tai-Kadai language family, has been used extensively in historical-comparative linguistics to identify the origins of language(s) spoken in the ancient region of South China. One of the very few direct records of non-Sinitic speech in pre-Qin and Han times having been preserved so far is the "Song of the Yue Boatman" (Yueren Ge 越人歌), which was transcribed phonetically in Chinese characters in 528 BC, and found in the 善說 Shanshuo chapter of the Shuoyuan 說苑 or 'Garden of Persuasions'. In the early 1980s the Zhuang linguist Wei Qingwen using reconstructed Old Chinese for the characters discovered that the resulting vocabulary showed strong resemblance to modern Zhuang. Later, Zhengzhang Shangfang (1991) followed Wei's insight but used Thai orthography for comparison, since this orthography dates from the 13th century and preserves archaisms vis-à-vis the modern pronunciation.

== Internal classification ==
=== Haudricourt (1956) ===
Haudricourt emphasizes the specificity of Dioi (Zhuang) and proposes to make a two-way distinction between the following two sets. The original language names used in Haudricourt's (1956) are provided first; alternative names are given in parentheses.

- Tai
  - Dioi group: Yei Zhuang, Yongbei Zhuang, Youjiang Zhuang, Bouyei (Buyi)
  - Tai proper: Ahom, Shan, Siamese (Thai), Lao, White Tai (Tai Dón), Black Tai (Tai Dam), Southern Zhuang, Tho (Tày), Nung

Characteristics of the Dioi group pointed out by Haudricourt are

- r- corresponding to the lateral l- in the other Tai languages,
- divergent vowel system characteristics, e.g. 'tail' has an /a/ vowel in Tai proper, as against /ə̄/ in Bo-ai, /iə/ in Tianzhou, and /ɯə/ in Tianzhou and Wuming, and
- the lack of aspirated stops and affricates, which are found everywhere in Tai proper.

=== Li (1977) ===
Li Fang-Kuei divided Tai into three sister branches.

- Tai
  - Northern Tai
  - Central Tai
  - Southwestern Tai (Thai)

Li's Northern group corresponds to Haudricourt's Dioi group, while his Central and Southwestern groups correspond to Haudricourt's Tai proper. The three last languages in Haudricourt's list of 'Tai proper' languages are Tho (Tày), Longzhou, and Nung, which Li classifies as 'Central Tai'.

This classification scheme has long been accepted as standard in comparative Tai linguistics. However, Central Tai does not appear to be a monophyletic group.

=== Gedney (1989) ===
Gedney (1989) considers Central and Southwestern Tai to form a subgroup, of which Northern Tai is a sister. The top-level branching is in agreement with Haudricourt (1956).

- Tai
  - Northern Tai
    - Central Tai
    - Southwestern Tai

=== Luo (1997) ===
Luo Yongxian (1997) classifies the Tai languages as follows, introducing a fourth branch called Northwestern Tai that includes Ahom, Shan, Dehong Dai, and Khamti. All branches are considered to be coordinate to each other.

- Tai
  - Northern Tai
  - Central Tai
  - Southwestern Tai
  - Northwestern Tai

=== Pittayaporn (2009) ===
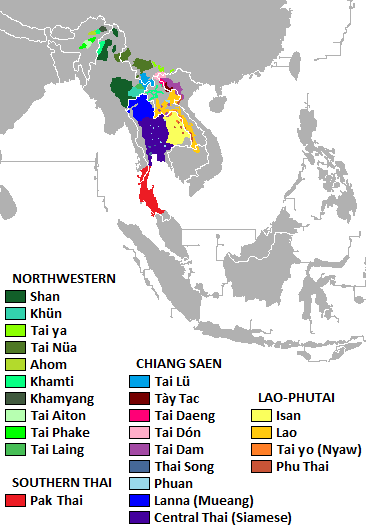
Southwestern Tai languages

==== Overview ====
Pittayawat Pittayaporn (2009) classifies the Tai languages based on clusters of shared innovations (which, individually, may be associated with more than one branch) (Pittayaporn 2009:298). In Pittayaporn's preliminary classification system of the Tai languages, Central Tai is considered to be paraphyletic and is split up into multiple branches, with the Zhuang varieties of Chongzuo in southwestern Guangxi (especially in the Zuo River valley at the border to Vietnam) having the most internal diversity. The Southwestern Tai and Northern Tai branches remain intact as in Li Fang-Kuei's 1977 classification system, and several of the Southern Zhuang languages allocated ISO codes are considered to be paraphyletic. The classification is as follows.

- Tai
  - D: Northern Tai
    - I: Qinzhou Zhuang (Yongnan Zhuang of Qinzhou)
    - J
      - M: Wuming Zhuang, Yongnan Zhuang, Long'an Zhuang, Fusui
      - N: Core Northern Tai: Saek, Bouyei, Yay, Youjiang Zhuang and others
  - C: Chongzuo Zhuang (Yongnan Zhuang of Chongzuo), Shangsi Zhuang (Yongnan Zhuang of Shangsi), Caolan (Vietnam)
  - B: Ningming Zhuang (Zuojiang Zhuang of Ningming)
  - A
    - F: Lungchow Zhuang, Leiping Zhuang
    - E
      - H: Lungming Zhuang, Daxin Zhuang
      - G
        - L (Nung): Yang Zhuang of Debao, Yang Zhuang of Jingxi, (Western) Nung of Mường Khương District, Nong Zhuang of Wenshan City), Nong Zhuang of Yanshan
        - K
          - P (Tay): Tày of Bảo Yên, Tày of Cao Bằng, Dai Zhuang of Wenma (文麻)
          - O
            - R: Sapa (Vietnam)
            - Q: Southwestern Tai (Laos, Thailand, Burma)

Standard Zhuang is based on the dialect of Shuangqiao (双桥), Wuming District.

Sites surveyed in Zhang (1999), subgrouped according to Pittayaporn (2009): N, M, I, C, B, F, H, L, P

==== Sound changes ====
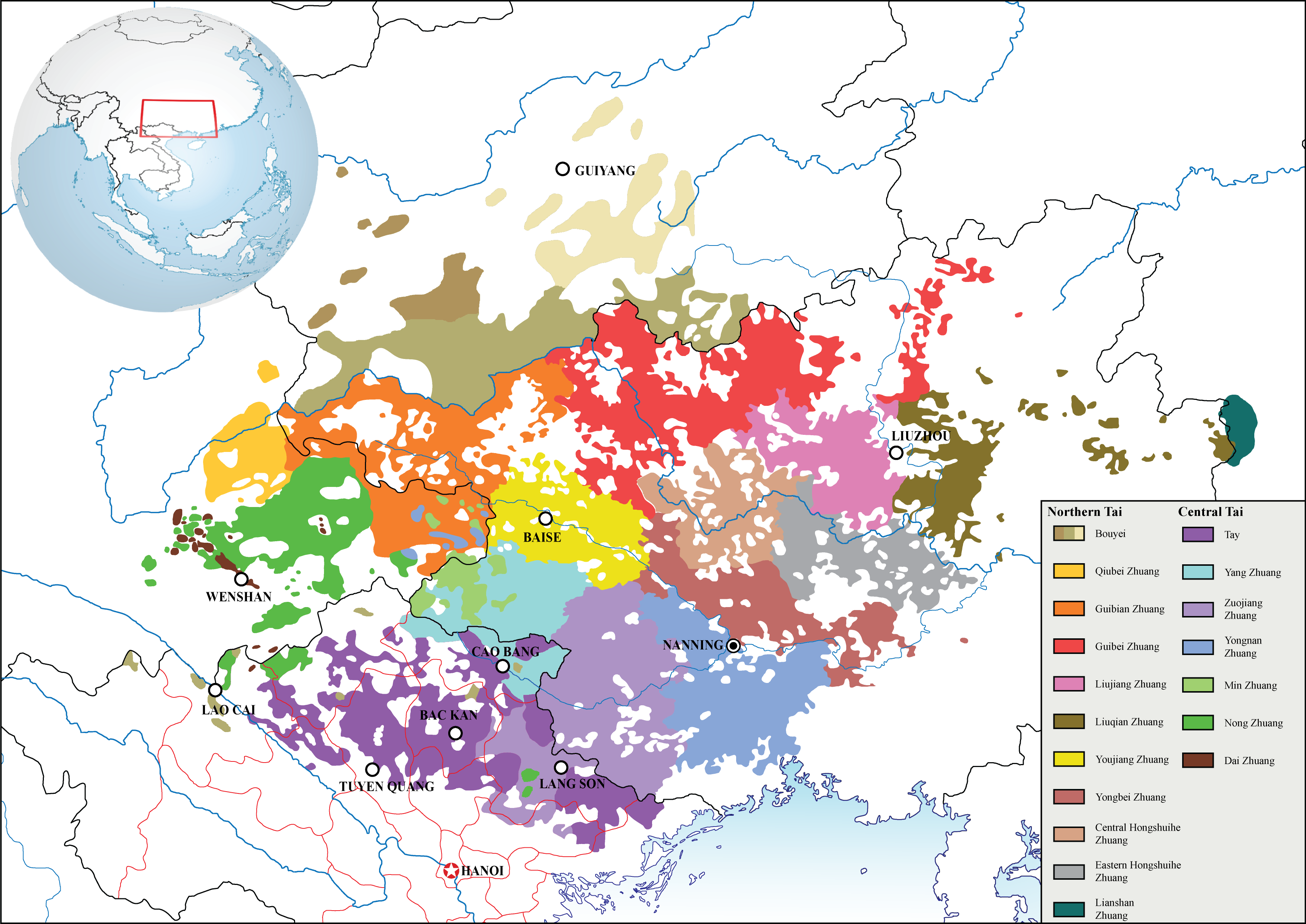
Distribution of Central and Northern Tai languages (Zhuang, Tay-Nung and Bouyei included)

The following phonological shifts occurred in the Q (Southwestern), N (Northern), B (Ningming), and C (Chongzuo) subgroups (Pittayaporn 2009:300–301).

Proto-Tai reflexes
| Proto-Tai | Subgroup Q (Note: Unless indicated otherwise, all phonological shifts occurred at the primary level (node A).) | Subgroup N (Note: Unless indicated otherwise, all phonological shifts occurred at the primary level (node D).) | Subgroup B | Subgroup C |
|---|---|---|---|---|
| *ɤj, *ɤw, *ɤɰ | *aj, *aw, *aɰ | *i:, *u:, *ɯ: | *i:, *u:, *ɯ: | – |
| *ɯj, *ɯw | *iː, *uː (Note: Also, the *ɯːk > *uːk shift occurred at node A.) | *aj, *aw (Note: Innovation at node N.) | *iː, *uː | – |
| *we, *wo | *eː, *oː | *iː, *uː | *eː, *oː (Note: For node B, the affected Proto-Tai syllable was *weː, *woː.) | *eː, *oː (Note: For node C, the affected Proto-Tai syllable was *weː, *woː.) |
| *ɟm̩.r- | *br- | *ɟr- | – | *ɟr- |
| *k.t- | – | *tr- | – | *tr- |
| *ɤn, *ɤt, *ɤc | – | *an, *at, *ac (Note: Innovation at node J.) | – | – |

Furthermore, the following shifts occurred at various nodes leading up to node Q.

- E: *p.t- > *p.r-; *ɯm > *ɤm
- G: *k.r- > *qr-
- K: *eː, *oː > *ɛː, *ɔː
- O: *ɤn > *on
- Q: *kr- > *ʰr-

=== Edmondson (2013) ===
Jerold A. Edmondson's (2013) computational phylogenetic analysis of the Tai languages is shown below. Tay and Nung are both shown to be coherent branches under Central Tai. Northern Tai and Southwestern Tai are also shown to be coherent branches.

- Tai
  - Northern Tai: Buyi, Yay, Po-Ai, Wuming Zhuang, Mashan Zhuang
    - Central Tai
      - core Central Tai: Nung Chau, Pingxiang Zhuang, Leiping Zhuang, Ningming Zhuang
      - Nung: Western Nung, Nung Yang, Nung An, Thu Lao
      - Tay: Tay Bao Lac, Tay Khanh Trung, Cao Lan
    - Southwestern Tai: Ahom, Shan, Dehong, Tai Theeng (Nghe An), Black Tai, White Tai, Padi, Lao, Thai

== Reconstruction ==
Proto-Tai has been reconstructed in 1977 by Li Fang-Kuei and by Pittayawat Pittayaporn in 2009. Proto-Southwestern Tai has also been reconstructed in 1977 by Li Fang-Kuei and by Nanna L. Jonsson in 1991.

Others have taken up specific area reconstructions, such as David Strecker's 1984 work regarding "Proto-Tai Personal Pronouns." Strecker's proposed system of personal pronouns in Proto-Tai involves "three numbers, three persons, an inclusive/exclusive distinction and an animate/non-animate distinction in the third person non-singular."

Proto-Tai Pronouns
| | | Proto-Tai | Thai alphabet |
| 1st | singular | *ku | กู |
| 1st | dual (exclusive) | *pʰɯa | เผือ |
| 1st | plural (exclusive) | *tu | ตู |
| Incl. | dual (inclusive) | *ra | รา |
| Incl. | plural (inclusive) | *rau | เรา |
| 2nd | singular | *mɯŋ | มึง |
| 2nd | dual | *kʰɯa | เขือ |
| 2nd | plural | *su | สู |
| 3rd | singular | *man | มัน |
| 3rd | dual | *kʰa | ขา |
| 3rd | plural | *kʰau | เขา |

== Comparison ==
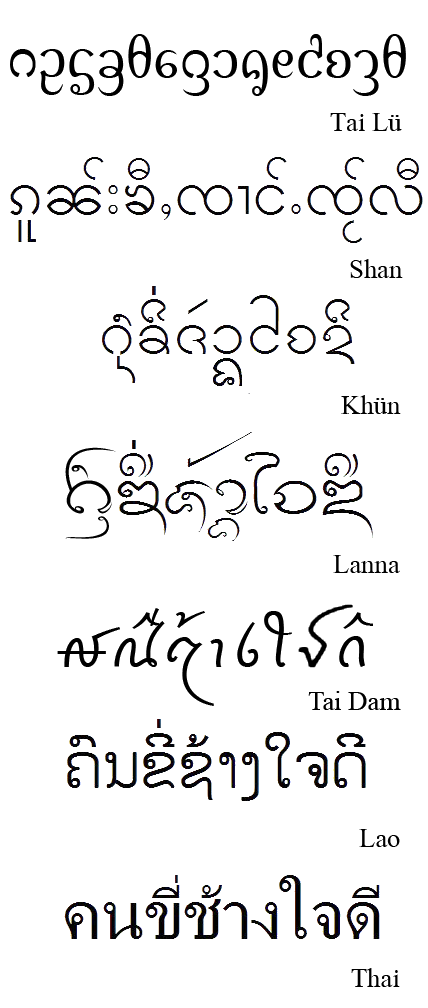
Tai alphabets. The phrase is kind elephant rider.

Below is comparative table of Tai languages.

| English | Proto-Tai | Thai | Lao | Northern Thai | Shan | Tai Lü | Standard Zhuang | Ahom |
|---|---|---|---|---|---|---|---|---|
| wind | *C̬.lɯmᴬ | /lōm/ | /lóm/ | /lōm/ | /lóm/ | /lôm/ | /ɣum˧˩/ | lum |
| town | *mɯəŋ^{A} | /mɯ̄aŋ/ | /mɯ́aŋ/ | /mɯ̄aŋ/ | /mɤ́ŋ/ | /mɤ̂ŋ/ | /mɯŋ˧/ | mvng |
| earth | *ɗinᴬ | /dīn/ | /dìn/ | /dīn/ | /lǐn/ | /dín/ | /dei˧/ | nin |
| fire | *wɤj^{A} | /fāj/ | /fáj/ | /fāj/ | /pʰáj/ or /fáj/ | /fâj/ | /fei˧˩/ | phai |
| heart | *cɤɰ^{A} | /hǔa tɕāj/ | /hǔa tɕàj/ | /hǔa tɕǎj/ | /hǒ tsǎɰ/ | /hó tɕáj/ | /sim/ | chau |
| water | *C̬.namꟲ | /náːm/ | /nâm/ | /nám/ | /nâm/ | /nà̄m/ | /ɣaem˦˨/ | nam |

== Writing systems ==
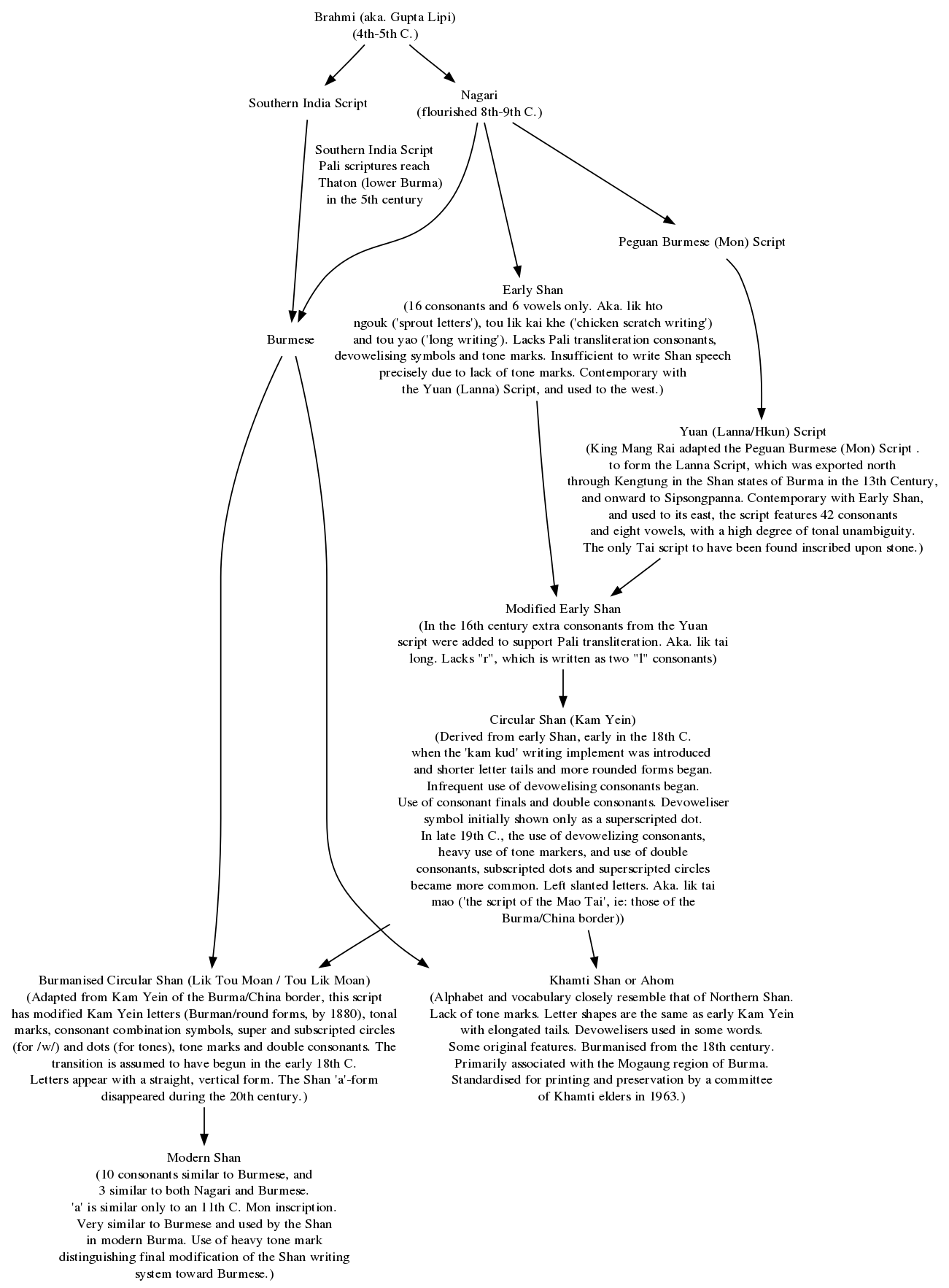
Graphical summary of the development of Tai scripts from a Shan perspective, as reported in Sai Kam Mong's Shan Script book.

Many Southwestern Tai languages are written using Brahmi-derived alphabets. Zhuang languages are traditionally written with Chinese characters called Sawndip, and now officially written with a romanized alphabet, though the traditional writing system is still in use to this day.

- Thai script
- Lao script
- Sawndip
- Shan script
- Ahom script
- Tai Viet script
- Tai Le script
- New Tai Lue alphabet
- Tai Tham script

== See also ==
- Miscellaneous Tai languages
- Zomia (region)
