= Zhuang people =

Tai-speaking ethnic group of Southern China

壮族 Bouxcuengh (佈獞)
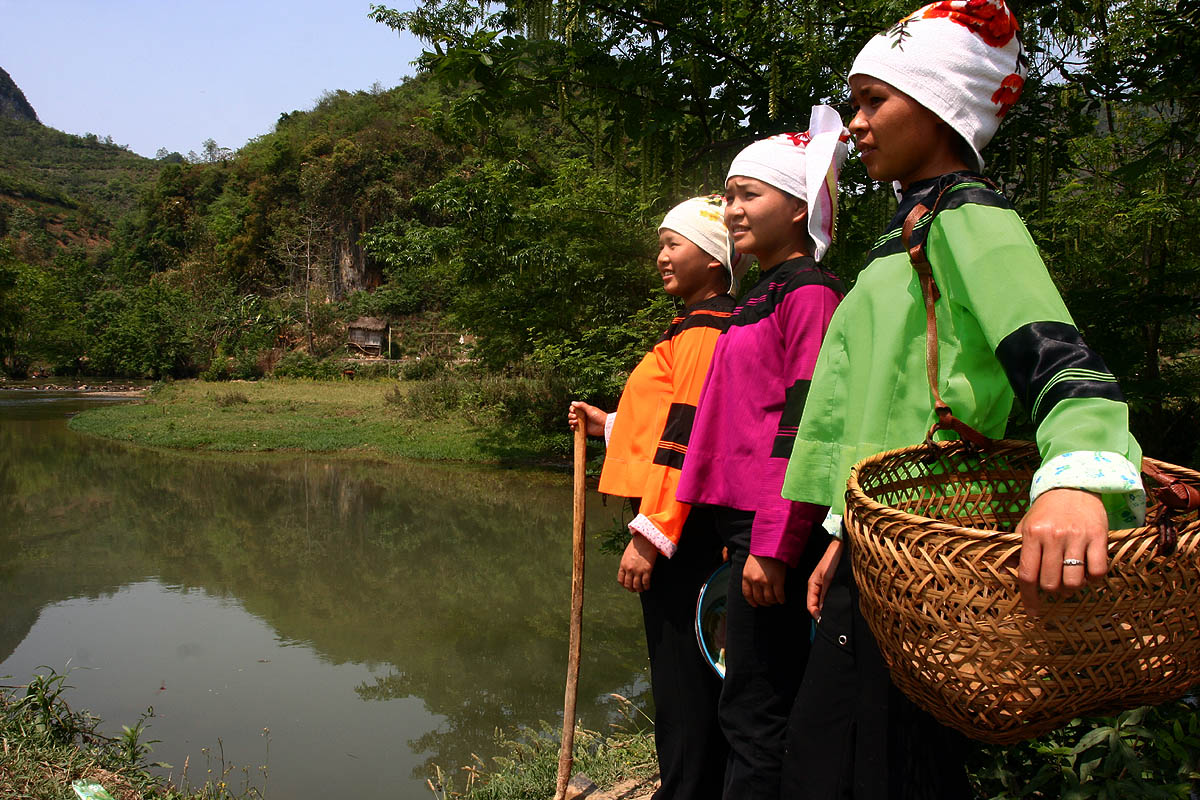
- Zhuang people in ethnic clothes, Guangnan, 2008

Total population
- 19 million

Regions with significant populations
- China (mainly in Guangxi): 19,568,546 (2020 census)

Languages
- Zhuang languages, Cantonese, Mandarin, Pinghua

Religion
- Majority: Mo; Minority: Buddhism; Christianity; Islam; Taoism

Related ethnic groups
- Bouyei, Dai, Nùng, and Tày

Zhuang people

Chinese name
- Simplified Chinese: 壮族 or 僮族
- Traditional Chinese: 壯族 or 僮族
- Hanyu Pinyin: Zhuàngzú
Transcriptions
Standard Mandarin
- Hanyu Pinyin: Zhuàngzú
- Bopomofo: ㄓㄨㄤˋ ㄗㄨˊ
- Gwoyeu Romatzyh: Juanqtzwu
- Wade–Giles: Chuang^{4}-tsu^{2}
- Yale Romanization: Jwàngdzú
- IPA: [ʈʂwâŋ.tsǔ]
Wu
- Romanization: zaon zoh
Hakka
- Romanization: Tsong-tshu̍k
Yue: Cantonese
- Jyutping: Zong3 zuk6
Southern Min
- Hokkien POJ: Chàng-cho̍k
- Teochew Peng'im: Tsàng-tsôk
Eastern Min
- Fuzhou BUC: Cáung-cŭk

Sawndip autonym
- Chinese: 佈僮
- Hanyu Pinyin: Bùzhuàng
Transcriptions
Standard Mandarin
- Hanyu Pinyin: Bùzhuàng
- IPA: [pû.ʈʂwâŋ]

Zhuang name
- Zhuang: Bouxcuengh (pronounced /pou˦˨ ɕueŋ˧/)

The Zhuang (/ˈdʒwæŋ, ˈdʒwɒŋ/; Chinese: 壮族; pinyin: Zhuàngzú; Zhuang: Bouxcuengh, [poːu˦˨ ɕeŋ˧], Sawndip: 佈獞) are a Tai-speaking ethnic group who mostly live in the Guangxi Zhuang Autonomous Region in Southern China. Some also live in the Yunnan, Guangdong, Guizhou, and Hunan provinces. They form one of the 56 ethnic groups officially recognized by the People's Republic of China. With the Bouyei, Nùng, Tày, and other Northern Tai speakers, they are sometimes known as the Rau or Rao people. Their population, estimated at 19 million people, makes them the largest minority in China.

== Etymology ==
The Chinese character used for the Zhuang people has changed several times. Their autonym, "Cuengh" in Standard Zhuang, was originally written with the graphic pejorative Zhuàng, 獞 (or tóng, referring to a variety of wild dog). Chinese characters typically combine a semantic element or radical and a phonetic element. John DeFrancis recorded that Zhuàng was previously Tóng, 獞, with "dog radical" 犭 and tóng, 童 phonetic, a slur, but also describes how the People's Republic of China eventually removed it. In 1949, after the Chinese civil war, the logograph 獞 was officially replaced with a different graphic pejorative, 僮 (Zhuàng or tóng, meaning "child; boy servant"), with the "human radical" 亻with the same phonetic. Later 僮 was changed to a different character Zhuàng, 壮 (meaning "strong; robust").

== Relationship to the Nùng and Tày ==
The Zhuang, Nùng, and Tày people are a cluster of Tai peoples with very similar customs and dress known as the Rau peoples. In China, the Zhuang are today the largest non-Han Chinese minority with around 14.5 million population in Guangxi Province alone. In Vietnam, as of 1999, there were 933,653 Nùng people and 1,574,822 Tày people. Recently the Tày and Nùng have been referred to as a combined Tày-Nùng minority. However these ethnonyms are a recent phenomenon and did not exist until the modern age. According to Keith Taylor, the Vietnamese terms were "categories of French colonial knowledge" used to differentiate highlanders from lowlanders. The ethnic Zhuang was a product of the "ethnic identification project" pursued in 1950s China.

Although both Vietnamese and Chinese authorities labeled all of the local inhabitants "barbarians of the South" (Man), there were many distinct communities throughout this region. The majority belonged to a single Tai-speaking ethnicity, the Chinese Zhuang (or Vietnamese Nùng) ethnic group.

— James Anderson

Many scholars of the Tai peoples consider the Zhuang and Nùng to be essentially the same people, a single ethnic group. During the early 11th century, ethnic identities and boundaries were more fluid than in the modern Sino-Vietnamese borderland. The Zhuang leader Nong Zhigao was defeated in 1055 by the Song dynasty. Had he won, it is possible that he might have established a state under his own clan name, Nong. Instead, his people in China continued to be referred to as Zhuang, which in their own language means "cave", while in Vietnam they came to be known as Nùng. The majority ethnic group and now the largest minority, however, was and still is the same, the Zhuang/Nùng, who together number more than 15 million people. They are just recognized by different names in China and Vietnam. Nong Zhigao (V. Nùng Trí Cao) has sometimes been claimed by Vietnam as a Vietnamese native, but this is due to antagonism with modern China, while in previous times the Vietnamese sometimes saw him as primarily Chinese.

=== Identity ===
Some ethnologists such as George Moseley, Diana Lary, Katherine Kaup, and Jeffrey Barlow view the Zhuang ethnicity as a modern constructed ethnic identity. In the eyes of the ethnologists, the Zhuang culture was not sufficiently divergent from what the ethnologists considered "Han culture", to warrant recognition as a separate ethnic identity. The Zhuang had been interacting with the Han Chinese for over 2,200 years. As early as the Han dynasty (202 BC–220 AD), the Zhuang adopted Han cultural practices and technology such as settled agriculture, iron plows, triple cropping, and fertilization. They lived at lower elevations than other minority groups and competed more directly with Han farmers than slash-and-burn agriculturalists. As direct competitors, the Zhuang found it expedient to adopt Han dress and housing styles. After the defeat of the Zhuang leader, Nong Zhigao, in 1055, many Zhuang families and communities gave up their own language and names and completely assimilated into the Han majority.

In one instance, a Zhuang student said that he had previously regarded himself as Han Chinese before being taught that he was Zhuang. The Zhuang did not perceive themselves as marginalized or in need of promotion. Zhuang peasants displayed resistance to the ideal of a formal Romanized Zhuang script, noting that they had used Han script for centuries. Formal classification of the Zhuang also ignored historical similarities between northern Zhuang and the Bouyei people.

Guangxi has a type of people called "local people" who are widely spread across the province ... They rather refer to themselves as "Han who speak the Zhuang language." ... Since the language they speak is generally called Zhuang, we recommend calling them Zhuang. The Zhuang are a relatively large Chinese southern minority, but we still know little about them. I ... hope that scholars with more expertise on nationality history will offer us their assistance, and in this way move towards a better understanding of these people.

— Fei Xiaotong, leader of the project of ethnic classification, 1952

== History ==
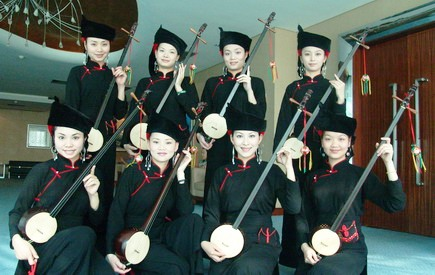
Zhuang woman musicians in Longzhou.

=== Origins ===
The Zhuang are the indigenous peoples of Guangxi, according to Huang Xianfan. The Zhuang's origins can be traced back to the Paleolithic, as demonstrated by a large amount of contemporary archaeological evidence.

=== Tang-Song transition ===
From 823 to 826, the Zhuang, Huang, and Nong clans, aided by raiders from Champa, attacked Yongzhou and seized 18 counties. The "Nung Grottoes" sought aid from Nanzhao.

During the Huang Chao rebellion (874–884), the Zhuang took part in anti-rebel efforts as irregular units in the Ningyuan Army led by Pang Zhuzhao. After the collapse of the Tang dynasty in 907, the Southern Han recruited Zhuang archers to outfit its riverine forces. They took part in campaigns against Ma Chu.

The Zhuang do not seem to have aspired to creating an empire after the collapse of the Tang and sought merely autonomy. In fact the opposite seemed to have occurred and the wars in the south drew more Zhuang into contact with Han Chinese as they were sought after as mercenary troops and river porters.

=== Song ===
==== Administration ====
The Song dynasty continued the Jimi system of the Tang dynasty and named the officials of those jimi prefectures zhi. So the ruler of Nandan was called "Zhi Nandan". The Zhuang people were governed under this system but not the Yao people, who were far less numerous. Zhuang leaders sought Song approval to legitimate their position. After being recognized, they also received a salary and their family was guaranteed hereditary succession to the post. Song authority was bestowed through seals, which theoretically went to the hereditary leader, but in practice usually went to the claimant put forward by the locals, often after military conflicts. When there was no obvious heir, the seals often went to the wife of the deceased, whose accession to the post became customary. In theory the Song court could replace recalcitrant leaders like an ordinary official, but in practice this power was weighed against the cost to maintain tranquillity among the Zhuang and stability on the Sino-Viet border. As a result, Jimi rulers who were disobedient were usually sufficiently powerful to refuse replacement as well.

Zhuang jimi prefectures were essentially feudal. Land was held by lesser families in perpetuity and could not be sold or transferred. As a result the Zhuang habitually entered military service under the Han Chinese to seek new land, often at the expense of other minorities such as the Yao people. Han Chinese were forbidden from buying Zhuang land or to engage in commercial activity within their jimi districts. However Zhuang-Han marriages were allowed, resulting in land titles that were nominally Zhuang held but had been subsumed under Han administration. The jimi prefectures paid a tax that was usually more a customary and semi-voluntary exaction in practice, though this depended upon the power of the lord. Even when taxed, it was at a lower rate than that of regular prefectures. Many jimi prefectures did not pay taxes but "tribute." The Mo clan paid 100 ounces of silver as tribute annually.

It is evident that the headmen entered into the tribute system with great enthusiasm. As part of the practice of paying tribute they could periodically journey to the capital and be treated as a foreign ambassador, with all of the opportunities for tourism and trade which this presented. As a consequence, headmen frequently petitioned to pay tribute more frequently than they were obliged to, and to increase the size of their deputation when doing so. Because the court actually paid for the expenses of travel, it was regarded as an unnecessary expense to permit overly frequent visits, and such requests were usually refused.

— Jeffrey Barlow

The jimi prefectures often engaged in petty squabbles that escalated to military conflict. At one point the Mo clan of Nandan pillaged each other over the ownership of an ox before Song authorities settled the matter. Such small scale conflicts were frequent and Song authorities preferred to remain uninvolved and avoided confrontation when possible.

==== Military conflicts ====
The Zhuang provided the Song dynasty with river transportation during the Song conquest of Southern Han (970–971). Some 20,000 Zhuang also fought for Southern Han but they were defeated. Afterwards, the Mo clan of Nandan submitted to Song authority in 974 and the Meng clan of Yizhou rebelled in 1038 but was put down.

In 980, the Zhuang participated in the Song–Đại Cồ Việt war as Song allies, however the expedition ended in defeat.

In 1000, the Zhuang attacked Yongzhou but the attack was quelled by Zhuang troops of the Song-allied Huang clan.

In 1001, Zhuang calling themselves the Troops of Chen (chenbing) rebelled in Yizhou. Their leader, Su Chengzhun, titled himself King of the Pacified South (nanping wang). The rebels took a few towns but were hampered by floods and suffered several defeats until their leader was killed three months later.

In 1004, a Nong chieftain was given a banquet at a Song prefecture. The Viets reacted to this with anger and pillaged the area.

In 1038, there was a disturbance at Rongzhou and Yizhou which took troops from three prefectures and the loss of six high-ranking officials to suppress. The prefect of Yizhou blamed the unrest on bad administration and that the problem was the result of systematic neglect of the south on the throne's part: administrators received inadequate salaries and local troops only received supplies sporadically. As a result, the temptation to raid barbarian lands was irresistible.

In 1044, Ou Xifan of the Ou clan rebelled to the northwest of Yizhou. Ou Xifan had received a jinshi degree and served as an officer but grew dissatisfied with his rewards. He declared the Great Tang and declared war on the Song. He was caught in 1045 and executed by vivisection.

==== Rise of the Nong ====
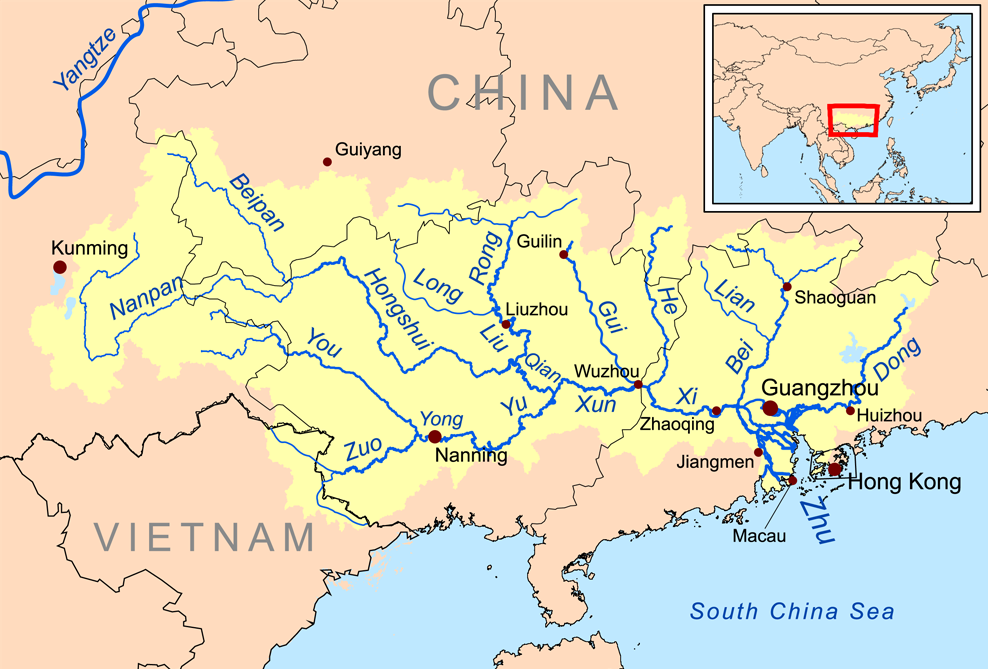
The You and Zuo rivers on the Chinese side bordering Vietnam

The major Zhuang clans were the Huang, Nong, and Wei. During the early Song period, the Huang clan was left in charge of the You and Zuo rivers. The Wei had settled on the Song-Viet border. However the power of the Nong clan increased and began to upset Huang supremacy. By the early Song, they ruled over an area known as Temo, which stretched from modern Wenshan Zhuang and Miao Autonomous Prefecture in the west to Jingxi in the east and Guangyuanzhou (Quảng Nguyên, now Cao Bằng province) in the south. Emperor Taizong of Song (r. 976–997) bestowed special favors on Nong leadership, acknowledging that they had succeeded the Huang in the Zuo River region.

The Guangyuan zhou Man-barbarian Nong clan came from the south west... of Yongzhou and held the districts there. The terrain was steep mountains and inaccessible valleys; it produced gold and cinnabar. A good many people lived there. They wore their hair long and fastened their clothes on the left. They loved to fight and struggle and regarded death lightly. Earlier the leaders were of the Wei, Huang, Zhou and Nong clans which were constantly contending and pillaging each other.... The Huang clan offered pledges and 13 Bu-districts and 29 Man-barbarian Zhou-districts were established.

— History of Song

The first member of the Nong clan to gain official recognition was Nong Minfu. It is not known when he was born, but a memorial in early 977 states that the "peaceful and generous" leader Nong Minfu of Guangyuanzhou had established himself over ten neighboring villages with the support of Southern Han (907–971). Minfu had supported Duan Siping (r. 937–944) of the Dali Kingdom and was rewarded with titles. Duan rewarded another leader in Temo with the title buxie. The Song bestowed the titles "minister of works" (sigong) and "grand master of splendid happiness bearing the golden pocket with purple trimming" (jinzi guanglu daifu) on Minfu. These titles were passed onto Minfu's son, Nong Quanfu (Zhuang: Nungz Cienzfuk, Vietnamese: Nùng Tồn Phúc). He was also granted additional authority of Dangyouzhou (modern Jingxi, Guangxi). His younger brother, Nong Quanlu, controlled Wennaizhou (modern Na Rì District). Such preferential treatment was viewed with anger in Đại Cồ Việt, which attacked a Song garrison in 1004 after it held a banquet for a Nong chieftain.

In 1005, a woman known as A Nong was born to a notable warrior chieftain who accepted titles from both the Song dynasty and the Early Lê dynasty of Đại Cồ Việt. A Nong learned to spin and weave from her mother. At some point she was separated from the other girls and learned the ways of a shaman. She married Nong Quanfu and became his primary political adviser. Her brother, Nong Dangdao, inherited Wulezhou near Guangyuanzhou. She gave birth to Nong Zhigao in 1025. A Nong induced Quanfu to kill his brother, the leader of the Cen clan, and take his lands. The Nong clan eventually controlled 14 major grottoes (dong) in comparison to only 5 for the Huang clan.

In 1035, Quanfu declared the founding of the Kingdom of Longevity (Changsheng Guo 長生國) and took for himself the exalted title "Luminous and Sage Emperor" (Zhaosheng Huangdi 昭聖皇帝) while A Nong became the "Enlightened and Virtuous Empress" (Mingde Huanghou 明德皇后). Another source says he founded the Chang Qi Guo and styled himself the first king of Dali, Tu Dan Chao. The local prefect of Tianzhou requested assistance from Yongzhou to deal with the rebellion, but officials there appear to have feared involvement and refused to offer aid. In 1039, the emperor of the Lý dynasty, Lý Thái Tông, invaded the newly found kingdom, captured Quanfu and four other male members of the Nong clan, and executed them. A Nong escaped with the 14-year old Zhigao into Song territory.

==== Nong Zhigao ====
Nong Zhigao's movement in the Song dynasty

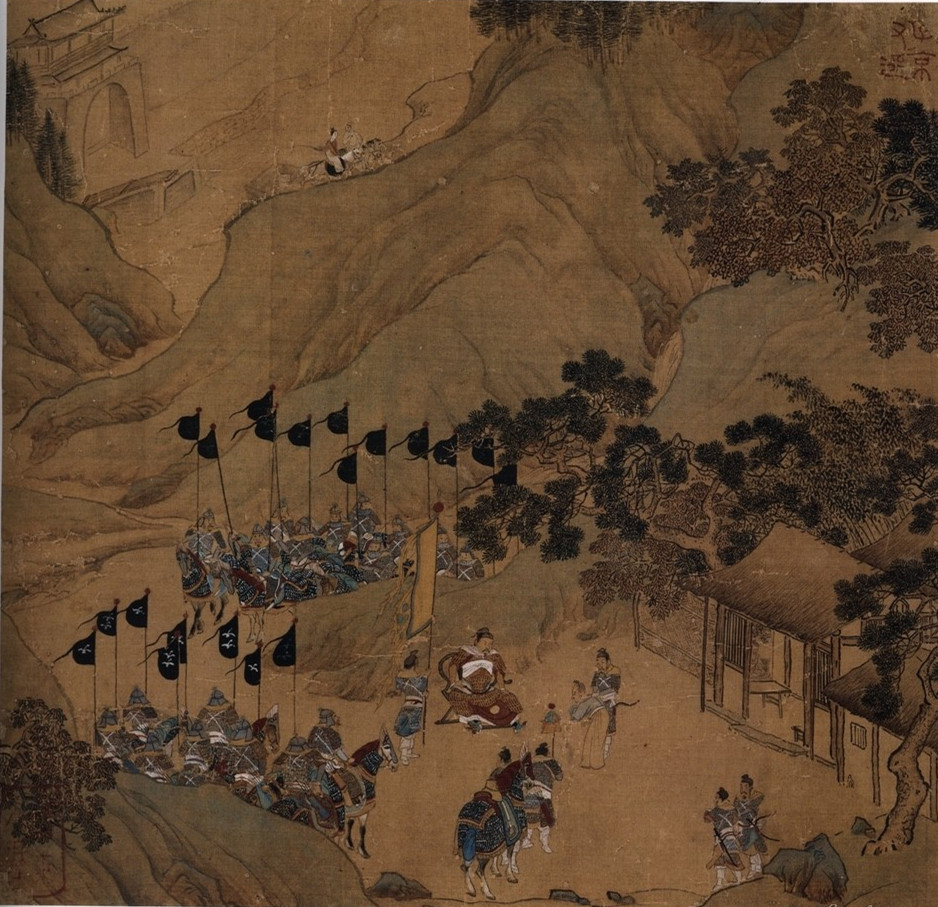
Nong Zhigao depicted in a Ming dynasty painting

In 1041, Nong Zhigao and his mother seized Dangyouzhou (modern Jingxi, Guangxi) and the Leihuo grotto settlement (modern Daxin County). A Nong married a wealthy merchant but Zhigao murdered this man. A Nong married a third time to Nong Xiaqing, expanding their territory further into Temo. In 1042, Zhigao declared the founding the Kingdom of the Great Succession (Dali Guo 大歷國, not to be confused with the Kingdom of Dali 大理). Đại Cồ Việt sent troops and captured him. He was held prisoner for a year before he was released with an honorary title and given control of Guangyuan, Leihuo, Ping'an, Pinpo, and Silang in return for a share of their natural resources, particularly gold. In 1048, Zhigao declared another state, the Kingdom of the Southern Heavens (Nantian Guo), and took a reign title, "Auspicious Circumstances" (Jingrui). He called the Viet court's actions criminal and that his territory would not be annexed by China. In the fall of 1049, Zhigao's forces pillaged Yongzhou. In 1050, Đại Cồ Việt launched an attack on Zhigao's stronghold and evicted him, sending him fleeing into Song territory.

Nong Zhigao approached the Song at Yongzhou for assistance but was denied an audience until he staged a military demonstration beneath the walls. He then presented substantial tribute (tame elephants and lumps of gold and silver) and petitioned the emperor. The prefect of Yongzhou, Chen Gong, never passed on the petition to court. However when the tribute reached the court, the Fiscal Commissioner Xiao Gu argued to the emperor that Zhigao should be granted title. The Song court refused because it considered Zhigao's service to be the right of Đại Cồ Việt. The military commander Yuan Yun was dispatched to attack Zhigao but instead he wanted to offer Zhigao protection, and returned to the capital with tribute, arguing for a change in policy.

Zhigao's followers set up shop and through the mineral wealth of his holdings formed close ties with Chinese traders, including jinshi degree holders Huang Wei and Huang Shifu. He also recruited other Nong clan members such as Nong Zhizhong and Nong Jianhou. Under the influence of Huang Wei and A Nong, Zhigao decided to declare independence. In 1052, Zhigao proclaimed the establishment of the Kingdom of the Great South (Danan Guo) and granted himself the title of Benevolent and Kind Emperor (Renhui Huangdi). In the spring of 1052, Zhigao ordered the villages under his control to be burnt and led 5,000 subjects on the path to Guangzhou.

As for all the belongings that you amassed during your lives, they were destroyed today by heaven's fire. You have nothing to live on, and you are considered poor indeed! You must grab Yongzhou and capture Guangzhou where I will establish myself as its ruler. If you don't do this, you will necessarily die."

— Nong Zhigao

By summertime, he had taken Yongzhou and reached Guangzhou, where his 50,000 strong army became bogged down in a prolonged siege. Despite cutting off Guangzhou from water, the city was well stocked with provisions, and the defenders fought back with crossbow defenses. The district magistrate Xiao Zhu foiled a waterborne attack on Guangzhou by setting fire to their ships. After 57 days, Zhigao was forced to retreat as more Song reinforcements arrived. He held out at Yongzhou, defeating five Song commanders sent against him. The Song called in a veteran of the Song–Xia wars, Di Qing, to assume command of the anti-rebel forces. He gathered 31,000 men and 32 generals, including Fanluo tribal cavalry from the northwest that "were able to ascend and descend mountains as though walking on level ground." Lý Thái Tông also offered to send 20,000 troops but the offer was refused out of fear that the troops would not leave afterwards.

One general, Chen Shu, attacked early with 8,000 men and suffered a defeat against the Zhuang forces. Di Qing executed him and 31 officers. He then marched his forces under cover of night and blocked the Kunlun Pass east of Yongzhou. Zhigao attacked the Song forces in early 1054. The Zhuang wore bright crimson uniforms and fought in units of three armed with long shields that advanced "like fire." One man carried a shield while the other two hurled metal-tipped bamboo javelins. In the initial stages of battle, one Song commander was killed, and the Song army was momentarily forced to fall back. In the second engagement, the Zhuang forces could not withstand the Song infantry charges. The Song infantry hacked at the Zhuang shields with heavy swords and axes while the Fanluo cavalry attacked their wings, breaking their ranks. The Zhuang fled, suffering 5,341 casualties. Di Qing retook Yongzhou and executed the jinshi-holder Huang, two of Zhigao's family, and 57 officials. Zhigao and his remaining family fled to seek help from the Zhuang clans, but he was not well liked, and the Huang chieftain, Huang Shouling, refused to aid him. He also requested aid from the Viet court, which sent the tribal commander Võ Nhị to assist the rebels. A Nong and her son Nong Zhiguang, as well as Zhigao's sons Nong Jifeng and Nong Jizong, were caught at Temo in Yunnan by Zhuang forces allied with the Song. They were executed. Zhigao failed to raise more troops in Dali.

According to official accounts, Nong Zhigao was executed by the ruler of Dali and his head presented to Song authorities. However popular accounts claim he fled further south into modern northern Thailand, where his descendants thrive to this day. The Zhuang of Wenshan Zhuang and Miao Autonomous Prefecture identify as survivors of Zhigao's rebel movement and other groups in Dali City, Xishuangbana, and northern Thailand claim to be descended from Zhigao. Many Zhuang songs refer to him as "King Nong."

==== Tuding ====
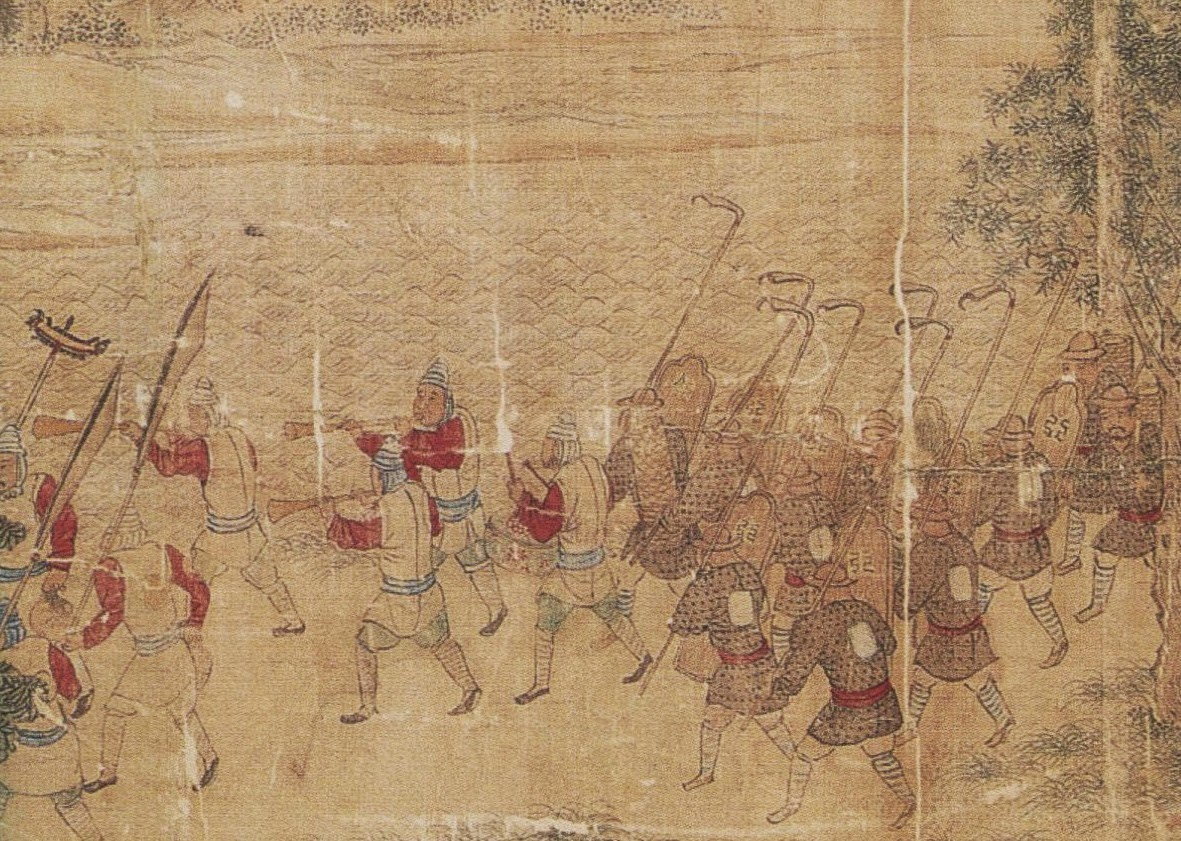
Zhuang mercenaries known as wolf warriors (lang bing) from the painting, Kang wo tu juan, Ming dynasty

The Song took full control of the Zuo and You rivers, incorporating the regions into the Song bureaucracy. When Zhigao and his fellow rebel chieftains fled, they were replaced by Song-allied clans, primarily the Huang and Cen who were given hereditary posts. Chinese schools in Zhuang areas were set up and the sons of elite Zhuang who enrolled in them later took posts in the Song bureaucracy. Chinese style dress began to influence the Zhuang, who started buttoning their clothing on the right, women wearing bodices, giving up trousers for skirts, and wearing their hair in the Chinese style. Many of the former rebels were enlisted in the Song army, which paid for more than 50,000 Zhuang troops known as Tuding (tubing or zhuangding) from 1064–1067. By 1108, more than a hundred thousand registered as soldiers from the region. The Zhuang warriors carried both a long and short double-edged sword. They were also capable of using crossbows, poisoned arrows, and elephants. A three man Zhuang unit had one man carrying a large shield while the other two hurled javelins. Although they fought for the Song, they only obeyed the orders of their Zhuang chieftains. In 1178, the vice-prefect of Guilin, Zhou Qufei, said that they "live and die at the orders of their leaders."

Although the Song court's early attention to the frontier leaders was largely symbolic, by the time of Song Shenzong (r. 1065–85), "local militia" (tuding) were being actively organized among the aboriginal villages so as to provide the first line of defense for the Chinese empire. Wang Anshi would comment in an essay on the administration of the Yong frontier command that the aboriginal communities of the Left and Right rivers should be relied upon for the security of both Guangxi and Guangdong.

— James A. Anderson

==== Militarization ====
The defeat of Nong Zhigao in Quảng Nguyên (C. Guangyuan; now Cao Bằng Province) removed the tribal buffer zone between Đại Cồ Việt and the Song dynasty. Zhigao's final defeat by the Song also had the effect of subordinating a large portion of that zone to direct Song control. The Viet court did not intervene in the matter and for 20 years after the Nong Zhigao rebellions, there was general peace along the border. However the regional power balance had been lost. Han Chinese military settlers moved in and new leaders took over the surviving communities. Several influential Nong leaders sided with the Viet court. Crucial influences for the lead up to war include the Song-court sponsored New Policies promoted by Wang Anshi and efforts by the Lý court to consolidate peripheral fiefdoms.

The Song and Đại Cồ Việt treated their frontier borderland peoples in different ways. The Chinese tried to introduce "uncultured" barbarians to the benefits of the "civilized" center in the post-Nong Zhigao period. Viet leadership on the other hand created "patron-client" relationships using marriage alliances and military expeditions to maintain "satellite" partners. Successive Viet courts saw the extraction of resources from frontier vassals as a measurement of their efficacy. However by the 11th century, both the Chinese and Viet courts saw the frontier as a source of available troops famed for their ferocity. By 1065, around 44,500 militia had been recruited from these communities by the Song.

Frontier unrest began anew in 1057 when Nong Zongdan (V. Nùng Tông Ðán), a kinsman of Nong Zhigao, entered Song territory. The frontier administrator Wang Han visited Zongdan's camp at Leihuo to discourage him from seeking inclusion in the Song dynasty since it would upset the Viet court. Instead he proposed that he stay outside Song territory as a loyal frontier militia leader. Wang feared that a resurgence of the Nong clan would spell trouble for the frontier. The Song court ignored his apprehensions and offered the Nong and other communities "Interior Dependency" status. By 1061, Emperor Renzong of Song (r. 1022–63) was regretting his decision and lamented that the "Nong Bandit" and his kin had strayed far from their frontier duties and might never be incorporated into the Song administration. However in 1062 when Zongdan requested his territory be incorporated into the Song empire, Renzong accepted his request. According to The Draft Documents Pertaining to Song Official Matters, Zongdan was regarded by the Song as the prefect of Leihuo prefecture, renamed "Pacified Prefecture" (Shun'anzhou), and possessed the title "Personal Guardian General of the Right." Nong Zhihui (V. Nùng Trí Hội), the brother of Nong Zhigao, received the title "Personal Guardian of the Left." Other members of the Nong clan in Temo such as Nong Bing, Nong Guang, and Nong Xiaqing swore loyalty to the Song. Zhigao's former generals Lu Bao (V. Lư Báo), Li Mao (V. Lê Mạo), and Huang Zhongqing (V. Hoàng Trọng Khanh) were also granted official titles.

In the view of the Song court, these titles were not merely honorary appointments. Local militia in the southwestern frontier zone were reorganized in 1065 under Guizhou prefect Lu Shen. The 45 grottoes along the You and Zuo rivers were assigned grotto militia leaders. A commissioner surveyed the region for able-bodied men to be organized under a guard commander selected from the area's prominent households, who received a specific signal banner to indicate their group's distinction. Groups of 30 men were organized into local governance units known as "tithings (jia)", which were organized in groups of five under a troop commandant (dutou), groups of ten led by an aboriginal commander (zhijunshi), and in groups of 50 led by a commander-in-chief (duzhijunshi). It was perhaps this intensification of border defense that the Viet court felt threatened by, as it saw its own systems of local control eroded.

Scholars also note that there was a sharp increase in the population of the Song dynasty's southwest frontier by the end of the 11th century. At the end of the 10th c., this region counted only 17,760 households while the same area had increased to 56,596 households in 1078–85. Guangnan West Circuit's population in 1080 stood at 287,723 households, a 133% increase from the Tang census of 742. Some of the increase can be attributed to including indigenous populations and improved recording methods, but the trend of increased Han Chinese settlement is clear. With the increase of Han Chinese population also came more northern-oriented cultural practices.

Before the Tang, this county was settled by the Miao barbarian people. There were no traces of Han settlers. In 1053, The 'Great Martial Leader' Di (Qing) put down the rebellion of the Quang Nguyên barbarian Nùng Trí Cao, the troops following the general's expedition remained in the region to open up and settle the wasteland. Their settlements extended throughout this county.

— A Record of Fengshan County

The Lý court was also in the process of consolidating its frontier. In 1059, efforts were made to take direct control of the frontier and its manpower. The northern frontier in the Zuo-You river region was divided into new administrative units: Ngự Long, Vũ Thắng, Long Dực, Thần Ðiện, Bổng Thánh, Bảo Thắng, Hùng Lược, and Vạn Tiệp. Each of these units was assigned an official. Militia units were established among local communities conscripts had the character "Army of the Son of Heaven" (tianzi jun) tattooed on their foreheads. This reflected a distinctly Southeast Asian way of controlling regional manpower.

==== Sino-Viet conflicts ====
In the early 1060s, border conflicts began to occur along the Song-Viet frontier. In the spring of 1060, the chieftain of Lạng Châu and imperial in-law, Thân Thiệu Thái, crossed into Song territory to raid for cattle. Thiệu Thái captured the Song commander Yang Baocai in the attack. In autumn of 1060, Song forces also crossed the border but were unsuccessful in recovering Yang. Fighting caused by the natives led by Thiệu Tháị claimed the lives of five military inspectors. The military commissioner Yu Jing sought aid from Champa for a joint attack on Quảng Nguyên. The Lý court caught wind of this and began directly courting local leaders.

Despite increased military tensions, the Lý court sought to defuse the situation by sending a delegation led by Bi Gia Dụ to Yongzhou. The Song authorities requested the return of Yang Baocai but was denied. Emperor Renzong was also wary of further increasing tensions and instructed the local military commissions to refrain from assembling troops. On 8 February 1063, two tributary envoys from the Lý court presented to the Song emperor nine tame elephants. On 7 April 1063, the new Song emperor Yingzong (r. 1063–67) sent calligraphic compositions by Renzong as gifts to the Lý court. On the same day the Viet envoy Lý Kế Tiên prepared to depart Kaifeng, news arrived that Thàn Thiệu Tháị had attacked settlements in Guangnan West Circuit. A Guangnan official requested immediate retaliation against the southern intruders. However the Song court tried to distance Thiệu Thái's actions from the Lý court. An envoy from Thăng Long arrived seeking forgiveness for the attack. Yingzong decided not to retaliate.

On 18 November 1064, the Guizhou prefect Lu Shen reported that a military delegation from Thăng Long had crossed the border seeking Nong Rixin (V. Nùng Nhật Tân), the son of Nong Zongdan. He also reported that the delegation showed interest in encroaching on Song territory, including Wenmen grotto (Hurun, a village in Jingxi, Guangxi). The Song court took no particular action but Lu was determined to expand Song military presence in the south. Lu raised 44,500 troops from 45 aboriginal leaders along the Zuo-You River region and ordered them to repair and fortify military defenses. To gain local trust, he requested special seals be made for his militia leaders and that the Zuo-You region be exempt from taxes. The Viet officials became concerned about this development and sent a tribute envoy to Kaifeng to remind the Song court of the Viet role in settling frontier matters. Meanwhile Lu proposed a special training and indoctrination program for a local chieftain each year that would see them enter the official bureaucracy after three years.

In late 1065, Zongdan switched allegiance from the Song and proposed an alliance with Lý Thánh Tông (r. 1054–72) and Quảng Nguyên chieftain Liu Ji (V. Lưu Ký). Lu Shen reported this to court, but Yingzong did not take any action other than to reassign Zongdan's titles. To offset Zongdan's defection, the Song bestowed titles on Nong Zhihui and acknowledged him as the sole leader of Quảng Nguyên.

Song officials on the southern frontier were training for military action. By late 1067, the Guizhou prefect Zhang Tian reported that Liu Ji was in communication with Lu Bao, who had crossed into Song territory to seek personal glory. Zhang wished to attack Lu Bao but the Song court rejected this course of action. However by 1069, Lu Bao had offered his allegiance to the Song while Liu Ji remained in Quảng Nguyên and was nominally under the control of Thăng Long. In late 1071, the Guangnan military commissioner Xiao Gu reported that Liu Ji had been spotted near Shun'anzhou (in Quảng Nguyên) at the head of more than 200 men. The Song court expressed concerns that forces were being amassed by barbarians.

In 1072, a decree ordered administrators of Zhuang regions to avoid trying to "acquire merit" by military actions, to keep Han Chinese (particularly criminals fleeing the law) out of the region, and to investigate problems which might lead to disorder.

On 2 February 1072, Lý Thánh Tông died. The new ruler, Lý Nhân Tông (r. 1072–1128), was only six years old. His regents, such as the defender-in-chief Lý Thường Kiệt, consolidated power by announcing a general amnesty for all outlaws in the protected prefectures. It was reported that the local chieftain of Lạng Châu, Dương Cảnh Thông, brought to court a white dear as tribute and was rewarded with the title "Grand Guardian."

In 1073, a group from the "Five Clans" sent a large tribute embassy numbering 890 to the Song court.

==== Song–Đại Việt war ====
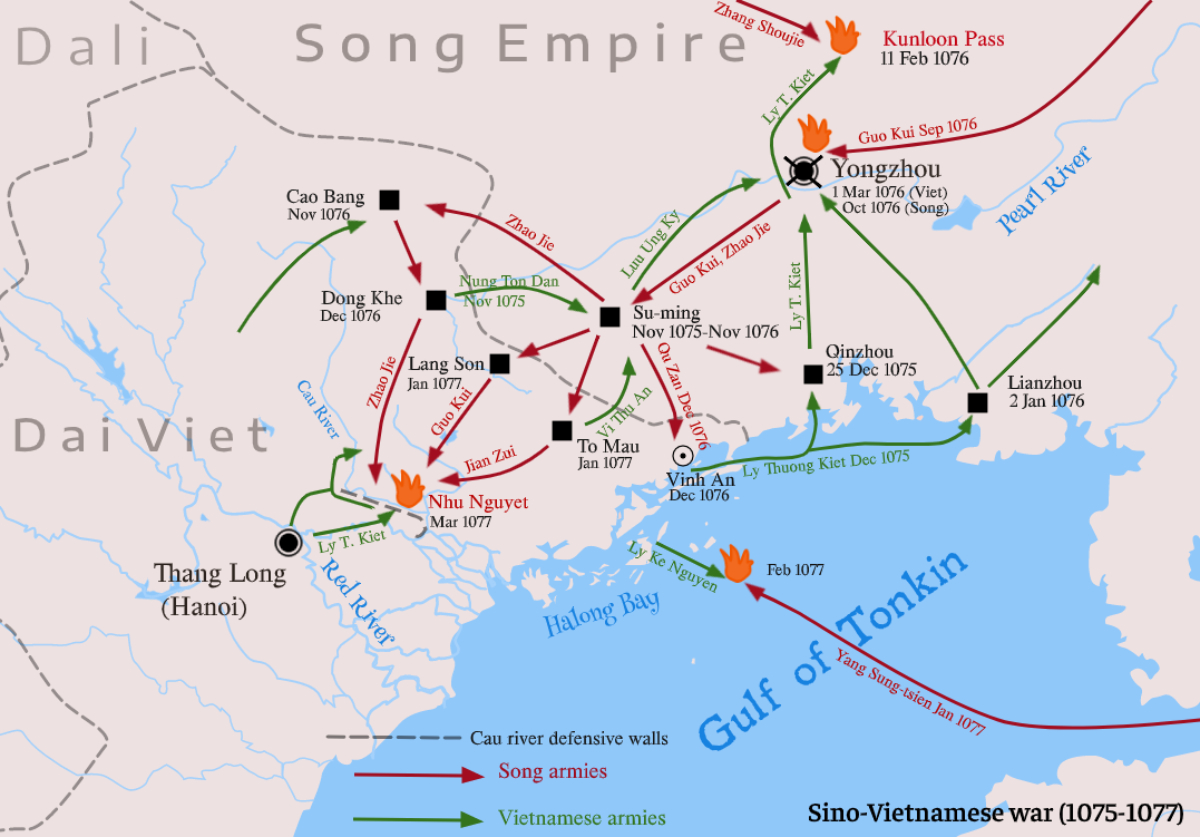
Song–Đại Việt war (1075–1077)

In the late 1060s, Wang Anshi's New Policies combined with the sentiment of irredentism in Shenzong's court to call on greater militarization and expansion of Song territory. Wang wanted to overhaul the tribute system for barbarians in the south. Lý Thường Kiệt viewed the changing economic relationship between the Song and its frontier people as an abandonment of the traditional tribute paradigm. Wang called for military action from Song imperial troops.

In early 1075, Thăng Long requested the return of an upland chieftain who had gone over to the Song with 700 followers. The Song refused. In the same year, Shenzong sent two officials, Shen Qi and Liu Yi, to govern Guizhou. They were instructed to train the locals in riverine warfare and forbid them from trading with subjects of the Viet court. Lý Thường Kiệt accused the Song of training soldiers for attacking Thăng Long. At the same time, the Quảng Nguyên (C. Guangyuan) chieftain Liu Ji launched an attack on Yongzhou and was repulsed by Nong Zhihui, the chieftain of Guihua.

Lý Thường Kiệt led an invasion of the Song dynasty with support from Zhuang leaders such as Nong Zongdan, who led a contingent of uplanders towards Yongzhou. In October 1075, Zongdan led 23,000 soldiers along the Zuo River into Song territory and captured Guwan, Taiping, Yongping, and Qianlong garrisons. The forces of Zongdan and Lý Thường Kiệt retreated after the arrival of Song reinforcements. A Song counterattack saw the capture of Quảng Nguyên and Liu Ji before being stopped at Nhu Nguyệt River (in modern Bắc Ninh Province). Liu Ji deployed elephant troops against the Song army but they were defeated using scythes that cut their trunks. Several Zhuang grotto settlements in Quảng Nguyên were razed.

Song forces lost about 50%–60% of their force before retreating, half of them dying to diseases. As a result of mounting casualties on both sides, Lý Thường Kiệt made peace overtures to the Song in 1077; the Song commander Guo Kui agreed to withdraw his troops but kept five disputed regions of Quảng Nguyên (renamed Shun'anzhou or Thuận Châu), Tư Lang Châu, Môn Châu, Tô Mậu Châu, and Quảng Lăng. These areas now comprise most of modern Vietnam's Cao Bằng Province and Lạng Sơn Province. Đại Việt held control of the Yongzhou, Qinzhou and Lianzhou. In 1079 the Song arrested and executed the Nong leader Nong Zhichun (V. Nùng Trí Xuân) while taking his family as hostages. In 1083, Viets attacked Guihua under the pretense of pursuing Nong Zhihui, the brother of Nong Zhigao. Zhihui plead to the military commissioner Xiong Ben for fresh troops to ward of Viet advances, but was taken in for questioning instead.

In 1082, after a long period of mutual isolation, King Lý Nhân Tông of Đại Việt returned Yongzhou, Qinzhou, and Lianzhou back to Song authorities, along with prisoners of war, and in return Song relinquished its control of four prefectures and a county, including the Nong clan's home of Quảng Nguyên, Bảo Lạc, and Susang. Further negotiations took place from July 6 to August 8, 1084 at Yongping garrison in southern Guangnan, where Đại Việt's Director of Military Personnel Lê Văn Thịnh (fl. 1038–1096) convinced Song to fix the two countries' borders between Quảng Nguyên and Guihua prefectures.

=== Ming-Qing ===
The Zhuang continued to cause trouble in the Ming dynasty, which used different groups against one another. One of the bloodiest battles in Zhuang history was that at Big Rattan Gorge against the Yao in 1465, where 20,000 deaths were reported. Parts of Guangxi were ruled by the powerful Cen clan (岑). The Cen were of Zhuang ethnicity and were recognized as tusi or local ruler by the Ming and Qing. The Ming launched several campaigns to civilize the non-Han southwestern people, including the Zhuang, by setting up schools. While the Zhuang became more intimately familiar with Han culture, it did not pacify them, and they continued to cause rebellions into the Qing dynasty. Even though schools were introduced to Zhuang areas, the Zhuang chiefly lineages monopolized access to education, limiting the commoners' ability to take official examinations, thereby securing their social status and political power. The Zhuang served as mercenary troops known as wolf warriors in the Ming army.

Writing in the 19th century, a Qing dynasty official described the Zhuang thus:

The Yao and Zhuang live mixed up together. They do not devote themselves to Poetry or to Documents ... They have a crude understanding of rites and decorum. The local customs are to pay great regard for wealth, and to kill lightly. When they leave the house they carry knives for self-defense. The inhabitants labor in the rice-fields; they do not engage in trade ... In the markets it is mainly the women who engage in trade. When sick they resort only to shamans and spirit mediums.

=== Nationalism ===
Zhuang/Nung, Tay, and Bouyei distribution

Many Zhuang peasants took part in revolutionary movements such as the 1911 Revolution as part of the Tongmenghui. In the 1930s, the Kuomintang attempted to control the Zhuang people through force, causing indignation and resentment. In contrast, many Zhuang joined the communist army under the leadership of their Zhuang leader, Wei Baqun. By the 1950s, Zhuang society in Guangxi was largely organized by lineages of zhixi (branches) such as the Nong, Sha, and Tu. In September 1952, the People's Republic of China recognized the Zhuang as a national minority and established the Guangxi Zhuang Autonomous Region. Zhuang ethnic consciousness arguably developed in the period afterwards as the region became more connected with other parts of China, especially the urban areas. Public events such as the springtime festival and song festival Sanyuesan (Sam Nyied Sam) were promoted by the government, but by the 1980s they had become more tourist attractions than a symbol of ethnic solidarity for the Zhuang. Zhuang scholars who wanted to promote Zhuang culture and writing mainly lived in the urban areas of Guangxi and Beijing while residents in rural areas were more concerned with poverty and jobs.

==== Worship of Nong Zhigao ====
Nong Zhigao (V. Nùng Trí Cao) is revered by Tai-speaking communities in Guangxi and Cao Bằng. Many families with the Nong (V. Nùng) surname claim descent from Nong Zhigao and sponsor public displays of pride in the 11th century leader through temples and monuments. There is more evidence of the celebration of Nong Zhigao in Cao Bằng than in Guangxi, especially prior to the modern era, after which the local leader was inserted into nationalist histories as though he were a citizen of China or Vietnam.

Historically the Song general Di Qing, who defeated the rebellion, was the one who was honored. In 1053, a large stele was erected by himself in Guilin to eulogize his deeds. The "suppressing the Man barbarian" (pingman) stele described Nong Zhigao as a barbarian bandit who committed crimes against Chinese officials. Local communities also constructed temples to commemorate those officials who died in the rebellion. There is little to no physical evidence of Nong Zhigao's commemoration in premodern China. However by the 18th century, certain communities in Guangxi did worship him. In 1956, a stele dating to 1706 was discovered in Tiandeng County. It commemorated the construction of the Zhongxiu Dujun Village Temple and describes how Nong Dalingshen Dianxia (His Highness Nùng the Great Spirit) became a lord, fought valiantly, and transformed into a spirit to protect the region. The primary patrons of the temple were the Huang, Lin and Zhao clans. After the defeat of Nong Zhigao, the Nong clan was forced to take the surname Zhao.

In the late 1970s, Nong Zhigao was rehabilitated as part of the government's liberalization policies for national minorities. In the early 1980s, Huang Xianfan's Nong Zhigao portrayed him as a Chinese leader at the center of a rich local history. After the Sino-Vietnamese War in 1979, Huang interpreted Nong Zhigao as local leader who fought against a corrupt Song court that refused to provide locals with protection from marauding bands from Đại Việt. The orthodox Dangdai Zhongguode Guangxi portrays Nong Zhigao as a Zhuang who rose up to protect Chinese borders from Vietnamese aggression. By the late 1980s, collections of folklore containing tales of Nong Zhigao's heroism had been published. On 8 January 1997, a group of Nong Zhigao's descendants in Jingxi erected a stele in honor of his birth. The site of the monument is supposedly where Nong Zhigao held his training grounds during his uprising. The Zhuang of Wenshan Zhuang and Miao Autonomous Prefecture identify as survivors of Nong Zhigao's rebel movement and other groups in Dali City, Xishuangbana, and northern Thailand claim to be descended from Nong Zhigao. Many Zhuang songs refer to him as "King Nong."

== Customs and culture ==
=== Gender ===
Originally Zhuang society was more egalitarian and female shamans such as A Nong were respected. Families traced their lineage through both male and female members. Men engaged in child rearing and often moved into their wives' families rather than establish their own. Men believed that their wives regularly dosed them with an elixir called the Wugu that would kill them if they were unfaithful. Courting was carried out in a song festival where intended marriage partners responded to each other in rhyme and meter.

At some point Zhuang customs became more patrilineal as they absorbed more Han customs. Families began tracing their lineage only through men. Marriage was decided through horoscopes to match older men and younger women. The wife moved in with the husband upon marriage. Children's names were decided by their maternal uncles, who had the role of ritual support during marriage ceremonies and their parents' funerals. There was also a preference for boys to marry their maternal cousins.

=== Languages ===
While Chinese scholarship continues to place the Zhuang–Dong languages among the Sino-Tibetan family, other linguists treat the Tai languages as a separate family. They have been linked with the Austronesian languages, which dispersed from Taiwan after a migration from the mainland. However, the Austro-Tai hypothesis uniting these families is now supported by only a few scholars.

The Zhuang languages are a group of mutually unintelligible languages of the Tai family, heavily influenced by nearby Sinitic languages such as Cantonese. The Standard Zhuang language is based on a northern dialect, but it is closer to the Bouyei language than Southern Zhuang, so few people learn it. Due to mutually unintelligible languages or dialects, Zhuang people from different areas use Chinese to communicate with each other and Chinese was used as the lingua franca in areas of high Zhuang population such as the official Guangxi Zhuang Autonomous Region.

Whilst according to some semi-official sources "In Guangxi, compulsory education is bilingual in Zhuang and Chinese, with a focus on early Zhuang literacy," only a small percentage of schools teach written Zhuang. Zhuang has been written using logograms based on Chinese characters ("Sawndip") for over 1,000 years. Standard Zhuang, the official alphabetical script, was introduced in 1957 and in 1982 the Cyrillic letters were changed to Latin letters. However, the traditional character-based script is more commonly used in less formal domains and in June 2017 just over one thousand of these characters were added in Unicode 10.0.

The Zhuang have their own scriptures written in poetic form such as the Baeu Rodo.

==== Sawndip literature ====
The literate Zhuang had their own writing system, Sawndip (lit. 'uncooked script'), recording folk songs, operas, poems, scriptures, letters, contracts and court documents. The works include both entirely indigenous works and translations from Chinese, fact and fiction, religious texts and secular texts.

==== Names ====
While most Zhuang people have adopted standard Han Chinese names, some have distinct surnames only found amongst those of Zhuang descent such as "韦" (pinyin: Wéi) and "覃" (pinyin: Tán, but usually pronounced Qín).

Regarding place names, some village names in China have the prefix "板" (pinyin: bǎn), which means "village" in Zhuang (e.g. 板塘, 板岭乡, 板帽, 板罕).

=== Festivals ===
The Buluotuo Festival is a three-day event that occurs in April during which singing and chanting take place. It sometimes parallels with another big festival across Guangxi, namely Sanyuesan.

=== Genealogical fabrications and ethnic identity ===
Many Zhuang people falsely claimed their paternal ancestors were Han Chinese from Huguang (Hubei and Hunan), Jiangnan who had migrated to Guangxi and Bouyei people in Guizhou also claimed Han Chinese Jiangnan paternal ancestry from Jiangsu. Bouyei people (Zhongjia) in Guizhou and Zhuang in Guangxi tried to claim false Han paternal ancestors in order to pass as Han people, with the Bouyei making genealogies with Han ancestors and claimed their ancestors came from Jiangnan, Hubei and Hunan (Huguang) and Shandong. The Zhuang also did this up to the 1950s and claimed their ancestors were northern Han Chinese and made fake genealogies to show it to escape marginalization and discrimination. The Communists made the Zhuang self-identify as Zhuang and stop pretending to be Han. Many ethnic minority Zhuang families in southwest China including that of Tusi chieftains fabricated genealogies claiming their paternal ancestors were northern Han Chinese. Zhuang claimed fake Han ancestry in the Anping chiefdom. Zhuang adopted Han Chinese style ancestral halls, Han ideas like fang in their lineage rules and fake Han ancestors in their genealogies.

==== Cen chiefly family ====
The surname Cen is found among the Zhuang Tusi chiefly family who ruled Tusi in Guangxi during the Yuan, Ming and Qing dynasties and they claim patrilineal Han ancestry from Song dynasty general Cen Zhongshu of Zhejiang.

== Religion ==
Most Zhuang follow a traditional animist faith known as Moism or Shigongism, which include elements of veneration of forebears. The Mo have their own sutra and professional priests known as bumo or mogong (bouxmo) who traditionally use chicken bones for divination. They may have descended from specialized priestly lineages directly attached to the Zhuang leadership. After the imposition of Chinese rule, the Zhuang priesthood lost their connection to the chieftaincy and gradually assumed the role of a ritual specialist in the villages. The bumo read scriptures, perform divination, and other rituals to drive away pestilence. Their sacred scroll is the Sanqing (three pure ones). In Chinese the bumo are known as wushi, spiritual mediums. The wupo, in contrast to the bumo, are elderly women considered to be chosen by god, who sing traditional mountain songs. The role of the wupo is Zhuang religion has been minimized due to influence from Chinese religious traditions.

=== Deities ===
The Zhuang religion believes that the world is composed of three aspects: heaven, earth, and water. Earth is ruled by the creator god, Baeuqloxdoh (Buluotuo), water by the dragon god, Ngweg (E), and heaven by the thunder god, Gyaj (Jia). Baeuqloxdoh's wife, Meh Nangz (Muniang, the mother goddess, is also worshiped.

Buluotuo and Muliujia were sent down to the empty Earth to create a new world. They departed from Heaven in the second lunar month. Buluotuo shouldered two large baskets, with one carrying five children and the other carrying bedding and clothing. Muliujia carried a hoe and sickle. They came to the area of present-day Tianyang on the 19th day. On that day there was strong wind and rain accompanied by deafening thunder and exploding lightning which caused Buluotuo's shouldered pole to break and the baskets to fall to the Earth. The bedding landed to the east of today's Na-Guan village and formed a mountain, a hole in the bedding became the caves. The fallen sickle and hoe dug a large curved slit, rain fell into the ditch and all converged to form Youjiang (the Right River). Buluotuo and Muliujia then landed on the top of the mountain to look for their children, this rock was hence called Wangzi (Waiting-for-the-son) Rock. To the west, their five children became five hills; people called it "Five Children Mountain" but it later deviated to become "Five Fingers Mountain" because of the homophonic "zi"(child) and "zhi" (fingers). Later on, Buluotuo and Muliujia lived in the muniang cave and reproduced humankind and animals. The cave faces south and there is a wide plain area in front of the cave. The cave touches a good fengshui and is surrounded by trees and flowers. Inside the cave, there is a spacious area decorated by stalactites. There are holes behind the wall of the cave in which one hole is called "sky hole" that can connect to the north. Buluotuo gradually created a wide new world. When the children grew up, Buluotuo taught them to farm and set up villages outside the mountain.

Mountains are worshiped in Zhuang culture. Between winter and spring, the Zhuang make a trip to the mountains to sing in the Zhuang style, called "hun gamj gok fwen".

Meh Nangz is the local Zhuang dialect for calling the goddess of the villagers living near Mt. Ganzhuang. It is transliterated into Mandarin as Muniang, which mean Mother Goddess. For the scholars who research Zhuang folklore, Muniang properly refers to Muliujia, or Mehloeggyap in Zhuang, which is the goddess of creation and fertility. According to the epic, the original form of the universe was swirling air. As it swirled faster and faster the universe consolidated into an "egg" and it exploded into three parts. The top part was heaven, the bottom was water, and the one in the middle was earth. Later, there was a fleshy flower that grew out of the earth and in the blooming flower was born a goddess. She was pretty and wise, with long flowing hair, and she was naked. She was known as Muliujia, "mu" refers to mother and "liujia" is a bird that the Zhuang use to symbolize wisdom. Thus, Muliujia refers to the mother of wisdom.

=== Other religions ===
There are also a number of Buddhists, Taoists, Muslims, and Christians among the Zhuang.

=== Zhuang religious terminology ===
- Daoist priests – (Ch. daogong 道公, Zh. bou dao)
- Vernacular ritual practitioners - (Ch. mogong 麽公, Zh. bou mo and Ch. shigong 師公, Zh. bou slay)
- Shamans - (Ch. wu 巫, Zh. moed and gyaem)

== Genetics ==
Genetic evidence points out Zhuang possesses a very high frequency of haplogroup O2 with most of them being subclade O2a making it the most dominant marker, one that they share with Austroasiatic. The other portion of O2 belongs to subclade O2a1. Zhuangs have prevalent frequencies of O1 which links them with Austronesian, but O1 is at much lower rate compared to O2a and only slightly higher than O2a1. Haplogroup O2 in Taiwan aborigines is almost completely non-existent, but they exhibit very high frequencies of O1. This suggests that in the event that the Austro-Tai hypothesis is correct, Kra–Dai speakers would have assimilated mostly Austroasiatic people into their population after the separation of Tai and Austronesian.

A 2022 study states that Zhuang show strong genetic affinities with Kra–Dai-speaking groups such as the Bouyei, Miao, and Yao, as well as Hainan Han. The modern Zhuang gene pool can also be "defined by the common ancestry with Hainan Han, the introgression from southern Chinese groups such as Han, Bouyei, Li, Miao, and Yao, and the long-term phylogenetic relationships with Southeast Asians".

According to a 2026 study, the Zhuang can be modeled as a mixture of Southern East Asian-related and Northern East Asian-related ancestries. They received their Northern East Asian-related ancestry from two admixture episodes, one occurring at 4,700 years ago and another occurring at 1,800 years ago. The former coincides with the expansion of Yangshao and Longshan cultures whilst the latter coincides with the unification campaigns of the Qin and Han empires.

== Distribution ==
The Census of 2020 recorded 19,568,546 Zhuang in China.

Provincial Distribution of the Zhuang, from the 2020 census

Province	Zhuang Population	% of China's Zhuang Population
Guangxi	15,721,956	80.34%
Guangdong	2,017,275	10.31%
Yunnan	1,209,837	6.18%
Zhejiang	122,792	0.63%
Guizhou	67,845	0.35%
Hainan	61,000	0.31%
Fujian	53,350	0.27%
Hunan	45,495	0.23%
Other	268,996	1.37%

=== By county ===
(Only includes counties or county-equivalents containing >0.1% of China's Zhuang population.)

Province	Prefecture	County	Zhuang Population	% of China's Zhuang Population
Guangxi Zhuang Autonomous Region	Nanning City	Yongning District (邕宁区)	766,441	4.74%
Guangxi Zhuang Autonomous Region	Laibin City	Xingbin District (兴宾区)	600,360	3.71%
Guangxi Zhuang Autonomous Region	Nanning City	Wuming County (武鸣县)	524,912	3.24%
Guangxi Zhuang Autonomous Region	Baise City	Jingxi County (靖西县)	452,399	2.8%
Guangxi Zhuang Autonomous Region	Guigang City	Gangbei District (港北区)	424,343	2.62%
Guangxi Zhuang Autonomous Region	Hechi City	Yizhou District (宜州市)	405,372	2.51%
Guangxi Zhuang Autonomous Region	Hechi City	Du'an Yao Autonomous County (都安瑶族自治县)	399,142	2.47%
Guangxi Zhuang Autonomous Region	Liuzhou City	Liujiang District (柳江区)	383,478	2.37%
Guangxi Zhuang Autonomous Region	Baise City	Pingguo City (平果市)	350,122	2.16%
Guangxi Zhuang Autonomous Region	Nanning City	Heng County (横县)	323,428	2.0%
Yunnan Province	Wenshan Zhuang and Miao Autonomous Prefecture	Guangnan County (广南县)	315,755	1.95%
Guangxi Zhuang Autonomous Region	Laibin City	Xincheng County (忻城县)	315,354	1.95%
Guangxi Zhuang Autonomous Region	Chongzuo City	Tiandeng County (天等县)	307,660	1.9%
Guangxi Zhuang Autonomous Region	Chongzuo City	Daxin County (大新县)	306,617	1.9%
Guangxi Zhuang Autonomous Region	Chongzuo City	Fusui County (扶绥县)	305,369	1.89%
Guangxi Zhuang Autonomous Region	Nanning City	Mashan County (马山县)	302,035	1.87%
Guangxi Zhuang Autonomous Region	Nanning City	Long'an County (隆安县)	301,972	1.87%
Guangxi Zhuang Autonomous Region	Baise City	Tiandong County (田东县)	301,895	1.87%
Guangxi Zhuang Autonomous Region	Nanning City	Shanglin County (上林县)	297,939	1.84%
Guangxi Zhuang Autonomous Region	Chongzuo City	Ningming County (宁明县)	270,754	1.67%
Guangxi Zhuang Autonomous Region	Baise City	Debao County (德保县)	268,650	1.66%
Guangxi Zhuang Autonomous Region	Hechi City	Dahua Yao Autonomous County (大化瑶族自治县)	261,277	1.61%
Guangxi Zhuang Autonomous Region	Baise City	Tianyang County (田阳县)	261,129	1.61%
Guangxi Zhuang Autonomous Region	Chongzuo City	Jiangzhou District (江州区)	245,714	1.52%
Guangxi Zhuang Autonomous Region	Baise City	Youjiang District (右江区)	244,329	1.51%
Guangxi Zhuang Autonomous Region	Chongzuo City	Longzhou County (龙州县)	242,616	1.5%
Guangxi Zhuang Autonomous Region	Nanning City	Shijiao District (市郊区)	242,049	1.5%
Guangxi Zhuang Autonomous Region	Laibin City	Wuxuan County (武宣县)	237,239	1.47%
Guangxi Zhuang Autonomous Region	Hechi City	Huanjiang Maonan Autonomous County (环江毛南族自治县)	231,373	1.43%
Guangxi Zhuang Autonomous Region	Hechi City	Jinchengjiang District (金城江区)	219,381	1.36%
Guangxi Zhuang Autonomous Region	Hechi City	Donglan County (东兰县)	212,998	1.32%
Guangxi Zhuang Autonomous Region	Laibin City	Xiangzhou County (象州县)	212,849	1.32%
Yunnan Province	Wenshan Zhuang and Miao Autonomous Prefecture	Funing County (富宁县)	211,749	1.31%
Guangxi Zhuang Autonomous Region	Qinzhou City	Qinbei District (钦北区)	209,460	1.29%
Guangxi Zhuang Autonomous Region	Liuzhou City	Luzhai County (鹿寨县)	208,262	1.29%
Guangxi Zhuang Autonomous Region	Liuzhou City	Liucheng County (柳城县)	186,720	1.15%
Guangxi Zhuang Autonomous Region	Baise City	Longlin Various Nationalities Autonomous County (隆林各族自治县)	180,172	1.11%
Guangxi Zhuang Autonomous Region	Fangchenggang City	Shangsi County (上思县)	179,837	1.11%
Guangxi Zhuang Autonomous Region	Hechi City	Nandan County (南丹县)	162,944	1.01%
Guangxi Zhuang Autonomous Region	Nanning City	Binyang County (宾阳县)	160,893	0.99%
Guangxi Zhuang Autonomous Region	Nanning City	Xixiangtang District (西乡塘区)	152,606	0.94%
Guangxi Zhuang Autonomous Region	Baise City	Napo County (那坡县)	151,939	0.94%
Guangxi Zhuang Autonomous Region	Hechi City	Bama Yao Autonomous County (巴马瑶族自治县)	151,923	0.94%
Guangxi Zhuang Autonomous Region	Baise City	Tianlin County (田林县)	140,507	0.87%
Yunnan Province	Wenshan Zhuang and Miao Autonomous Prefecture	Yanshan County (砚山县)	130,146	0.8%
Guangxi Zhuang Autonomous Region	Hechi City	Luocheng Mulao Autonomous County (罗城仫佬族自治县)	122,803	0.76%
Yunnan Province	Wenshan Zhuang and Miao Autonomous Prefecture	Qiubei County (丘北县)	120,626	0.75%
Guangxi Zhuang Autonomous Region	Nanning City	Qingxiu District (青秀区)	112,402	0.69%
Guangdong Province	Dongguan City	Urban area (市辖区)	98,164	0.61%
Guangxi Zhuang Autonomous Region	Liuzhou City	Rong'an County (融安县)	97,898	0.6%
Guangxi Zhuang Autonomous Region	Hechi City	Fengshan County (凤山县)	93,652	0.58%
Guangxi Zhuang Autonomous Region	Laibin City	Heshan City (合山市)	93,456	0.58%
Guangxi Zhuang Autonomous Region	Guigang City	Guiping City (桂平市)	93,271	0.58%
Yunnan Province	Wenshan Zhuang and Miao Autonomous Prefecture	Wenshan City (文山市)	91,257	0.56%
Guangxi Zhuang Autonomous Region	Liuzhou City	Shijiao District (市郊区)	90,263	0.56%
Guangxi Zhuang Autonomous Region	Baise City	Xilin County (西林县)	88,935	0.55%
Guangxi Zhuang Autonomous Region	Chongzuo City	Pingxiang City (凭祥市)	85,603	0.53%
Guangxi Zhuang Autonomous Region	Fangchenggang City	Fangcheng District (防城区)	84,281	0.52%
Guangdong Province	Shenzhen City	Bao'an District (宝安区)	81,368	0.5%
Guangxi Zhuang Autonomous Region	Hechi City	Tian'e County (天峨县)	79,236	0.49%
Guangxi Zhuang Autonomous Region	Baise City	Leye County (乐业县)	71,739	0.44%
Guangxi Zhuang Autonomous Region	Liuzhou City	Liunan District (柳南区)	63,470	0.39%
Guangxi Zhuang Autonomous Region	Liuzhou City	Yufeng District (鱼峰区)	62,870	0.39%
Guangxi Zhuang Autonomous Region	Baise City	Lingyun County (凌云县)	58,655	0.36%
Guangxi Zhuang Autonomous Region	Qinzhou City	Qinnan District (钦南区)	58,571	0.36%
Guangxi Zhuang Autonomous Region	Laibin City	Jinxiu Yao Autonomous County (金秀瑶族自治县)	58,539	0.36%
Guangxi Zhuang Autonomous Region	Liuzhou City	Liubei District (柳北区)	57,290	0.35%
Guangxi Zhuang Autonomous Region	Liuzhou City	Rongshui Miao Autonomous County (融水苗族自治县)	56,770	0.35%
Yunnan Province	Wenshan Zhuang and Miao Autonomous Prefecture	Maguan County (马关县)	54,856	0.34%
Guangxi Zhuang Autonomous Region	Nanning City	Jiangnan District (江南区)	54,232	0.34%
Guangdong Province	Foshan City	Nanhai District (南海区)	50,007	0.31%
Guangdong Province	Qingyuan City	Lianshan Zhuang and Yao Autonomous County (连山壮族瑶族自治县)	44,141	0.27%
Guangxi Zhuang Autonomous Region	Guilin City	Lipu County (荔浦县)	41,425	0.26%
Guangxi Zhuang Autonomous Region	Hezhou City	Babu District (八步区)	40,532	0.25%
Yunnan Province	Honghe Hani and Yi Autonomous Prefecture	Mengzi City (蒙自市)	37,938	0.23%
Guangxi Zhuang Autonomous Region	Nanning City	Xingning District (兴宁区)	36,418	0.22%
Yunnan Province	Wenshan Zhuang and Miao Autonomous Prefecture	Malipo County (麻栗坡县)	33,250	0.21%
Guangdong Province	Zhongshan City	Urban area (市辖区)	31,666	0.2%
Guangxi Zhuang Autonomous Region	Guilin City	Longsheng Various Nationalities Autonomous County (龙胜各族自治县)	30,358	0.19%
Guangxi Zhuang Autonomous Region	Guilin City	Yangshuo County (阳朔县)	29,632	0.18%
Guangxi Zhuang Autonomous Region	Guilin City	Yongfu County (永福县)	25,564	0.16%
Yunnan Province	Wenshan Zhuang and Miao Autonomous Prefecture	Xichou County (西畴县)	24,212	0.15%
Guangdong Province	Shenzhen City	Longgang District (龙岗区)	22,708	0.14%
Yunnan Province	Qujing City	Shizong County (师宗县)	22,290	0.14%
Guangxi Zhuang Autonomous Region	Guilin City	Pingle County (平乐县)	21,744	0.13%
Guizhou Province	Qiandongnan Miao and Dong Autonomous Prefecture	Congjiang County (从江县)	21,419	0.13%
Guangxi Zhuang Autonomous Region	Hezhou City	Zhongshan County (钟山县)	20,834	0.13%
Guangdong Province	Foshan City	Shunde District (顺德区)	18,759	0.12%
Guangxi Zhuang Autonomous Region	Liuzhou City	Sanjiang Dong Autonomous County (三江侗族自治县)	18,335	0.11%
Guangxi Zhuang Autonomous Region	Qinzhou City	Lingshan County (灵山县)	17,715	0.11%
Guangxi Zhuang Autonomous Region	Fangchenggang City	Dongxing City (东兴市)	16,651	0.1%
Other			780,897	4.83%

== Notable Zhuang people ==
- A Nong (c. 1005–1055), Zhuang shaman, matriarch and warrior; mother of Nong Zhigao.
- Huang Wenxiu, Chinese politician and posthumous recipient of the July 1 Medal.
- Lady of Qiao Guo, heroine of the Zhuang people in Southern and Northern Dynasties.
- Liu Sanjie, legendary folk singer from the Song Dynasty.
- Nong Zhigao, hero of the Zhuang people in Song Dynasty.
- Nong Rong, diplomat and former ambassador to Pakistan.
- Shi Dakai, Yi King of the Taiping Rebellion.
- Wei Changhui, North King of the Taiping Rebellion.
- Huang Xianfan, Chinese historian and ethnologist, considered the founder of Zhuang studies.
- Li Ning, Chinese gymnast and entrepreneur.
- Esther Qin, Chinese-Australian diver.
- Shanye Huang, well-known Chinese-American artist whose art is rooted in Zhuang culture.
- Wei Wei, a Mandopop singer and actress.
- Wei Huixiao, a naval officer.
- Varihnaz, folk rock band.
- Tracy Wang 汪小敏 (zh), a singer.
- Chen Tang, Chinese-American actor
- Zhang Xianzi, a Mandopop singer.

== See also ==
- Zhuang languages
- Standard Zhuang
- Zhuang customs and culture
- Dong Son culture
- Mo (religion)
