= General History of the Zhuang =

History book by Huang Xianfan

- Author: Huang Xianfan, Zhang Yiming, Huang Zengqing
- Language: Chinese
- Genre: Zhuang History, History
- Publisher: Guangxi National Press
- Publication date: 1988
- Publication place: China
- Media type: Print (Paperback, Hardcover)
- Pages: 882
- ISBN: 7-5363-0422-6

The General History of the Zhuang Nationality (Traditional Chinese: 壯族通史; Simplified Chinese: 壮族通史; pinyin: Zhuàngzú tōng shi) is a history book by Huang Xianfan and his students Huang Zengqing and Zhang Yimin on Zhuang history. Published in 1988 after the first draft was completed in 1981, it covers the history, culture and language of the Zhuang ethnic group, one of China's 56 ethnic groups. This book covers a period from the presumed date of the emergence of the Zhuang ethnic group to the modern era, including prehistory and antiquity.

This 882-page book provides an overview of the origins, history, culture, language, art, literature, customs, folk song, the Dulao system, the Tusi system and the religious beliefs of the Zhuang ethnic group. This book is the first general history of the Zhuang ethnic group in the history of China.

"It is the first General History of the Zhuang in Chinese history and considered is the most innovative, scientific and academic theoretical value for the classical history book of the 20th century in China".

== Contents and argument ==
"This book is based on a wealth of historical materials, it explores in detail the origin of the Zhuang and has a comprehensive introduction to the Zhuang and the different historical periods of the political, economic and cultural aspects of their development. It provides a great deal of valuable information for research into the history of the Zhuang. The book has a very high value of academic research and has deep historical and practical significance".

Huang's major argument in the book is that he had consistently argued against ethnic chauvinism. He believed that the crux of ethnic problems were caused by ethnic inequality, which had a major influence on various ethnic conflicts in history.

Professor Huang advocated the equality of each of the world's ethnic groups and a "spiritual civilization with scientific attitude" on ethnic studies. He has been called a master of Zhuang studies.

Huang Xianfan had always emphasized "the importance of independent academic research", and of pioneering studies, academic freedom as his lifelong aspirations. His academic principle was to "stay honest and not obey the authorities". He believed that the motto of academic research was "no authorities, no ends, no prohibitions". Professor Chen Ji Sheng pointed out: "the connotation of Professor Huang's academic theory was to connect traditional Chinese history studies to western new history theory in order to complement his favorite Puxue of Qing dynasty, Gu Yanwu's theory of Jing Shi Zhi Yong with modern American Robinson's New History".

== Chapters ==
- Preamble
- Chapter one: Guangxi Zhuang is the indigenous peoples (p. 1-59)
- Chapter two: Primitive society (p. 60-140)
- Chapter three: Shang and Zhou dynasty (p. 141-171)
- Chapter four: Qin and Han dynasty (p. 172-225)
- Chapter five: Three Kingdoms, Jin, Southern and Northern Dynasties (p. 226-274)
- Chapter six: Sui, Tang and Five Dynasties and Ten Kingdoms Period (p. 275-308)
- Chapter seven: Song and Yuan dynasty (p. 309-353)
- Chapter eight: Ming and Qing dynasty (p. 354-414)
- Chapter nine: Republic of China period (p. 415-515)
- Chapter ten: Culture and arts (p. 516-651)
- Chapter eleven:Life and customs (p. 652-741)
- Chapter twelve: Ancient Zhuang people's struggle against (p. 742-785)
- Chapter thirteen:Modern Zhuang people's struggle against (p. 786-830)
- Conclusion:Zhuang people's contribution to the motherland (p. 831-836)
- Appendix:History Table of Cities and counties in Guangxi Zhuang region (p. 837-880)
- Postscript: (p. 881-882)

== See also ==
- (Chinese) Bagui school (八桂学派)
- Huang Xianfan
