= Laibin =

Laibin 来宾市 · Laizbinh Si
- Prefecture-level city
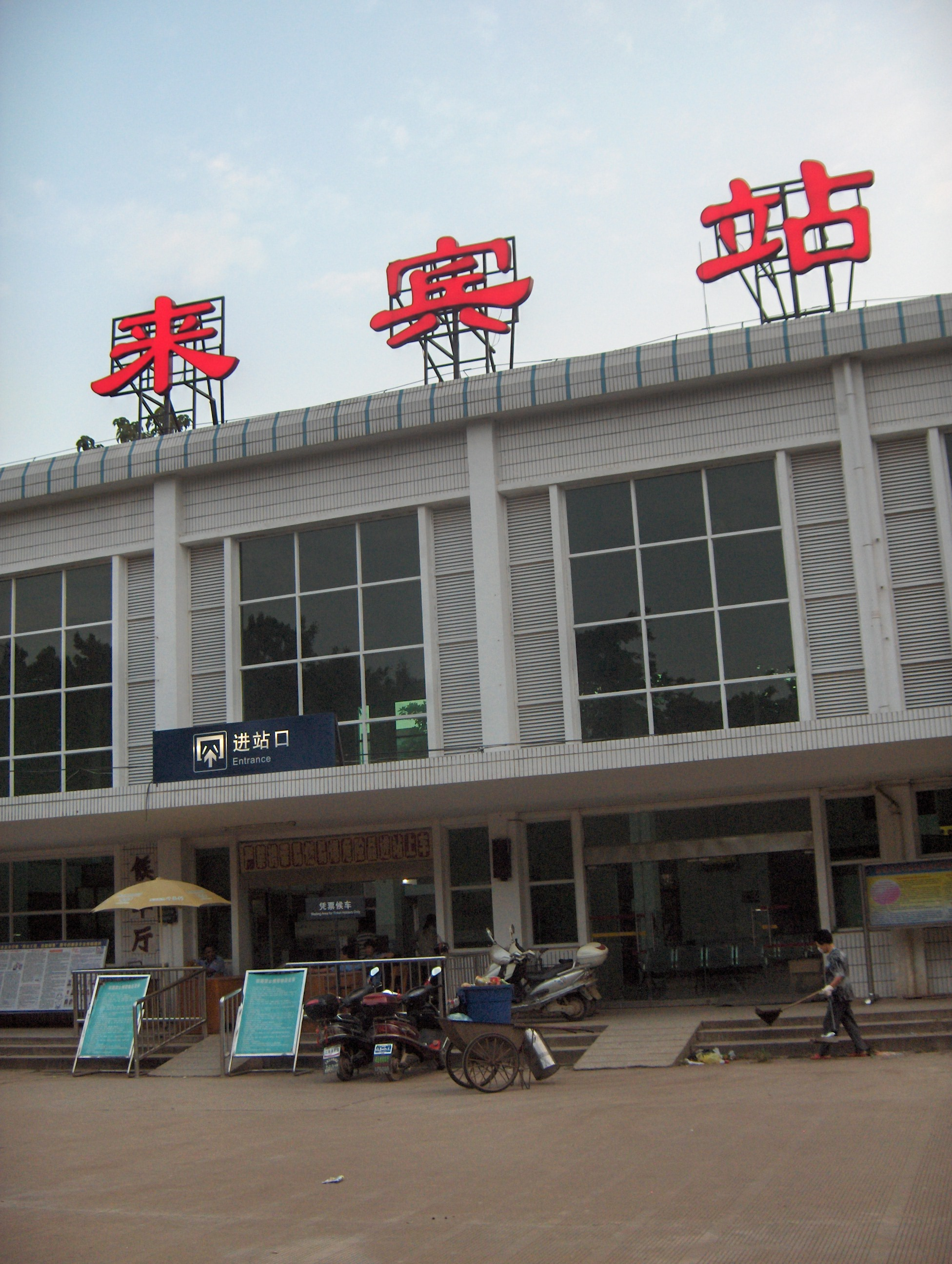
- Laibin Station

- Location of Laibin in Guangxi

- Location within China
- Coordinates (Laibin municipal government): 23°45′00″N 109°13′16″E
- Country: People's Republic of China
- Region: Guangxi
- Municipal seat: Xingbin District

Area
  - Total: 13,400 km^{2} (5,200 sq mi)

Population (2010)
  - Total: 2,498,236
  - Density: 186/km^{2} (483/sq mi)

GDP
  - Total: CN¥ 83.3 billion US$ 12.9 billion
  - Per capita: CN¥ 40,091; US$ 6,214
- Time zone: UTC+8 (China Standard)
- ISO 3166 code: CN-GX-13
- Website: laibin.gov.cn

Laibin (Chinese: 来宾市; pinyin: Láibīn) is a prefecture-level city in the central part of the Guangxi Zhuang Autonomous Region, China.

== History ==
Laibin is an ancient town with more than 2000 years of history. The area was settled in prehistoric times, more than 30,000 years ago.

== Geography and climate ==
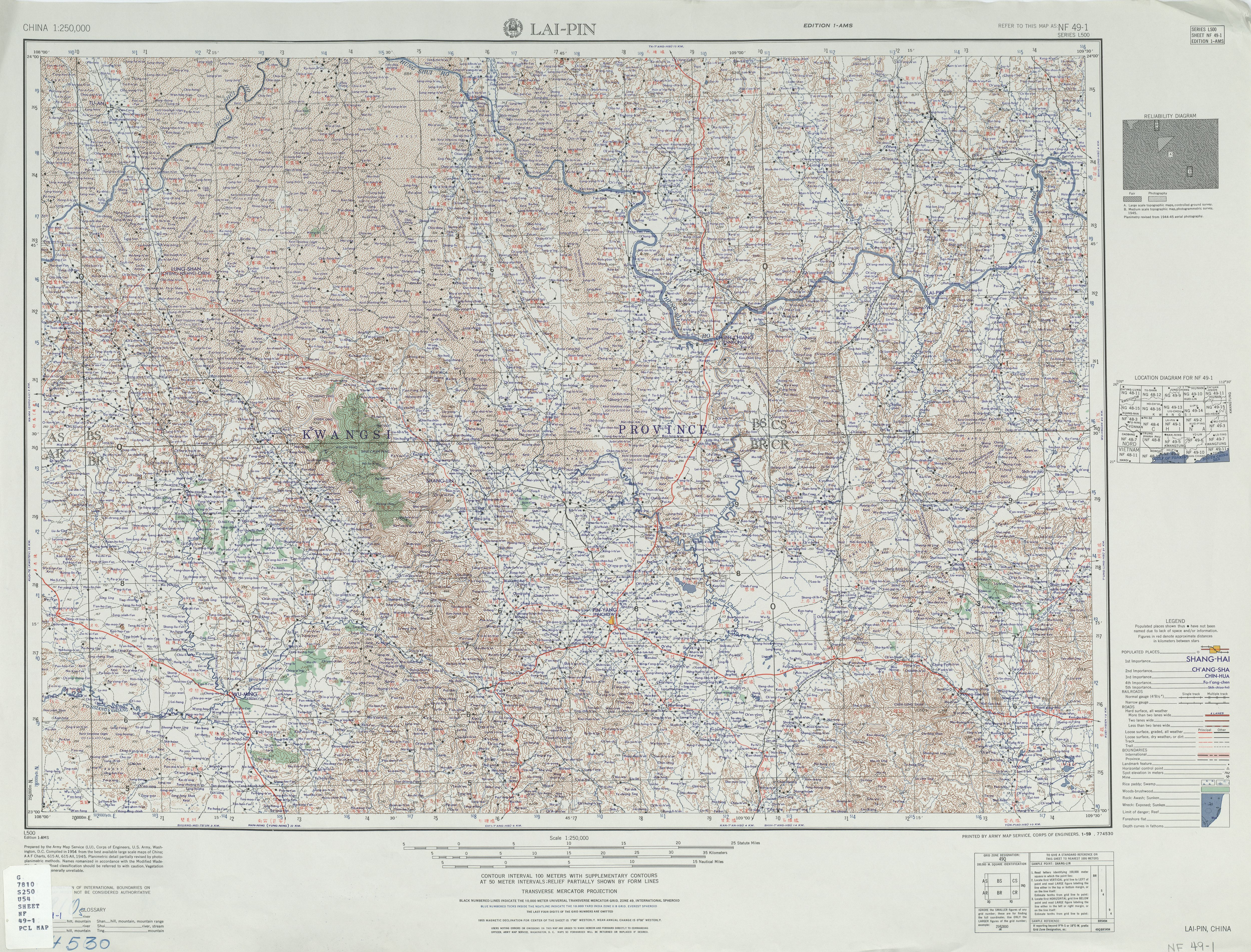
Laibin (labelled as LAI-PIN) (1954)

Laibin is located in central Guangxi. The Hongshui River or Red River and Rong River, both tributaries of the Xi River, meet in Laibin. Its administrative area is 13,400 square kilometres (5,200 sq mi), of which more than 43% is forested.

Climate data for Laibin, elevation 97 m (318 ft), (1991–2020 normals, extremes 1970–2018)
Month	Jan	Feb	Mar	Apr	May	Jun	Jul	Aug	Sep	Oct	Nov	Dec	Year
Record high °C (°F)	28.5 (83.3)	33.0 (91.4)	34.7 (94.5)	36.8 (98.2)	36.6 (97.9)	37.6 (99.7)	39.6 (103.3)	39.5 (103.1)	38.2 (100.8)	36.2 (97.2)	32.7 (90.9)	29.6 (85.3)	39.6 (103.3)
Mean daily maximum °C (°F)	15.1 (59.2)	17.3 (63.1)	20.2 (68.4)	26.0 (78.8)	30.0 (86.0)	31.9 (89.4)	33.1 (91.6)	33.4 (92.1)	31.8 (89.2)	28.2 (82.8)	23.4 (74.1)	18.0 (64.4)	25.7 (78.3)
Daily mean °C (°F)	11.2 (52.2)	13.5 (56.3)	16.5 (61.7)	21.9 (71.4)	25.6 (78.1)	27.7 (81.9)	28.6 (83.5)	28.6 (83.5)	26.8 (80.2)	23.1 (73.6)	18.2 (64.8)	13.1 (55.6)	21.2 (70.2)
Mean daily minimum °C (°F)	8.6 (47.5)	10.7 (51.3)	13.9 (57.0)	18.9 (66.0)	22.5 (72.5)	24.9 (76.8)	25.5 (77.9)	25.3 (77.5)	23.3 (73.9)	19.5 (67.1)	14.6 (58.3)	9.8 (49.6)	18.1 (64.6)
Record low °C (°F)	−0.9 (30.4)	−0.6 (30.9)	0.7 (33.3)	7.6 (45.7)	12.6 (54.7)	16.9 (62.4)	19.7 (67.5)	19.9 (67.8)	15.0 (59.0)	8.6 (47.5)	2.6 (36.7)	−1.2 (29.8)	−1.2 (29.8)
Average precipitation mm (inches)	53.7 (2.11)	40.1 (1.58)	84.5 (3.33)	95.3 (3.75)	208.9 (8.22)	290.3 (11.43)	204.6 (8.06)	159.9 (6.30)	93.9 (3.70)	53.8 (2.12)	50.9 (2.00)	38.3 (1.51)	1,374.2 (54.11)
Average precipitation days (≥ 0.1 mm)	11.0	10.7	16.3	14.0	15.8	17.5	16.4	13.9	9.3	6.6	6.8	7.9	146.2
Average snowy days	0.2	0	0	0	0	0	0	0	0	0	0	0.1	0.3
Average relative humidity (%)	74	76	80	78	78	82	79	78	74	70	71	69	76
Mean monthly sunshine hours	60.9	52.4	42.0	76.0	116.7	121.6	177.3	185.4	176.7	161.1	125.3	105.3	1,400.7
Percentage possible sunshine	18	16	11	20	28	30	43	47	48	45	38	32	31
Source: China Meteorological Administration

== Administration ==
Laibin administers 1 district, 1 county-level city 3 counties, and 1 autonomous county.

District:

- Xingbin District (兴宾区)

County-level city:

- Heshan City (合山市)

Counties:

- Xincheng County (忻城县)
- Xiangzhou County (象州县)
- Wuxuan County (武宣县)

Autonomous county:

- Jinxiu Yao Autonomous County (金秀瑶族自治县)

Map
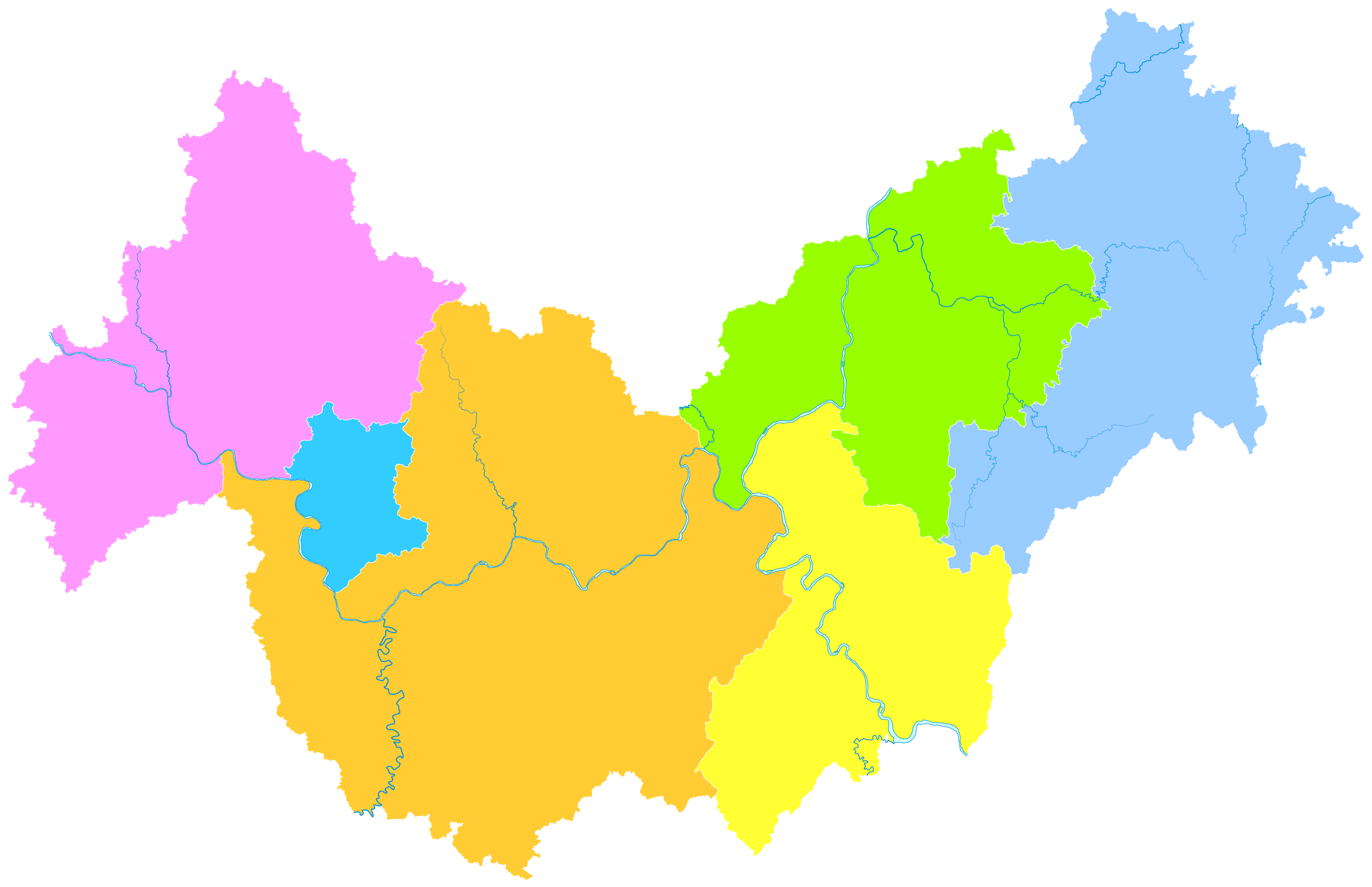

== Demographics ==
Laibin's population is 2,498,236 (2010). 69.4% of the people belong to the Zhuang ethnic group. The rest include Han, Yao, and other ethnic groups.By the end of 2024, the total registered population of the city is 2,657,100. The resident population of the city is 2,020,300.

English name	Simplified	Traditional	Pinyin	Zhuang	Area	Population (2010)
Xingbin District	兴宾区	興賓區	Xīngbīn Qū	Sinhbinh Gih	4,404	1,015,165 (68.27% of the people belong to the Zhuang ethnic group, 2010)
Xincheng County	忻城县	忻城縣	Xīnchéng Xiàn	Yinhcwngz Yen	2,541	405,384 (90.92% of the people belong to the Zhuang ethnic group, 2010)
Xiangzhou County	象州县	象州縣	Xiàngzhōu Xiàn	Cienghcou Yen	1,899	354,918 (70.4% of the people belong to the Zhuang ethnic group, 2010)
Wuxuan County	武宣县	武宣縣	Wǔxuān Xiàn	Mouxsien Yen	2,485	431,330 (67.17% of the people belong to the Zhuang ethnic group, 2010)
Jinxiu Yao Autonomous County	金秀瑶族自治县	金秀瑤族自治縣	Jīnxiù Yáozú Zìzhìxiàn	Ginhsiu Yauzcuz Swci Yen	2,517	152,212 (43.97% of the people belong to the Zhuang ethnic group, 2010)
Heshan	合山市		Héshān Shì	Hozsan Si	350	139,227 (69.55% of the people belong to the Zhuang ethnic group, 2010)

- These figures are based on the following official statistics:

== Economy ==
Laibin is an important transportation hub with several regional and national highways, important rail lines, and shipping along the Hongshui River to Hong Kong, Macau, and Guangzhou. Agriculture is a major industry, with sugarcane, rice, peanuts, tea, and fruits being the major crops. There are more than 600 industries in Laibin, including sugar processing, powerplants, construction materials, mining, and Chinese medicine. The area produces 1/4 of the world's indium.

== Culture ==
Laibin is filled with numerous examples of unique ethnic minority culture, especially from the Yao. There are also many types of dance found only in the area, including the Bamboo Horse, the Colorful Butterfly, the Dragon Fish, the Emerald, the Bright Lantern, and the Yao dance, the Monkey Drum.

== Notable people ==
- Xiao Qiaogui (蕭朝貴) (1821–1852) Taiping general.
- Zhai Fuwen (翟富文) (1866–1942) educator, author, and national assembly representative for Guangxi province
- Liu Ceqi (劉策奇) (1895–1927) revolutionary hero and martyr, Zhuang.
- Mo Jiangbai (莫江白) (1918–1949) revolutionary hero and martyr, Zhuang.
- Zhang Hua (张华) (1911–1990) military and political figure.
- Jin Baosheng (金宝生) (1927– ) military and political figure, Yao.
- Han Feng (韩锋) (1956– ) Tobacco monopoly apparatchik outed in 2010 as a "Chinese Casanova".
- Jing Xianfa ( ) (1957– ) Current Mayor of Laibin.
