= Wei Huixiao =

Chinese naval officer

- 韦慧晓

Captain of Type 052D destroyer Shaoxing
- Incumbent
- Assumed office April 2022

Personal details
- Born: November 1977 (age 48) Baise, Guangxi, China
- Party: Chinese Communist Party
- Education: Nanjing University; Sun Yat-sen University; Dalian Naval Academy

Military service
- Allegiance: People's Republic of China
- Branch/service: People's Liberation Army Navy
- Years of service: 2012–present
- Rank: Captain

Chinese name
- Simplified Chinese: 韦慧晓
- Traditional Chinese: 韋慧曉
Transcriptions
Standard Mandarin
- Hanyu Pinyin: Wéi Huìxiǎo

Wei Huixiao (Chinese: 韦慧晓; born November 1977) is a Chinese naval officer who is the current captain of Type 052D destroyer Shaoxing, in office since March 2022. She is a representative of the 19th National Congress of the Chinese Communist Party.

== Biography ==
Wei was born into a Zhuang ethnicity family in Baise, Guangxi, in November 1977.

== Education and early career ==
In 1996, she entered Nanjing University. In October 1998, the university awarded the "Honorary Doctor" degree to former U.S. President George H. W. Bush. The university determined Wei to be the messenger of flowers. When she congratulated Bush in fluent English, Bush held her hand and said, "you are a beautiful girl."

After graduating in 2000, she joined Huawei as a senior vice president secretary and administrative assistant, and won the company's "Gold Medal Individual" award and the title of "Gold Medal Team" for her excellent performance. In 2004, she became a graduate student at the Department of Earth Sciences, Sun Yat-sen University. During her studies, she became a volunteer in Nyingchi, Wenchuan County and later the 2008 Beijing Olympic Games.

== Military career ==
Wei enlisted in the People's Liberation Army (PLA) in January 2012 and became a crew member at the Chinese aircraft carrier Liaoning. After studying navigation command and ship tactical command from Dalian Naval Academy in March 2014, she was promoted to deputy chief of Navigation Department of the Chinese aircraft carrier Liaoning. In January 2015, she visited the United States as a member of the delegation of the first batch of navy ship captains. In April 2015, she was promoted to practice vice captain of the Changchun destroyer and was promoted again to vice captain in March 2016. In 2017, she was reassigned as vice captain of the Zhengzhou destroyer, and was elevated to practice captain in February 2018. In April 2022, she rose to become captain of Type 052D destroyer Shaoxing, becoming the first female captain of the People's Liberation Army Navy.
