= Han Feng =

Chinese businessman

Han Feng (韩锋) was a Chinese businessman. He was a member of the Chinese Communist Party (CCP) and a senior official of China Tobacco. In early 2010, he was fired and expelled from the party due to corruption and his love life being exposed on the internet from his diary. The scandal soon became one of the most popular stories in Chinese cyberspace. Despite the scandal and arrest, most netizens overwhelmingly believe Han Feng is a good CCP official.

== Career ==
Han was born in Qinzhou, Guangxi, China. He originally attended Guangxi University and studied Chinese language. After graduation he went to Shangsi County and was selected as Qinzhou office secretary. After 1988 he became the tobacco secretary of the Guanxi region. Ten years later he became a director of the China National Tobacco Corporation. He married one of his classmates who also worked in a tobacco bureau. On February 26, 2003, he was made head director of its Laibin municipal bureau. In 2009 he was transferred to the Guangxi tobacco monopoly bureau as a director of the sales division.

== Arrest ==
On March 13, 2010, Han Feng was arrested and expelled from the CCP. After investigation, Han, at the age of 53, was removed from his tobacco bureau division chief post for allegedly accepting bribes totaling 482,000 yuan. He also accepted an apartment worth 300,000 yuan. The bribes were taken between 2002 and 2010.

== Responses ==
A star blogger, Han Han wrote a post titled "Han Feng is a good cadre" which commented on the online leak of the diary. The blogger said that Han Feng was a good official since the amount of bribes and number of sexual relationships he had was no comparison to other CCP officials. He then conducted an online survey and concluded that 96% of 210,000 voters with independent IP addresses felt Han Feng was a good official.
