= Zhuang studies =

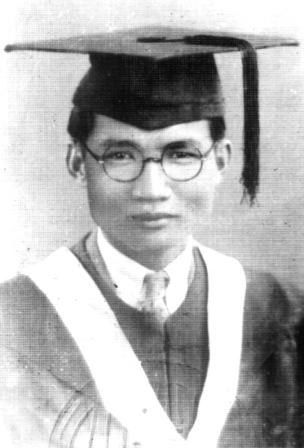
Huang Xianfan’s graduation photo.

Zhuang studies (or Zhuangology; Standard Zhuang: Cuenghhag; simplified Chinese: 壮学; traditional Chinese: 壯學; pinyin: Zhuàngxué) is an interdisciplinary intellectual field concerned with the Zhuang people – their history, anthropology, religion, politics, languages, and literature. The majority of such research is being carried out in the People's Republic of China. Huang Xianfan (黄现璠) is considered by many to be the father of Zhuang studies.

== Features ==
Areas commonly included under this rubric include history of Zhuang, literature of Zhuang, art of Zhuang, music of Zhuang, language of Zhuang, sociology of Zhuang, political science of Zhuang, economics of Zhuang, folklore of Zhuang, and ethnomusicology of Zhuang. It may be compared to other ethnic groups studies disciplines, such as Tai studies and Yao studies. Zhuang studies is sometimes included within a broader regional area of focus including: "Lingnan studies", "Yue people studies","South Asia studies", or "ASEAN Studies".

== History ==
Zhuang studies is a relatively new discipline.

Huang Xianfan may be considered as the first Zhuangologist and he did much to make Zhuang known in China. Since 1950, Huang Xianfan led the group making a largest and deepest investigation on ethnic history and traditional culture in Guangxi history. They had collected a lot of valuable materials and laid a foundation for further research on Zhuang ethnic social and historical culture. That was a very important beginning for later development of Zhuang ethnic research and establishment of Guangxi institute of ethnic studies. Therefore, the inception of Zhuang studies as an authentic academic discipline is thus associated with the first ethnologist Huang Xianfan de Zhuang who is considered as its founder to present day, the other early zhuang studies of note being Huang Zengqing (Huang group's member and the first archaeological researcher of the Guangxi) who in 1957 occupied the first chair for Zhuang's archaeology studies in China and Zhou Zuoqiou, who was primarily the pioneering subject of the zhuang literature in Guangxi Normal University.

The Bagui School (The first ethnic school in China and pioneer is Huang Xianfan) was particularly significant for the development of the discipline since the early 1950s with Huang Xianfan, Huang Zengqing, Ban Xiouwen, Ou Yang Ruoxiou, Qin Cailuan, Qin Naichang, Qin Shengmin, He Longqun, Yu Shijie, Qin Deqing, Pan Qixu, Huang Hanjin and Zeng Chaoxiong.,

In 1957, the Guangxi government established the Guangxi institute of ethnic studies to promote Zhuang studies around China. In 1991 the Guangxi Zhuang Studies Society was established, and in April 1999 the first international Zhuang studies conference was held in Wuming with scholars from 8 different countries.

Over the last few decades in other countries the studies of the Zhuang have opened towards other disciplines, resulting in works with interdisciplinary approach. As examples of such open-minded Zhuang researcher we might mention the American anthropologist Jeffrey Barlow, among others, who has done noted research and publications on lexical questions, about Zhuang culture and the modern history of Zhuang. Others are Japanese anthropologist Chikada Sigeyuki, Australian anthropologist David Holm, and many more.

== Literature ==
- Huang Xianfan (黄现璠): 《Brief History of the Zhuang》 (广西壮族简史), Guangxi Peoples's Press, 1957.
- Huang Xianfan (黄现璠): 《Nong Zhi Gao》 (遗著), Guangxi Peoples's Press, 1983.
- Huang Xianfan (黄现璠等): 《General History of the Zhuang》 (壮族通史,遗著), Guangxi national Press, 1988.
- 《First University Professor of Zhuang Nationality – Huang Xianfan》(第一位壮族教授 – 黄现璠), Guangxi ethnic newspaper, 1999.
- Mu Jun: 《A Master of Zhuang Ethnic Studies – Huang Xianfan》 (壮学之父黄现璠), Guangxi's daily, 2002.
- Chen Ji Sheng:《On Professor Huang Xian Fan's Practice and Construction to Chinese 20th Century's New History》, Guangxi Social Sciences, 1st Issue, 2007.
- Huang Xianfan (黄现璠): 《A Critical Biography of Wei Ba Qun》 (遗作), Guangxi Normal University Press, 2008.
- Chen Ji Sheng:《On Bagui School of Chinese Ethnology》 (试论中国民族学的八桂学派), Guangxi Social Sciences, 7th–11th Issues, 2008.
- 金丽: 《壮族历史与文化导论》 (英文版,北京：民族出版社，2007年). Jin Li: Zhuang History and Culture: An Introductory Study – (Beijing, The Ethnic Publishing House, 2007). Note: This book is written in English by Professor Jin Li of Guangxi University for Nationalities. It is addressed to two groups of readers for two different purposes. First, it is hoped that Chinese students whose majors are related to Zhuang studies would by reading this book be exposed to academic writing in English on relevant subjects. Second, it may be beneficial to English-speaking people who have an interest in the Zhuang, their history and their culture.
