= Shanye Huang =

Chinese-American artist

- 黃閃夜
- Huang in March 2008
- Born: 1958 (age 67–68)
- Education: Guangxi Arts Institute & China Academy of Fine Arts
- Website: www.shanyehuang.com

Shanye Huang (Chinese: 黃閃夜; born 1958) is a Chinese-born American professional artist. He currently resides in Washington DC metropolitan area. He is most known for his bold, vibrant, colorful imagery bridges the Zhuang folkloric heritage of his native Guangxi, China with Western surrealism and color field traditions as well as the disciplined skills of Chinese academic painting.

== Early life and education ==
Shanye Huang was born and raised in a Zhuang Ethnic family in Guangxi, Southwest China; a region known for its vibrant folk arts. He has maintained a lifelong fascination with the power, mystery and beauty of Chinese folk arts and culture. Mr. Huang graduated with a major in Fine Art from Guangxi Arts Institute of China. In 1985, at an age of twenty-six, Huang was inducted into the most prestigious art organization in China, the China Artists Association. In 1988, he completed his advanced graduate study in the China Central Academy of Fine Arts in Beijing. Huang taught painting and drawing in the Guangxi Arts Institute from 1985 to 1993. After his solo exhibition in England in 1993, Shanye Huang came to the United States at the invitation of the Center for International Art & Culture in New York, and the Exhibition Committee of California State University, Northridge (CSUN) to hold a solo exhibition. However, due to the Northridge earthquake, the show was postponed until 1998. Huang was then granted a permanent visa to stay in the United States under an outstanding artist status. Shanye Huang also was invited as a guest speaker on Chineses Art in Loyola Marymount University in Los Angeles from 1995 to 1999. He currently lives and works in Washington, D.C. metropolitan area, USA.

== Art and career ==
Shanye Huang's art has earned him several national and international awards and has been collected by museums, galleries as well as private collectors. His work has been widely shown, including the International Museum of Art in Texas, Clymer Museum of Art in Washington, The Las Cruces Museum of Fine Art in New Mexico, Andrew Art Museum in North Carolina, Brentwood Arts Exchange in Maryland, Brazilian Museum of Sculpture-MuBE in São Paulo, Brazil, the National Art Museum of China in Beijing, and the New York Art Collection in New York. His solo exhibitions have been held in Asia, Europe and North America.

- 1998, the Los Angeles Times had a special review of his solo exhibition in The Art Gallery of California State University, Northridge(CSUN).
- 2004, Huang's work Echo was selected by CSUN Professor and well-known artist Kim Abeles as a part of the permanent Public Art installation in the Civic Center of San Fernando Valley, Los Angeles, California.
- His work inspired well-known American conductor and composer Silas Huff to create a 25-minute dance symphony, Chun Zhi Ge. In March 2009, accompanied by the Astoria Symphony and using Huang's artwork as a backdrop, the Ballet Repertory of New York City and the Long Island City Ballet brought the charming story to life in at the LaGuardia Performing Arts Center in New York City. Again, in October 2011, the Troupe were invited to perform the Ballet in a condensed form in the 13th Nanning International Folk Song Arts Festival at the 8th China-ASEAN Expo 2011

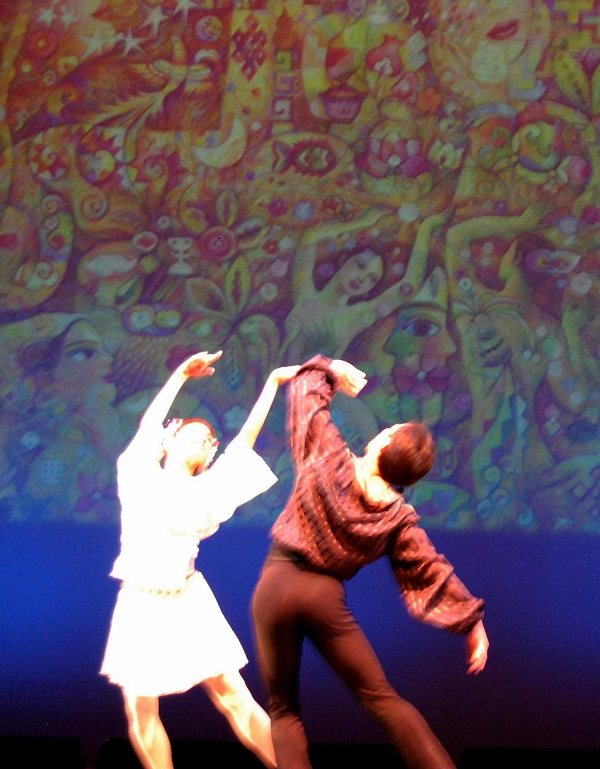
Shanye Huang's work Tapestry of Dreams was made into an American Ballet Chun Zhi Ge-Spring Song Dance, which was premiered in 2009 in NYC.

- 2010 Solo Exhibition: BEYOND BOUNDARIES - The ART of SHANYE HUANG was the first solo show chosen to be held at the newly built Brentwood Arts Center nearby Washington DC, accompanied by an illustrated catalogue with an essay by Dr. Jason C. Kuo, Professor of Art History, University of Maryland.
- 2011, with works by Andy Warhol, Salvador Dalí, Norman Rockwell, and Rembrandt Harmenszoon van Rijn, Blessing, a bold vibrant oil painting by Shanye Huang, has been selected for inclusion in the crossing cultures and centuries international exhibition “On Being Human: Love, Faith, Shame, and Hope” presented by PICTURE Art Foundation, Los Angeles, California.
- 2012, his work "The Trees and Vines Intertwine #5 " won the Award of Excellence in an "International Exhibition of Overseas Chinese Paintings & Calligraphy" held at the National Museum of China in Beijing, China.
- 2013, Shanye Huang's work were selected to the Cultural Exchanges—a juried exhibition at Betty Mae Kramer Gallery, Silver Spring, MD. China Daily USA did an interview at the opening: Artist bridges Chinese and Western styles through his paintings. At the end of the exhibition, Shanye Huang's paintings were selected to be part of public art placed in Downtown Silver Spring, MD in 2014.
- 2016, Huang's work Transformation #1(painted paper-cut on canvas) is selected by Nora Atkinson, the curator of the Renwick Gallery of Smithsonian American Art Museum, into the Making Sense juried art exhibition at the McLean Project for the Arts in DC area.
- 2019, Shanye Huang's painting Connection #2 is chosen to be part of the 4th Biennial Maryland Regional Juried Art at the art gallery of the University of Maryland Global Campus and featured on the cover page of its art catalogue.
- 2021, The personal experiences and observations during the COVID-19 pandemic deepens Shanye Huang's commitment to using art to foster hope and positive energies. In his solo exhibition- Life Imprint at the Art Gallery of CCACC, his work explores the resilient human spirit with large-scale painted paper-cut collections. The Washington Post weekend edition using Shanye Huang as the title reviews his works on view. He is also awarded several art grants including the Creative Projects grant (MD), the Contemporary Art Foundation grant (New York), the American Artists Foundation grant (Chicago). Carolyn Bevans, a museum specialist at the National Gallery of Art, visits Shanye Huang's studio for an exclusive interview and writes an essay for Shanye Huang's solo exhibition.
- 2022, Together with Executive Director Allison Weiss and Folklife Specialist Doug Peach from the Sandy Springs Museum, Shanye Huang presents a talk about his works and collaborations with the museum at the Maryland Arts Summit. His work The Dawn is Approaching is awarded and collected by the Art Bank Collection of the D.C. Commissions on Arts and Humanities. He was also awarded the Creative Project grant by the Maryland State Arts Council's and the Artist and Scholar Project grant by the Arts and Humanity Council of Montgomery County.
- 2023, Shanye Huang participates as master artist in a 2022-2023 Folklife Apprenticeship on Chinese Painted paper-cutting. He was awarded the art grant for the New Works Planning in public art and Artist Grant from MSAC. The professional filming crew from Wide Angle Youth Media (WAYM) have done a series of filming Shanye Huang at work and his art at Shanye Huang Studio and Sandy Spring Museum, funded in part by the Maryland State Council of the Arts. The final film has been included in Maryland's traditional cultural and artistic heritage archives.
