= Heshan, Guangxi =

Heshan 合山市 · Hozsanh Si
- County-level city
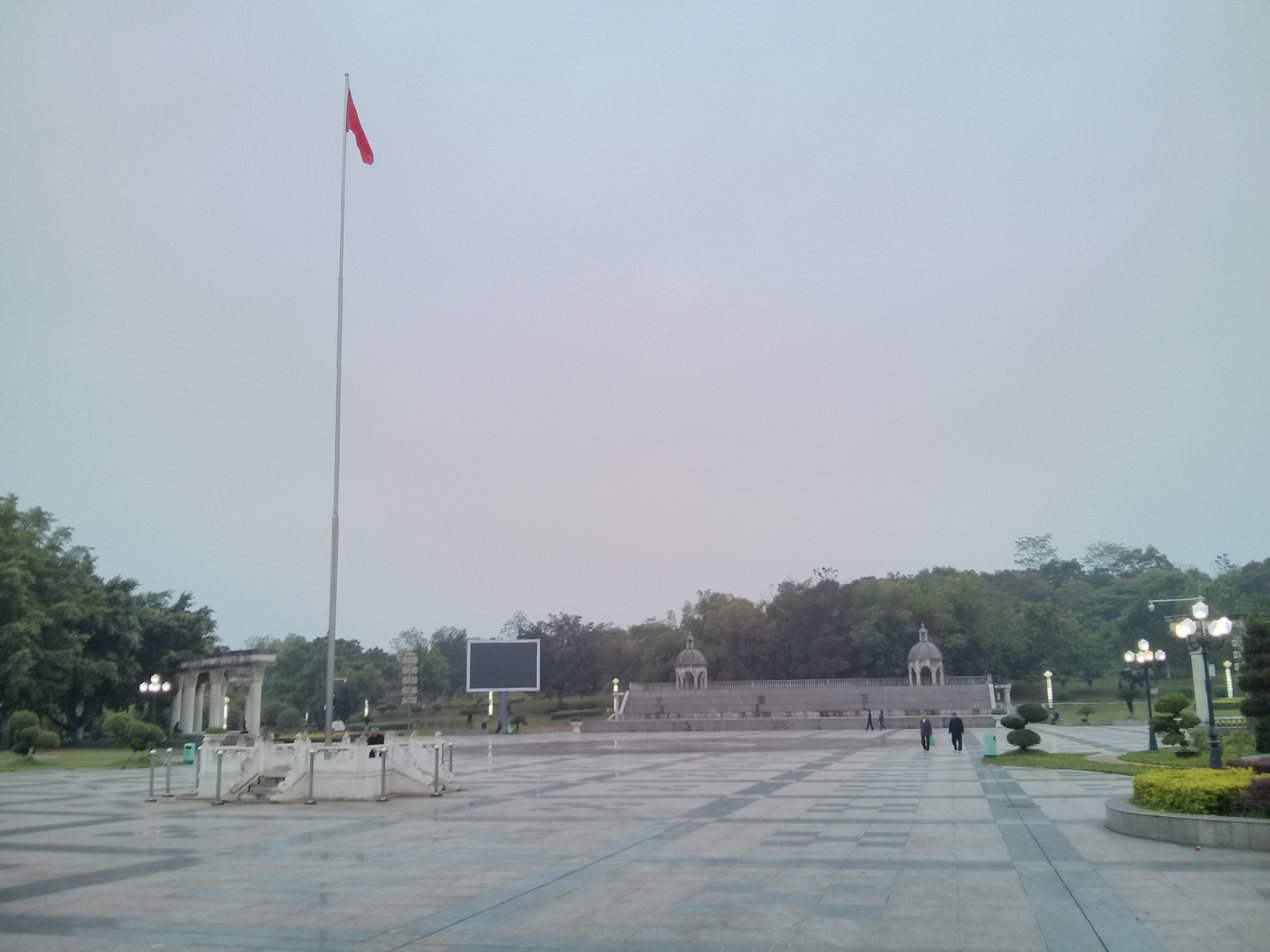

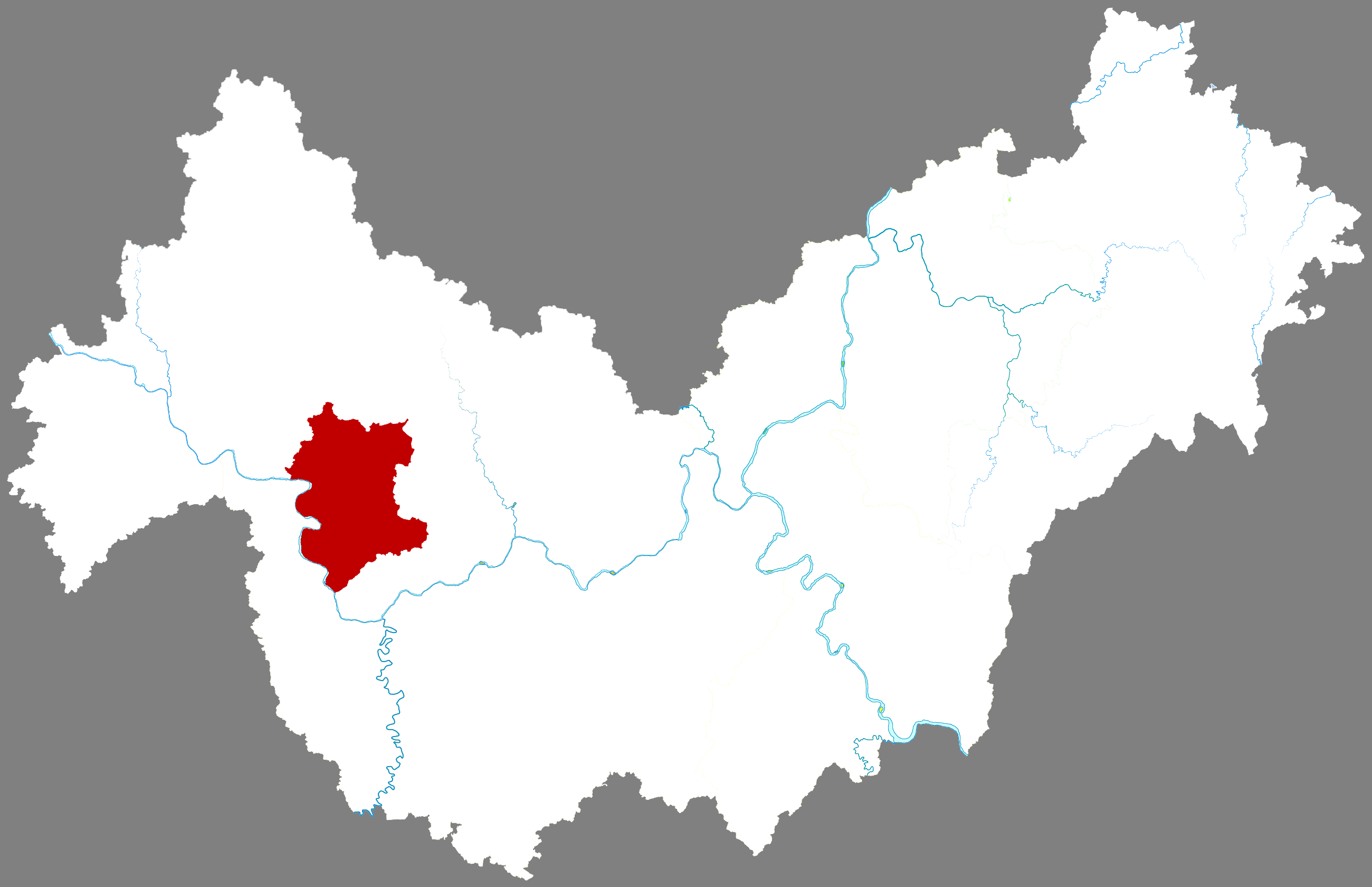
- Location of the county in Laibin
- Coordinates: 23°48′N 108°53′E
- Country: China
- Region: Guangxi
- Prefecture-level city: Laibin
- Township-level divisions: 3 towns
- Municipal seat: Lingnan (岭南镇)

Area
  - Total: 350 km^{2} (140 sq mi)
- Elevation: 125 m (410 ft)

Population (2020)
  - Total: 98,938
  - Density: 280/km^{2} (730/sq mi)
- Time zone: UTC+8 (China Standard)

Heshan (Chinese: 合山; pinyin: Héshān) is a county-level city of central Guangxi, China, located on the lower reaches of the Hongshui River. It is under the administration of Laibin City.

== Administrative divisions ==
Heshan administers 3 towns:

- Lingnan (岭南镇)
- Beisi (北泗镇)
- Heli (河里镇)
