= Huang Xianfan =

Chinese historian, ethnologist and educator

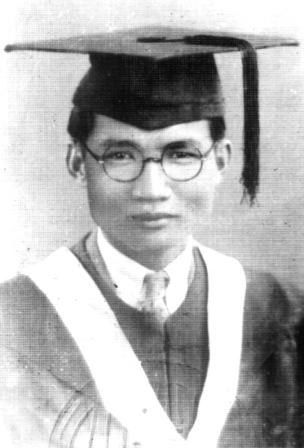
- Huang Xianfan graduation photo
- Born: Gan Jinying (甘錦英/甘锦英); 13 November 1899; Fusui, China
- Died: 18 January 1982 (aged 82); Guilin, China
- Resting place: Guangxi Government Cemetery
- Education: Beijing Normal University (1926–1935); Tokyo Imperial University (1935–1937)
- Occupations: Representatives of the National People's Congress (NPC), Members of the CPPCC National Committee
- Known for: Zhuang studies (壮学之父), work in the Bagui and Wunu schools (八桂学派和无奴学派领袖)
- Political party: Chinese Peasants' and Workers' Democratic Party
- Spouse: Liu Lihua (刘丽华, Teacher)
- Children: 9

Huang Xianfan (Zhuang: Vangz Yenfanh; simplified Chinese: 黄现璠; traditional Chinese: 黄現璠; pinyin: Huáng Xiànfán; Wade–Giles: Huáng Hsiènfán; November 13, 1899 – January 18, 1982) was a Zhuang Chinese historian, ethnologist and educator.

== Sources ==
- Huang Xianfan's Autobiography. As Told by Huang Xianfan,Gan Wenjie, Gan Wenhao, and Gan Jinshan(ed.). Guangxi Normal University Press，2018. ISBN 754950038X, 9787549500383 (Guangxi Normal University Press).
- Who's Who in the Modern Republic of China and Manchukuo. Intelligence Department of the Japanese Ministry of Foreign Affairs (ed.). Published by Association for the Common Culture of East Asia, 1937. p. 177 (National Diet Library)
- Dictionary of Modern Chinese Names. Tokyo: Japanese Kazankai Foundation, 1957, 1962, 1966, 1972, 1982, 1986 editions. pp. 189, 208, 327, 325, 318, 588.(National Diet Library)
- Great Dictionary of Chinese Names - Volume of Contemporary Figures. Editorial Committee of the Great Dictionary of Chinese Names(ed.). Shanghai: Shanghai Lexicographical Press, 1992. p. 1861. ISBN 7532602079, 9787532602070 (Google books)
- Great Dictionary of Contemporary Chinese Cultural Celebrities. Editorial Committee of the Great Dictionary of Contemporary Chinese Cultural Celebrities(ed.). Beijing: Chinese Radio and Television Press，1992.p. 519. ISBN 7504315133, 9787504315137 (Google books)
- 2,300 Chinese Celebrities That Every Chinese Should Know. Li Ke、Zhou Xiaomeng、Shen Zhi(ed.). Wànjuàn Publishing Company，2009.p. 209. ISBN 7547003540, 9787547003541 (Google books)
- Great Dictionary of Education. Editorial Committee of the Great Dictionary of Chinese Education(ed.). Shanghai:Shanghai Education Press，1998.p. 1450. ISBN 7532053806, 9787532053803 (Google books)
- Great Dictionary of the Cultures of Chinese Ethnic Minorities - Volume for the Central-Southern and Southeastern Regions. Tiemuer Dawamat(ed.). Nationalities Press，1999.p. 143-144. ISBN 7105033894, 9787105033898 (Google books)
