= Xincheng County =

Xincheng County 忻城县 · Yinhcwngz Yen
- County
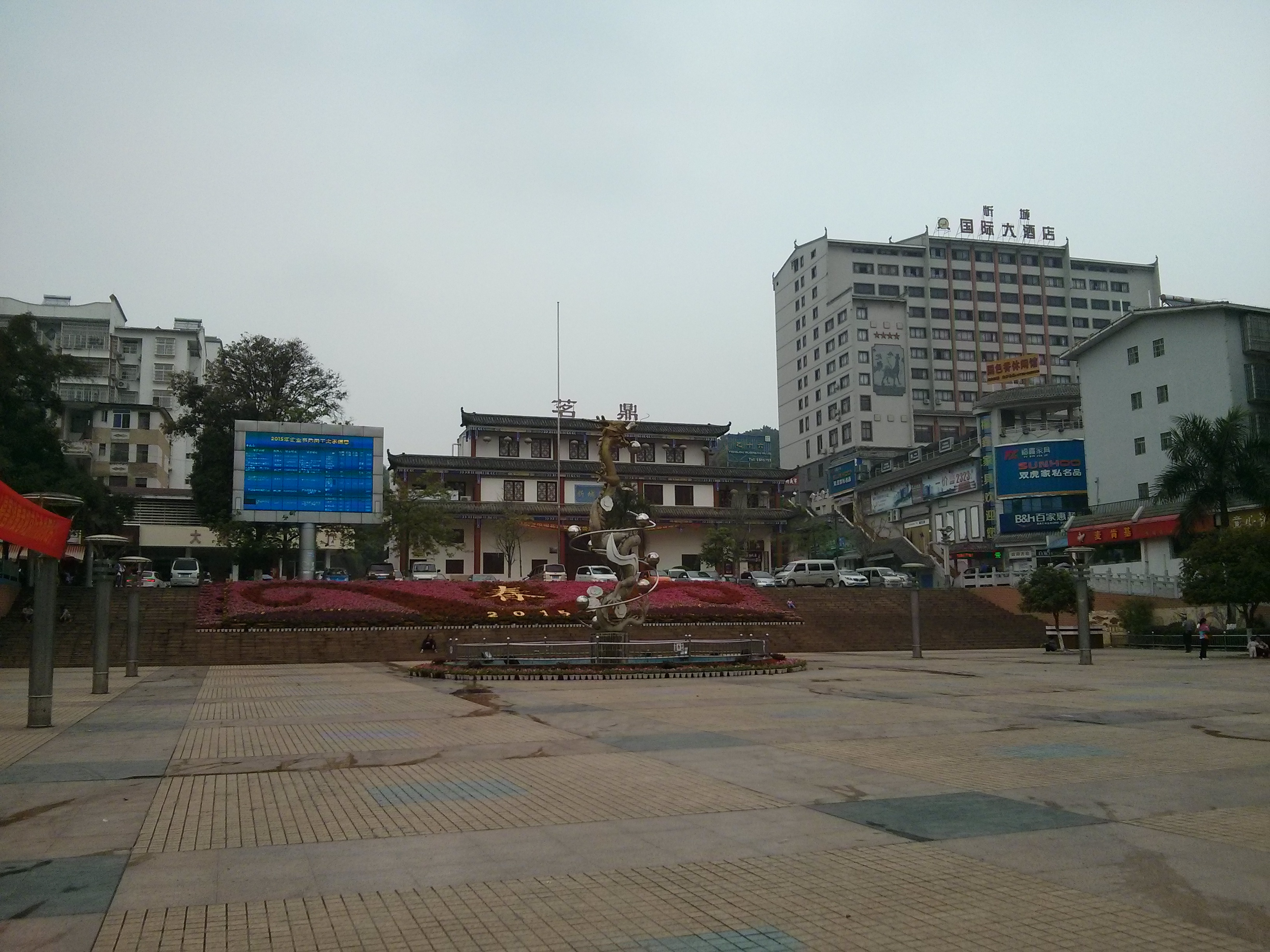

- Location of the seat in Guangxi
- Coordinates: 24°03′58″N 108°39′57″E
- Country: China
- Autonomous region: Guangxi
- Prefecture-level city: Laibin
- County seat: Chengguan

Area
  - Total: 2,541 km^{2} (981 sq mi)

Population (2020)
  - Total: 297,825
  - Density: 117.2/km^{2} (303.6/sq mi)
- Time zone: UTC+8 (China Standard)

Xincheng County (Chinese: 忻城县; pinyin: Xīnchéng Xiàn; Zhuang: Yinhcwngz Yen) is a county in the central part of Guangxi, China. It is the westernmost county-level division of the prefecture-level city of Laibin.

== Administrative divisions ==
Xincheng County is divided into 6 towns and 6 townships:

Towns:

- Chengguan 城关镇
- Datang 大塘镇
- Silian 思练镇
- Hongdu 红渡镇
- Gupeng 古蓬镇
- Guosui 果遂镇

Townships:

- Masi 马泗乡
- Oudong 欧洞乡
- Andong 安东乡
- Xinwei 新圩乡
- Suiyi 遂意乡
- Beigeng 北更乡

== Climate ==
Climate data for Xincheng, elevation 148 m (486 ft), (1991–2020 normals, extremes 1981–2010)
Month	Jan	Feb	Mar	Apr	May	Jun	Jul	Aug	Sep	Oct	Nov	Dec	Year
Record high °C (°F)	28.3 (82.9)	33.9 (93.0)	35.7 (96.3)	36.1 (97.0)	37.6 (99.7)	37.3 (99.1)	39.5 (103.1)	38.8 (101.8)	38.7 (101.7)	36.0 (96.8)	33.8 (92.8)	29.5 (85.1)	39.5 (103.1)
Mean daily maximum °C (°F)	15.1 (59.2)	17.4 (63.3)	20.4 (68.7)	26.1 (79.0)	29.9 (85.8)	31.8 (89.2)	33.0 (91.4)	33.3 (91.9)	31.7 (89.1)	27.9 (82.2)	23.4 (74.1)	18.1 (64.6)	25.7 (78.2)
Daily mean °C (°F)	11.3 (52.3)	13.5 (56.3)	16.6 (61.9)	21.8 (71.2)	25.4 (77.7)	27.5 (81.5)	28.3 (82.9)	28.3 (82.9)	26.5 (79.7)	22.8 (73.0)	18.2 (64.8)	13.3 (55.9)	21.1 (70.0)
Mean daily minimum °C (°F)	8.7 (47.7)	10.8 (51.4)	13.9 (57.0)	18.8 (65.8)	22.2 (72.0)	24.5 (76.1)	25.2 (77.4)	25.0 (77.0)	22.9 (73.2)	19.2 (66.6)	14.6 (58.3)	10.0 (50.0)	18.0 (64.4)
Record low °C (°F)	0.3 (32.5)	0.6 (33.1)	2.5 (36.5)	8.0 (46.4)	13.5 (56.3)	17.7 (63.9)	20.4 (68.7)	20.4 (68.7)	14.3 (57.7)	9.2 (48.6)	3.6 (38.5)	0.4 (32.7)	0.3 (32.5)
Average precipitation mm (inches)	52.4 (2.06)	34.8 (1.37)	69.8 (2.75)	98.1 (3.86)	215.0 (8.46)	320.4 (12.61)	237.0 (9.33)	201.0 (7.91)	92.4 (3.64)	70.9 (2.79)	53.4 (2.10)	40.6 (1.60)	1,485.8 (58.48)
Average precipitation days (≥ 0.1 mm)	11.3	10.2	16.1	14.1	15.6	18.7	17.4	15.2	9.4	7.9	8.0	8.2	152.1
Average snowy days	0.2	0	0	0	0	0	0	0	0	0	0	0.1	0.3
Average relative humidity (%)	74	75	79	78	79	83	82	80	76	73	72	69	77
Mean monthly sunshine hours	57.3	52.6	49.9	86.2	126.5	128.1	173.7	189.4	176.0	153.8	124.8	106.3	1,424.6
Percentage possible sunshine	17	16	13	23	31	31	42	48	48	43	38	32	32
Source: China Meteorological Administration
