= Xiangzhou County =

Xiangyun 祥云镇
- Town
- Location in Henan
- Coordinates: 34°55′1″N 112°59′27″E
- Country: People's Republic of China
- Province: Henan
- Prefecture-level city: Jiaozuo
- County: Wen County
- Time zone: UTC+8 (China Standard)

Xiangyun (Chinese: 祥云; pinyin: Xiángyún) is a town in Wen County, Henan province, China. As of 2020, it administers the following 28 villages:

- Xiangyun Village
- Dongnanwang Village (东南王村)
- Dashang Village (大尚村)
- Xihe Village (喜合村)
- Zhangsi Village (张寺村)
- Zuoli Village (作礼村)
- Xuezhao Village (薛召村)
- Wangzhao Village (王召村)
- Guanzhao Village (关召村)
- Chaozhao Village (晁召村)
- Liushang Village (留尚村)
- Guxian Village (古贤村)
- Xiazhuang Village (夏庄村)
- Luopodi Village (罗坡底村)
- Suzhuang Village (苏庄村)
- Yanzhuang Village (闫庄村)
- Zhaoma Village (赵马村)
- Wuzhang Village (吴丈村)
- Dayulan Village (大玉兰村)
- Nanjia Village (南贾村)
- Beijia Village (北贾村)
- Lizhao Village (李召村)
- Taikang Village (太康村)
- Wangyangdian Village (王羊店村)
- Xigou Village (西沟村)
- Wangfen Village (王坟村)
- Shiqu Village (石渠村)
- Peilingxin Village (裴岭新村)
