= Tiandong North railway station =

Railway station in Baise, China

Tiandong North 田东北
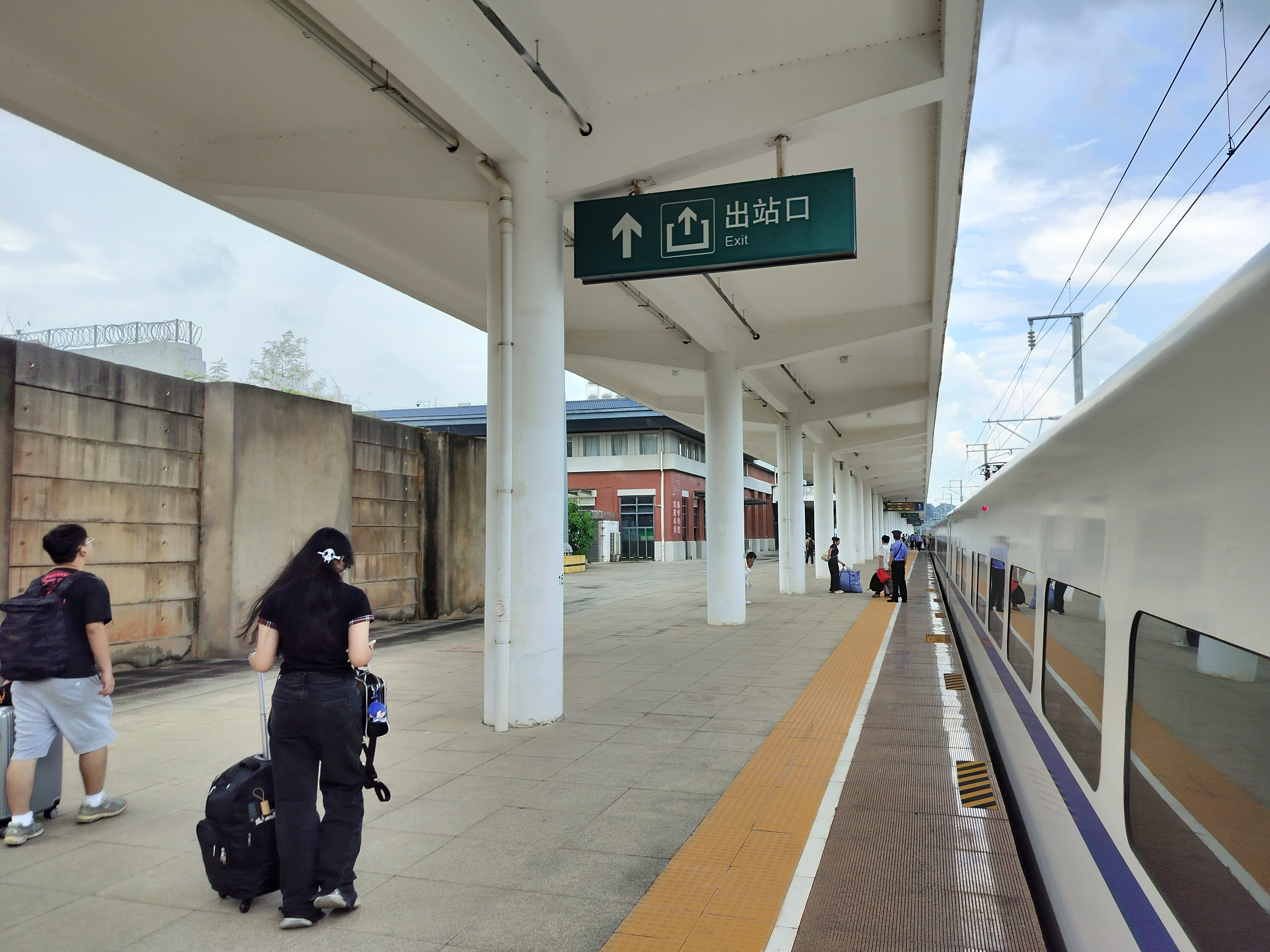

General information
- Location: Tiandong County, Baise, Guangxi; China
- Coordinates: 23.6857°N 107.1378°E
- Line: Nanning–Kunming high-speed railway

Other information
- Station code: TMIS code: 48710; Telegraph code: TBZ; Pinyin code: TDB

History
- Opened: 11 December 2015

Services
Preceding station	China Railway High-speed	Following station
Pingguo towards Nanning	Nanning–Kunming railway	Tianyang towards Kunming
Location

Tiandong North is a railway station in Tiandong County, Baise, Guangxi, China. It was built in 2015 and opened on 11 December that year as part of the Nanning–Baise section of the Nanning–Kunming high-speed railway. It is the newer of the two railway stations in Tiandong County, the other being Tiandong railway station.
