= Tianyang railway station =

Chinese high-speed train station in Guangxi

Tianyang 田阳
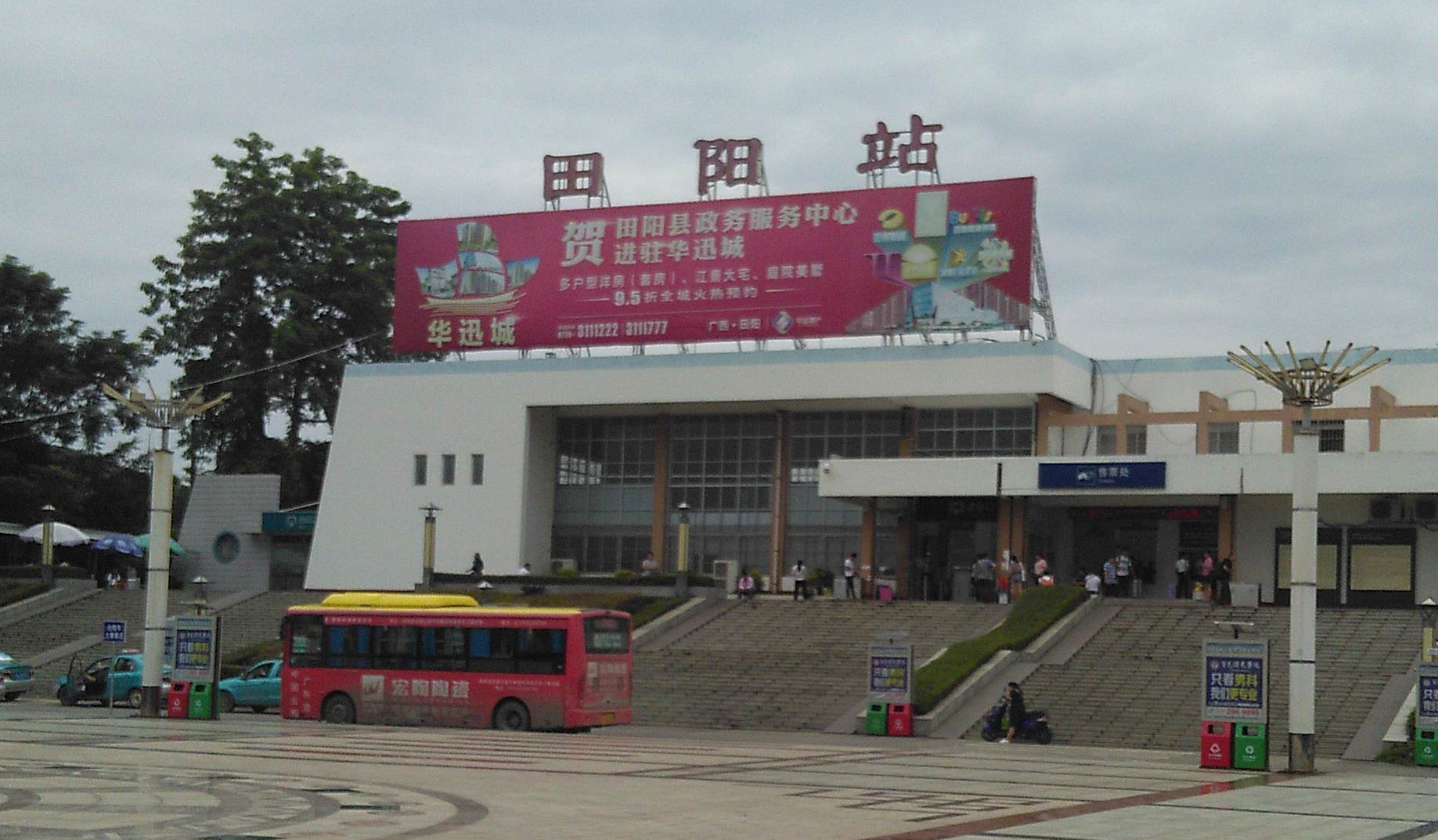

General information
- Location: Tianyang District, Baise, Guangxi; China
- Coordinates: 23.7688°N 106.9324°E

History
- Opened: 2 December 1997

Services
Preceding station	China Railway High-speed	Following station
Tiandong North towards Nanning	Nanning–Kunming railway	Baise towards Kunming
Location

Tianyang railway station is the main railway station in Tianyang District, Baise, Guangxi, China that formally became part of the Nanning–Baise section of the Nanning–Kunming high-speed railway on 11 December 2015. It was originally built as part of the Nanning–Kunming railway. It was opened shortly after the formal opening of the railway in 1997.

== Specifications ==
The station and its grounds occupy 284,786 m^{2} (3,065,410 sq ft), and the original construction included a maximum capacity for 300 people at one time in the traveller buildings and 500 m (1,600 ft) a long main side and an island platforms servicing 3 of the 4 tracks.
