= Tiandong–Debao railway =

Railway line in China

Overview
- Native name: 田德铁路
- Status: Operational
- Termini: Tiandong; Debao
- Stations: 3 (1 passenger)

Service
- Type: Heavy rail

History
- Opened: June 23, 2010 (freight); 29 January 2016 (passengers)

Technical
- Line length: 72.6 km (45 mi)
- Track gauge: 1,435 mm (4 ft 8 1/2 in) standard gauge
- Electrification: 50 Hz 25,000 V
- Operating speed: 120 km/h (75 mph)

The Tiandong–Debao railway (Chinese: 田德铁路) is a railway line in Baise, Guangxi, China. The single-track line is 72.6 kilometres (45.1 mi) long. At its northern end, the line connects with the Nanning–Kunming railway. At its southern end, it connects with the Debao–Jingxi railway. The only station on the line that is open to passengers is Debao railway station.

== History ==
The line opened on 23 July 2010. Passenger services were introduced on 29 January 2016.
