= Longjing Subdistrict =

Subdistrict in China

Longjing Subdistrict (Chinese: 龙景街道) is a subdistrict of Youjiang District, Baise, Guangxi, China, before June 21, 2005, called Nabi Township (Chinese: 那毕乡), and locally known as Mbanx Nazbit which means Duck Field Village.

== Demographics ==
Longjing Subdistrict's population was 49,000 (2010). 80% of the people belong to the Zhuang ethnic group, and speak Youjiang Zhuang (Gangjdoj). Others include Han who speak Pinghua.
