= Wenshan Tram =

Tram system in China

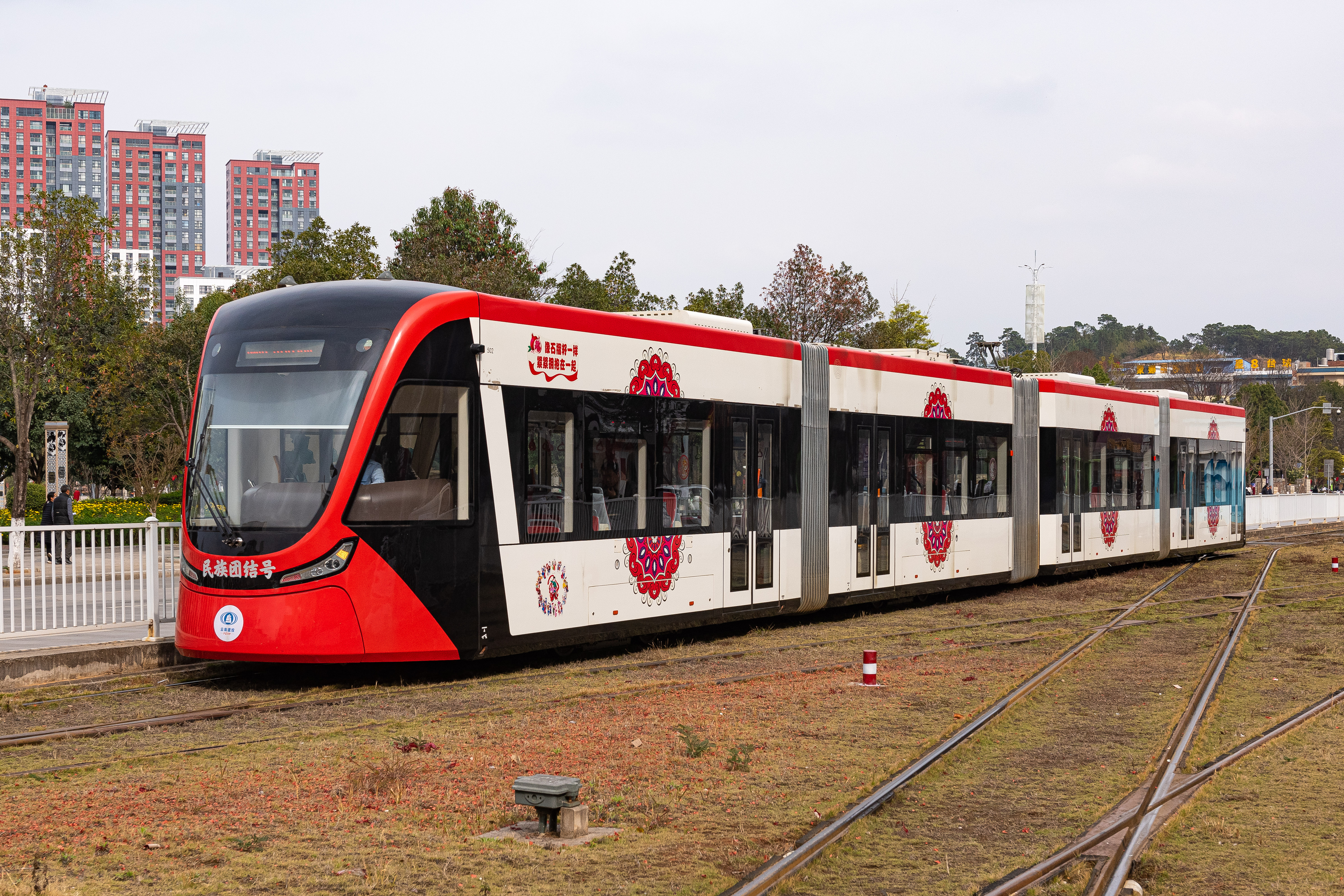
- Wenshan Tram Line 4 at Jiaolian Plaza

Operation
- Open: May 15, 2021; 4 years ago

Infrastructure
- Track gauge: 1,435 mm (4 ft 8 1/2 in)
- Electrification: Battery and supercapacitor powered, overhead line at stops only

Statistics
- Route length: 13.96 km (9 mi)
- Stops: 11

Wenshan Tram is a tram system serving Qiubei County, Wenshan Prefecture, Yunnan, China.

== Lines in operation ==
=== Line 4 ===
Line 4 consists of a main line with 8 stops and branch line with 3 stops. Most of the route is grade separated. The trams are powered through a combination of batteries and supercapacitors, which negates the need for continuous overhead line outside of halts. The rolling stock consists of 15 low-floor trams built by CRRC Zhuzhou. The network opened on 15 May 2021.

In 2023 it had the second lowest passenger numbers of all trams in China (save for the Honghe Tram), with 1,372 passengers daily.

== Route ==
The tram connects the urban center of Qiubei and the Puzhehei Tourist Service Center to Puzhehei railway station on the Nanning–Kunming high-speed railway.
