= Nanning West railway station =

Railway station in Nanning, Guangxi

Nanning West 南宁西

General information
- Location: Xixiangtang District, Nanning, Guangxi; China
- Coordinates: 22°53′26.79″N 107°58′15.26″E
- Line(s): Nanning–Kunming high-speed railway

History
- Opened: 15 May 2016

Nanning West railway station (Chinese: 南宁西站) was a railway station in Xixiangtang District, Nanning, Guangxi, China. The station is an intermediate stop on the Nanning–Kunming high-speed railway. The station has two side platforms.

== History ==
The station was initially called Tanluo (Chinese: 坛洛站), but was renamed prior to opening. The station was opened on the first stage of the Nanning–Kunming high-speed railway on 15 May 2016. The initial service was two trains in each direction per day.

Preceding station	China Railway High-speed	Following station
Nanning Terminus	Nanning–Kunming railway	Long'an East towards Kunming
