= Puzhehei railway station =

Railway station in Wenshan Zhuang and Miao Autonomous Prefecture, Yunnan

Puzhehei 普者黑
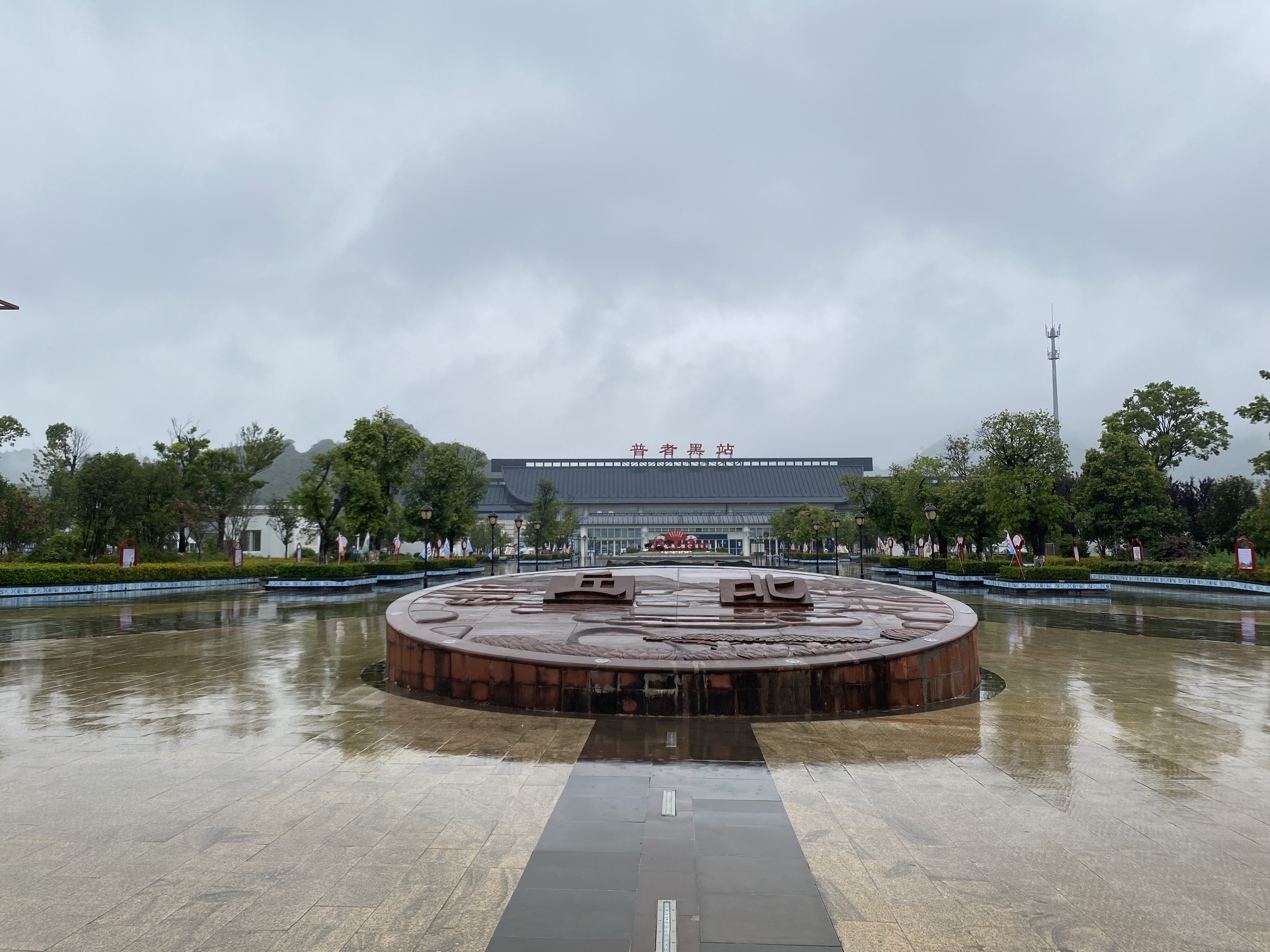
- Puzhehei railway station in 2023

General information
- Location: Qiubei County, Wenshan Zhuang and Miao Autonomous Prefecture, Yunnan; China
- Coordinates: 23°58′16.59″N 104°10′38.10″E
- Line: Nanning–Kunming high-speed railway

History
- Opened: 28 December 2016
Location

Puzhehei railway station (Chinese: 普者黑站; pinyin: Pǔzhěhēi zhàn) is a railway station in Qiubei County, Wenshan Zhuang and Miao Autonomous Prefecture, Yunnan, China. It opened on 28 December 2016. The station is situated at the terminus of Line 4 of Wenshan Tram.

Preceding station	China Railway High-speed	Following station
Mile towards Nanning	Nanning–Kunming railway	Zhulin towards Kunming
