= Sicheng, Lingyun County =

Sicheng 泗城镇
- Town
- Location within Guangxi
- Coordinates: 24°20′48″N 106°34′04″E
- Country: People's Republic of China
- Autonomous region: Guangxi
- Prefecture-level city: Baise
- County: Lingyun
- Time zone: UTC+8 (China Standard)

Sicheng is a town in and the seat of Lingyun County, in the west of Guangxi, China.
