= Debao County =

Debao 德保县 · Dwzbauj Yen
- County
- Location of the seat in Guangxi
- Coordinates: 23.323°N 106.615°E
- Country: China
- Autonomous region: Guangxi
- Prefecture-level city: Baise
- Township-level divisions: 7 towns 5 townships
- County seat: Chengguan

Area
  - Total: 2,575 km^{2} (994 sq mi)
- Elevation: 643 m (2,110 ft)

Population (2010)
  - Total: 350,800
  - Density: 136.2/km^{2} (352.8/sq mi)
- Time zone: UTC+8 (China Standard)
- Postal code: 533700

Debao (simplified Chinese: 德保县; traditional Chinese: 德保縣; pinyin: Débǎo Xiàn, zhuang: Dwzbauj Yen) is a county of western Guangxi, China. It is under the administration of Baise City.

== Economy ==
Bauxite mining is a major industry in Debao County. To facilitate the transportation of the ore, a 72-km single-track electrified railway branch was completed in 2010, connecting Debao with Tiandong on the Nanning–Kunming mainline. The bauxite and other local ores are shipped by rail to Qianxinan in Guizhou, Shihezi in Xinjiang, and to other metallurgical plants throughout the country. In the opposite direction, coal is brought to Debao from Guizhou, Shanxi, and from overseas (via the Fangchenggang port).

There are also plans to extend this new railway further southwest from Debao, to the Longbang border crossing (Jingxi County) on the Vietnamese border.

== Administrative divisions ==
There are 7 towns and 5 townships in the county:

Towns:

- Chengguan (城关镇), Longsang (隆桑镇), Jingde (敬德镇), Zurong (足荣镇), Ma'ai (马隘镇), Dongling (东凌镇), Najia (那甲镇)

Townships:

- Du'an Township (都安乡), Ronghua Township (荣华乡), Yandong Township (燕峒乡), Longguang Township (龙光乡), Batou Township (巴头乡)

== Climate ==
Climate data for Debao, elevation 680 m (2,230 ft), (1991–2020 normals, extremes 1981–present)
Month	Jan	Feb	Mar	Apr	May	Jun	Jul	Aug	Sep	Oct	Nov	Dec	Year
Record high °C (°F)	28.5 (83.3)	32.8 (91.0)	34.0 (93.2)	36.5 (97.7)	37.2 (99.0)	35.4 (95.7)	35.6 (96.1)	35.5 (95.9)	34.8 (94.6)	33.3 (91.9)	29.9 (85.8)	29.2 (84.6)	37.2 (99.0)
Mean daily maximum °C (°F)	15.7 (60.3)	18.3 (64.9)	21.6 (70.9)	26.1 (79.0)	28.6 (83.5)	29.9 (85.8)	30.2 (86.4)	30.2 (86.4)	28.7 (83.7)	25.5 (77.9)	22.1 (71.8)	17.7 (63.9)	24.5 (76.2)
Daily mean °C (°F)	11.6 (52.9)	13.9 (57.0)	17.1 (62.8)	21.4 (70.5)	24.0 (75.2)	25.5 (77.9)	25.7 (78.3)	25.3 (77.5)	23.6 (74.5)	20.5 (68.9)	16.9 (62.4)	12.7 (54.9)	19.8 (67.7)
Mean daily minimum °C (°F)	8.9 (48.0)	10.9 (51.6)	14.1 (57.4)	18.1 (64.6)	20.7 (69.3)	22.6 (72.7)	22.8 (73.0)	22.2 (72.0)	20.4 (68.7)	17.4 (63.3)	13.5 (56.3)	9.5 (49.1)	16.8 (62.2)
Record low °C (°F)	−0.8 (30.6)	0.1 (32.2)	2.0 (35.6)	7.5 (45.5)	11.9 (53.4)	15.0 (59.0)	16.9 (62.4)	18.4 (65.1)	13.5 (56.3)	7.5 (45.5)	2.4 (36.3)	−2.6 (27.3)	−2.6 (27.3)
Average precipitation mm (inches)	38.9 (1.53)	25.4 (1.00)	46.5 (1.83)	60.9 (2.40)	172.6 (6.80)	254.5 (10.02)	274.3 (10.80)	248.2 (9.77)	151.7 (5.97)	96.5 (3.80)	51.0 (2.01)	33.7 (1.33)	1,454.2 (57.26)
Average precipitation days (≥ 0.1 mm)	12.2	10.7	12.5	12.2	15.5	18.6	20.4	18.2	12.5	9.8	8.6	8.5	159.7
Average snowy days	0.3	0	0	0	0	0	0	0	0	0	0	0	0.3
Average relative humidity (%)	79	77	78	76	77	81	82	83	81	79	78	77	79
Mean monthly sunshine hours	68.4	76.7	86.7	117.9	136.7	113.4	137.1	153.0	141.8	120.5	119.3	103.7	1,375.2
Percentage possible sunshine	20	24	23	31	33	28	33	39	39	34	36	31	31
Source: China Meteorological Administration all-time October record

== Transportation ==
The county has one railway station, Debao railway station.
