= Debao–Jingxi railway =

Railway line in China

Overview
- Native name: 德靖铁路
- Status: Operational
- Termini: Debao; Jingxi
- Stations: 3 (2 passenger)

Service
- Type: Heavy rail

History
- Opened: May 18, 2013 (freight); 29 January 2016 (passengers)

Technical
- Line length: 39.9 km (25 mi)
- Track gauge: 1,435 mm (4 ft 8 1/2 in) standard gauge
- Electrification: 50 Hz 25,000 V
- Operating speed: 120 km/h (75 mph)

The Debao–Jingxi railway (Chinese: 德靖铁路) is a railway line in Baise, Guangxi, China. The single-track line is 39.9 kilometres (24.8 mi) long and has a speed limit of 120 kilometres per hour (75 mph). At its northern end, the line connects with the Tiandong–Debao railway.

== History ==
The line opened for freight services on 18 May 2013. Passenger services were introduced on 29 January 2016.
