= Baise railway station =

Railway station in Baise, China

Baise 百色
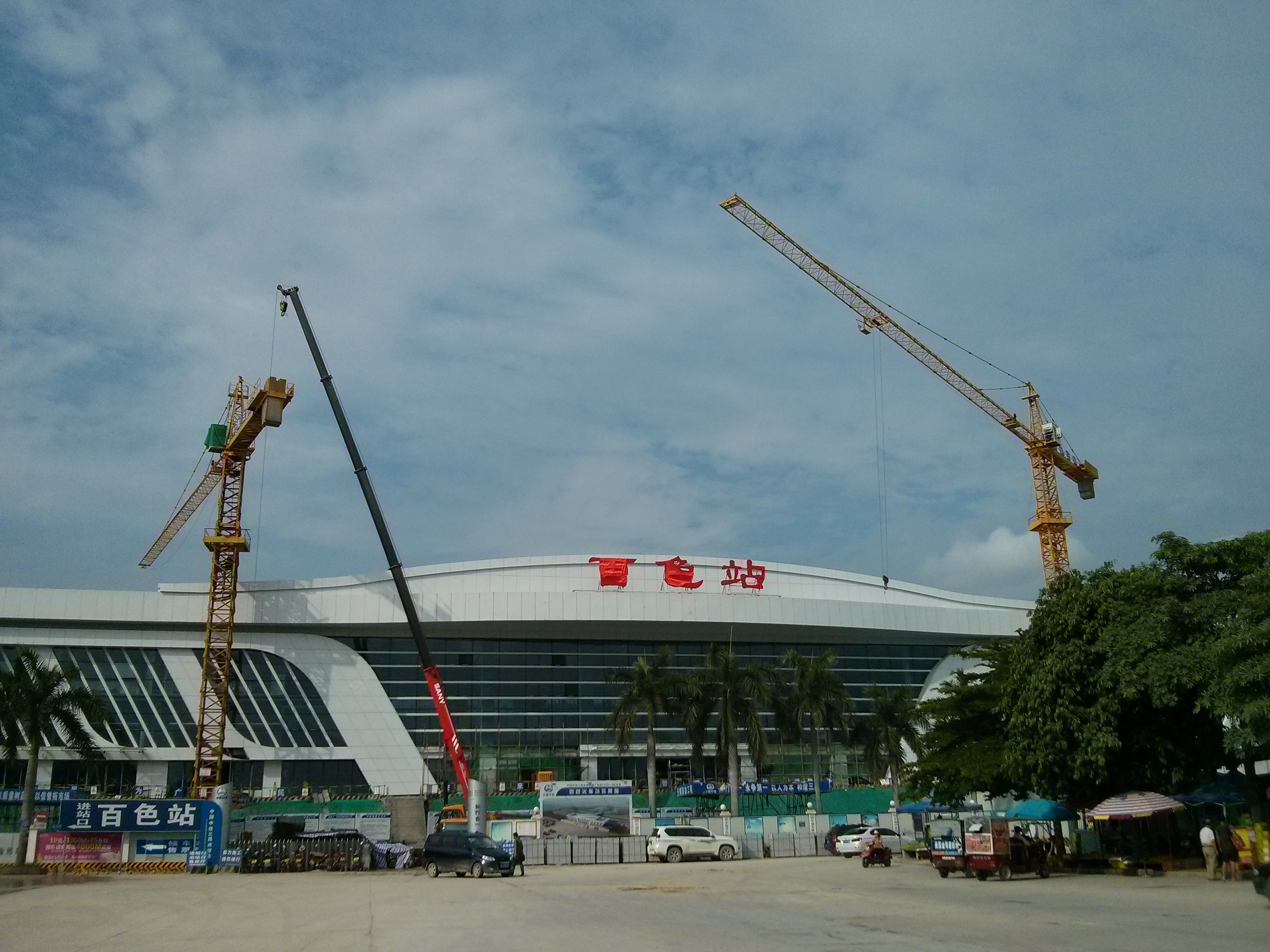
- The station during reconstruction in 2015

General information
- Location: Youjiang District, Baise, Guangxi; China
- Coordinates: 23.8881°N 106.6607°E
- Lines: Nanning–Kunming railway Nanning–Kunming high-speed railway
Location

Baise railway station (Chinese: 百色站) is a railway station located in Youjiang District, Baise, Guangxi, China.

== History ==
The station was rebuilt in 2015. High-speed services began serving Baise on 11 December 2015 with the opening of the first phase of the Nanning–Kunming high-speed railway between Baise and Nanning.

Preceding station	China Railway	Following station
Tianyang towards Nanning	Nanning–Kunming railway	Tianlin towards Kunming
Preceding station	China Railway High-speed	Following station
Tianyang towards Nanning	Nanning–Kunming railway	Funing towards Kunming
