= Guoyuan =

- Simplified Chinese: 果园
- Traditional Chinese: 果園
Transcriptions
Standard Mandarin
- Hanyu Pinyin: Guǒyuán
- Wade–Giles: Kuoyuan

Guoyuan (simplified Chinese: 果园; traditional Chinese: 果園; pinyin: Guǒyuán) means orchard in Chinese, may refer to:

- orchard
- Guoyuan, Changsha, Hunan, China
- Guoyuan station, Beijing, China
- Guoyuan Subdistrict, Beijing, China
- Guoyuan township, Jiuquan, a township in Jiuquan, Gansu Province, China
- Guoyuan township, Tangshan, a township in Tangshan, Hebei Province, China
- Guoyuan township, Dongxiang Autonomous County, a township in Linxia Hui Autonomous Prefecture, Gansu Province, China
- Pingguoyuan (disambiguation), various geo name. Itself means apple orchard.
