= Jingde =

Jingde may refer to:

- Jingde County (旌德县), Xuancheng, Anhui, China
- Jingde, Guangxi (敬德镇), town in Debao County, Guangxi, China
- Jingde (景德; 1004–1007), era name of Emperor Zhenzong of the Song dynasty

== See also ==
- Jingdezhen (景德镇市), prefecture-level city of Jiangxi, China
