= Sicheng =

Sìchéng (泗城) may refer to the following places in China:

- Sicheng, Anhui, in Si County
- Sicheng, Lingyun County, Guangxi
