= Debao railway station =

Railway station in Baise, Guangxi

Debao 德保

General information
- Location: Debao County, Baise, Guangxi; China
- Coordinates: 23.3482°N 106.6245°E
- Line(s): Tiandong–Debao railway; Debao–Jingxi railway

History
- Opened: 23 June 2010 (freight); 29 January 2016 (passengers)

Debao railway station (Chinese: 德保) is a railway station in Debao County, Baise, Guangxi, China.

== History ==
Freight service began on 23 July 2010 with the opening of the Tiandong–Debao railway. Passenger services were introduced on 29 January 2016. The initial service level was four trains per day to Jingxi and four trains per day to Nanning.
