= Haicheng Township, Guangxi =

Haicheng Township 海城乡
- Township
- Location in Guangxi
- Coordinates: 23°39′11″N 107°29′56″E
- Country: People's Republic of China
- Autonomous region: Guangxi
- Prefecture-level city: Baise
- County-level city: Pingguo
- Time zone: UTC+8 (China Standard)

Haicheng Township (simplified Chinese: 海城乡; traditional Chinese: 海城鄉; pinyin: Hǎichéng Xiāng) is a township under the administration of Pingguo, Guangxi, China. As of 2020, it has 16 villages under its administration.

- Nahai Village (那海村)
- Guiliang Village (贵良村)
- Rongfang Village (荣方村)
- Shizhao Village (石赵村)
- Fushan Village (伏山村)
- Baitan Village (百谭村)
- Gaole Village (高乐村)
- Xingji Village (行吉村)
- Xinmin Village (新民村)
- Dingti Village (定提村)
- Yongliang Village (拥良村)
- Yongqi Village (拥齐村)
- Wankang Village (万康村)
- Liuzuo Village (六作村)
- Xionglie Village (雄烈村)
- Xiongxing Village (雄兴村)
