= Nanning–Kunming high-speed railway =

Railway line in China

Nanning–Kunming high-speed railway 南昆客运专线

Overview
- Status: Operating
- Locale: Guangxi and Yunnan
- Termini: Nanning; Kunming South
- Stations: 22

Service
- Type: High-speed rail
- Operator(s): China Railway High-speed

History
- Opened: (Nanning-Baise) December 11, 2015 (Baise-Kunming) December 28, 2016

Technical
- Line length: 709.518 km (441 mi)
- Number of tracks: 2
- Track gauge: 1,435 mm (4 ft 8 1/2 in) standard gauge
- Minimum radius: 4500 m
- Electrification: 50 Hz, 25,000 V
- Operating speed: 250 km/h (155 mph)
- Maximum incline: (Nanning-Baise) 12‰ (Baise-Kunming) 9‰

Nanning–Kunming high-speed railway
- Simplified Chinese: 南昆客运专线
- Traditional Chinese: 南昆客運專線
Transcriptions
Standard Mandarin
- Hanyu Pinyin: Nán Kūn Kèyùn Zhuānxiàn

Nanning–Kunming high-speed railway (formerly known as the Yunnan–Guangxi high-speed railway) is a high-speed railway connecting Nanning and Kunming, respectively the capitals of the Guangxi Zhuang Autonomous Region and Yunnan Province. It has a total length of 715.8 km (444.8 mi) of electrified double-track railway, built to the Grade 1 standard. Positioned as part of China's "long-term railway network plan", to improve the layout and the development of South-Western China with critical infrastructure, it was Yunnan Province's first high-speed transport corridor to the sea. With future Pan-Asian railways to Laos, Thailand and Vietnam planned or under construction, this railway will be seen as a crucial link between the economic powerhouse of the Pearl River Delta Economic Zone and Indochina under the One Belt-One Road initiative.

== History ==
- December 27, 2009 – Construction of the Nanning–Kunming high-speed railway started.
- June 20, 2011 – Xiaotuanshan tunnel breakthrough.
- October 2015 – Phase 1 from Nanning to Baise completed construction and testing began.
- December 11, 2015 – Phase 1 opened and operations from Nanning to Baise section commenced, with CRH2A trains.
- December 28, 2016, Phase 2 opened and operations from Baise to Kunming section commenced.

== Route ==
Construction started on December 27, 2009, with the first phase from Nanning to Baise opening on December 11, 2015. It saw 17 new stations constructed, with three more stations being renovated. Bridges and tunnels account for total length of 500 kilometres (310 mi). Built with a total investment of nearly 90 billion RMB, it was expected that the construction period would have a duration of six years. Total length of the project was 709.518 km (440.874 mi), of which 274.83 km (170.77 mi) was in Guangxi Zhuang Autonomous Region, and 432.183 km (268.546 mi) within Yunnan Province.

Starting at Nanning's Xixiangtang District the railway travels north-west through Long'an County to Baise's Pingguo County, Tiandong County and Tianyang County before reaching Baise urban Youjiang District itself. After this, the second phase of the route goes westward across Youjiang District into Yunnan Province's Funing County, Guangnan County and Qiubei County in Wenshan. Turning north-west again, the line crosses Mile City in Honghe. Now progressing northwards, the line enters Kunming's Shilin Yi Autonomous County before cutting across Yuxi's Chengjiang County before re-entering Kunming through Yiliang County. Chenggong District and terminating in the Guandu District.

=== Nanning–Baise section ===
- Railroad Grade: I level
- The number of main lines: Double
- Limiting gradient: 12‰
- Maximum speed: 250 km/h
- Minimum curve radius: Usually 5500 m, 4500 m difficult regions
- Type of traction: Electrical
- Rolling Stock: EMU
- Traction Quality: 4000 t
- Effective platform length: 650 m
- Block Type: Automatic Block

=== Baise–Kunming section ===
- Railroad Grade: I level
- The number of main lines: Double
- Limiting gradient: Baise to Kunming 9‰, afterburner slope 18.5‰; Kunming South to Shilin Banqiao partial 23.5‰
- Maximum speed: 200 km/h (reserved 250 km/h)
- Minimum curve radius: Usually 5500 m, 4500 m difficult regions
- Type of traction: Electrical
- Rolling Stock: EMU
- Traction Quality: 4000 t
- Effective platform length: Baise to Shilin Banqiao 880 m, 650 m Shilin Banqiao to Kunming South
- Block Type: Automatic Block

== Stations ==
Kunming South, Jingkai, Yangzong, Shilin West, Mile, Xinshao, Hongshiyan, Puzhehei, Zhulin, Guangnan, Bailazhai, Funing, Bo'ai, Yangwei, Baise, Tianyang, Tiandong North, Pingguo, Long'an East, Nanning West and Nanning
