= Pingguo =

Pingguo 平果市 · Bingzgoj Si
- County-level city
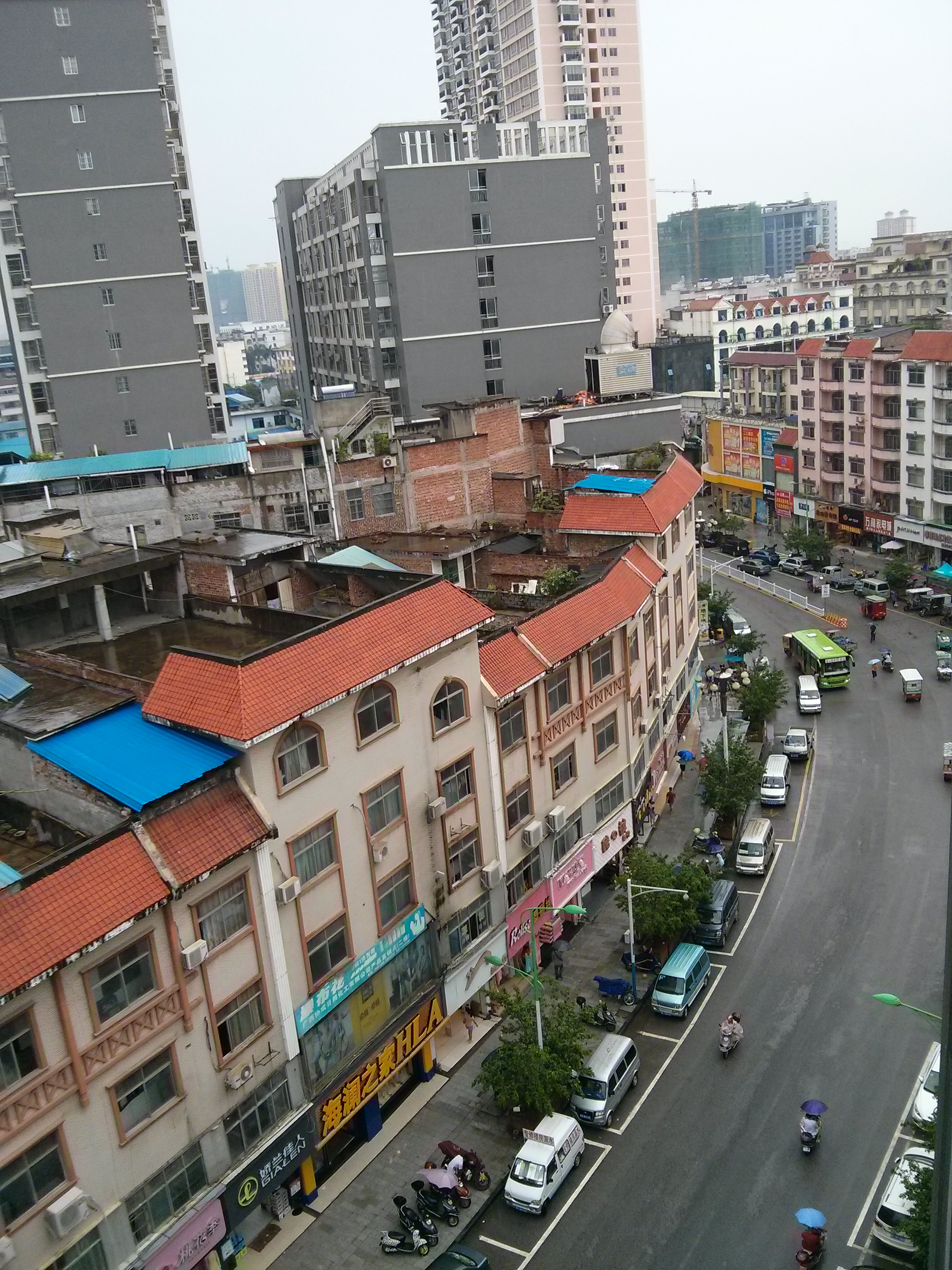

- Location within Guangxi
- Coordinates: 23°19′44″N 107°35′24″E
- Country: China
- Region: Guangxi
- Prefecture-level city: Baise
- Township-level divisions: 9 towns 3 townships
- Municipal seat: Matou (马头镇)

Area
  - County-level city: 2,485 km^{2} (959 sq mi)
  - Urban: 33.1 km^{2} (12.8 sq mi)
- Elevation: 109 m (358 ft)

Population (2020)
  - County-level city: 455,643
  - Density: 183.4/km^{2} (474.9/sq mi)
  - Urban: 277,500
- Time zone: China Standard
- Postal code: 531400
- Website: http://www.pingguo.gov.cn/##

Pingguo (Chinese: 平果市; pinyin: Píngguǒ shì; Zhuang: Bingzgoj Si) is a city of west-central Guangxi, China. It is the easternmost county-level division of the prefecture-level city of Baise. Two thirds of the population are Zhuang.

It was formed in 2019 when Pingguo County was upgraded to the county-level city Pingguo. Pingguo County was formed in 1952 as a merger of Pingzhi and Guode County. Guode County was formed by the merger of Guohua Town and Guide Town which have been recorded as towns during the Song Dynasty and were part of Tianzhou, present day Tianyang District.

The Pingguo Industry Park hosts an important part of China's aluminum industry. 17% of China's proven bauxite reserves are found in Pingguo.

Since 2009, an ITF international tennis tournament has been held annually in Pingguo.

== Administrative divisions ==
There are nine towns and three townships in the city:

Towns:

- Matou (马头镇), Xin'an (新安镇), Guohua (果化镇), Taiping (太平镇), Pozao (坡造镇), Sitang (四塘镇), Jiucheng (旧城镇), Bangxu (榜圩镇), Fengwu Town (风梧镇)

Townships:

- Haicheng Township (海城乡), Liming Township (黎明乡), Tonglao Township (同老乡)

== Climate ==
Climate data for Pingguo, elevation 146 m (479 ft), (1991−2020 normals, extremes 1981–present)
Month	Jan	Feb	Mar	Apr	May	Jun	Jul	Aug	Sep	Oct	Nov	Dec	Year
Record high °C (°F)	30.0 (86.0)	35.2 (95.4)	36.9 (98.4)	39.5 (103.1)	40.1 (104.2)	38.5 (101.3)	39.1 (102.4)	38.8 (101.8)	38.4 (101.1)	36.2 (97.2)	33.8 (92.8)	31.5 (88.7)	40.1 (104.2)
Mean daily maximum °C (°F)	17.2 (63.0)	19.5 (67.1)	22.3 (72.1)	27.8 (82.0)	31.1 (88.0)	32.6 (90.7)	33.3 (91.9)	33.4 (92.1)	32.1 (89.8)	28.9 (84.0)	24.7 (76.5)	19.9 (67.8)	26.9 (80.4)
Daily mean °C (°F)	13.3 (55.9)	15.5 (59.9)	18.4 (65.1)	23.3 (73.9)	26.4 (79.5)	28.0 (82.4)	28.6 (83.5)	28.4 (83.1)	27.0 (80.6)	23.7 (74.7)	19.5 (67.1)	15.0 (59.0)	22.3 (72.1)
Mean daily minimum °C (°F)	10.7 (51.3)	12.7 (54.9)	15.8 (60.4)	20.2 (68.4)	23.2 (73.8)	25.1 (77.2)	25.5 (77.9)	25.2 (77.4)	23.6 (74.5)	20.3 (68.5)	16.0 (60.8)	11.7 (53.1)	19.2 (66.5)
Record low °C (°F)	0.0 (32.0)	1.8 (35.2)	3.0 (37.4)	9.8 (49.6)	13.7 (56.7)	16.6 (61.9)	20.4 (68.7)	21.6 (70.9)	16.2 (61.2)	8.8 (47.8)	3.2 (37.8)	−0.4 (31.3)	−0.4 (31.3)
Average precipitation mm (inches)	44.8 (1.76)	27.9 (1.10)	58.5 (2.30)	68.7 (2.70)	175.2 (6.90)	237.5 (9.35)	244.9 (9.64)	197.8 (7.79)	122.2 (4.81)	66.2 (2.61)	43.3 (1.70)	34.8 (1.37)	1,321.8 (52.03)
Average precipitation days (≥ 0.1 mm)	10.5	10.2	14.3	12.0	13.3	16.2	17.0	14.8	9.6	7.5	7.1	7.5	140
Average snowy days	0.1	0	0	0	0	0	0	0	0	0	0	0	0.1
Average relative humidity (%)	76	76	78	76	77	80	80	80	77	74	75	73	77
Mean monthly sunshine hours	57.6	56.8	54.3	95.0	137.3	136.5	167.0	182.2	168.2	151.1	120.4	102.8	1,429.2
Percentage possible sunshine	17	18	15	25	33	34	41	46	46	42	37	31	32
Source: China Meteorological Administration

all-time October record

== See also ==
- Pingguoyuan (disambiguation)
