= Jingde, Guangxi =

Jingde 敬德镇
- Town
- Location in Guangxi
- Coordinates: 23°25′5″N 106°18′47″E
- Country: People's Republic of China
- Autonomous Region: Guangxi
- Prefecture-level city: Baise
- County: Debao County
- Time zone: UTC+8 (China Standard)

Jingde (Chinese: 敬德; pinyin: Jìngdé) is a town of Debao County, Guangxi, China. As of 2020, it administers the following 20 villages:

- Duojing Village (多敬村)
- Gugan Village (古甘村)
- Linghuai Village (凌怀村)
- Yali Village (雅里村)
- Duojiang Village (多匠村)
- Mudong Village (暮洞村)
- Nanuan Village (那暖村)
- Quyan Village (渠岩村)
- Longdong Village (陇洞村)
- Baning Village (巴宁村)
- Mi'an Village (密安村)
- Duolang Village (多浪村)
- Longzheng Village (陇正村)
- Fuping Village (扶平村)
- Tuoliang Village (驮良村)
- Dahong Village (大红村)
- Tuoxin Village (驮信村)
- Nong'an Village (农安村)
- Zhongli Village (中力村)
- Niangui Village (念归村)
