= Tiandong County =

Tiandong 田东县 · Denzdungh Yen
- County
- Location of the seat in Guangxi
- Coordinates: 23°35′49″N 107°07′34″E
- Country: China
- Autonomous region: Guangxi
- Prefecture-level city: Baise
- County seat: Pingma

Area
  - Total: 2,816 km^{2} (1,087 sq mi)

Population (2020)
  - Total: 352,007
  - Density: 125.0/km^{2} (323.8/sq mi)
- Time zone: UTC+8 (China Standard)
- Postal code: 531500
- Website: http://www.gxtd.gov.cn

Tiandong County (simplified Chinese: 田东县; traditional Chinese: 田東縣; pinyin: Tiándōng Xiàn, Zhuang: Denzdungh Yen) is a county of Guangxi, China. It is under the administration of the prefecture-level city of Baise.

== Demographics ==
Tiandong's population was 411,500 (2010). 85.22% of the people belong to the Zhuang ethnic group, and speak Youjiang Zhuang (Gangjdoj). The rest include Han, Yao, Miao, and other ethnic groups.

== Administrative divisions ==
Currently, for administration Tiandong County is divided into 9 towns and 1 ethnic township:

- Pingma Town (平马镇), population: 103,00 (2005)
- Xiangzhou Town (祥周镇), population: 49,200 (2005)
- Linfeng Town (林逢镇), population: 50,800 (2005)
- Silin Town (思林镇), population: 62,000 (2005)
- Yincha Town (印茶镇), population: 24,700 (2005)
- Shuoliang Town (朔良镇), population: 33,600 (2005)
- Yixu Town (义圩镇)
- Napo Town (那拔镇), population: 16,000 (2005)
- Zuodeng Yao Ethnic Township (作登瑶族乡)

== Transportation ==
Apart from road access including the G80 Guangzhou–Kunming Expressway, the county also has rail access via Tiandong Railway Station and via Tiandong North Railway Station which is part of the Nanning–Kunming high-speed railway network. The nearest air access in via Baise Bama Airport which is in the neighbouring Tianyang County.

== Climate ==
Climate data for Tiandong, elevation 111 m (364 ft), (1991−2020 normals, extremes 1981–2010)
Month	Jan	Feb	Mar	Apr	May	Jun	Jul	Aug	Sep	Oct	Nov	Dec	Year
Record high °C (°F)	32.3 (90.1)	36.9 (98.4)	37.5 (99.5)	40.4 (104.7)	40.0 (104.0)	38.6 (101.5)	38.6 (101.5)	38.9 (102.0)	39.2 (102.6)	35.2 (95.4)	34.3 (93.7)	32.4 (90.3)	40.4 (104.7)
Mean daily maximum °C (°F)	18.0 (64.4)	20.7 (69.3)	23.8 (74.8)	28.9 (84.0)	31.7 (89.1)	32.9 (91.2)	33.7 (92.7)	33.7 (92.7)	32.1 (89.8)	28.7 (83.7)	24.9 (76.8)	20.2 (68.4)	27.4 (81.4)
Daily mean °C (°F)	13.8 (56.8)	16.1 (61.0)	19.3 (66.7)	23.9 (75.0)	26.7 (80.1)	28.1 (82.6)	28.6 (83.5)	28.3 (82.9)	26.7 (80.1)	23.3 (73.9)	19.4 (66.9)	15.1 (59.2)	22.4 (72.4)
Mean daily minimum °C (°F)	11.0 (51.8)	13.2 (55.8)	16.3 (61.3)	20.4 (68.7)	23.1 (73.6)	24.9 (76.8)	25.3 (77.5)	25.0 (77.0)	23.3 (73.9)	20.1 (68.2)	16.0 (60.8)	11.8 (53.2)	19.2 (66.6)
Record low °C (°F)	0.9 (33.6)	3.1 (37.6)	4.1 (39.4)	10.5 (50.9)	14.8 (58.6)	17.8 (64.0)	21.2 (70.2)	21.1 (70.0)	15.9 (60.6)	9.9 (49.8)	4.4 (39.9)	−0.2 (31.6)	−0.2 (31.6)
Average precipitation mm (inches)	33.7 (1.33)	20.2 (0.80)	42.5 (1.67)	65.7 (2.59)	147.9 (5.82)	236.9 (9.33)	197.2 (7.76)	187.6 (7.39)	120.4 (4.74)	86.6 (3.41)	38.9 (1.53)	26.3 (1.04)	1,203.9 (47.41)
Average precipitation days (≥ 0.1 mm)	7.9	7.5	9.5	10.6	12.8	15.2	16.4	14.5	9.9	7.7	6.7	5.9	124.6
Average snowy days	0.2	0	0	0	0	0	0	0	0	0	0	0	0.2
Average relative humidity (%)	76	74	75	74	77	82	81	81	80	80	78	75	78
Mean monthly sunshine hours	72.6	82.7	91.6	130.7	164.0	154.6	187.7	197.5	179.3	151.0	134.4	109.1	1,655.2
Percentage possible sunshine	22	26	25	34	40	38	45	50	49	42	41	33	37
Source: China Meteorological Administration

== Pictures ==
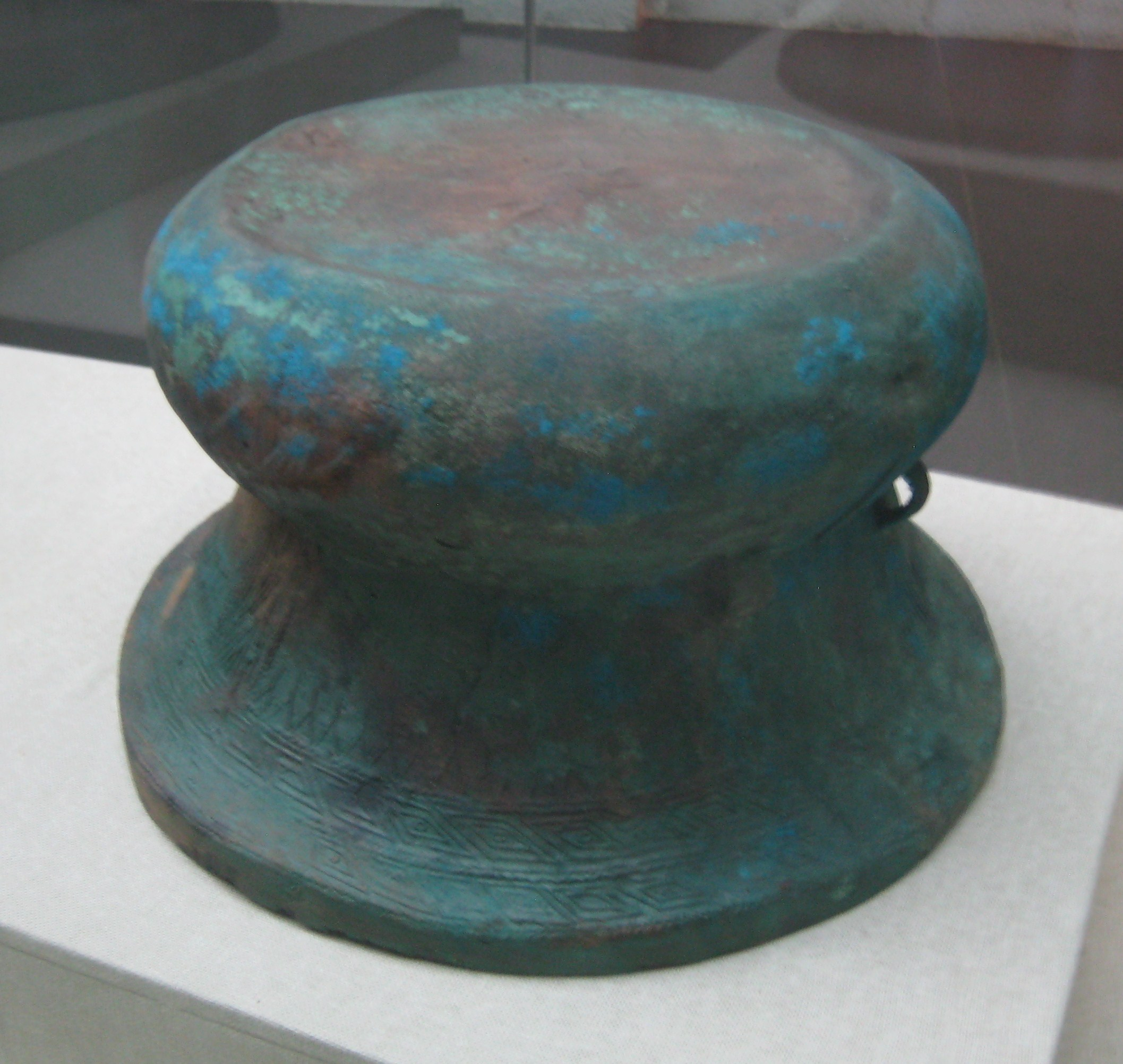
Two thousand year old bronze drum unearthed from Tiandong county, Guangxi, in 1994.
