= Pingguoyuan =

- Simplified Chinese: 苹果园
- Traditional Chinese: 蘋果園
- Literal meaning: apple orchard
Transcriptions
Standard Mandarin
- Hanyu Pinyin: Píngguǒ yuán
- Wade–Giles: P'ingkuo Yuan

Pingguoyuan (simplified Chinese: 苹果园; traditional Chinese: 蘋果園; pinyin: Píngguǒ yuán) may refer to:

- Pingguoyuan Subdistrict, Beijing, a sub-district of Shijingshan District, Beijing, China
  - Pingguoyuan Road, a road named after the area
  - Pingguoyuan station, a subway station named after the area
- Pingguoyuan Subdistrict, Kaifeng, a sub-district of Shunhe Hui District, Kaifeng, China

== See also ==
- Pingguo, (Chinese: 平果) a city in Guangxi, China
- Guoyuan station
- apple orchard, the literal meaning of the noun
