= Baise Bama Airport =

Baise Bama Airport 百色巴马机场
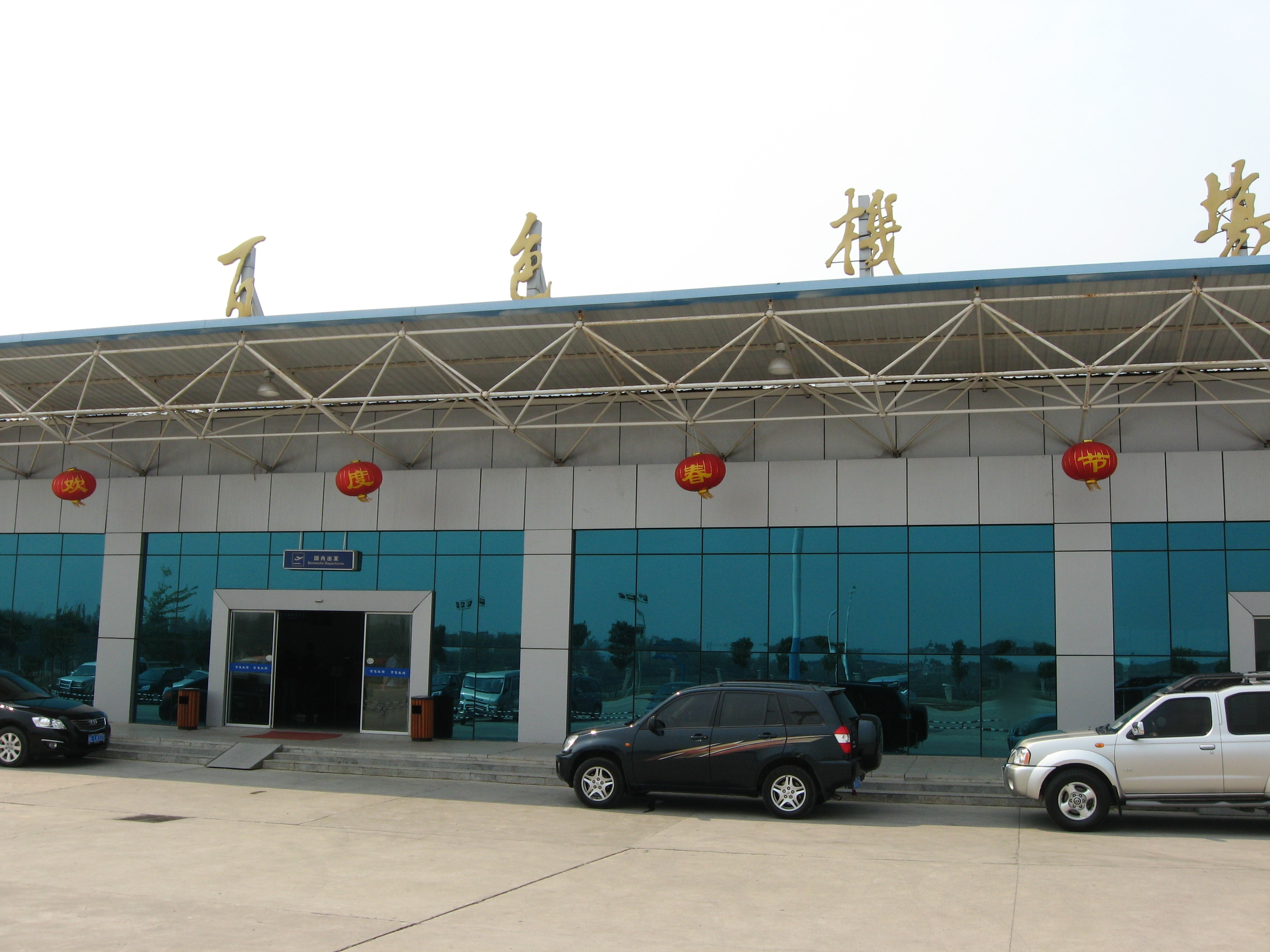
- Baise Airport terminal building
- IATA: AEB; ICAO: ZGBS

Summary
- Airport type: Military/Public
- Operator: Guangxi Airport Group
- Serves: Baise, Guangxi
- Location: Tianyang County, Guangxi
- Elevation AMSL: 45 m (148 ft)
- Coordinates: 23°43′10″N 106°57′33″E
- Website: airport.gx.cn

Map
- Location of airport in Guangxi

Runways
Direction	Length		Surface
Direction	m	ft	Surface
12/30	2,500	8,202	Concrete

Statistics (2021)
- Passengers: 181,080
- Aircraft movements: 2,912
- Cargo (metric tons): 18.5

Baise Bama Airport
- Simplified Chinese: 百色巴马机场
- Traditional Chinese: 百色巴馬機場
Transcriptions
Standard Mandarin
- Hanyu Pinyin: Bǎisè Bāmǎ Jīchǎng

Baise (Bose) Bama Airport (IATA: AEB, ICAO: ZGBS), formerly Baise (Bose) Youjiang Airport, is a dual-use military and civilian airport serving Baise (or Bose) in Guangxi Zhuang Autonomous Region, China. The airport is located in Tianyang County, 48 kilometres (30 mi) from the city center. It was first built in 1965 as the military Tianyang Airport. Expansion of the airport was started in 2005 with an investment of 57 million yuan, and it was reopened as Baise Youjiang Airport in December 2006. On 8 September 2013 it was renamed to Bama Airport.

== Airlines and destinations ==
Airlines	Destinations
China Eastern Airlines	Chongqing, Shanghai–Pudong
China Southern Airlines	Beijing–Daxing, Changsha

== See also ==
- List of airports in China
- List of the busiest airports in China
- List of People's Liberation Army Air Force airbases
