= Youjiang Zhuang =

Language spoken in Tiandong County, China

- Gangjdoj
- Native to: China
- Region: Guangxi
- Native speakers: 870,000 (2007)
- Language family: Kra–Dai: Tai; Northern Tai (Northern Zhuang); Youjiang Zhuang

Language codes
- ISO 639-3: zyj
- Glottolog: youj1238
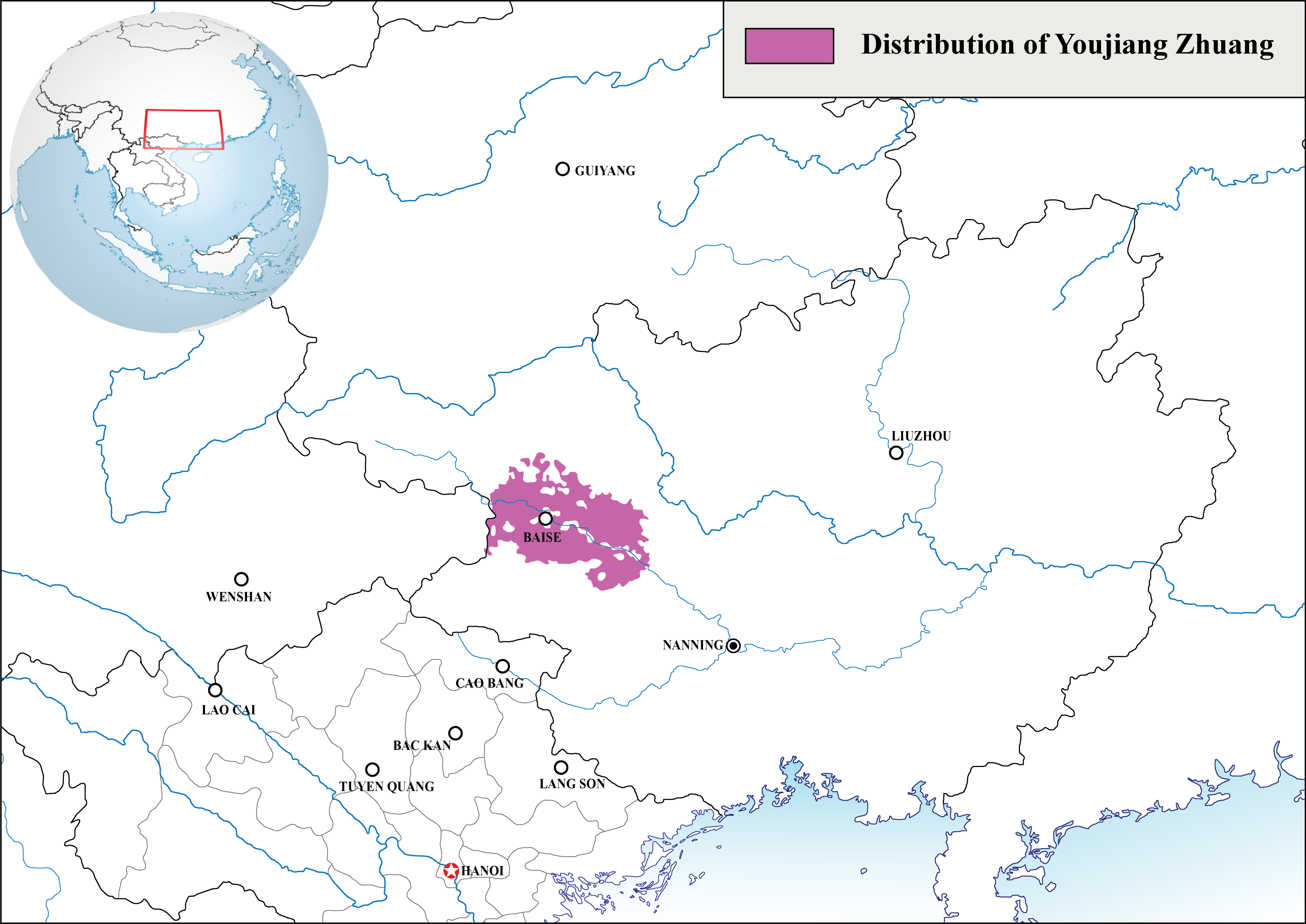
- Geographic distribution of Youjiang Zhuang

Youjiang Zhuang, named after the Youjiang River in Guangxi, China, is a Northern Tai or Zhuang Language spoken in Tiandong County, Tianyang District, and parts of the Youjiang District in Baise, Guangxi.

== History and classification ==
Native speakers refer to the language as Gangjdoj, which means "local language".

André-Georges Haudricourt in 1956 included the language of Tianzhou, the county seat of Tianyang, under Dioi, his name for Northern Zhuang.

Based on data from the 1950s Guangxi Zhuang language survey, Tiandong, Tianyang and a suburb of Baise City were grouped together. This grouping was sometimes called Tianyangese (田阳音系). In the 1999 A Study of Zhuang Dialects this group was referred to as the Youjiang language (右江土语), and in 2007 Youjiang Zhuang was added as a separate language to Ethnologue.

== Phonology ==
Youjiang Zhuang has 10 tones, and can be considered as having 20 initials and 83 finals, though some speakers pronounce the initials /ʔb/ and /ʔd/ as /m/ and /n/ respectively.

== Writing System ==
Youjiang Zhuang has two main writing systems, characters and romanization.
