= Lingyun County =

Lingyun 凌云县
- County
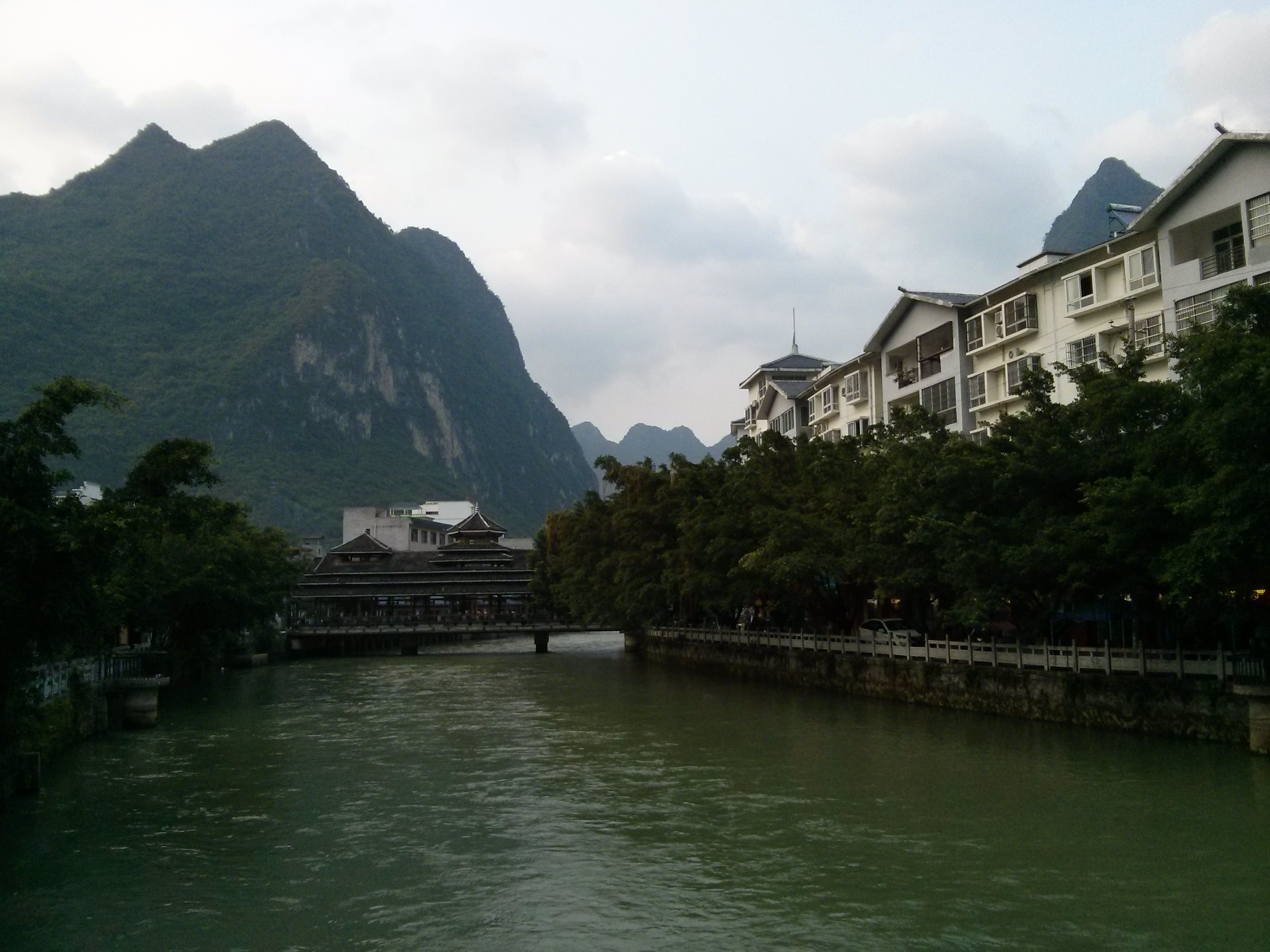

- Location of the seat in Guangxi
- Coordinates: 24°24′N 106°31′E
- Country: China
- Province: Guangxi
- Prefecture-level city: Baise

Area
  - Total: 2,306 km^{2} (890 sq mi)

Population (2020)
  - Total: 188,194
  - Density: 81.61/km^{2} (211.4/sq mi)
- Time zone: UTC+8 (China Standard)
- Postal code: 533100
- Website: http://www.lingyun.gov.cn/

Lingyun County (simplified Chinese: 凌云县; traditional Chinese: 凌雲縣; pinyin: Língyún Xiàn) is a county in the northwest of Guangxi, China. It is under the administration of Baise city.

== Administrative divisions ==
Lingyun County is divided into 4 towns and 4 ethnic townships:

towns

- Sicheng Town 泗城镇
- Luolou Town 逻楼镇
- Jiayou Town 加尤镇
- Xiajia Town 下甲镇

ethnic townships

- Lingzhan Yao Ethnic Township 伶站瑶族乡
- Chaoli Yao Ethnic Township 朝里瑶族乡
- Shali Yao Ethnic Township 沙里瑶族乡
- Yuhong Yao Ethnic Township 玉洪瑶族乡

== Climate ==
Climate data for Lingyun, elevation 438 m (1,437 ft), (1991–2020 normals, extremes 1981–2010)
Month	Jan	Feb	Mar	Apr	May	Jun	Jul	Aug	Sep	Oct	Nov	Dec	Year
Record high °C (°F)	28.7 (83.7)	33.4 (92.1)	35.5 (95.9)	38.9 (102.0)	38.9 (102.0)	36.5 (97.7)	37.5 (99.5)	37.4 (99.3)	37.3 (99.1)	33.6 (92.5)	31.4 (88.5)	29.5 (85.1)	38.9 (102.0)
Mean daily maximum °C (°F)	16.1 (61.0)	19.0 (66.2)	22.7 (72.9)	27.8 (82.0)	30.0 (86.0)	31.2 (88.2)	31.9 (89.4)	32.3 (90.1)	30.5 (86.9)	26.7 (80.1)	22.9 (73.2)	18.3 (64.9)	25.8 (78.4)
Daily mean °C (°F)	12.0 (53.6)	14.4 (57.9)	17.9 (64.2)	22.5 (72.5)	24.9 (76.8)	26.4 (79.5)	26.9 (80.4)	26.6 (79.9)	24.7 (76.5)	21.5 (70.7)	17.5 (63.5)	13.4 (56.1)	20.7 (69.3)
Mean daily minimum °C (°F)	9.4 (48.9)	11.5 (52.7)	14.7 (58.5)	18.8 (65.8)	21.3 (70.3)	23.3 (73.9)	23.8 (74.8)	23.3 (73.9)	21.3 (70.3)	18.3 (64.9)	14.2 (57.6)	10.3 (50.5)	17.5 (63.5)
Record low °C (°F)	−0.3 (31.5)	1.4 (34.5)	2.3 (36.1)	8.8 (47.8)	11.0 (51.8)	15.0 (59.0)	16.9 (62.4)	17.6 (63.7)	11.5 (52.7)	7.6 (45.7)	3.0 (37.4)	−1.6 (29.1)	−1.6 (29.1)
Average precipitation mm (inches)	24.4 (0.96)	19.7 (0.78)	39.2 (1.54)	77.9 (3.07)	231.0 (9.09)	375.8 (14.80)	378.6 (14.91)	289.7 (11.41)	145.6 (5.73)	81.0 (3.19)	43.2 (1.70)	23.2 (0.91)	1,729.3 (68.09)
Average precipitation days (≥ 0.1 mm)	7.3	6.6	9.3	11.2	14.7	18.7	20.1	18.5	11.9	10.1	7.7	5.7	141.8
Average snowy days	0.4	0.1	0	0	0	0	0	0	0	0	0	0.3	0.8
Average relative humidity (%)	73	71	71	71	74	80	82	81	78	77	76	73	76
Mean monthly sunshine hours	55.6	66.8	88.3	117.4	132.4	111.5	140.0	167.1	144.8	109.9	107.1	84.9	1,325.8
Percentage possible sunshine	17	21	24	31	32	27	34	42	40	31	33	26	30
Source: China Meteorological Administration
