= Youjiang District =

Youjiang 右江区 • Yougyangh Gih
- District
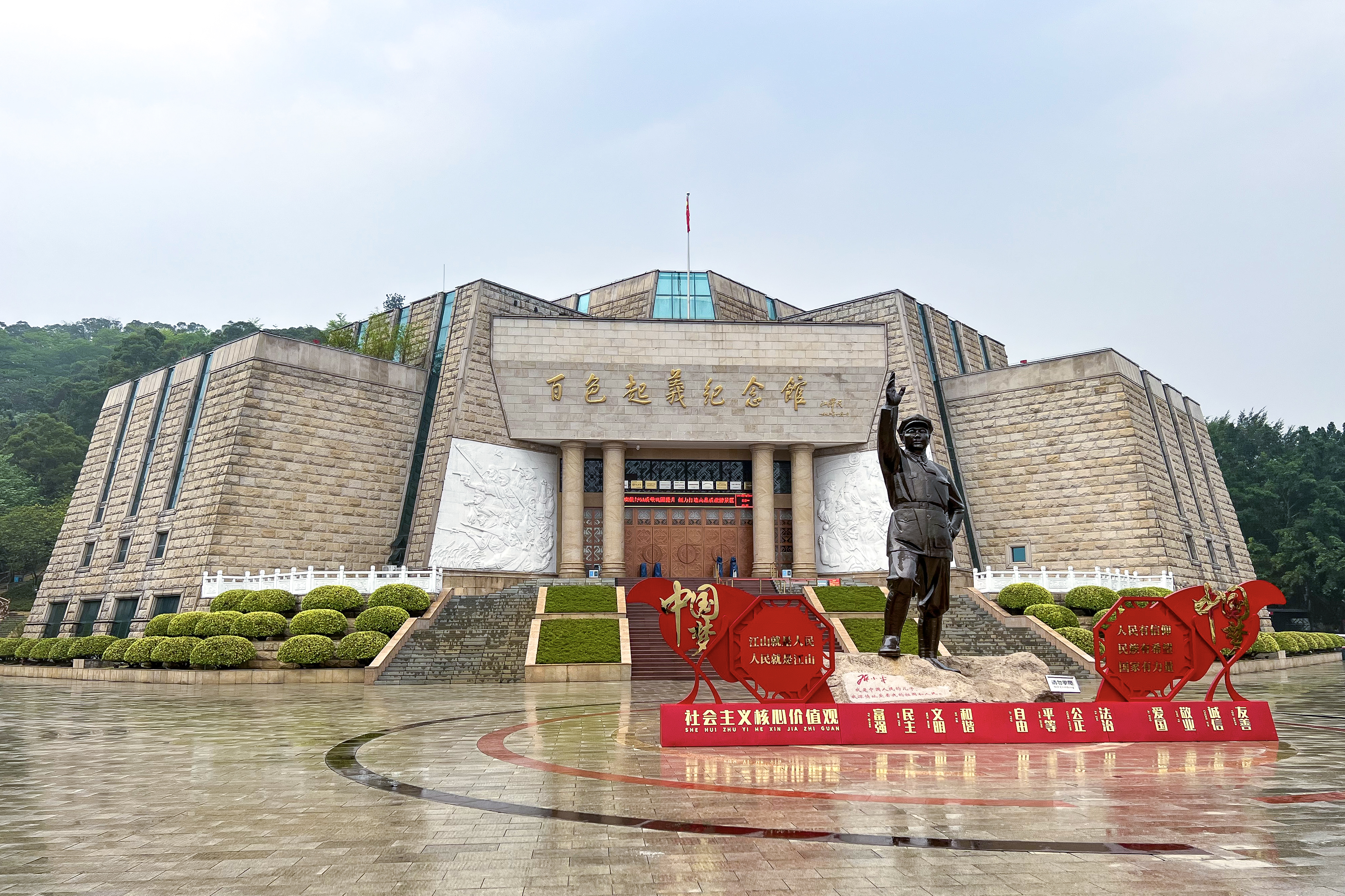
- Baise Uprising Memorial Hall

- Location in Guangxi
- Coordinates: 23°54′04″N 106°37′04″E
- Country: China
- Province: Guangxi
- Prefecture-level city: Baise
- District seat: Baicheng Subdistrict

Area
  - Total: 3,713 km^{2} (1,434 sq mi)

Population (2020 census)
  - Total: 472,086
  - Density: 127.1/km^{2} (329.3/sq mi)
- Time zone: UTC+8 (China Standard)
- Website: www.bsyj.gov.cn

Youjiang District (simplified Chinese: 右江区; traditional Chinese: 右江區; pinyin: Yòujiāng Qū; Zhuang: Yougyangh Gih) is the municipal district of Baise, Guangxi, China, named after the Youjiang River which runs through the middle of the district.

== Administration ==
Youjiang District is divided into 2 subdistricts, 4 towns, 2 townships and 1 ethnic township:

- Baicheng Subdistrict (百城街道)
- Longjing Subdistrict (龙景街道)
- Yangxu Town (阳圩镇)
- Sitang Town (四塘镇)
- Longchuan Town (龙川镇)
- Yongle Town (永乐镇)
- Dalang Township (大楞乡)
- Yangshui Township (泮水乡)
- Wangdian Yao Ethnic Township (汪甸瑶族乡)

== Demographics ==
Youjiang District's population was 320,000 (2010). 73% of the people belong to the Zhuang ethnic group, and most speak Youjiang Zhuang (Gangjdoj). The rest include Han, Yao, Miao, and other ethnic groups.
