= Tianyang District =

Tianyang 田阳区 · Denzyangz Gih · Gih Denzyangz
- District
- Location of the seat in Guangxi
- Coordinates: 23°44′09″N 106°54′55″E
- Country: China
- Region: Guangxi
- Prefecture-level city: Baise
- Township-level divisions: 9 towns 1 township
- County seat: Tianzhou (田州镇)

Area
  - Total: 2,395 km^{2} (925 sq mi)
- Elevation: 115 m (377 ft)

Population (2010)
  - Total: 338,300
  - Density: 141.3/km^{2} (365.8/sq mi)
- Time zone: UTC+8 (China Standard)
- Website: xq.bsyjrb.com/ty/

Tianyang District (Chinese: 田阳区; pinyin: Tiányáng Qū; Standard Zhuang: Denzyangz Gih; Youjiang Zhuang: Gih Denzyangz) is a district in western Guangxi, China. It is under the administration of the prefecture-level city of Baise.

== History ==
Tianyang County was formed in 1935 by combining Fengyi County (奉议县) and Enyang County (恩阳县) with the county seat in Napo (那坡镇) and in 1954 the county seat was moved to Tianzhou (田州镇). In 1935 the population was 135,071.

In August 2019, the county was converted into a district.

== Administrative divisions ==
There are 9 towns and 1 township in the district:

Towns:

- Tianzhou (田州镇)
- Napo (那坡镇)
- Pohong (坡洪镇)
- Naman (那满镇)
- Baiyu (百育镇)
- Yufeng (玉凤镇)
- Toutang (头塘镇)
- Wucun (五村镇)
- Dongjing (洞靖镇)

Township:

- Babie Township (巴别乡)

== Demographics ==
Tianyang's population was 338,300 in 2010. 90.2% of the people belong to the Zhuang ethnic group, and speak Youjiang Zhuang (Gangjdoj). The rest include Han, Yao, Miao, and other ethnic groups.

== Climate ==
Climate data for Tianyang, elevation 133 m (436 ft), (1991–2020 normals, extremes 1991–present)
Month	Jan	Feb	Mar	Apr	May	Jun	Jul	Aug	Sep	Oct	Nov	Dec	Year
Record high °C (°F)	30.8 (87.4)	35.4 (95.7)	39.0 (102.2)	40.7 (105.3)	39.6 (103.3)	39.9 (103.8)	39.7 (103.5)	40.0 (104.0)	38.7 (101.7)	35.2 (95.4)	33.2 (91.8)	32.7 (90.9)	40.7 (105.3)
Mean daily maximum °C (°F)	18.0 (64.4)	20.7 (69.3)	23.9 (75.0)	29.0 (84.2)	31.3 (88.3)	32.3 (90.1)	33.2 (91.8)	33.5 (92.3)	31.9 (89.4)	28.4 (83.1)	24.7 (76.5)	20.0 (68.0)	27.2 (81.0)
Daily mean °C (°F)	13.8 (56.8)	16.1 (61.0)	19.3 (66.7)	24.0 (75.2)	26.7 (80.1)	27.9 (82.2)	28.4 (83.1)	28.4 (83.1)	26.8 (80.2)	23.4 (74.1)	19.4 (66.9)	15.1 (59.2)	22.4 (72.4)
Mean daily minimum °C (°F)	11.0 (51.8)	13.0 (55.4)	16.1 (61.0)	20.5 (68.9)	23.3 (73.9)	25.0 (77.0)	25.3 (77.5)	25.1 (77.2)	23.4 (74.1)	20.2 (68.4)	16.0 (60.8)	11.8 (53.2)	19.2 (66.6)
Record low °C (°F)	1.0 (33.8)	2.7 (36.9)	5.3 (41.5)	9.6 (49.3)	15.7 (60.3)	19.3 (66.7)	21.7 (71.1)	21.7 (71.1)	16.1 (61.0)	10.6 (51.1)	4.9 (40.8)	1.4 (34.5)	1.0 (33.8)
Average precipitation mm (inches)	30.4 (1.20)	17.6 (0.69)	36.9 (1.45)	52.5 (2.07)	140.9 (5.55)	212.9 (8.38)	201.2 (7.92)	180.0 (7.09)	125.9 (4.96)	70.9 (2.79)	35.3 (1.39)	24.6 (0.97)	1,129.1 (44.46)
Average precipitation days (≥ 0.1 mm)	7.4	6.8	8.9	9.1	12.6	14.8	15.4	14.1	10.2	7.4	6.2	5.3	118.2
Average snowy days	0.1	0	0	0	0	0	0	0	0	0	0	0.1	0.2
Average relative humidity (%)	76	74	75	73	76	82	82	80	79	78	77	74	77
Mean monthly sunshine hours	81.4	94.0	108.6	152.6	177.2	163.4	195.3	203.0	182.0	153.8	141.6	115.1	1,768
Percentage possible sunshine	24	29	29	40	43	40	47	51	50	43	43	35	40
Source: China Meteorological Administration

== Culture and Arts ==
Tianyang boasts many traditional singing styles, beyond folk songs, including Cantonese opera, Colourful Opera (彩调), Zhuang opera, and the "Tang Emperor" (唐皇) style.

== Transportation ==
Apart from road access including the G80 Guangzhou–Kunming Expressway, the district also has rail access via Tianyang Railway Station which is part of the Nanning–Kunming high-speed railway network and air access via Baise Bama Airport.
