= Nanning–Kunming railway =

Railway line in China

Nanning–Kunming railway 南昆铁路

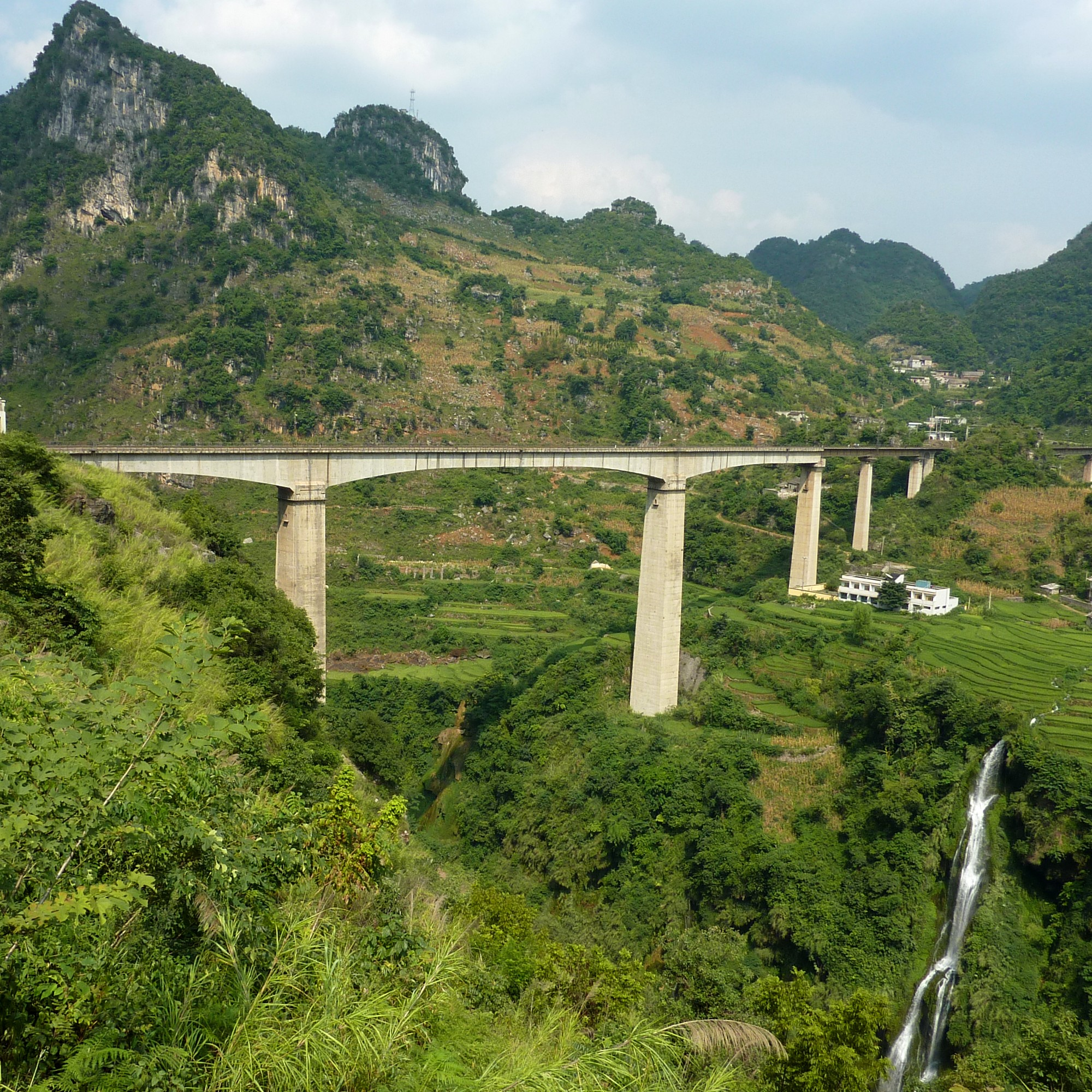
- The Qingshuihe Railway Bridge of the Nanning–Kunming railway in Guizhou

Overview
- Status: Active
- Termini: Nanning; Kunming

Service
- Type: Heavy rail
- Operator(s): China Railway

Technical
- Line length: 898.7 km (558.4 mi)
- Number of tracks: 2 (Nanning–Baise); 1 (Baise–Kunming)
- Track gauge: 1,435 mm (4 ft 8 1/2 in) standard gauge
- Electrification: 25 kV/50 Hz AC overhead catenary
- Operating speed: 120 km/h (75 mph)

The Nanning–Kunming railway, or Nankun railway (simplified Chinese: 南昆铁路; traditional Chinese: 南昆鐵路; pinyin: nánkūn tiělù), is a single-track electrified railway in Southwest China between Nanning and Kunming, provincial capitals, respectively, of Guangxi Zhuang Autonomous Region and Yunnan Province. The railway was built from December 24, 1990, to March 18, 1997, and has a total length of 898.7 km (558 mi), including the main line of 863.04 km (536 mi) between Nanning and Kunming and a branch line from Weishe Township of Xingyi City to Hongguo Township of Liupanshui municipality, in Guizhou province. The Nankun Railway is a major rail conduit in Southwest China. Major cities and towns along route include Nanning, Baise, Xingyi, Luoping and Kunming.

The Qingshuihe Railway Bridge (Qingshui River Railway Bridge) carries the railway across the deep gorge of the Quigshui River. It is one of the highest bridges in the world and the fifth-highest railway bridge. The bridge is 590 feet (180 meters) high and has a 420-foot (130-meter) main span. The bridge opened in 2000.

The Nanning–Kunming railway provides the shortest railway connection between Yunnan Province and China's sea ports on the Tonkin Gulf, such as Fangchenggang and Beihai, thus playing a role somewhat similar to that played by the Kunming–Hai Phong railway before World War II.

== Rail connections ==
- Nanning: Hunan–Guangxi railway
- Tiandong: the Tiandong-Debao branch (open 2010), primarily used by the bauxite mining industry.
- Weishe (Xingyi): Weishe–Hongguo railway
- Kunming: Shanghai–Kunming railway / Neijiang–Kunming railway, Chengdu–Kunming railway

== See also ==
- Nanning–Kunming high-speed railway
- List of railways in China
