= Baise =

Baise 百色市 • Bwzswz Si•Singz Baksaek
- Prefecture-level city
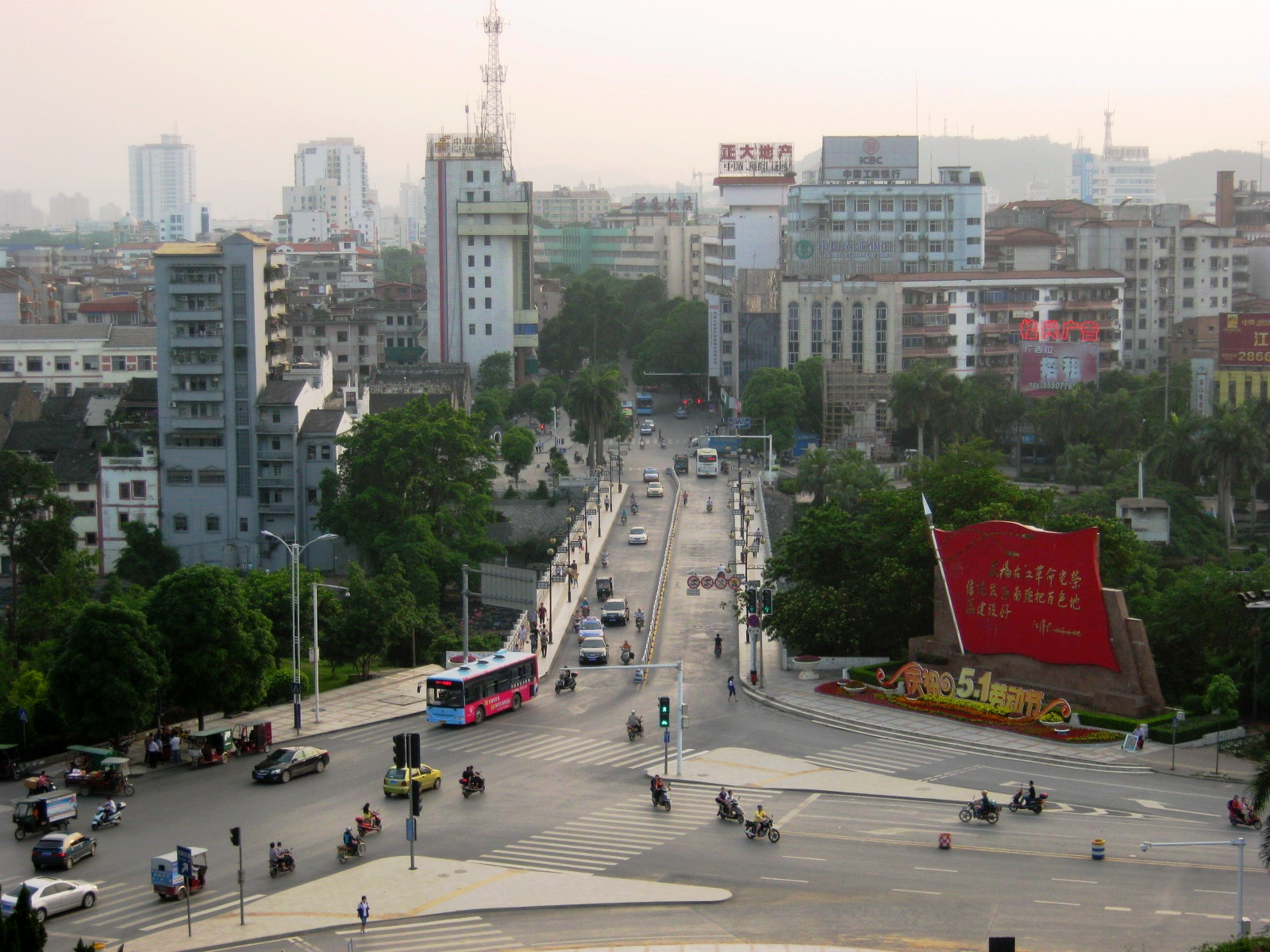
- Baise in 2013

- Location of Baise in Guangxi

- Location in China
- Coordinates (Baise municipal government): 23°54′11″N 106°37′08″E
- Country: People's Republic of China
- Region: Guangxi
- County-level divisions: 1 district 1 county-level city 9 counties 1 autonomous county
- Municipal seat: Youjiang District

Government
  - Mayor: Zhou Yijue (周异决)

Area
  - Prefecture-level city: 36,252 km^{2} (13,997 sq mi)
- Elevation: 137 m (449 ft)

Population (2020)
  - Prefecture-level city: 3,571,505
  - Density: 98.519/km^{2} (255.16/sq mi)
  - Urban: 1,551,425

GDP
  - Prefecture-level city: CN¥ 156.9 billion US$ 24.3 billion
  - Per capita: CN¥ 43,892; US$ 6,803
- Time zone: UTC+08:00 (China Standard)
- Postal code: 530000
- Area code: 0776
- ISO 3166 code: CN-GX-10
- Licence plate prefixes: 桂L
- Website: baise.gov.cn

Baise

Chinese name
- Chinese: 百色
- Literal meaning: hundred colours
Transcriptions
Standard Mandarin
- Hanyu Pinyin: Bǎisè, Bósè

Zhuang name
- Zhuang: Baksaek
- 1957 orthography: Bɯƨsɯƨ

Baise (Chinese: 百色; pinyin: Bǎisè, Bósè; local pronunciation: paːk˧˥ ɬɐk˥), or Bose, is the westernmost prefecture-level city of Guangxi, China bordering Vietnam as well as the provinces of Guizhou and Yunnan. At the end of 2024, the registered population of the city was 4,214,900, and the resident population of the city was 3,464,700, of which the urban resident population was 1,636 million, accounting for 47.22% of the resident population (the urbanization rate of the resident population).

The name is from Youjiang Zhuang Baksaek, meaning "in, or blocking, a mountain pass". The name Bwzswz is the Zhuang transliteration of the Chinese name.

== Geography and climate ==
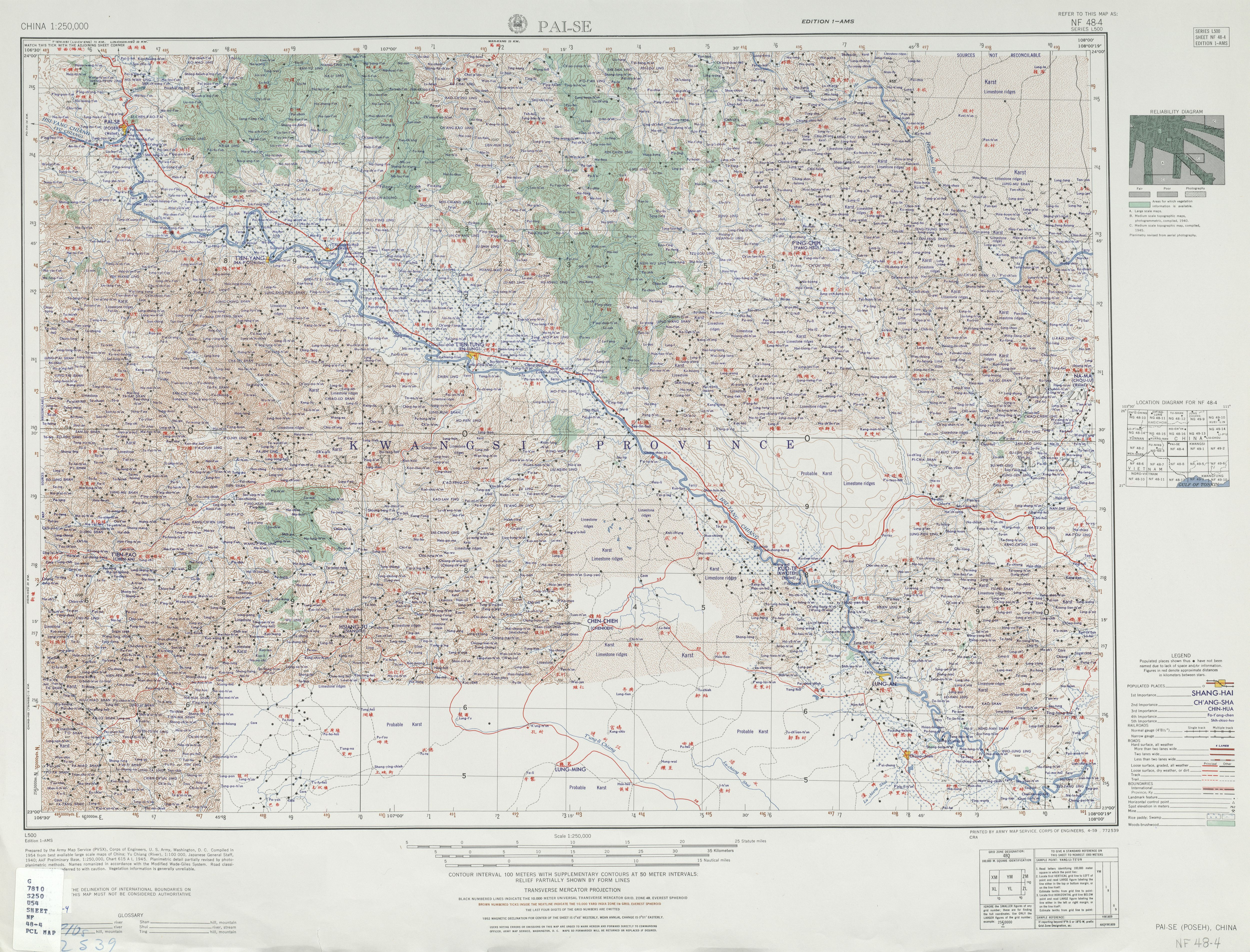
Baise (labelled as PAI-SE (POSEH) 百色) (1954)

Baise is located in western-northwestern Guangxi bordering Qianxinan Buyei and Miao Autonomous Prefecture (Guizhou) to the north, Qujing and Wenshan Zhuang and Miao Autonomous Prefecture of Yunnan to the west, the Vietnamese provinces of Hà Giang and Cao Bằng to the south and southwest, and the Guangxi cities of Hechi to the northeast/east, Nanning to the east, and Chongzuo to the southeast. It is centrally located between three provincial capitals: Nanning, Kunming, and Guiyang. Its area is 36,252 km^{2} (13,997 sq mi) and is more than 55% forested.

Baise has a monsoon-influenced, humid subtropical climate (Köppen Cwa), with short, mild, and dry winters, and long, very hot and humid summers. The monthly 24-hour average temperature ranges from 13.5 °C (56.3 °F) in January to 28.4 °C (83.1 °F) in July, for an annual mean of 22.12 °C (71.8 °F). Rainfall is low compared to more easterly locations in Guangxi, averaging around 1,067 mm (42 in) per annum, a majority of which occurs from June to August. There are 1,706 hours of bright sunshine annually. Significant temperature variation exists in the prefecture; the western parts, with an average elevation surpassing 500 m (1,640 ft), lie along the southeastern fringes of the Yunnan–Guizhou Plateau, and hold a climate similar to that of central Yunnan, with much more moderate summer temperatures. With monthly percent possible sunshine ranging from 25% in January and February to 49% in August, the city receives 1,706 hours of bright sunshine annually.

Climate data for Baise, elevation 175 m (574 ft), (1991–2020 normals, extremes 1951–present)
| Month | Jan | Feb | Mar | Apr | May | Jun | Jul | Aug | Sep | Oct | Nov | Dec | Year |
|---|---|---|---|---|---|---|---|---|---|---|---|---|---|
| Record high °C (°F) | 33.4 (92.1) | 38.4 (101.1) | 38.9 (102.0) | 42.5 (108.5) | 42.2 (108.0) | 40.8 (105.4) | 40.1 (104.2) | 40.1 (104.2) | 39.6 (103.3) | 37.0 (98.6) | 34.0 (93.2) | 32.8 (91.0) | 42.5 (108.5) |
| Mean daily maximum °C (°F) | 18.0 (64.4) | 20.9 (69.6) | 24.4 (75.9) | 29.6 (85.3) | 32.1 (89.8) | 32.9 (91.2) | 33.5 (92.3) | 33.6 (92.5) | 32.0 (89.6) | 28.5 (83.3) | 24.7 (76.5) | 19.9 (67.8) | 27.5 (81.5) |
| Daily mean °C (°F) | 13.5 (56.3) | 15.9 (60.6) | 19.3 (66.7) | 24.0 (75.2) | 26.8 (80.2) | 28.1 (82.6) | 28.5 (83.3) | 28.0 (82.4) | 26.4 (79.5) | 23.1 (73.6) | 19.0 (66.2) | 14.7 (58.5) | 22.3 (72.1) |
| Mean daily minimum °C (°F) | 10.6 (51.1) | 12.6 (54.7) | 15.8 (60.4) | 20.0 (68.0) | 22.7 (72.9) | 24.6 (76.3) | 25.0 (77.0) | 24.5 (76.1) | 22.8 (73.0) | 19.7 (67.5) | 15.5 (59.9) | 11.4 (52.5) | 18.8 (65.8) |
| Record low °C (°F) | −2.0 (28.4) | 1.4 (34.5) | 4.0 (39.2) | 7.6 (45.7) | 13.3 (55.9) | 17.2 (63.0) | 19.5 (67.1) | 19.3 (66.7) | 14.4 (57.9) | 8.4 (47.1) | 4.2 (39.6) | 0.1 (32.2) | −2.0 (28.4) |
| Average precipitation mm (inches) | 26.6 (1.05) | 19.1 (0.75) | 33.6 (1.32) | 51.3 (2.02) | 147.1 (5.79) | 222.7 (8.77) | 195.8 (7.71) | 174.7 (6.88) | 105.9 (4.17) | 72.5 (2.85) | 31.5 (1.24) | 23.5 (0.93) | 1,104.3 (43.48) |
| Average precipitation days (≥ 0.1 mm) | 7.4 | 7.1 | 8.0 | 8.7 | 12.1 | 15.0 | 15.4 | 14.4 | 9.6 | 7.9 | 6.5 | 5.6 | 117.7 |
| Average snowy days | 0.1 | 0 | 0 | 0 | 0 | 0 | 0 | 0 | 0 | 0 | 0 | 0 | 0.1 |
| Average relative humidity (%) | 76 | 73 | 73 | 73 | 71 | 72 | 78 | 79 | 80 | 79 | 78 | 78 | 76 |
| Mean monthly sunshine hours | 70.9 | 84.8 | 102.0 | 140.4 | 160.6 | 143.7 | 167.5 | 185.6 | 163.2 | 133.1 | 128.5 | 99.4 | 1,579.7 |
| Percentage possible sunshine | 21 | 26 | 27 | 37 | 39 | 35 | 40 | 47 | 45 | 37 | 39 | 30 | 35 |
Source 1: China Meteorological Administration
Source 2: Weather ChinaNOAA extremes

== History ==
The name of the city Baise is a Chinese transliteration of its original name in Youjiang Zhuang language, Baksaek, which probably means jammed gap (literally mouth(bak) blocked (saek)). Baise is young by Chinese standards and was founded as a town in 1730. It is the town where Deng Xiaoping, Chen Haoren and other leaders of the Chinese Communist Party organized the Baise Uprising against the Nationalist government on December 11, 1929. The uprising was also named Youjiang Rebellion.

== Administration ==
Baise has 2 districts, 2 county-level city, 7 counties, and 1 autonomous county.

District:

- Youjiang District (右江区)
- Tianyang District (田阳区)

County-level city:

- Jingxi (靖西市)
- Pingguo (平果市)

Counties:

- Tiandong County (田东县)
- Debao County (德保县)
- Lingyun County (凌云县)
- Napo County (那坡县)
- Leye County (乐业县)
- Xilin County (西林县)
- Tianlin County (田林县)

Autonomous County:

- Longlin Various Nationalities Autonomous County (隆林各族自治县)

Map
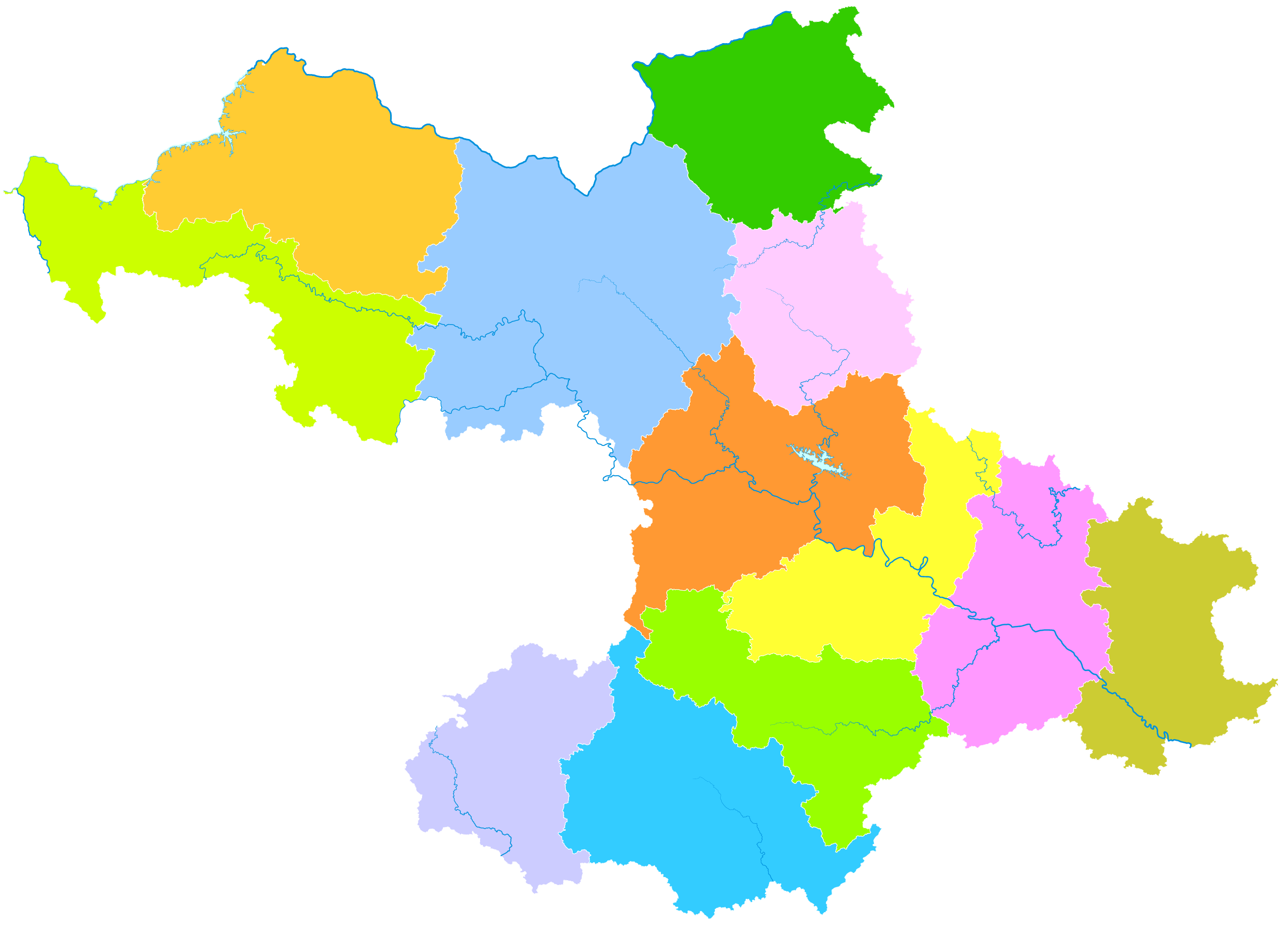

== Demographics ==
Baise's resident population in 2020 was 3,571,505, 1,551,425 of whom lived in urban areas. 74.95% of the population belonged to the Zhuang ethnic group. The rest include Han, Yao, Miao, Hui, and other ethnic groups.

| English name | Simplified | Pinyin | Zhuang | Area | Population (2020) |
|---|---|---|---|---|---|
| Youjiang District | 右江区 | Yòujiāng Qū | Yougyangh Gih | 3,713 | 472,086 |
| Tianyang District | 田阳区 | Tiányáng Qū | Denzyangz Gih | 2,394 | 308,785 |
| Jingxi City | 靖西市 | Jìngxī Shì | Cingsae Si | 3,322 | 489,163 |
| Pingguo City | 平果市 | Píngguǒ Shì | Bingzgoj Si | 2,485 | 455,643 |
| Tiandong County | 田东县 | Tiándōng Xiàn | Denzdoeng Yen | 2,816 | 352,007 |
| Debao County | 德保县 | Débǎo Xiàn | Dwzbauj Yen | 2,575 | 269,758 |
| Napo County | 那坡县 | Nàpō Xiàn | Nazboh Yen | 2,230 | 171,781 |
| Lingyun County | 凌云县 | Língyún Xiàn | Lingzyinz Yen | 2,053 | 188,194 |
| Leye County | 乐业县 | Lèyè Xiàn | Lozyez Yen | 2,617 | 146,397 |
| Tianlin County | 田林县 | Tiánlín Xiàn | Denzlaem Yen | 5,577 | 224,828 |
| Xilin County | 西林县 | Xīlín Xiàn | Saelaem Yen | 2,955 | 142,098 |
| Longlin Various Nationalities Autonomous County | 隆林各族自治县 | Lónglín Gèzú Zìzhìxiàn Xiàn | Lungzlaem Gozcuz Swci Yen | 3,542 | 350,765 |

Ethnic groups in Baise (2020)
| | Percentage |
| Zhuang | 74.95% |
| Han | 16.47% |
| Yao | 4.13% |
| Miao | 3.89% |
| Others | 0.56% |
https://www.hongheiku.com/minzu/2387.html

== Economy ==
Baise is one of China's most important producers of aluminum with both aluminum ore mining and aluminum product manufacturing. Baise's tropical climate make it a major food producer, especially fruits. Other natural resources include forest products, petroleum, natural gas, copper, and quartz. Baise is also Guangxi's third biggest producer of hydropower with 5 million kilowatts produced annually. Baise is also famous for mangoes.

== Tourism ==
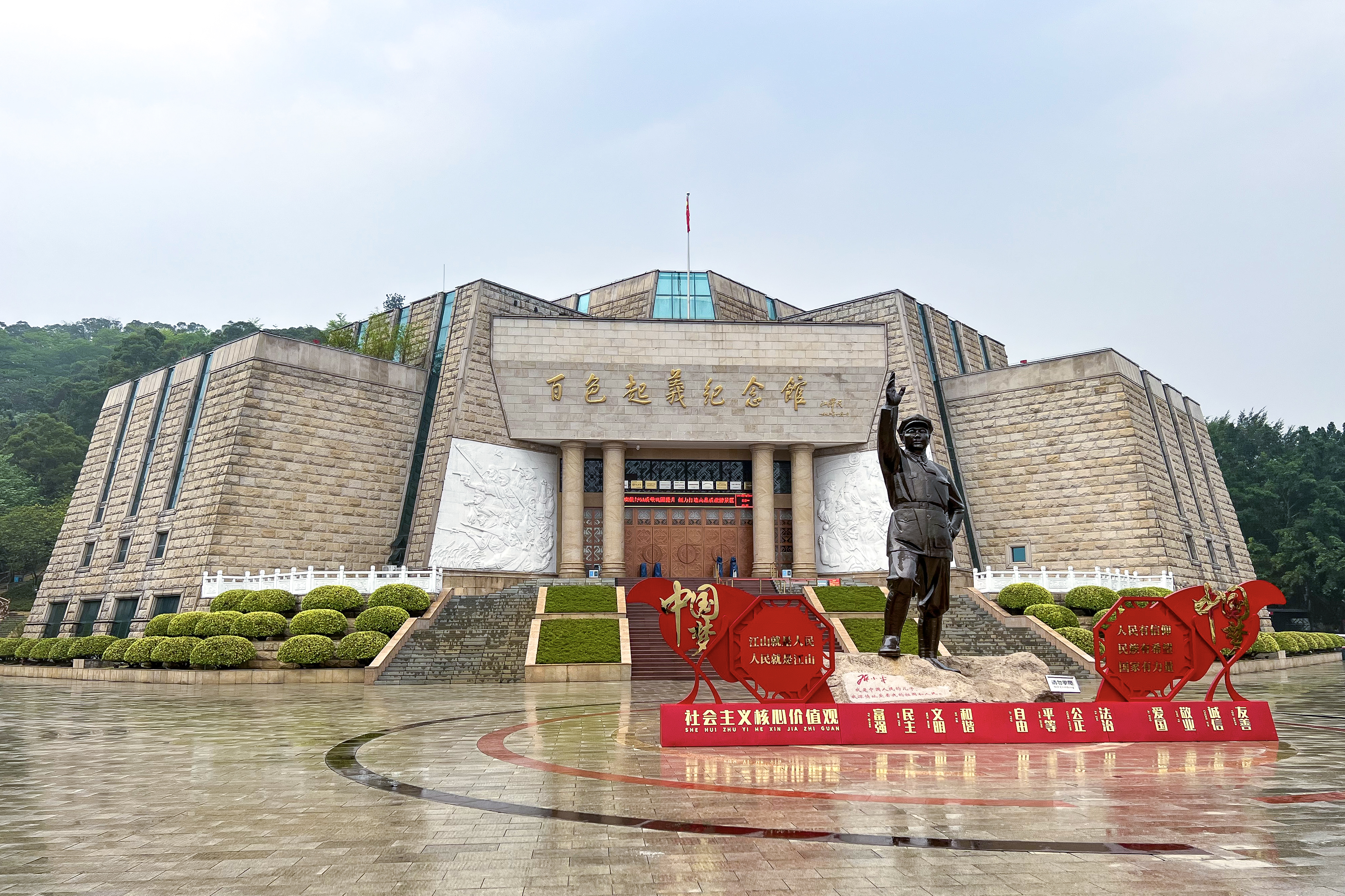
Baise Uprising Memorial Hall

Baise's forested mountains harbor numerous species of plants and animals. The border areas are some of the least developed lands left in China. These features along with unique ethnic minority culture and important historical sites make it a growing tourist destination.

== Transportation ==
- G69 Yinchuan–Baise Expressway
- Baise railway station
- Baise Bama Airport
