= Second Sino-Japanese War =

1937–1945 conflict in East Asia

- Part of the interwar period, and the Asian-Pacific Theater of World War II (Note: From December 1941.)
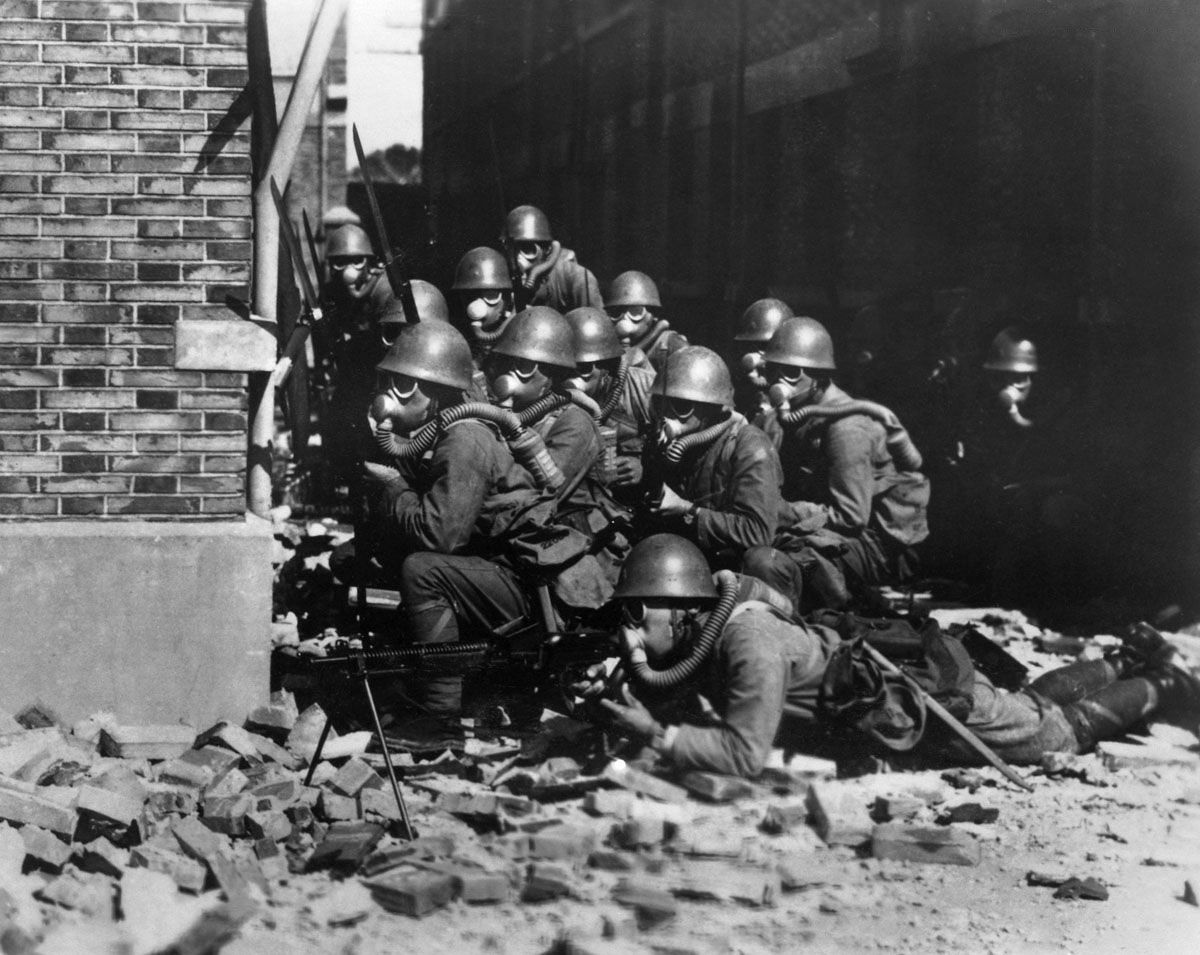
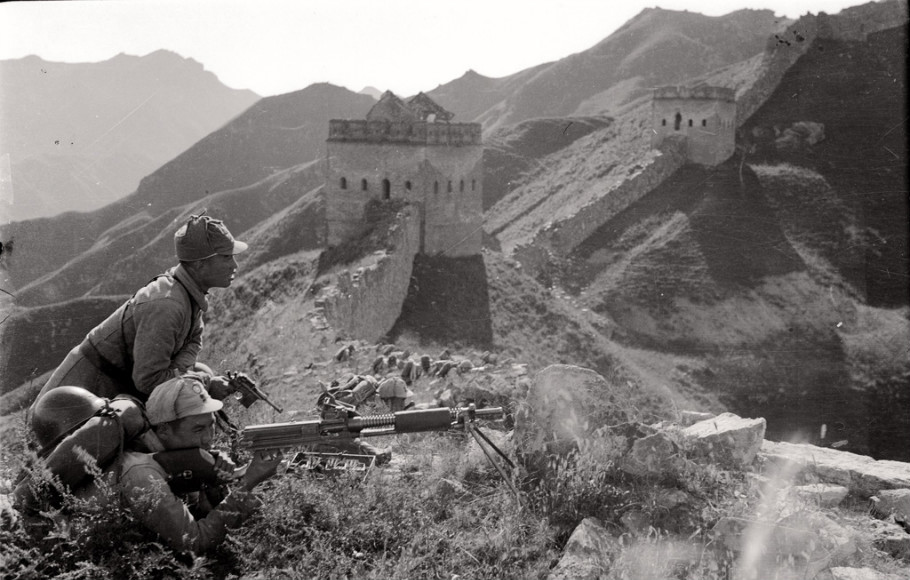
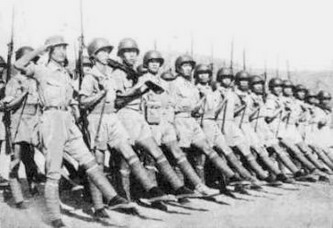
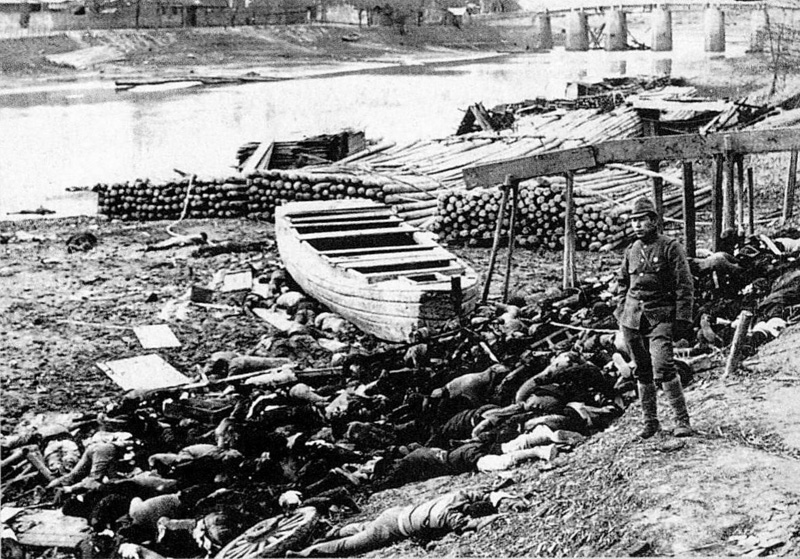
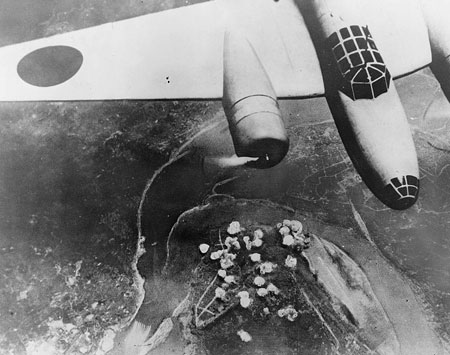
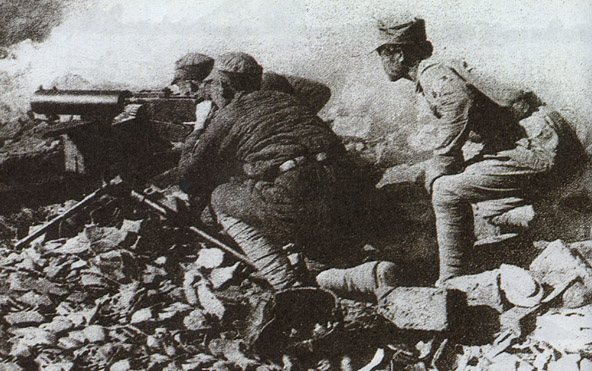
- Clockwise: Japanese landing forces in gas masks during the Battle of Shanghai; NRA forces on the Great Wall; Nanjing Massacre victims on the Qinhuai River shore; Chinese machine gun nest at the Battle of Wuhan; Japanese Mitsubishi Ki-21 in the bombing of Chongqing; Chinese Expeditionary Force marching in India
Date	7 July 1937 (Note: Initial earlier clashes began on September 18, 1931) – 2 September 1945 (8 years, 1 month, 3 weeks and 5 days)
Location	Mainland China; Burma; Korea; Indochina; Taiwan
Result	Allied victory
Territorial changes	China recovers territories lost to Japan since the Treaty of Shimonoseki, as well as retaking de facto control from the Japanese puppet states

Belligerents
China; Kuomintang; Chinese Communist Party; (Soviet Union) Soviet Volunteer Group; (United States) American Volunteer Group; British Empire (Note: The British Empire supported the Chinese forces against Japan by sending supplies through the Burma Road, linking British colonies in India and Burma to China. Chinese forces also fought with British Empire forces against the Japanese in the Burma campaign to restore Allied usage after the Japanese occupied most of the Burma Road.); United Kingdom; India; Burma; United States (Note: From December 1941.); China Burma India theater (Note: Generalissimo Chiang Kai-shek was the Supreme Allied Commander in the China Theater, meaning U.S. forces technically fell under his overall command. In practice, U.S. commanders often broke the chain of command; see #Tensions with Allied commanders); Soviet Union (Note: The Red Army fought the Japanese in border conflicts in the 1930's that included the Battles of Khalkhin Gol in 1939. War was restarted against Japan when Soviet forces invaded Manchukuo.); Mongolia	Empire of Japan; Manchukuo; Wang Jingwei regime (Note: Formed from the Reformed and Provisional Governments of the Republic of China in 1 March 1940, which absorbed the East Hebei Autonomous Government and Great Way Government in 1 February 1938 and 3 May 1938.); Mengjiang (Note: Direct puppet state prior to March 1940, initially as the Mongol United Autonomous Government until 1939.); North China Political Council (Note: Direct puppet state prior to March 1940, as the Provisional Government of the Republic of China.)

Commanders and leaders
KMT: Chiang Kai-shek; He Yingqin; Chen Cheng; Bai Chongxi; Cheng Qian; Xu Yongchang; CCP: Mao Zedong; Zhu De; Ye Ting; Chen Yi; SEAC: (British Empire) Lord Mountbatten; (United States) Joseph Stilwell; Sun Li-jen; Liao Yaoxiang; Red Army: (Soviet Union) Georgy Zhukov (1930's); (Soviet Union) Aleksandr Vasilevsky (1945)	Imperial General HQ: Hirohito; Kan'in Kotohito; Hajime Sugiyama; Hideki Tojo; Yoshijirō Umezu; North China Area Army: (Note: One of two army formations that ultimately merged to form the China Expeditionary Army); Hisaichi Terauchi; Hayao Tada; Central China Area Army (Note: One of two army formations that ultimately merged to form the China Expeditionary Army): Iwane Matsui; Otozō Yamada; China Expeditionary Army: Shunroku Hata; Toshizō Nishio; Yasuji Okamura

Units involved
- See combatants

Strength
16 million+ total Nationalists 1.7 million (1937) 2.6 million (1939) 5.7 million (1945) Communists 640,000 (1937) 166,700 (1938) 488,744 (1940) 1.2 million (1945)	4.1 million total Japan 600,000 (1937) 1,015,000 (1939) 1,124,900 (1945) (excluding Manchuria and Burma campaign) Puppet states 900,000–1,006,086 (1945)

Casualties and losses
Official Nationalist data 1,319,958 killed 1,761,335 wounded 130,116 missing 3,211,409 total casualties Western Estimate 2,000,000+ killed (Note: Rummel estimates Chinese losses at 3 to 4 million dead and missing with another 500,000 captured, with a combined total of over 10,000,000 military casualties) Communist data 160,603–161,067 killed 285,669–290,467 wounded 87,208 missing 45,989 POWs 446,736 (Note: From September 1937 until March 1945 (including losses of the South China Anti-Japanese Column from 1943 until March 1945). Does not include the number of missing and POWs.) to 584,267 total casualties Total 3.85 million casualties 1 million+ captured 266,800–1,000,000 POWs dead	Japanese medical data 455,700–700,000 military dead (Note: This number does not include Japanese killed by Chinese forces in the Burma campaign and does not include Japanese killed in Manchuria.) (Note: After July 1937; excluding Manchuria and Burma) 900,000 wounded 1.5~ million total casualties Puppet state forces 288,140–574,560 dead 742,000 wounded Middle estimate: 960,000 dead and wounded Total 2.4–3.0 million casualties (Note: Including casualties of Japanese puppet forces.)
- 12,000,000+ civilian deaths 14,000,000–22,000,000 total deaths 35,000,000 total Chinese casualties (Chinese claim)

Second Sino-Japanese War

Chinese name
- Traditional Chinese: 抗日戰爭
- Simplified Chinese: 抗日战争
- Literal meaning: War of Resistance against Japanese Aggression
Transcriptions
Standard Mandarin
- Hanyu Pinyin: kàng rì zhàn zhēng
- Bopomofo: ㄎㄤˋ ㄖˋ ㄓㄢˋ ㄓㄥ

Alternative name
- Traditional Chinese: 抗戰
- Simplified Chinese: 抗战
- Literal meaning: War of Resistance
Transcriptions
Standard Mandarin
- Hanyu Pinyin: kàng zhàn

Second alternative Chinese name
- Traditional Chinese: 八年抗戰
- Simplified Chinese: 八年抗战
- Literal meaning: Eight Years' War of Resistance
Transcriptions
Standard Mandarin
- Hanyu Pinyin: bā nián kàng zhàn

Third alternative Chinese name
- Traditional Chinese: 十四年抗戰
- Simplified Chinese: 十四年抗战
- Literal meaning: Fourteen Years' War of Resistance
Transcriptions
Standard Mandarin
- Hanyu Pinyin: shí sì nián kàng zhàn

Fourth alternative Chinese name
- Traditional Chinese: 第二次中日戰爭
- Simplified Chinese: 第二次中日战争
- Literal meaning: Second Sino-Japanese War
Transcriptions
Standard Mandarin
- Hanyu Pinyin: dì èr cì zhōng rì zhàn zhēng

Fifth alternative Chinese name
- Traditional Chinese: (日本)侵華戰爭
- Simplified Chinese: (日本)侵华战争
- Literal meaning: (Japanese) War of Aggression against China
Transcriptions
Standard Mandarin
- Hanyu Pinyin: (rì běn) qīn huá zhàn zhēng

Japanese name
- Kanji: 支那事変; 日支戦争; 日中戦争
- Hiragana: しなじへん; にっしせんそう; にっちゅうせんそう
- Katakana: シナジヘン; ニッシセンソウ; ニッチュウセンソウ
Transcriptions
- Romanization: Shina jihen; Nisshi sensō; Nicchū sensō
- Kunrei-shiki: Sina zihen; Nissi sensou; Nittyuu sensou

The Second Sino-Japanese War (Note: known in China as the War of Resistance Against Japan simplified Chinese: 抗日战争; traditional Chinese: 抗日戰爭; pinyin: Kàngrì Zhànzhēng) was fought between the Republic of China and the Empire of Japan and its puppet states between 1937 and 1945, following a period of conflict that started in 1931. It is often regarded as the beginning of World War II in Asia, as the wars became heavily intertwined after Japan attacked the United States. It was the largest Asian war in the 20th century.

On 18 September 1931, the Japanese staged the Mukden incident, a false flag event fabricated to justify their invasion of Manchuria and establishment of the puppet state of Manchukuo. This is sometimes marked as the beginning of the war. From 1931 to 1937, China and Japan engaged in skirmishes, including in Shanghai and in Northern China. Nationalist and Chinese Communist Party (CCP) forces, respectively led by Chiang Kai-shek and Mao Zedong, had fought each other in the Chinese Civil War since 1927. In late 1933, Chiang Kai-shek encircled the Chinese Communists in an attempt to finally destroy them, forcing the Communists into the Long March, resulting in the Communists losing around 90% of their men. As a Japanese invasion became imminent, Chiang eventually formed a United Front with the Communists in 1936, a process that was hastened by the Xi'an Incident.

The war is considered to have begun on 7 July 1937 after the Marco Polo Bridge incident near Beijing, which escalated into full-scale Japanese invasion of the rest of China. Following the protracted Battle of Shanghai, the Japanese captured the capital of Nanjing in 1937 and perpetrated the Nanjing Massacre. After failing to stop the Japanese capture of Wuhan in 1938, China's de facto capital at the time, the Nationalist government relocated to Chongqing in the Chinese interior. After the Sino-Soviet Non-Aggression Pact, Soviet aid bolstered the National Revolutionary Army and Air Force. By 1939, after Chinese victories at Changsha and with Japan's lines of communication stretched deep into the interior, the war reached a stalemate. The Japanese were unable to defeat CCP forces in Shaanxi, who waged a campaign of sabotage and guerrilla warfare. In November 1939, Nationalist forces launched a large scale winter offensive, and in August 1940, CCP forces launched the Hundred Regiments Offensive in central China. In retaliation, Japanese forces implemented massive scorched earth policies in North and Central China, killing millions of civilians.

In April 1941, Soviet aid was halted with the Soviet–Japanese Neutrality Pact. In December 1941, Japan launched a surprise attack on Pearl Harbor and declared war on the United States and the United Kingdom. The US increased its aid to China under the Lend-Lease Act, becoming its main financial and military supporter. The British Empire supported the Chinese forces against Japan by sending supplies through the Burma Road, linking British colonies in India and Burma to China. Chinese forces also fought with British Empire forces against the Japanese in the Burma campaign to restore Allied usage after the Japanese occupied most of the Burma Road. With Burma cut off, the United States Army Air Forces airlifted material over the Himalayas. In 1944, Japan launched Operation Ichi-Go, the invasion of Henan and Changsha. In 1945, the Chinese Expeditionary Force resumed its advance in Burma and completed the Ledo Road linking India to China. China launched large counteroffensives in South China, repulsed a failed Japanese invasion of West Hunan, and recaptured Japanese occupied regions of Guangxi.

Japan formally surrendered on 2 September 1945, following the atomic bombings of Hiroshima and Nagasaki, Soviet declaration of war and subsequent invasion of Manchuria, Inner Mongolia and Korea. The war resulted in the deaths of around 20 million people, mostly Chinese civilians. Japan carried out the largest attacks in the history of biological warfare, causing at least 200,000 deaths, and used chemical weapons including lethal blister agents. China was recognized as one of the Big Four Allied powers in World War II and one of the "Four Policemen", which formed the foundation of the United Nations. It regained Taiwan and became one of the five permanent members of the United Nations Security Council.

The Japanese surrender ceremony that ended World War II in China, occurred in Nanjing on 9 September 1945. The forces of the Imperial Japanese Army agreed with the Allies terms to cease all armed conflict in the Pacific. During the 15-minute ceremony, General Yasuji Okamura, Commander-in-Chief of the China Expeditionary Army of the Imperial Japanese Army, signed the surrender document which was written in both Japanese and Chinese. The unconditional surrender was overseen and accepted by Kuomintang General He Yingqin, the Chinese representative of Allies of World War II and the commander-in-chief of the Republic of China National Revolutionary Army and British Major-General Eric Hayes.

The Chinese Civil War resumed in 1946, ending with a communist victory and the Proclamation of the People's Republic of China in 1949, while the government of the Republic of China relocated to Taiwan.

== Names ==
=== Chinese ===
In both China's Mainland and Taiwan, the war is most commonly known as the "War of Resistance against Japanese Aggression" (simplified Chinese: 抗日战争; traditional Chinese: 抗日戰爭), and the name of it is usually shortened to "Resistance against Japanese Aggression" (抗日) or the "War of Resistance" (抗战; 抗戰). The countries also use the term "Eight Years' War of Resistance" (八年抗战; 八年抗戰), a traditional view which dates the war's beginning to the Marco Polo Bridge incident in 1937.

Since 2017, the Chinese Communist Party's official view of Chinese historiography has held the 18 September 1931 Japanese invasion of Manchuria as the start of the" Fourteen Years' War of Resistance" (十四年抗战; 十四年抗戰). The 1931–1937 period is viewed as the "partial" war, which includes the "Northeast War of Resistance" (东北抗战), while 1937–1945 is viewed as a period of "total" war. This view of a fourteen-year war has political significance because it provides more recognition, internationally as China claims it fought the earliest and longest in a global war, and domestically for the role of northeast China in the War of Resistance. The CCP officially calls the conflict as "Chinese People's War of Resistance against Japanese Aggression" (Chinese: 中国人民抗日战争), while referring to it as part of the "World Anti-Fascist War", an alternate definition of World War II.

=== Japanese ===
In contemporary Japan, the name "Japan–China War" (Japanese: 日中戦争, romanized: Nitchū Sensō) is most commonly used because of its perceived objectivity. Dating the beginning of the war may also vary in Japanese context, with one Japanese historiographical view regarding the war as a "Fifteen-Year War" (Jyugonen Sensō), covering the period beginning with the invasion of Manchuria through the atomic bombings, and including both the war in China and the Pacific war.

When the invasion of China proper began in earnest in July 1937 near Beijing, the Empire of Japan used "The North China Incident" (北支事變/華北事變, Hokushi Jihen/Kahoku Jihen), and with the outbreak of the Battle of Shanghai the following month, it was changed to "The China Incident" (支那事變, Shina Jihen). The word "incident" (事變, jihen) was used by Japan, as neither country had made a formal declaration of war at the outbreak of hostility. From the Japanese perspective, localizing these conflicts was beneficial in preventing intervention from other countries, particularly the United Kingdom and the United States, which were its primary source of petroleum and steel respectively. A formal expression of these conflicts would potentially lead to an American embargo in accordance with the Neutrality Acts of the 1930s. In addition, due to China's fractured political status, Japan often claimed that China was no longer a recognizable political entity on which war could be declared.

In Japanese propaganda, the invasion of China became a holy war (聖戦, seisen), the first step of the "eight corners of the world under one roof" slogan (八紘一宇, Hakkō ichiu). In 1940, Japanese prime minister Fumimaro Konoe launched the Taisei Yokusankai. When both sides formally declared war in December 1941, the name was replaced by "Greater East Asia War" (大東亞戰爭, Daitōa Sensō).

Although the Japanese government still uses the term "China Incident" in formal documents, the word Shina is considered derogatory by China and therefore the media in Japan often paraphrase with other expressions like "The Japan–China Incident" (日華事變/日支事變, Nikka Jiken/Nisshi Jiken), which were used by media as early as the 1930s. The name "Second Sino-Japanese War" is not commonly used in Japan as the China it fought a war against in 1894 to 1895 was led by the Qing dynasty, and thus is called the Qing-Japanese War (日清戦争, Nisshin–Sensō), rather than the First Sino-Japanese War.

== Background ==
=== Japanese expansion ===
The First Sino-Japanese War (1894–1895) concluded with the defeat of China, then under the rule of the Qing dynasty, by Japan. Under the Treaty of Shimonoseki, China was forced to cede Taiwan and recognize the full and complete independence of Korea. Japan also annexed the Senkaku Islands, which Japan claims were uninhabited, in early 1895 as a result of its victory at the end of the war. Japan had also attempted to annex the Liaodong Peninsula following the war, though was forced to return it to China following the Triple Intervention by France, Germany, and Russia.

In 1905, Japan defeated the Russian Empire in the Russo-Japanese War, gaining Dalian and southern Sakhalin and establishing a protectorate over Korea. In 1915, Japan issued the Twenty-One Demands to extort further political and commercial privilege from China, which was accepted by the regime of Yuan Shikai. Following World War I, Japan acquired the German Empire's sphere of influence in Shandong province, leading to nationwide anti-Japanese protests and mass demonstrations in China.

=== Warlord Era ===
The Qing dynasty was on the brink of collapse due to internal revolts and the imposition of the unequal treaties, while Japan had emerged as a great power through its efforts to modernize. In 1911, factions of the Qing Army uprose against the government, staging a revolution that swept across China's southern provinces. The Qing responded by appointing Yuan Shikai, commander of the loyalist Beiyang Army, as temporary prime minister in order to subdue the revolution. Yuan, wanting to remain in power, compromised with the revolutionaries, and agreed to abolish the monarchy and establish a new republican government, under the condition he be appointed president of China. The new Beiyang government of China was proclaimed in March 1912, after which Yuan Shikai began to amass power for himself. In 1913, the parliamentary political leader Song Jiaoren was assassinated; it is generally believed Yuan Shikai ordered the assassination.

Yuan Shikai then forced the parliament to pass a bill to strengthen the power of the president and sought to restore the imperial system, becoming the new emperor of China. However, there was little support for an imperial restoration among the general population, and protests and demonstrations soon broke out across the country. Yuan's attempts at restoring the monarchy triggered the National Protection War, and Yuan Shikai was overthrown after only a few months. In the aftermath of Shikai's death in June 1916, control of China fell into the hands of the Beiyang Army leadership.

The Beiyang government was a civilian government in name, but in practice it was a military dictatorship with a different warlord controlling each province of the country. China was reduced to a fractured state. As a result, China's prosperity began to wither and its economy declined. The country remained fragmented under the Beiyang Government and was unable to resist foreign incursions. This instability presented an opportunity for nationalistic politicians in Japan to press for territorial expansion.

=== Nationalist reunification ===
For the purpose of unifying China and defeating the regional warlords, the Kuomintang (KMT) in Guangzhou launched the Northern Expedition from 1926 to 1928 with limited assistance from the Soviet Union. The National Revolutionary Army (NRA) formed by the Kuomintang swept through southern and central China until it was checked in Shandong, where confrontations with the Japanese garrison escalated into armed conflict. The conflicts were collectively known as the Jinan incident of 1928, during which time the Japanese military killed several Chinese officials and fired artillery shells into Jinan. According to the investigation results of the Association of the Families of the Victims of the Jinan massacre, it showed that 6,123 Chinese civilians were killed and 1,701 injured. Relations between the Chinese Nationalist government and Japan severely worsened as a result of the Jinan incident.

Zhang Zuolin and his Fengtian clique, despite being supported by Japan, failed to defend against the National Revolutionary Army approaching Beijing. Zhang Zuolin decided to retreat back to Manchuria, where he was assassinated by the Kwantung Army in 1928. His son, Zhang Xueliang, took over as the leader of the Fengtian clique in Manchuria. Later in the same year, Zhang declared his allegiance to the Nationalist government in Nanjing under Chiang Kai-shek, and consequently, China was nominally reunified under one government.

=== Start of the Chinese Civil War ===
In 1930, the Central Plains War broke out across China, involving regional commanders who had fought in alliance with the Kuomintang during the Northern Expedition, and the Nanjing government under Chiang. The Chinese Communist Party (CCP) previously fought openly against the Nanjing government after the Shanghai massacre of 1927, and they continued to expand during this protracted civil war. The Kuomintang government focused its efforts on suppressing the Chinese Communists instead of opposing the Japanese. Chiang Kai-shek reasoned that only a unified command could resist foreign powers, leading to his defensive policy of "first internal pacification, then external resistance" (Chinese: 攘外必先安內), through its encirclement campaigns against the Communists.

Following the 1931 Mukden Incident, Nationalist planners identified critical vulnerabilities in the Kuomintang's urban-centric economic base, particularly the concentration of heavy industry in vulnerable coastal cities. Chiang Kai-shek's policy of 'internal pacification' was not just a military campaign against the communists, but also a major economic reorganization project. Recognizing that China lacked the industrial base for a localized total war in 1930, the Nationalist government sought to consolidate the southwestern interior as a strategic base while attempting to modernize the national currency and military before a full-scale confrontation with Japan became inevitable. To address these weaknesses, the central government initiated projects to modernize and solidify the Kuomintang's control over the national currency and industrial structure, while planning for the eventual redistribution of factories and arsenals to the interior.

Nationalist forces prioritized the destruction of Communist soviets, driving the CCP out of their enclaves and onto the Long March to Yan'an by 1934. On 1 August 1935, the Communist Party issued the August First Declaration. It called for the creation of a United Front of all Chinese parties, organizations, and people of all circles, including overseas Chinese and ethnic minorities, to oppose the Japanese. A December 1936 kidnapping by two Nationalist Generals, the Xi'an Incident, forced Chiang Kai-shek to hasten negotiations for a United Front with the Chinese Communists to oppose Japan, a process finalized at the outbreak of war.

== Pre-war events ==
=== Invasion of Manchuria ===
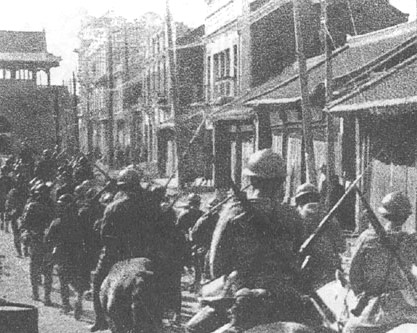
Japanese troops entering Shenyang during the Mukden Incident

The chronic warfare in China provided excellent opportunities for Japan, which saw Manchuria as a limitless supply of raw materials, a market for its manufactured goods (now excluded from the markets of many Western countries as a result of Depression-era tariffs), and a protective buffer state against the Soviet Union in Siberia. As a result, the Japanese Army was widely prevalent in Manchuria immediately following the Japanese victory in the Russo-Japanese War in 1905, where Japan gained control over the South Manchuria Railway Zone and the Kwantung Leased Territory in Manchuria.

As a result of their strengthened position, by 1915 Japan had negotiated a significant amount of economic privilege in the region by pressuring Yuan Shikai, the president of the Republic of China at the time. With a widened range of economic privileges in Manchuria, Japan began focusing on developing and protecting matters of economic interests. This included railroads, businesses, natural resources, and a general control of the territory. The Japanese Kwantung Army was established in 1919 to protect these interests. Both the 1921 and 1927 Imperial Eastern Region Conferences reconfirmed Japan's commitment to be the dominant power in the Northeast.

While the Japanese Army initially justified its presence by stating that it was simply protecting its own economic interests, militarists in the army began pushing for an expansion of influence, leading to the Kwangtung Army assassinating the warlord of Manchuria, Zhang Zuolin, on 4 June 1928. This bombing of Zhang's train was carried out by officers on their own initiative and stood in direct opposition to the Tanaka cabinet's official policy of maintaining good relations with Zhang, illustrating the growing autonomy and civilian-military divide.

Following Zhang's death, his son Zhang Xueliang succeeded him, and aligned with Chiang Kai-shek's Nanjing government through the Northeast Flag Replacement in December 1928, symbolically unifying China. In July 1929, Zhang Xueliang moved to assert Chinese sovereignty by ousting Soviet employees from the Chinese Eastern Railway (CER), provoking the five-month-long Sino-Soviet conflict (1929). The Soviet Red Army forces decisively defeated Zhang's Northeastern Army, resulting in the resumption of Soviet control over the railway and the severing of diplomatic relations between Nanjing and Moscow. For Kwantung Army officers, the conflict demonstrated the military vulnerability of the northeastern warlord forces. The conflict shook Japanese policy to the core and reopened the Manchurian problem. By 1930, the Kwantung Army realized they faced a Red Army that was only growing stronger. The time to act was drawing near and Japanese plans to conquer the Northeast were accelerated. The subsequent instability and the erosion of Soviet influence during the Great Depression left a power vacuum in Manchuria that the Kwantung Army sought to exploit.

Kwantung Army Colonels Seishirō Itagaki and Kanji Ishiwara independently decided to provoke the invasion of Manchuria with the Mukden incident in September 1931. Kwantung Army soldiers set off a bomb on the South Manchuria Railway in order to provoke an opportunity to act in "self defense". Japan believed its rights in Manchuria, which had been established as a result of its victory in 1905 at the end of the Russo-Japanese War, had been systematically violated and there were "more than 120 cases of infringement of rights and interests, interference with business, boycott of Japanese goods, unreasonable taxation, detention of individuals, confiscation of properties, eviction, demand for cessation of business, assault and battery, and the oppression of Korean residents".

After five months of fighting, Japan successfully occupied all of Manchuria, to the surprise of many. Ishiwara himself expected to be arrested for insubordination, but instead was praised for his success. He invented the Concordia Association to establish the puppet state of Manchukuo as an independent country. The last Emperor of China, Puyi, was installed as its puppet ruler. Militarily too weak to challenge Japan directly, China appealed to the League of Nations for help. The League's investigation led to the publication of the Lytton Report, condemning Japan for its incursion into Manchuria, causing Japan to withdraw from the League of Nations. No country took action against Japan beyond tepid censure.

=== Sporadic Japanese encroachment ===
From 1931 until summer 1937, the Nationalist Army under Chiang Kai-shek did little to oppose Japanese encroachment into China However, Chiang had recognized the incoming threat of a Japanese invasion, and had secretly begun war preparations since 1932, such as creating the National Defense Planning Council, recruiting German military advisors, and purchasing foreign arms.

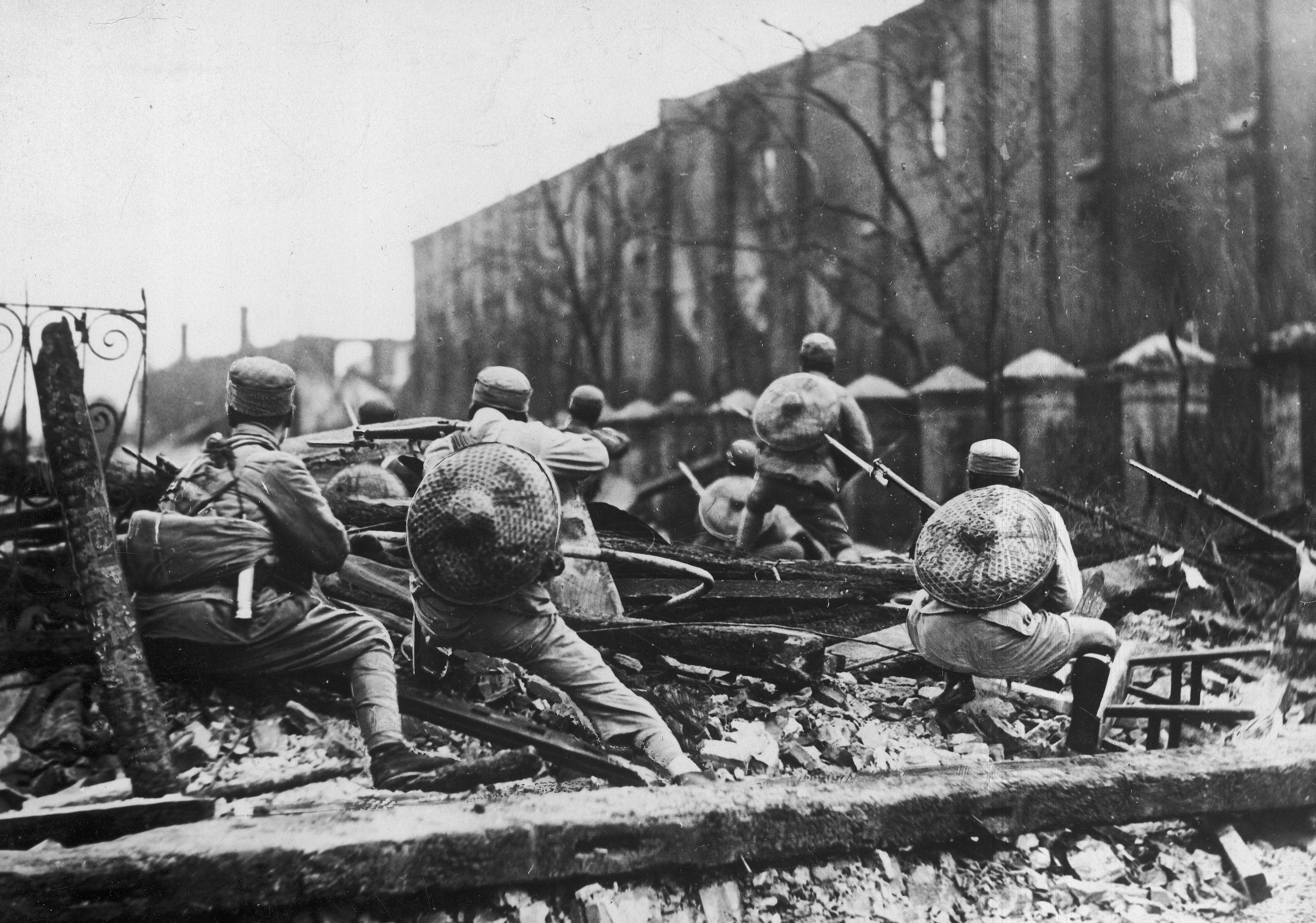
Chinese troops hold defensive positions in Shanghai, January 1932.

Incessant fighting followed the Mukden Incident. In 1932, Chinese and Japanese troops clashed in Shanghai during the 28 January battle. This resulted in the demilitarization of Shanghai, which forbade the Chinese to deploy troops in their own city. In Manchukuo, there was an ongoing campaign to pacify the Anti-Japanese Volunteer Armies that arose from widespread outrage over the policy of non-resistance to Japan. On 15 April 1932, the Chinese Soviet Republic led by the Communists declared war on Japan.

Under Chi Shi-ying and his protégé Lo Ta-yu's leadership, the Kuomintang also established the Northeast Anti-Manchukuo and Anti-Japanese Association as well as the September 18th Alliance. These organizations developed an extensive underground intelligence network and coordinated anti-Japanese activities in Manchuria.

In 1933, the Japanese attacked the Great Wall region. The Tanggu Truce established in its aftermath, gave Japan control of Rehe Province, as well as a demilitarized zone between the Great Wall and Beijing-Tianjin region. Japan aimed to create another buffer zone between Manchukuo and the Chinese Nationalist government in Nanjing. Japan increasingly exploited China's internal conflicts to reduce the strength of its fractious opponents.

Even years after the Northern Expedition, the political power of the Nationalist government was limited to just the area of the Yangtze River Delta. Other sections of China were essentially in the hands of local Chinese warlords. Japan sought various Chinese collaborators and helped them establish governments friendly to Japan. This policy was called the Specialization of North China (華北特殊化; huáběitèshūhùa), more commonly known as the North China Autonomous Movement. The northern provinces affected by this policy were Chahar, Suiyuan, Hebei, Shanxi, and Shandong.

This Japanese policy was most effective in the area of what is now Inner Mongolia and Hebei. In 1935, under Japanese pressure, China signed the He–Umezu Agreement, which forbade the KMT to conduct party operations in Hebei. In the same year, the Chin–Doihara Agreement was signed expelling the KMT from Chahar.

Thus, by the end of 1935 the Chinese government had essentially abandoned northern China. In its place, the Japanese-backed East Hebei Autonomous Council and the Hebei–Chahar Political Council were established. There in the empty space of Chahar the Mongol military government was formed on 12 May 1936. Japan provided all the necessary military and economic aid. Afterwards Chinese volunteer forces continued to resist Japanese aggression in Manchuria, and Chahar and Suiyuan.

=== Continued negotiations ===
The viability of a Sino-Japanese partnership, initially pursued by Kōki Hirota and Chinese Premier Wang Jingwei, deteriorated rapidly due to domestic political developments in late 1935. In November 1935, the Nationalist government carried out a major currency reform, abandoning the silver standard in favor of the managed Chinese National Currency. Backed by Great Britain and championed by Finance Minister H. H. Kung (a prominent member of China's pro-Western faction), the reform reduced Japanese economic leverage over China's northern provinces. Concurrently, Nanjing's primary advocates for negotiations with Japan were effectively removed from the political landscape: an assassination attempt in November forced Wang Jingwei's resignation, while key diplomats were lost when Huang Fu retired and Tang Youren was assassinated in December.

The establishment of the Japanese-aligned East Hebei Autonomous Government under Yin Ruguang had incited the December 9th Movement, rallying Chinese public opinion against Japan. Despite these setbacks, the pro-appeasement alignment remained influential within the Nationalist government, supported by the official Kuomintang policy of delaying conflict to buy time under what Chiang called, "first internal pacification, then external resistance." General Song Zheyuan's local appeasement strategy in the north led to the establishment of the Hebei–Chahar Political Council.

By 1936, the failure of the North China Buffer State Strategy to create Japanese diplomatic leverage and the fallout of the February 26 coup attempt in Tokyo opened the door for more negotiations. The Japanese Army High Command aligned with the civilian government favored direct diplomatic negotiations with Nanjing, moving away from the use of regional proxies. Satō Naotake, the Japanese foreign minister in the Hayashi cabinet, strived to end the buffer state strategy and treat China as an equal to avoid war.

Concurrently, the Chinese Communist Party capitalized on anti-Japanese sentiment and Chinese nationalism, advocating for a nationwide ceasefire and resistance. This demand gained significant popular support, as a ceasefire would halt Chiang Kai-shek's anti-communist encirclement campaigns. During the Kawagoe-Chang Chun negotiations in the fall of 1936, Japanese Ambassador Shigeru Kawagoe attempted to secure anti-communist cooperation, but Chinese Foreign Minister Zhang Qun adopted a firmer stance, demanding the dissolution of the East Hebei Autonomous Government and an end to smuggling as preconditions for normalization.

== Course of the war ==
=== 1937: Outbreak of full-scale war ===
On the night of 7 July 1937, Chinese and Japanese troops exchanged fire in the vicinity of the Marco Polo (or Lugou) Bridge about 16 km from Beijing. The initial confused and sporadic skirmishing was escalated into the first full-scale battle weeks later. However, negotiations continued even past the Battle of Shanghai with the Trautmann mediation and Nine Power Treaty Conference. Total war only commenced after the Battle of Nanking, when Fumimaro Konoe declared that Japan would no longer negotiate with Chiang Kai-Shek. Unlike Japan, China was unprepared for total war and had little military-industrial strength, no mechanized divisions, and few armoured forces. Soon after 1937, local Chinese guerilla forces organized spontaneously. These typically joined either the Communist or Nationalist forces. Within the first year of full-scale war, Japanese forces obtained victories in most major Chinese cities.

==== Marco Polo Bridge incident ====
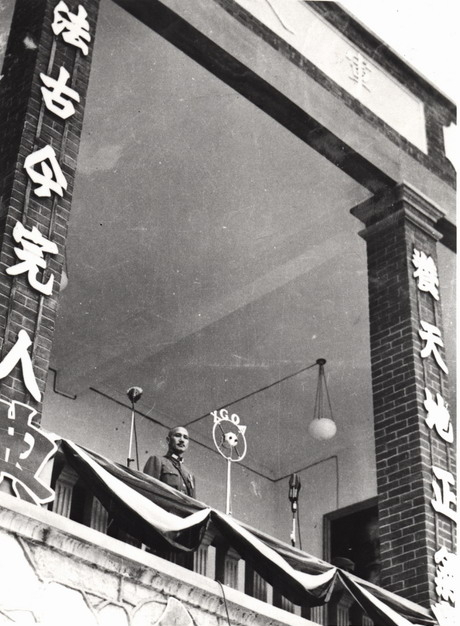
Chiang Kai-shek announced the Kuomintang policy of resistance against Japan at Lushan on 10 July 1937, three days after the Marco Polo Bridge Incident.

On 7 July, units of the Japanese China Garrison Army crossed the border to conduct military exercises at night, claiming Private Shimura Kikujiro went missing and demanded entry to the walled city of Wanping. The Chinese garrison of the 29th Army refused. Fire was exchanged in the confusion. The question of "who fired first" and provoked the incident is highly contested, and the exact cause of this incident remains unknown. Despite the initial fighting, a ceasefire was negotiated on 11 July in Beijing. The local Japanese military and General Qin Dechun agreed to a settlement: an apology, the withdrawal of Chinese troops from Wanping, and better control of "communists" in the area.

However, news of the ceasefire failed to reach the central military command of either China or Japan immediately, and both grew increasingly concerned. Chiang Kai-shek had ordered four Central Army divisions to move into Hebei, even though this violated the He–Umezu Agreement. The following day, the Konoe cabinet held the Five Ministers Conference, where the Imperial Japanese Army General Staff approved a plan that authorized the deployment of three infantry divisions from mainland Japan. Major General Ishiwara tried to oppose the plan as he advocated a policy of non-expansion, but eventually agreed as "to be prepared for any contingency if the situation becomes strained". Although the eventual news of the ceasefire prevented outright war, the arrival of new divisions and the resulting confusion caused tensions to rise. Military cable lines were constantly severed during the tensions.

Since October 1936, Moscow had continuously proposed a mutual security pact with China, but the deal was never accepted, even after the December 1936 Xi'an Incident. On 5 June 1937, Soviet leader Joseph Stalin again proposed a mutual security pact to China, but Foreign Minister Wang Chonghui only submitted it to Chiang a day after the Marco Polo Bridge Incident. Chiang immediately tried to accept the mutual security offer, but by then the USSR considered it too late and instead proposed a non-aggression pact. On 16 July, U.S. Secretary of State Cordell Hull issued a public statement of principles advocating for the "sanctity of treaties" and the "abstinence by all nations from use of force." Chiang Kai-shek had been closely monitoring Western reactions, and relied on a long-term strategy of obtaining support from the League of Nations and the world at large to punish Japan. However, as American policy followed what Hull summed up as "keeping this country out of war," the diplomatic signals were intentionally vague to retain impartiality.

The CCP's formal declaration for KMT-CCP cooperation was drafted by Zhou Enlai on 4 July 1937 and sent to the Nationalist government on 15 July, though it was not published until 22 September, solidifying the basis for a Second United Front.

On 17 July, Chiang Kai-shek delivered the Lushan Statement, framing the incident as a struggle for the nation's survival and declaring that China had reached its "limit of endurance." Chiang outlined his demands for peace to Japan, including that the 29th Army be allowed to move freely in the area. This statement essentially transformed the local incident into a national cause of resistance. Although Chiang was ready to accept the local ceasefire, he slowed the withdrawal from the area to gauge international response. On 25 July, the Langfang Incident occurred when Chinese troops engaged a Japanese communication repair unit. On 26 July, the Guanganmen Incident saw Japanese troops fired upon while attempting to enter Peiping's city gates to protect Japanese nationals. These incidents led the Japanese China Garrison Army to abandon diplomatic efforts and launch a military invasion.

==== Beiping–Tianjin campaign ====
On 28 July 1937, the IJA 20th Division and three independent combined brigades launched an offensive against the Chinese 29th Army. The battle involved little combat within Beiping itself, as General Song Zheyuan ordered a general withdrawal of the 29th Army to avoid its total destruction. The Japanese captured the city on 29 July after the Chinese forces withdrew, and majority of intense fighting occurred at Tianjin. The Taku Forts at Tianjin fell on 30 July, concluding the campaign.

The Japanese Army had been given orders not to advance further than the Yongding River. The Konoe government's foreign minister opened negotiations with Chiang Kai-shek's government in Nanjing and stated: "Japan wants Chinese cooperation, not Chinese land." After the Tongzhou mutiny on 29 July, Chinese soldiers assigned to a Japanese-backed puppet government mutinied and killed approximately 200 Japanese and Korean civilians. This inflamed anti-Chinese sentiments in Japan, convinced many in the military that escalation in China was necessary.

==== Diplomatic maneuvering ====
On 6 August 1937, Soviet Ambassador Ivan Maisky reportedly assured Chinese officials that if the United States, England, and France offered mediation and Japan rejected it, "the Soviet Union would go to war on the side of China." Chiang Kai-shek, bolstered by these continued Russian promises of armed assistance, "personally wished to fight" rather than accept a diplomatic compromise with Japan.

Foreign Minister Kōki Hirota attempted to bring the conflict to a close through the "Funatsu Operation" in early August. Entrusted to Funatsu Tatsuichirō, former consul-general in Shanghai, the plan aimed to negotiate a ceasefire directly with Gao Zongwu, head of the Nationalist foreign ministry's Asian Affairs Bureau, by having Gao submit a Chinese ceasefire proposal to Japanese Ambassador Shigeru Kawagoe. The Japanese terms conveyed by Hirota included establishing a demilitarized zone from Beiping to Tianjin, concluding a Sino-Japanese anti-communist pact, and securing a Chinese promise to not make the existence of Manchukuo an issue in the future. Hirota believed these conditions were highly generous and would be well-received by Nanjing and the international community. However, historians note that the Chinese government viewed these terms as unacceptable because they required severe political concessions. Funatsu contacted Gao on 9 August, but the talks were immediately halted that evening by the Ōyama Incident, when two Japanese naval personnel were killed in Shanghai. Talks officially collapsed on 13 August when the Battle of Shanghai erupted, and the personnel of the Japanese consulate in Nanjing were subsequently withdrawn on 14 August.

==== Battle of Shanghai ====
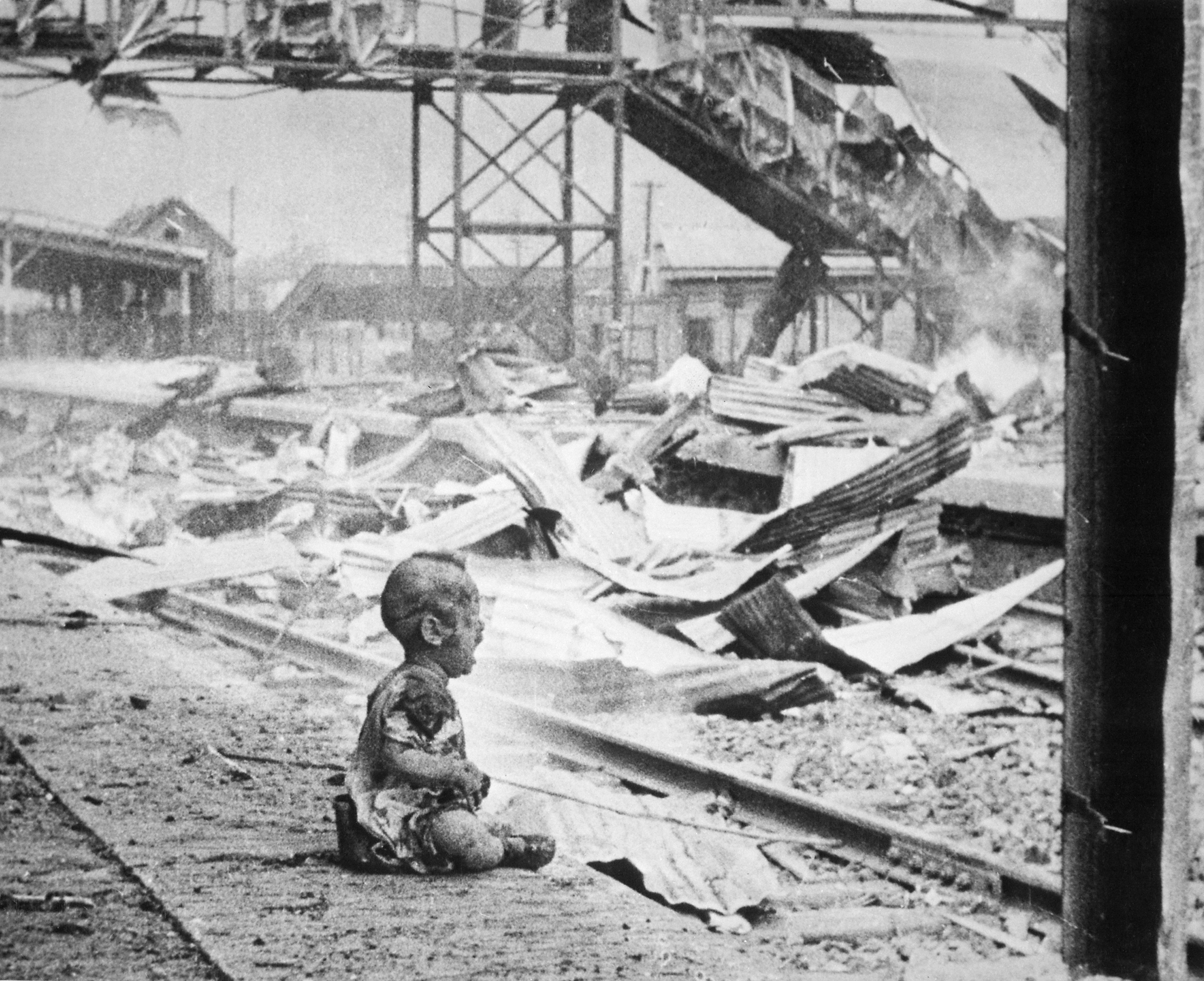
A baby sits in the remains of the Shanghai South railway station on 'Bloody Saturday', 1937

The Imperial General Headquarters (GHQ) in Tokyo was content with the gains acquired in northern China following the Marco Polo Bridge Incident, and initially showed reluctance to escalate the conflict into a full-scale war. However, the situation in Shanghai reached a breaking point on 9 August 1937, when the Ōyama Incident occurred with the shooting of two Japanese officers who were attempting to enter the Hongqiao military airport. The Japanese demanded that all Chinese forces withdraw from Shanghai; the Chinese outright refused to meet this demand.

In response, both the Chinese and the Japanese marched reinforcements into the Shanghai area. Chiang concentrated his best troops north of Shanghai in an effort to impress the city's large foreign community and increase China's foreign support. On 13 August 1937, Kuomintang soldiers attacked Japanese Marine positions in Shanghai, with Japanese army troops and marines in turn crossing into the city with naval gunfire support at Zhabei, leading to the Battle of Shanghai. On 14 August, Chinese forces under the command of Zhang Zhizhong were ordered to capture or destroy the Japanese strongholds in Shanghai, leading to bitter street fighting.

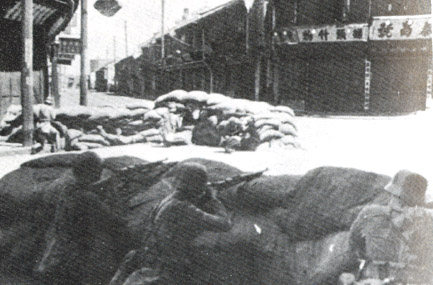
German-trained National Revolutionary Army, 88th Division, defending a street intersection, Shanghai, 1937.

Chiang Kai-shek and his generals were influenced by assurances from Soviet Ambassador Dmitry Bogomolov, who had promised that China could expect support from the Soviet Union if it undertook armed resistance. The Sino-Soviet Non-Aggression Pact was signed on 21 August and soon, the USSR delivered military aid through Operation Zet, including aircraft, tanks, equipment, and military advisors. However, the Soviet Union never directly intervened in the war as Chiang had hoped.

In late August, the Japanese Army landed reinforcements in northern Shanghai. Chinese commanders quickly rushed forces to counter the landings, resulting in heavy fighting including trench and urban warfare. Both sides suffered high casualty rates in the attrition.

As the battle in Shanghai continued, Japan advanced along railway lines in the North, until they reached Jinan and the Yellow River. Alongside Mengjiang forces, Japan invaded Taiyuan and the North China area. By 26 October, the IJA had captured Dachang, a key strong-point within Shanghai, and on 5 November, additional reinforcements from Japan landed in Hangzhou Bay behind Chinese lines. On 9 November, the 10th Army reinforced Hangzhou Bay, and the NRA began a general retreat. The Imperial Japanese Army (IJA) ultimately committed over 300,000 troops, along with numerous naval vessels and aircraft, to capture the city. After more than three months of intense fighting, their casualties far exceeded initial expectations. Japan did not immediately occupy the Shanghai International Settlement or the Shanghai French Concession, areas which were outside of China's control due to the treaty port system. Japan moved into these areas after its 1941 declaration of war against the United States and the United Kingdom.

==== Fall of Nanjing and massacre ====
Following the Battle of Shanghai, the Army General Staff imposed an "operation restriction line" up to the cities of Suzhou and Jiaxing with the aim of ending the war. Konoe's government presented peace terms to Chiang Kai-shek through the Trautmann Mediation. These term included no demands for territorial annexation, but rather requirements for economic cooperation and an anti-communist pact. Chiang may have been encouraged to hold out in hopes of a Western intervention, after U.S. President Franklin D. Roosevelt delivered his Quarantine Speech in Chicago on 5 October, advocating for an international quarantine of aggressor nations. Japan was invited to the Nine Power Treaty Conference in Brussels, but this was denied by Hirota who believed it would 'merely result in bolstering up China and in prolonging rather than shortening the warfare.' While Chiang secretly hoped for FDR to take action to immediately end the war with Japan, the conference ultimately failed to impose sanctions on Japan,.

The Japanese military's non-expansion policy was discarded when Japanese generals disobeyed orders and began to pursue retreating Chinese forces past the restriction line on 19 November, aiming to encircle Nanjing. The Japanese Army General Staff then authorized the capture of Nanjing on 28 November 1937, to force a conclusion to the conflict.

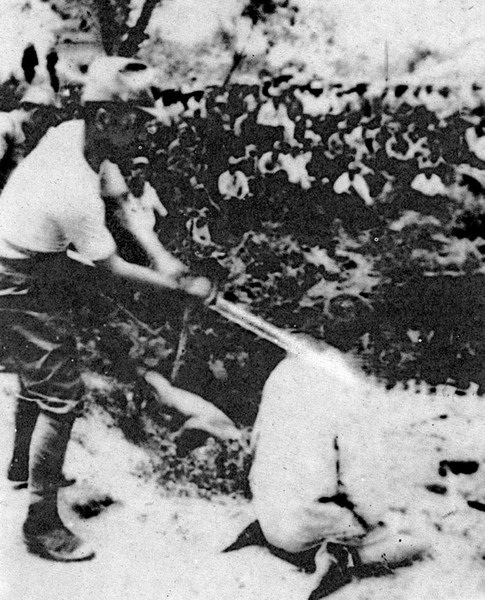
A Chinese POW about to be beheaded by a Japanese officer with a shin gunto

In November 1937, the Japanese concentrated 220,000 soldiers and began a campaign against Nanjing. Building on the hard-won victory in Shanghai, the IJA advanced on and captured the KMT capital city of Nanjing (December 1937) and Northern Shanxi (September – November 1937).

Japanese forces inflicted heavy casualties on the Chinese soldiers defending the city, killing approximately 50,000 of them including 17 Chinese generals. Upon the capture of Nanjing, Japanese committed massive war atrocities including mass murder and rape of Chinese civilians after 13 December 1937, which has been referred to as the Nanjing Massacre. Over the next several weeks, Japanese troops perpetrated numerous mass executions and tens of thousands of rapes. The army looted and burned the surrounding towns and the city, destroying more than a third of the buildings. The number of Chinese killed in the massacre has been subject to much debate, with estimates ranging from 100,000 to more than 300,000. The numbers agreed upon by most scholars are provided by the International Military Tribunal for the Far East, which estimate at least 200,000 murders and 20,000 rapes.

The Japanese atrocities in Nanjing, especially following the Chinese defense of Shanghai, increased international goodwill for the Chinese people and the Chinese government. The Nationalist government re-established itself in Chongqing, which became the wartime seat of government until 1945. Following the capture of Nanjing, Chiang Kai-shek was now willing to accept Japan's initial proposal. However, the Japanese government hardened its terms drastically with the inclusion of the recognition of Manchukuo. Peace negotiations broke down and Chiang Kai-shek failed to respond by the 12 January 1938 deadline. Prime Minister Konoe issued the First Konoe Statement on 16 January 1938, declaring: "We will no longer deal with the government of Chiang Kai-shek." This effectively severed relations and committed Japan to a total war of regime change.

==== Xinjiang rebellion ====
In 1937, then pro-Soviet General Sheng Shicai invaded Dunganistan accompanied by Soviet troops to defeat General Ma Hushan of the KMT 36th Division. General Ma expected help from Nanjing, but did not receive it. The Nationalist government was forced to deny these maneuvers as "Japanese propaganda", as it needed continued military supplies from the Soviets.

=== 1938: Strategic retreat ===
By January 1938, most conventional Kuomintang forces had either been defeated or no longer offered major resistance to Japanese advances. KMT forces won a few victories in 1938 (the Battle of Taierzhuang and the Battle of Wanjialing) but were generally ineffective that year. By March 1938, the Japanese controlled almost all of North China. Communist-led rural resistance to the Japanese remained active, however. Following the fall of Shanghai and Nanjing in late 1937, the Nationalist military command began a war of attrition known as "trading space for time" (以空間換時間). By gradually withdrawing into China's vast interior and establishing the rugged southwestern province of Sichuan as a final defensive base, the Kuomintang intended to over-extend Japanese supply lines while reconstituting its depleted central armies.

By late 1938, Japanese forces controlled China's main coastal cities and major railway lines.

==== Xuzhou and Wuhan ====
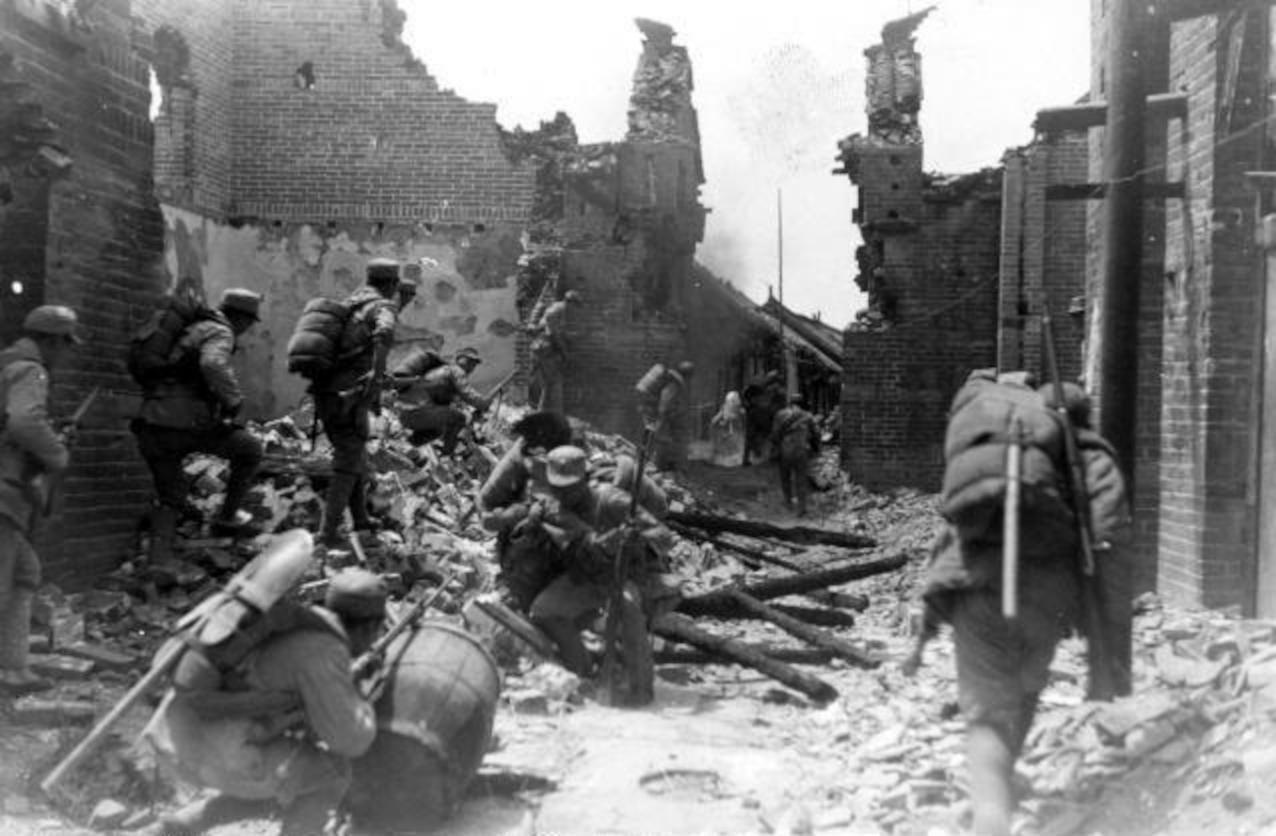
Chinese soldiers in urban warfare in the Battle of Taierzhuang, March–April 1938

With many victories achieved, Japanese field generals escalated the war in Jiangsu in an attempt to wipe out the Chinese forces in the area. The Japanese managed to overcome Chinese resistance around Bengbu and the Teng xian, but were fought to a halt at Linyi. The Japanese were then decisively defeated at the Battle of Taierzhuang (March–April 1938), where the Chinese used night attacks and close-quarters combat to overcome Japanese advantages in firepower. The Chinese also severed Japanese supply lines from the rear, forcing the Japanese to retreat in the first Chinese victory of the war. The Japanese then attempted to surround and destroy the Chinese armies in the Xuzhou region with an enormous pincer movement. However the majority of the Chinese forces, some 200,000–300,000 troops in 40 divisions, managed to break out of the encirclement and retreat to defend Wuhan, the Japanese's next target.

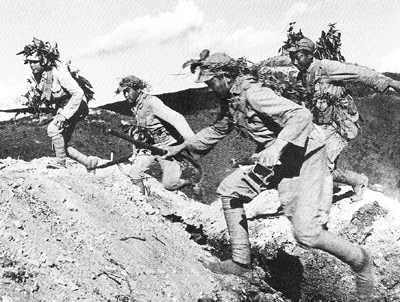
Chinese troops advancing near Wanjialing

Following Xuzhou, the IJA changed its strategy and deployed almost all of its existing armies in China to attack the city of Wuhan, which had become the political, economic and military center of China, in hopes of destroying the fighting strength of the NRA and forcing the KMT government to negotiate for peace. On 6 June, they captured Kaifeng, the capital of Henan, and threatened to take Zhengzhou, the junction of the Pinghan and Longhai railways. The Japanese forces, numbering some 400,000 men, were faced by over 1 million NRA troops in the Central Yangtze region. Having learned from their defeats at Shanghai and Nanjing, the Chinese had adapted themselves to fight the Japanese and managed to check their forces on many fronts, slowing and sometimes reversing the Japanese advances, as in the case of Wanjialing. To overcome Chinese resistance, Japanese forces frequently deployed poison gas and committed atrocities against civilians, such as a "mini-Nanjing Massacre" in the city of Jiujiang upon its capture. After four months of intense combat, the Nationalists were forced to abandon Wuhan by October, and its government and armies retreated to Chongqing. Both sides had suffered tremendous casualties in the battle, with the Chinese losing up to 500,000 soldiers killed or wounded, and the Japanese up to 200,000.

==== Yellow River flood ====
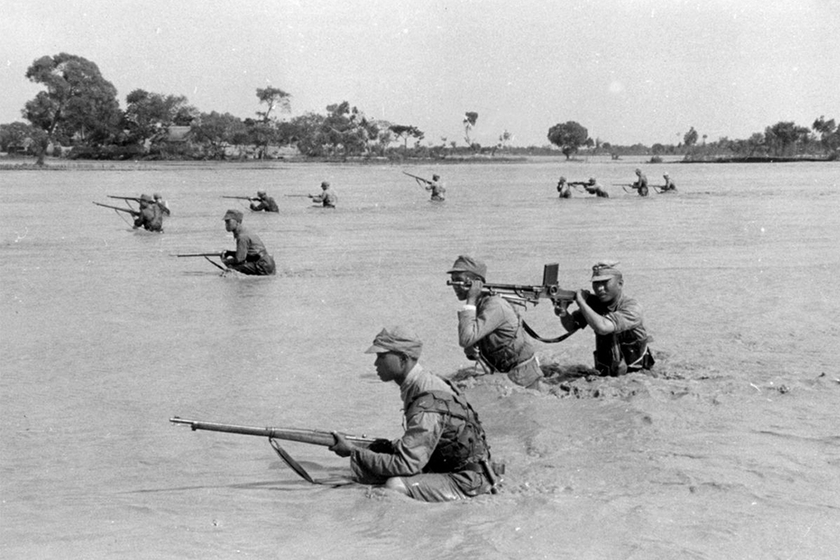
National Revolutionary Army soldiers during the 1938 Yellow River flood

A map of the flooded area in 1938

The 1938 Yellow River flood (simplified Chinese: 花园口决堤事件; traditional Chinese: 花園口決堤事件; pinyin: Huāyuánkǒu Juédī Shìjiàn; lit. 'Huayuankou Dam Burst Incident') was a man-made flood in China from June 1938 to January 1947 created by the intentional destruction of levees on the Yellow River in Huayuankou, Henan, by the National Revolutionary Army (NRA) during the Second Sino-Japanese War. The first wave of floods hit Zhongmu County on 13 June 1938.

NRA commanders intended the flood to act as a scorched earth defensive line against the Imperial Japanese Armed Forces. There were three long-term strategic intentions behind the decision to cause the flooding: firstly, the flood in Henan safeguarded the Guanzhong section of the Longhai railway, a major northwestern route used by the Soviet Union to send supplies to the NRA from August 1937 to March 1941. Secondly, the flooding of significant portions of land and railway sections made it difficult for the Japanese military to enter Shaanxi, thereby preventing them from invading the Sichuan basin, where the Chinese wartime capital of Chongqing and China's southwestern home front were located. Thirdly, the floods in Henan and Anhui destroyed much of the tracks and bridges of the Beijing–Wuhan railway, the Tianjin–Pukou railway and the Longhai railway, thereby preventing the Japanese from effectively moving their forces across Northern and Central China. In the short term, the NRA aimed to use the flood to halt the rapid transit of Japanese units from Northern China to areas near Wuhan.

=== 1939–1941: Stalemate ===
After the fall of Wuhan and Guangzhou to the Japanese, a period of costly stalemate began.

==== Chinese counter-offensives ====
By 1939, the Nationalist army had withdrawn to the southwest and northwest of China and the Japanese controlled the coastal cities that had been centres of Nationalist power. From 1939 to 1945, China was divided into three regions: Japanese-occupied territories (Lunxianqu), the Nationalist-controlled region (Guotongqu), and the Communist-controlled regions (Jiefangqu, or liberated areas). During this period, the main Chinese objective was to drag out the war for as long as possible in a war of attrition, thereby exhausting Japanese resources while it was building up China's military capacity. American general Joseph Stilwell called this strategy "winning by outlasting".

From the beginning of 1939, the war entered a new phase with the unprecedented defeat of the Japanese at Battle of Suixian–Zaoyang and First Battle of Changsha. General Ma Biao also led Hui, Salar and Dongxiang cavalry to defeat the Japanese at the Battle of Huaiyang in the summer of 1939. In 1939, Mao Zedong wrote The Greatest Crisis under Current Conditions, calling for more active resistance against Japan and for the strengthening of the Second United Front. The Chinese launched their first large-scale counter-offensive against the IJA in December 1939; however, due to its low military-industrial capacity and limited experience in modern warfare, this offensive was defeated. Afterwards Chiang could not risk any more all-out offensive campaigns given the poorly trained, under-equipped, and disorganized state of his armies and opposition to his leadership both within the Kuomintang and in China in general. He had lost a substantial portion of his best trained and equipped troops in the Battle of Shanghai and was at times unable to command his generals effectively, who maintained a high degree of autonomy from the central KMT government.

In 1940, the Chinese Red Army launched a major offensive in north China, destroying railways and a major coal mine. After 1940, the Japanese encountered tremendous difficulties in administering and garrisoning the seized territories, and tried to solve their occupation problems by implementing a strategy of creating friendly puppet governments favourable to Japanese interests in the territories conquered. This included prominently the regime headed by Wang Jingwei, one of Chiang's rivals in the KMT. However, atrocities committed by the Imperial Japanese Army, as well as Japanese refusal to delegate any real power, left the puppet state very unpopular and largely ineffective. The only success the Japanese had was to recruit a large Collaborationist Chinese Army to maintain public security in the occupied areas. By 1941, Japan occupied most of the eastern coastal areas of China and Vietnam, though guerrilla fighting continued in these areas. Japan had suffered high casualties resulting from unexpectedly stubborn Chinese resistance, and neither side could make any swift progress in the manner of Nazi Germany in western Europe.

By 1943, Guangdong had experienced famine. As the situation worsened, Chinese in New York received a letter stating that 600,000 people died in Siyi by starvation. Local Chinese resistance forces, organized separately by both the CCP and the KMT, continued their resistance in occupied areas to make Japanese administration over the vast land area of China difficult.

==== Three Alls Policy ====
Japan had occupied much of north and coastal China by the end of 1941, but the KMT central government and military had retreated to the western interior to continue their resistance, while the Chinese communists remained in control of base areas in Shaanxi. From 1941 to 1942, Japan concentrated most of its forces in China in an effort to defeat the CCP bases behind Japan's lines. Aiming to decrease the Communists' human and material resources, the Japanese military implemented the Three Alls Policy ("Kill all, loot all, burn all").

In accordance with the policy, Japanese forces conducted massacres, slavery, deportations and mass rape across North and Central China. They destroyed numerous villages, deployed poison gas, and weaponized forced starvation against the rural countryside. These measures killed millions of Chinese civilians, but had a marginal effect on guerrilla activity. These destructive campaigns would persist until March 1945.

==== Formation and collapse of the United Front ====
After the Mukden Incident in 1931, Chinese public opinion was strongly critical of Manchuria's leader, the "young marshal" Zhang Xueliang, for his non-resistance to the Japanese invasion, even though the Kuomintang central government was also responsible for this policy, giving Zhang an order to improvise while not offering support. After losing Manchuria to the Japanese, Zhang and his Northeast Army were given the duty of suppressing the Red Army in Shaanxi after their Long March. This resulted in great casualties for his Northeast Army, which received no support in manpower or weaponry from Chiang Kai-shek. In the Xi'an Incident on 12 December 1936, Zhang Xueliang kidnapped Chiang Kai-shek in Xi'an, hoping to force an end to KMT–CCP conflict. Joseph Stalin, who viewed Chiang Kai-Shek as a crucial asset to the defense of his eastern borders, forced the CCP to negotiate with the KMT. To secure the release of Chiang, the KMT agreed to a temporary ceasefire with the Communists.

On 24 December, the two parties verbally agreed to a United Front against Japan. The beleaguered Communists agreed to form the New Fourth Army and the 8th Route Army under the nominal control of the NRA. In addition, Shaan-Gan-Ning and Shanxi-Chahar-Hebei border regions were created, under the control of the CCP. In Shaan-Gan-Ning, Communists in the Shaan-Gan-Ning Base Area fostered opium production, taxed it, and engaged in its trade—including selling to Japanese-occupied and KMT-controlled provinces. The Red Army fought alongside KMT forces during the Battle of Taiyuan, and the high point of their cooperation came in 1938 during the Battle of Wuhan. The formation of a united front fostered the legitimacy of the CCP, but the level of support the central government would provide to the communists was not settled. When compromise with the CCP failed to incentivize the Soviet Union to engage in an open conflict against Japan, the KMT withheld further support for the Communists. To strengthen their legitimacy, Communist forces actively engaged the Japanese early on. These operations weakened Japanese forces in Shanxi and other areas in the North.

Mao Zedong was distrustful of Chiang Kai-shek, however, and shifted strategy to guerrilla warfare in order to preserve the CCP's military strength. Despite Japan's steady territorial gains in northern China, the coastal regions, and the rich Yangtze River Valley in central China, the distrust between the two antagonists was scarcely veiled. The uneasy alliance began to break down by late 1938, partially due to the Communists' aggressive efforts to expand their military strength by absorbing Chinese guerrilla forces behind Japanese lines. Chinese militia who refused to switch their allegiance were often labelled "collaborators" and attacked by CCP forces. For example, the Red Army led by He Long attacked and wiped out a brigade of Chinese militia led by Zhang Yin-wu in Hebei in June 1939. Starting in 1940, open conflict between Nationalists and Communists became more frequent in the occupied areas outside of Japanese control, culminating in the New Fourth Army Incident in January 1941.

Afterwards, the Second United Front completely broke down and Chinese Communists leader Mao Zedong outlined the preliminary plan for the CCP's eventual seizure of power from Chiang Kai-shek. Mao himself is quoted outlining the "7-2-1" policy, saying "We are fighting 70 percent for self development, 20 percent for compromise, and 10 percent against Japan". Mao began his final push for consolidation of CCP power under his authority during the Yan'an Rectification Movement, and his teachings became the central tenets of the CCP doctrine that came to be formalized as Mao Zedong Thought. The Communists also began to focus most of their energy on building up their sphere of influence wherever opportunities were presented, mainly through rural mass organizations, administrative, land and tax reform measures favouring poor peasants; while the Nationalists attempted to neutralize the spread of Communist influence by military blockade of areas controlled by CCP and fighting the Japanese at the same time. In April 1941, Soviet aid to China halted with the Soviet–Japanese Neutrality Pact. The CCP formally stated that the pact was "a great victory for Soviet diplomacy" and "was beneficial to liberation throughout China."

==== Northwest resistance ====
Japan attempted to reach out to Chinese ethnic minorities in order to rally them to their side against the Han Chinese, but only succeeded with certain Manchu, Mongol, Uyghur, and Tibetan elements. The Japanese attempt to get the Muslim Hui people on their side failed, as many Chinese generals such as Bai Chongxi, Ma Hongbin, Ma Hongkui, and Ma Bufang were Hui. The Japanese attempted to approach Ma Bufang but were unsuccessful in making any agreement with him. Ma Bufang ended up supporting the anti-Japanese Imam Hu Songshan, who prayed for the destruction of the Japanese.

Ma became chairman (governor) of Qinghai in 1938 and commanded a group army. He was appointed because of his anti-Japanese inclinations, and was such an obstruction to Japanese agents trying to contact the Tibetans that he was called an "adversary" by a Japanese agent. During the offensive, Hui forces in Suiyuan under generals Ma Hongbin and Ma Buqing routed the Imperial Japanese Army and their puppet Inner Mongol forces and prevented the planned Japanese advance into northwest China. Ma Hongbin's father Ma Fulu had fought against Japanese in the Boxer Rebellion. Hui cemeteries were destroyed for military reasons. Many Hui fought in the war against the Japanese, including Bai Chongxi, Ma Hongbin, Ma Hongkui, Ma Bufang, Ma Zhanshan, Ma Biao, Ma Zhongying, Ma Buqing and Ma Hushan.

Qinghai Tibetans served in the Qinghai army against the Japanese. The Qinghai Tibetans view the Tibetans of Central Tibet (Tibet proper, ruled by the Dalai Lamas from Lhasa) as distinct and different from themselves, even taking pride in the fact that they have not been ruled by Lhasa since the collapse of the Tibetan Empire.

Xining was subjected to aerial bombardment by Japanese warplanes in 1941, causing all ethnicities in Qinghai to unite against the Japanese. General Han Youwen directed the defense of the city of Xining during air raids by Japanese planes. Han survived an aerial bombardment by Japanese planes in Xining while he was being directed via telephone by Ma Bufang, who hid in an air-raid shelter in a military barracks. The bombing resulted in Han being buried in rubble, though he was later rescued. John Scott reported in 1934 that there was both strong anti-Japanese feeling and anti-Bolshevik among the Muslims of Gansu and he mentioned the Muslim generals Ma Fuxiang, Ma Qi, Ma Anliang and Ma Bufang who was chairman of Qinghai province when he stayed in Xining.

=== 1942–1943: Allied entry ===
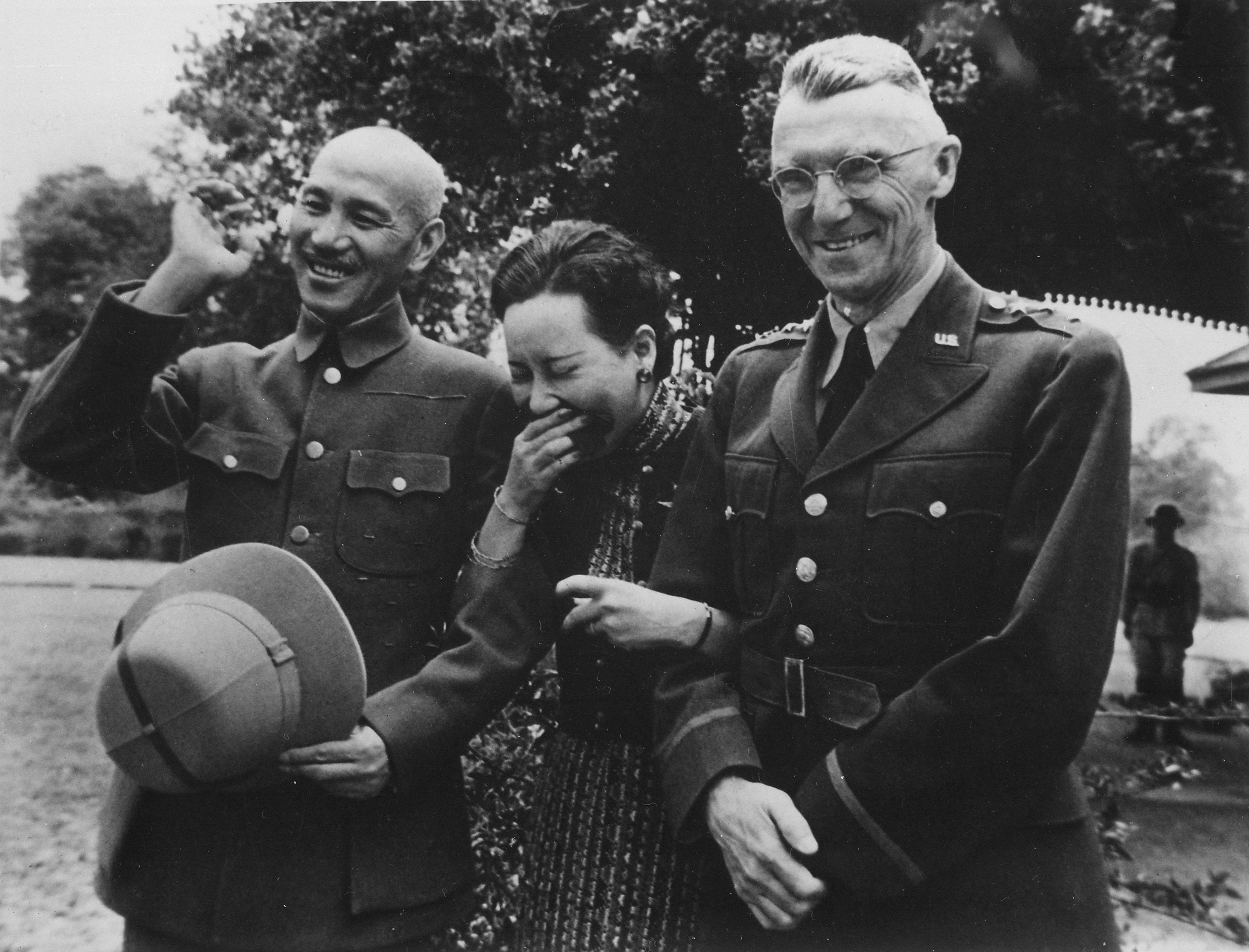
Generalissimo Chiang Kai-shek and his wife Soong Mei-ling with Lieutenant General Joseph Stilwell in 1942, British Burma

The 18 February 1943 address by Soong Mei-ling before both houses of the United States Congress.

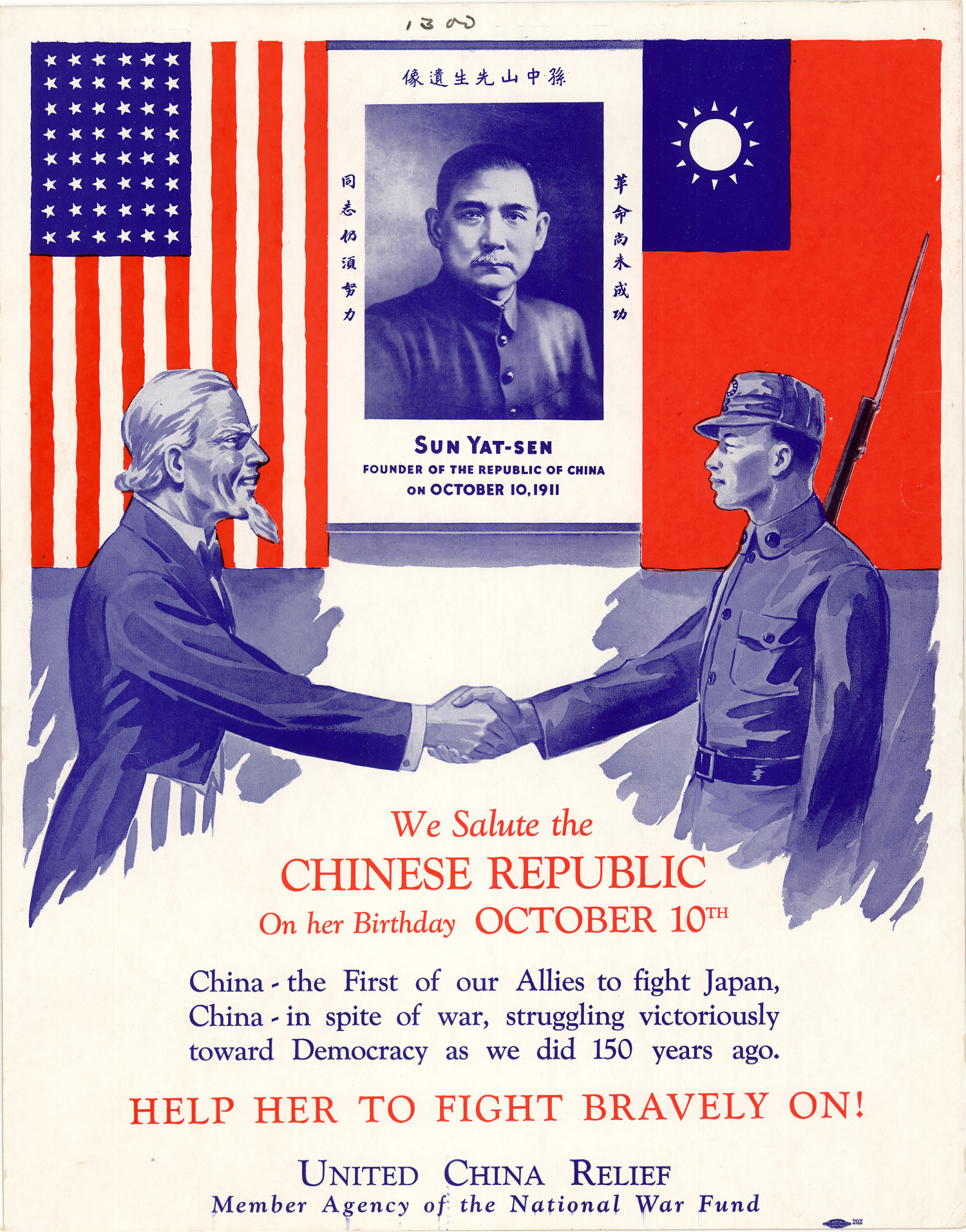
A United States poster from the United China Relief organization advocating aid to China

==== Embargoes ====
Japan had expected to extract economic benefits of its invasions of China and elsewhere, including in the form of fuel and raw material resources. As Japanese aggression continued, however, the United States responded with trade embargoes on various goods, including oil and petroleum (beginning December 1939) and scrap iron and munitions (beginning July 1940). The United States demanded that Japan withdraw from China and also refused to recognize Japan's occupations of the Indochinese countries. In spring 1941, trade negotiations between the United States and Japan failed. In July 1941, the United States froze Japanese financial assets and obtained Dutch and British agreements to also cut those countries' oil exports to Japan. This in turn prompted the Japanese decision to attack Pearl Harbor in December 1941.

The United States embargoed Japan in 1940, depriving it of shipments of oil and various other resources necessary to continue the war in China. This pressure, which was intended to disparage a continuation of the war and bring Japan into negotiation, resulted in the Attack on Pearl Harbor in Hawaii and Japan's drive south to procure from the resource-rich European colonies in Southeast Asia by force the resources which the United States had denied to them. Following the attack on Pearl Harbor, the United States declared war against Japan, and within days China joined the Allies in formal declaration of war against Japan, Germany and Italy. As the Western Allies entered the war against Japan, the Sino-Japanese War would become part of a greater conflict, the Pacific theatre of World War II. Japan's military action against the United States also restrained its capacity to conduct further offensive operations in China, although it had seized British Hong Kong in December 1941.

==== Foreign aid ====
After the Lend-Lease Act was passed in 1941, American financial and military aid began to trickle in. Claire Lee Chennault commanded the 1st American Volunteer Group (nicknamed the Flying Tigers), with American pilots flying American warplanes which were painted with the Chinese flag to attack the Japanese. He headed both the volunteer group and the uniformed U.S. Army Air Forces units that replaced it in 1942.

However, it was the Soviets that provided the greatest material help for China from 1937 into 1941, with fighter aircraft for the Nationalist Chinese Air Force and artillery and armour for the Chinese Army through the Sino-Soviet Treaty; Operation Zet also provided for a group of Soviet volunteer combat aviators to join the Chinese Air Force in the fight against the Japanese occupation from late 1937 through 1939. Almost immediately, Chinese troops achieved another decisive victory in the Battle of Changsha, which earned the Chinese government much prestige from the Western Allies. China was one of the "Big Four" Allied Powers during the war. President Franklin D. Roosevelt referred to the United States, United Kingdom, Soviet Union and China as the world's "Four Policemen"; his primary reason for elevating China to such a status was the belief that after the war it would serve as a bulwark against the Soviet Union.

==== Tensions with Allied commanders ====
Chiang was named Allied commander-in-chief in the China theater in 1942. American general Joseph Stilwell served for a time as Chiang's chief of staff, while simultaneously commanding American forces in the China-Burma-India Theater. For many reasons, relations between Stilwell and Chiang soon broke down. Some historians (such as Barbara W. Tuchman) have suggested it was largely due to the corruption and inefficiency of the Kuomintang government, while others (such as Ray Huang and Hans van de Ven) have depicted it as a more complicated situation.

Stilwell had a strong desire to assume total control of Chinese troops and pursue an aggressive strategy, while Chiang preferred a patient and less expensive strategy of out-waiting the Japanese. Chiang continued to maintain a defensive posture despite Allied pleas to actively break the Japanese blockade, because China had already suffered tens of millions of war casualties and believed that Japan would eventually capitulate in the face of America's overwhelming industrial output. For these reasons the other Allies gradually began to lose confidence in the Chinese ability to conduct offensive operations from the Asian mainland, and instead concentrated their efforts against the Japanese in the Pacific Ocean Areas and South West Pacific Area, employing an island hopping strategy. Long-standing differences in national interest and political stance among China, the United States, and the United Kingdom remained in place.

==== Burma campaign ====
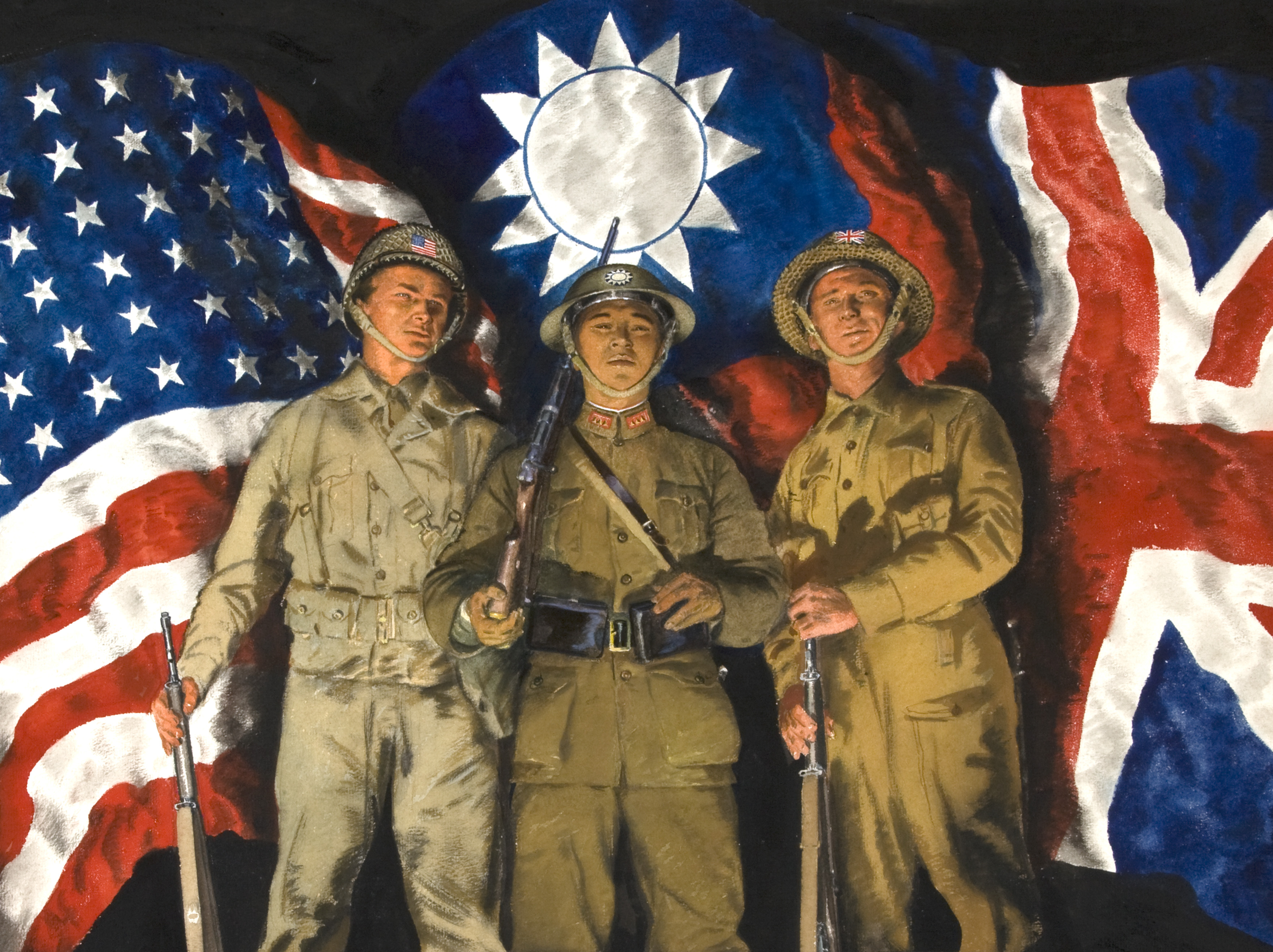
1943 propaganda painting with American, Chinese and British soldiers

Chiang Kai-shek continued to receive supplies from the United States. However, in contrast to the Arctic supply route to the Soviet Union which stayed open through most of the war, sea routes to China and the Yunnan–Vietnam Railway had been closed since 1940. Therefore, between the closing of the Burma Road in 1942 and its re-opening as the Ledo Road in 1945, foreign aid was largely limited to what could be flown in over "The Hump". In Burma, on 16 April 1942, 7,000 British soldiers were encircled by the Japanese 33rd Division during the Battle of Yenangyaung and rescued by the Chinese 38th Division. Chinese forces advanced to northern Burma in late 1943, besieged Japanese troops in Myitkyina, and captured Mount Song.

British Prime Minister Winston Churchill was reluctant to devote British troops, many of whom had been routed by the Japanese in earlier campaigns, to the reopening of the Burma Road; Stilwell, on the other hand, believed that reopening the road was vital, as all China's mainland ports were under Japanese control. The Allies' "Europe first" policy did not sit well with Chiang, while the later British insistence that China send more and more troops to Indochina for use in the Burma Campaign was seen by Chiang as an attempt to use Chinese manpower to defend British colonial possessions. Chiang also believed that China should divert its crack army divisions from Burma to eastern China to defend the airbases of the American bombers that he hoped would defeat Japan through bombing, a strategy that American general Claire Lee Chennault supported but which Stilwell strongly opposed. In addition, Chiang voiced his support of the Indian independence movement in a 1942 meeting with Mohandas Gandhi, which further soured the relationship between China and the United Kingdom.

Most of China's industry had already been captured or destroyed by Japan, and the Soviet Union refused to allow the United States to supply China through the Kazakhstan into Xinjiang as the Xinjiang warlord Sheng Shicai had turned anti-Soviet in 1942 with Chiang's approval. For these reasons, the Chinese government never had the supplies and equipment needed to mount major counter-offensives. Despite the severe shortage of matériel, in 1943, the Chinese were successful in repelling major Japanese offensives in Hubei and Changde.

==== Indochina resistance ====
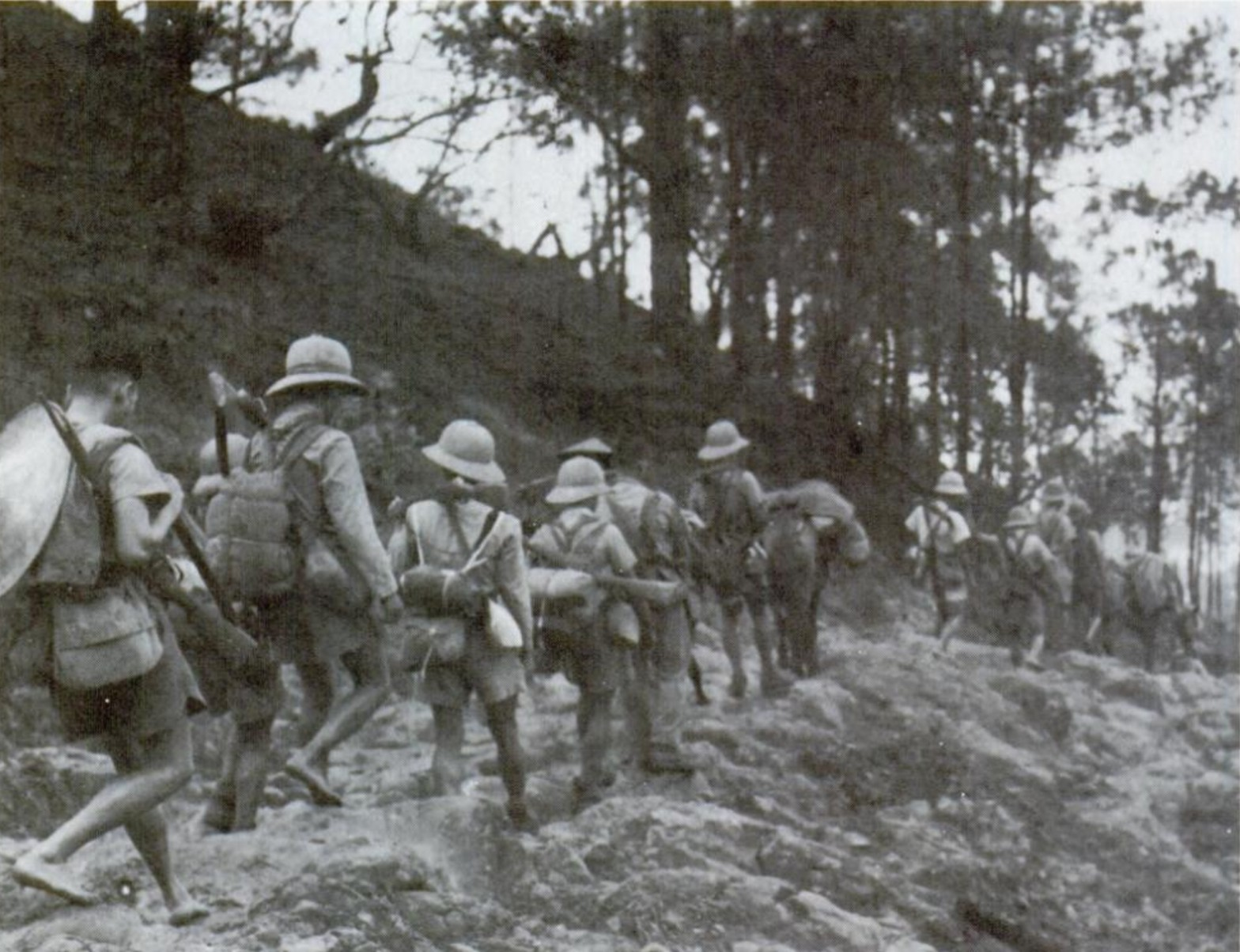
French colonial troops retreating to the Chinese border after the Japanese coup d'état in March 1945

The Chinese Kuomintang also supported the Vietnamese Việt Nam Quốc Dân Đảng (VNQDD) in its battle against French and Japanese imperialism. In Guangxi, Chinese military leaders were organizing Vietnamese nationalists against the Japanese. The VNQDD had been active in Guangxi and some of their members had joined the KMT army. Under the umbrella of KMT activities, a broad alliance of nationalists emerged. With Ho Chi Minh at the forefront, the Viet Nam Doc Lap Dong Minh Hoi (Vietnamese Independence League, usually known as the Viet Minh) was formed and based in the town of Jingxi. The pro-VNQDD nationalist Ho Ngoc Lam, a KMT army officer and former disciple of Phan Bội Châu, was named as the deputy of Phạm Văn Đồng, later to be Ho's Prime Minister. The front was later broadened and renamed the Viet Nam Giai Phong Dong Minh (Vietnam Liberation League).

The Viet Nam Revolutionary League was a union of various Vietnamese nationalist groups, run by the pro Chinese VNQDD. Chinese KMT General Zhang Fakui created the league to further Chinese influence in Indochina, against the French and Japanese. Its stated goal was for unity with China under the Three Principles of the People, created by KMT founder Dr. Sun and opposition to Japanese and French Imperialists. The Revolutionary League was controlled by Nguyen Hai Than, who was born in China and could not speak Vietnamese. General Zhang shrewdly blocked the Communists of Vietnam, and Ho Chi Minh from entering the league, as Zhang's main goal was Chinese influence in Indochina. The KMT utilized these Vietnamese nationalists during World War II against Japanese forces.

Franklin D. Roosevelt, through General Stilwell, privately made it clear that they preferred that the French not reacquire French Indochina (modern day Vietnam, Cambodia, and Laos) after the war was over. Roosevelt instead offered Chiang Kai-shek control of all of Indochina. It was said that Chiang Kai-shek replied: "Under no circumstances!" After the war, 200,000 Chinese troops under General Lu Han were sent by Chiang Kai-shek to northern Indochina (north of the 16th parallel) to accept the surrender of Japanese occupying forces there, and remained in Indochina until 1946, when the French returned. The Chinese used the VNQDD, the Vietnamese branch of the Chinese Kuomintang, to increase their influence in French Indochina and to put pressure on their opponents. Chiang Kai-shek threatened the French with war in response to maneuvering by the French and Ho Chi Minh's forces against each other, forcing them to come to a peace agreement. In February 1946, he also forced the French to surrender all of their concessions in China and to renounce their extraterritorial privileges in exchange for the Chinese withdrawing from northern Indochina and allowing French troops to reoccupy the region. Following France's agreement to these demands, the withdrawal of Chinese troops began in March 1946.

==== Aerial bombardment ====
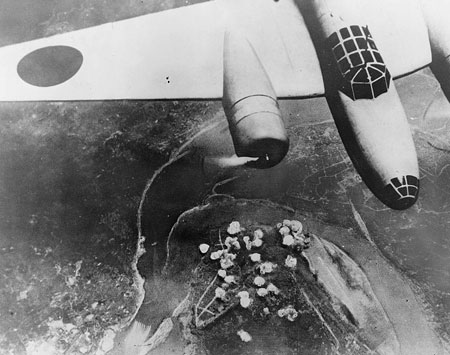
A photograph taken by IJA reporters on 16 June 1940 and published in the Asahi Shimbun showing bombs from IJAAF Type 97/Ki-21 (九七式重爆撃機) heavy bombers exploding on Yuzhong Peninsula

With Japanese casualties and costs mounting, the Imperial General Headquarters attempted to break Chinese resistance by ordering the Imperial Japanese Navy Air Service and Imperial Japanese Army Air Service to launch the war's first massive air raids on civilian targets. Japanese raiders hit the Kuomintang's newly established provisional capital of Chongqing and most other major cities in unoccupied China, leaving many people either dead, injured, or homeless.

After the Doolittle Raid, the Imperial Japanese Army conducted a massive sweep through Zhejiang and Jiangxi, now known as the Zhejiang-Jiangxi Campaign, with the goal of finding the surviving American airmen, applying retribution on the Chinese who aided them and destroying air bases. The operation started 15 May 1942, with 40 infantry battalions and 15–16 artillery battalions but was repelled by Chinese forces in September.

During this campaign, the Imperial Japanese Army left behind a trail of devastation and also spread cholera, typhoid, plague and dysentery pathogens. Chinese estimates record that as many as 250,000 civilians, the vast majority of whom were destitute Tanka boat people and other pariah ethnicities unable to flee, may have died of disease. It caused more than 16 million civilians to evacuate far away deep inward China. Around 90% of Ningbo's population had already fled before battle started.

=== 1944: Renewed offensives ===
==== Operation Ichi-Go ====
In 1944, the Communists launched counteroffensives from the liberated areas against Japanese forces. Japan's 1944 Operation Ichi-Go was the largest military campaign of the Second Sino-Japanese War. The campaign mobilized 500,000 Japanese troops, 100,000 horses, 1,500 artillery pieces, and 800 tanks. Japanese forces advanced along Chinese railway lines and targeted American airfields. Chinese armies were poorly supplied and unprepared, and consequently lost 300,000 casualties along with large swathes of territory.

In late November 1944, the Japanese advance slowed approximately 300 miles from Chongqing as it experienced shortages of trained soldiers and materiel. Although Operation Ichi-Go achieved its goals of seizing United States air bases and establishing a potential railway corridor from Manchukuo to Hanoi, it did so too late to impact the result of the broader war. American bombers in Chengdu were moved to the Mariana Islands where, along with bombers from bases in Saipan and Tinian, they could still bomb the Japanese home islands.

The poor performance of Chiang Kai-shek's forces in opposing the Japanese advance during Operation Ichi-Go became widely viewed as demonstrating Chiang's incompetence. It irreparably damaged the Roosevelt administration's view of Chiang and the KMT. The campaign further weakened the Nationalist economy and government revenues. Because of the Nationalists' increasing inability to fund the military, Nationalist authorities overlooked military corruption and smuggling. The Nationalist army increasingly turned to raiding villages to press-gang peasants into service and force marching them to assigned units. Approximately 10% of these peasants died before reaching their units.

After Operation Ichi-Go, Chiang Kai-shek started a plan to withdraw Chinese troops from the Burma theatre against Japan in Southeast Asia for a counter offensive called "White Tower" and "Iceman" against Japanese soldiers in China in 1945. By the end of 1944, Chinese troops under the command of Sun Li-jen attacking from India, and those under Wei Lihuang attacking from Yunnan, joined forces in Mong-Yu, successfully driving the Japanese out of North Burma and securing the Ledo Road, China's vital supply artery.

==== Ili Rebellion ====
As the war went on, Nationalist General Ma Buqing was in virtual control of the Gansu corridor. Ma had earlier fought against the Japanese, but because the Soviet threat was great, Chiang in July 1942 directed him to move 30,000 of his troops to the Tsaidam marsh in the Qaidam Basin of Qinghai. Chiang further named Ma as Reclamation Commissioner, to threaten Sheng's southern flank in Xinjiang, which bordered Tsaidam.

The Ili Rebellion broke out in Xinjiang when the Kuomintang Hui Officer Liu Bin-Di was killed while fighting Turkic Uyghur rebels in November 1944. The Soviet Union supported the Turkic rebels against the Kuomintang, and Kuomintang forces fought back. The conflict ended in a ceasefire and establishment of a coalition government between the East Turkestan Republic and Republic of China in June 1946.

=== 1945: Conclusion ===
==== Final Chinese offensives ====
In the spring of 1945, the Chinese launched offensives that retook Hunan and Guangxi. With the Chinese army progressing well in training and equipment, Wedemeyer planned to launch Operation Carbonado in summer 1945 to retake Guangdong and Hong Kong, thus obtaining a coastal port, and from there drive northwards toward Shanghai. However, the atomic bombings of Hiroshima and Nagasaki and Soviet invasion of Manchuria in August 1945 hastened Japanese surrender and these plans were not put into action.

==== Japanese surrender ====
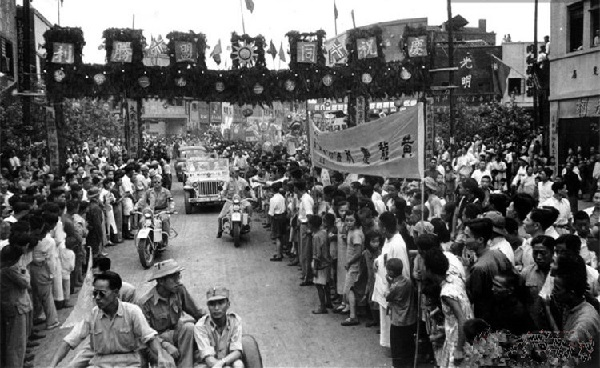
WWII victory parade at Chongqing on 3 September 1945

Japanese General Yasuji Okamura (right) surrenders to Chinese General He Yingqin (left) in Nanjing, 9 September 1945

During the Second Sino-Japanese War, the Japanese had consistent tactical successes but they failed to achieve strategic results. Although it seized the majority of China's industrial capacity, occupied most major cities, and rarely lost a battle, Japan's occupation of China was costly. Japan had approximately 50,000 military fatalities each year and 200,000 wounded per year.

After the Soviet-Japanese War started on 8 August, the Kwantung Army, which was the primary Japanese fighting force in Manchuria, consisting of over a million men but lacking in adequate armour, artillery, or air support, had been destroyed by the Soviets.

Japanese Emperor Hirohito officially capitulated to the Allies on 15 August 1945. The official surrender was signed aboard the battleship USS Missouri on 2 September 1945, in a ceremony where several Allied commanders including Chinese general Hsu Yung-chang were present.

After the Allied victory in the Pacific, General Douglas MacArthur ordered all Japanese forces within China (excluding Manchuria), Taiwan and French Indochina north of 16° north latitude to surrender to Chiang Kai-shek, and the Japanese troops in China formally surrendered in Nanking on 9 September 1945, at 09:00 Kansu-Szechwan Time (UTC+07:00). The ninth hour of the ninth day of the ninth month was chosen in echo of the Armistice of 11 November 1918 (on the eleventh hour of the eleventh day of the eleventh month) and because "nine" (九 jiǔ) is a homophone of the word for "long lasting" (久) in Chinese (to suggest that the peace won would last forever).

Chiang relied on American help in transporting Nationalist troops to regain control of formerly Japanese-occupied areas. Non-Chinese generally viewed the behavior of these troops as undercutting Nationalist legitimacy, and these troops engaged in corruption and looting, leading to widespread views of a "botched liberation". The Nationalist government seized Japanese-held businesses at the time of the Japanese surrender. The Nationalist government made little effort to return these businesses to their original Chinese owners. A mechanism existed through which Chinese and foreign owners could petition for the return of their former property. In practice, the Nationalist government and its officials retained a great deal of the seized property and embezzling property, particularly from warehouses, was common. Nationalist officials sometimes extorted money from individuals in liberated territories under threat of labeling them as Japanese collaborators. Chiang's focus on his communist opponents prompted him to leave Japanese troops or troops of the Japanese puppet regimes to remain on duty in occupied areas so as to avoid their surrender to Communist forces.

== Tactics ==
=== Guerrilla and suicide attacks ===
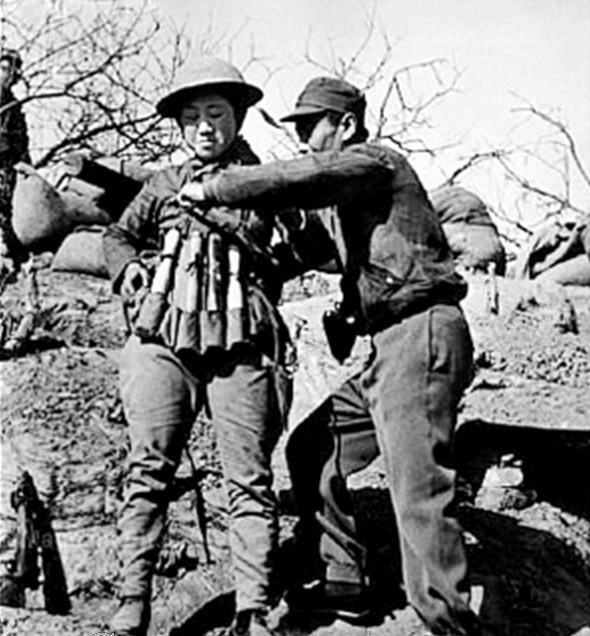
Chinese suicide bomber putting on an explosive vest made out of Model 24 hand grenades to use in an attack on Japanese tanks at the Battle of Taierzhuang

The NRA adopted the concept of "magnetic warfare" to attract advancing Japanese troops to definite points where they were subjected to ambush, flanking attacks, and encirclements in major engagements. The most prominent example of this tactic was the successful defense of Changsha in 1939, and again in the 1941 battle, in which heavy casualties were inflicted on the IJA. After their victory at Wuhan, Japan advanced deep into Communist territory and redeployed 50,000 troops to the Shanxi-Chahar-Hebei Border Region. Elements of the Eighth Route Army soon attacked the advancing Japanese, claiming to have inflicted between 3,000 and 5,000 casualties and caused a Japanese retreat. The Eighth Route Army carried out guerilla operations and established military and political bases.

As the Japanese military came to understand that the Communists avoided conventional attacks and defense, it altered its tactics. The Japanese military built more roads to quicken movement between strongpoints and cities, blockaded rivers and roads in an effort to disrupt Communists supply, sought to expand militia from its puppet regime to conserve manpower, and use systematic violence on civilians in the Border Region in an effort to destroy its economy. The Japanese military mandated confiscation of the Eighth Route Army's goods and used this directive as a pretext to confiscate goods, including engaging in grave robbery in the Border Region.

Chinese armies deployed "dare to die corps" (traditional Chinese: 敢死隊; simplified Chinese: 敢死队; pinyin: gǎnsǐduì) or "suicide squads" against the Japanese. Suicide bombing was also used against the Japanese. A Chinese soldier detonated a grenade vest and killed 20 Japanese at Sihang Warehouse. Chinese troops strapped explosives, such as grenade packs or dynamite to their bodies and threw themselves under Japanese tanks to blow them up. This tactic was used during the Battle of Shanghai, where a Chinese suicide bomber stopped a Japanese tank column by exploding himself beneath the lead tank, and at the Battle of Taierzhuang, where dynamite and grenades were strapped on by Chinese troops who rushed at Japanese tanks and blew themselves up. During one incident at Taierzhuang, Chinese suicide bombers destroyed four Japanese tanks with grenade bundles.

=== Chemical and biological warfare ===
In contravention of Article 23 of the Hague Conventions of 1899 and 1907, article V of the Treaty in Relation to the Use of Submarines and Noxious Gases in Warfare, article 171 of the Treaty of Versailles and despite a resolution adopted by the League of Nations on 14 May 1938, condemning the use of poison gas by the Empire of Japan, the Imperial Japanese Army frequently used chemical weapons during the war. According to statistics from the Nationalist government, the Japanese army from July 1937 until September 1945 used poison gas 1,973 times. Based on available data, a total of 103,069 Chinese soldiers and civilians died from biological and chemical weapons. According to historians Yoshiaki Yoshimi and Seiya Matsuno, the chemical weapons were authorized by specific orders given by Hirohito himself, transmitted by the Imperial General Headquarters. Those orders were transmitted either by Prince Kan'in Kotohito or General Hajime Sugiyama. Gases manufactured in Okunoshima were used more than 2,000 times against Chinese soldiers and civilians in the war in China in the 1930s and 1940s. For example, the Emperor authorized the use of toxic gas on 375 separate occasions during the Battle of Wuhan from August to October 1938.

According to Walter E. Grunden, history professor at Bowling Green State University, Japan permitted the use of chemical weapons in China because the Japanese concluded that Chinese forces did not possess the capacity to retaliate in kind. The Japanese incorporated gas warfare into many aspects of their army, which includes special gas troops, infantry, artillery, engineers and air force; the Japanese were aware of basic gas tactics of other armies, and deployed multifarious gas warfare tactics in China. The Japanese were very dependent on gas weapons when they were engaged in chemical warfare. Japan used poison gas at Hankow during the Battle of Wuhan to break fierce Chinese resistance after conventional Japanese assaults were repelled by Chinese defenders. According to Freda Utley, during the battle at Hankow, in areas where Japanese artillery or gunboats on the river could not reach Chinese defenders on hilltops, Japanese infantrymen had to fight Chinese troops on the hills. She noted that the Japanese were inferior at hand-to-hand combat against the Chinese, and resorted to deploying poison gas to defeat the Chinese troops. She was told by General Li Zongren that the Japanese consistently used tear gas and mustard gas against Chinese troops. Li also added that his forces could not withstand large scale deployments of Japanese poison gas. Since Chinese troops did not have gas-masks, the poison gases provided enough time for Japanese troops to bayonet debilitated Chinese soldiers. Rana Mitter writes,

Under General Xue Yue, some 100,000 Chinese troops pushed back Japanese forces at Huangmei. At the fortress of Tianjiazhen, thousands of men fought until the end of September, with Japanese victory assured only with the use of poison gas.

They were also used during the invasion of Changde. During the battle in Yichang of October 1941, Japanese troops used chemical munitions in their artillery and mortar fire, and warplanes dropped gas bombs all over the area; since the Chinese troops were poorly equipped and without gas-masks, they were severely gassed, burned and killed.

Bacteriological weapons provided by Shirō Ishii's units were also profusely used. For example, in 1940, the Imperial Japanese Army Air Force bombed Ningbo with fleas carrying the bubonic plague. During the Khabarovsk War Crime Trials the accused, such as Major General Kiyashi Kawashima, testified that, in 1941, some 40 members of Unit 731 air-dropped plague-contaminated fleas on Changde. These attacks caused epidemic plague outbreaks. In the Zhejiang-Jiangxi Campaign, of the 10,000 Japanese soldiers who fell ill with the disease, about 1,700 Japanese troops died when the biological weapons rebounded on their own forces. Japan gave its own soldiers methamphetamines in the form of Philopon.

== Casualties ==
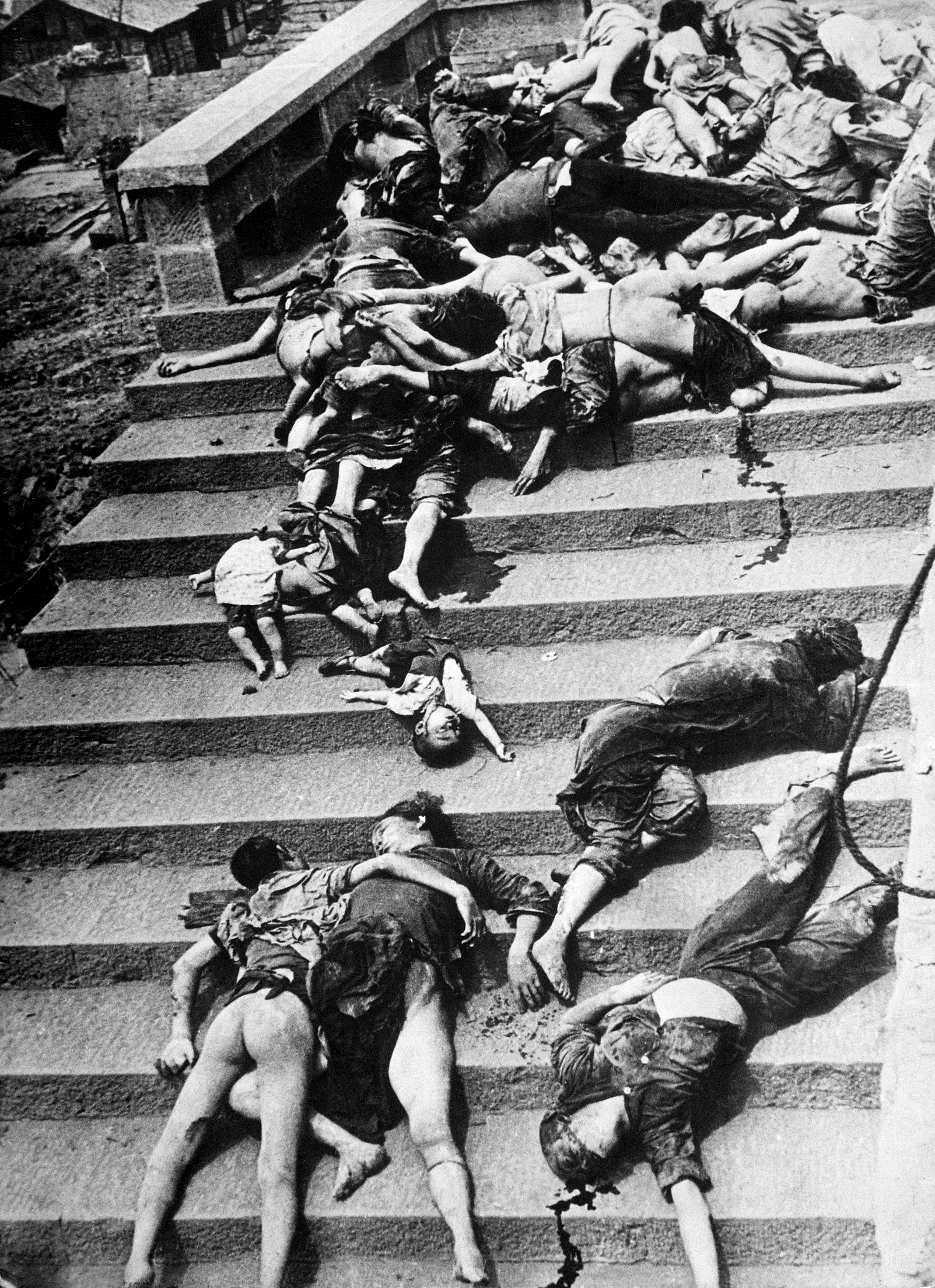
Casualties of a mass panic during a June 1941 Japanese bombing of Chongqing. More than 5,000 civilians died during the first two days of air raids in 1939.

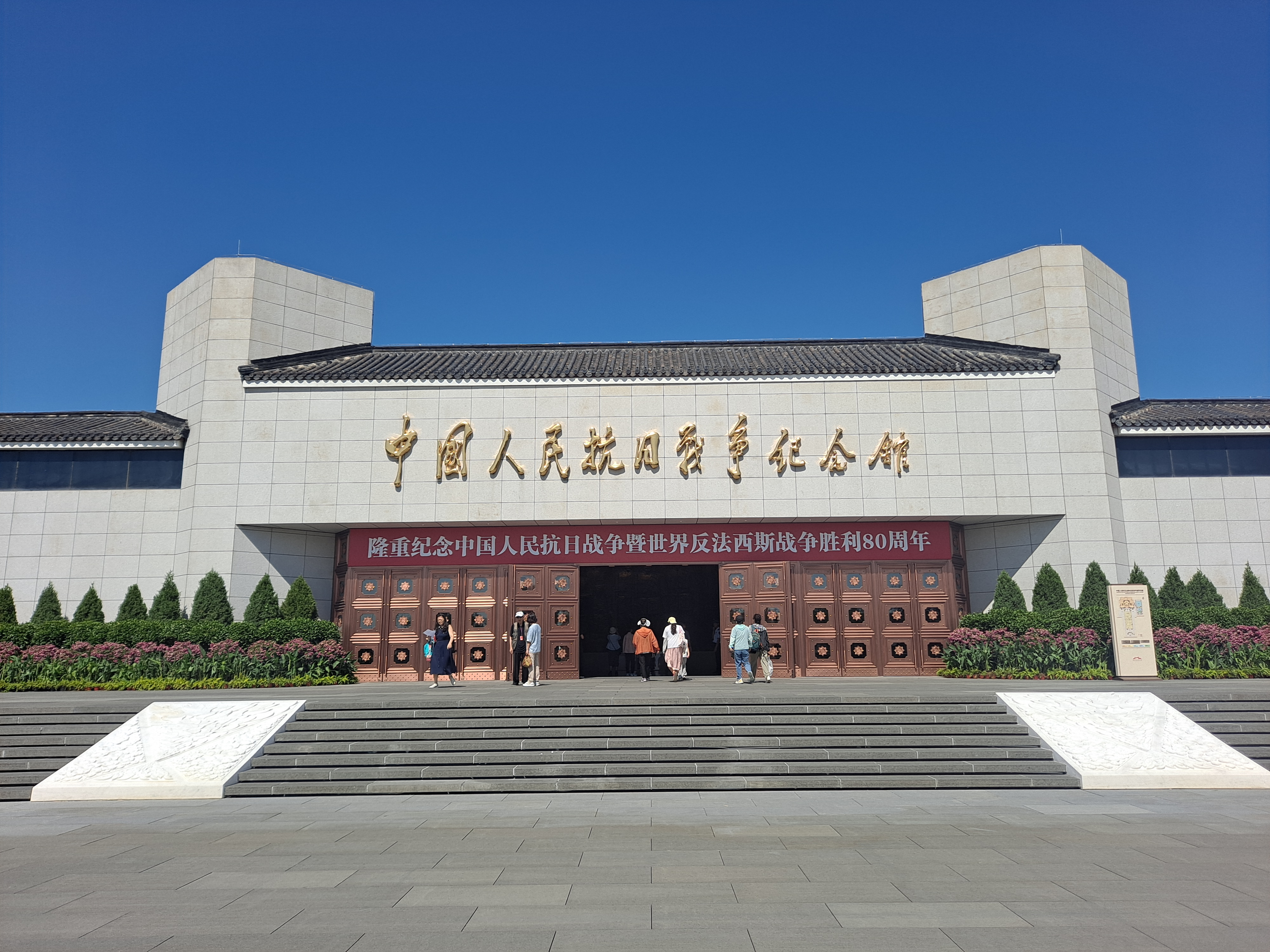
Museum of the War of Chinese People's Resistance Against Japanese Aggression in Fengtai, Beijing, on the site where the Marco Polo Bridge Incident took place

The conflict lasted eight years, two months, and two days (from 7 July 1937 to 9 September 1945). The total number of casualties that resulted from this war (and subsequently theater) equaled more than half the total number of casualties that later resulted from the entire Pacific War.

=== Chinese ===
Figures for Chinese deaths in the Second Sino-Japanese War vary. Modern estimates fall between 10 million and 20 million deaths, with a consensus of 15 million to 16 million total Chinese deaths, military and civilian. Historian Odd Arne Westad estimates that China suffered around 12 million civilian and 2 million military deaths during the war. One study showed a drop of 18 million in the Chinese population during the war. Duncan Anderson estimates that the total number of Chinese who died was at 20 million.

Official statistics from the People's Republic of China for civilian and military casualties in the Second Sino-Japanese War list over 35 million casualties, including over 20 million dead. Military casualties amounted to over 3.85 million out of the over 35 million figure. Based on data released by the Nationalists and Communists from 1945 to 1947, the total losses for Chinese military personnel and civilians in the Second Sino-Japanese War amounted to 22,782,959 casualties (9,530,317 dead, 9,905,880 wounded or crippled, 540,562 missing, and 2,806,200 captured).

The Nationalists suffered higher casualties because they were the main combatants opposing the Japanese in each of the 22 major battles (involving more than 100,000 troops on both sides) between China and Japan. The Communist forces, by contrast, usually avoided pitched battles with the Japanese, in which their guerrilla tactics were less effective, and generally limited their combat to guerrilla actions (the Hundred Regiments Offensive and the Battle of Pingxingguan are notable exceptions). The Nationalists committed their strongest divisions in early battle against the Japanese (including the 36th, 87th, 88th divisions of Chiang's Central Army) to defend Shanghai and continued to deploy most of their forces to fight the Japanese even as the Communists changed their strategy to engage mainly in a political offensive against the Japanese while declaring that the CCP should "save and preserve our strength and wait for favourable timing" by the end of 1941.

Taiwanese official accounts of the war report the Nationalist Chinese Army lost 3,238,000 military casualties (1,797,000 wounded, 1,320,000 killed, and 120,000 missing). (Note: The Nationalists fought in 22 major engagements, most of which involved more than 100,000 troops on both sides, 1,171 minor engagements most of which involved more than 50,000 troops on both sides, and 38,931 skirmishes.) (Note: The Chinese reported their yearly total battle casualties as 367,362 for 1937, 735,017 for 1938, 346,543 for 1939, and 299,483 for 1941.) Another official statistics of the military put casualties of the Kuomintang Army as 1,776,678 dead, 1,301,357 wounded, 77,108 crippled, and 116,593 missing. The Ministry of Military Affairs recorded a total of 10,322,934 losses from illnesses, reorganizations, and desertions. Postwar Nationalist investigations recorded a total of 3,407,931 military combat casualties (1,371,374 killed, 1,738,324 wounded, and 298,233 missing) and 422,479 military deaths from illnesses. They recorded 2,313 casualties (1,042 killed and 1,271 wounded) in the Air Defense Service. (Note: Yearly casualties for the army are 881,349 in 1937, 517,121 in 1938, 413,853 in 1939, 153,983 in 1940, 258,530 in 1941, 126,557 in 1942, 67,903 in 1943, 322,625 in 1944, and 649,503 in 1945.) (Note: The losses recorded in 1937 included losses in the Mukden Incident, January 28 Incident, and Defense of the Great Wall. The losses recorded in 1945 included losses in guerilla fighting from 1937 until 1945) The Ministry of Military Affairs recorded losses among hospitalized soldiers in institutions directly run by the Nationalist Government at 443,398 for their wounded (45,710 dead, 123,017 crippled, and 274,671 deserted) and 937,559 losses for their sick (422,479 dead, 191,644 crippled, and 323,436 deserted), with a total of 1,380,957 losses (468,189 dead, 314,661 crippled, and 598,107 deserted). From the start of the war on 7 July 1937 to April 1945, a total of 1,178,988 wounded and 1,583,571 sick troops were received by the various hospitals directly administered by the Ministry of Military Affairs. The majority of desertions among wounded troops occurred in the first two years of the war.

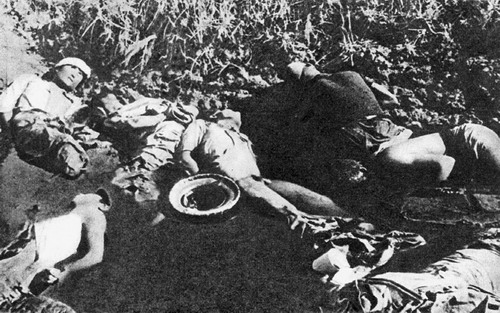
A pond filled with the bodies of more than 300 executed Chinese soldiers during the Nanjing Massacre.

According to a report from the Military Commission of the Kuomintang in August 1945, the Chinese Army had suffered approximately 3 million casualties by then, including approximately 1,8 million dead and 1,2 million wounded. Of the approximately 3 million troops killed or wounded, only 444,708 were approved for pensions as the names, addresses, and family members of most of the men who were killed or wounded could not be identified. Based on statistics from various hospitals and army units, the Ministry of Military Affairs and Political Affairs in 1946 reported the casualties of the Chinese Army as 1,675,845 killed or died (including 160,619 missing on the battlefield) and 1,715,448 wounded. A total of 561,321 compensation orders were issued with the names and addresses of the deceased. According to another statistics, the National Revolutionary Army suffered 4,972,754 officers and soldiers casualties in the eight-year war. Only 458,039, or less than 10%, received pensions after the war.

A 1959 American academic study estimated military casualties at 1.5 million killed in battle, 750,000 missing in action, 1.5 million deaths due to disease and 3 million wounded. This was based on the National Central Research Institute's study of China's losses from 7 July 1937 until 6 July 1943. According to Hau Pei-tsun, a former officer of the National Revolutionary Army and premier of the Republic of China in Taiwan, over 1,956,000 soldiers of the National Revolutionary Army were killed in action during the war (including in the Burma campaign) and several times more were wounded in action.

=== Japanese ===
The Japanese recorded between 1.1 and 1.9 million military casualties during the Second Sino-Japanese War, according to the Japan Defense Ministry, was 480,000. Based on the investigation of the Japanese Yomiuri Shimbun, the military death toll of Japan in China is about 700,000 since 1937 (excluding the deaths in Manchuria and Burma campaign). Around 900,000 Japanese soldiers were wounded in China.

Hilary Conroy records a total of 447,000 Japanese soldiers who died or went missing in China during the Second Sino-Japanese War. Of the 1,130,000 Imperial Japanese Army soldiers who died during World War II, 39 percent died in China. In War Without Mercy, John W. Dower claims that a total of 396,000 Japanese soldiers died in China during the Second Sino-Japanese War. Of this number, the Imperial Japanese Army lost 388,605 soldiers and the Navy lost 8,000 sailors. Another 54,000 soldiers also died after the war had ended, mostly from illness and starvation. Of the 1,740,955 Japanese soldiers who died during World War II, 22 percent died in China.

From 1937 to 1941, 185,647 Japanese soldiers were killed in China and 520,000 were wounded. Disease also incurred critical losses on Japanese forces. From 1937 to 1941, 430,000 Japanese soldiers were recorded as being sick. In North China alone, 18,000 soldiers were evacuated back to Japan for illnesses in 1938, 23,000 in 1939, and 15,000 in 1940. (Note: This number does not include the casualties of the large numbers of Chinese collaborator government troops fighting on the Japanese side.) From 1941 to 1945: 202,958 dead; another 54,000 dead after war's end. Chinese forces also report that by May 1945, 22,293 Japanese soldiers were captured as prisoners. Many more Japanese soldiers surrendered when the war ended. However, the Ministry of Military Affairs of the Kuomintang recorded only 565 Japanese held in its POW camps by June 1942 including 195 in the first and 370 in the second. (Note: Excluding 40 who died and over 50 POWs who had not been transferred to the camps by the various Chinese war zones until June 1940, 68 who died and 85 who were released from the POW camps from July 1940 to June 1941, and approximately 110 who died from July 1941 to June 1942.) Throughout its operation until the transfer of all POWs to Chongqing at the end of 1944, the Second POW Camp in Zhenyuan, Guizhou generally held 500 to as many as 700 Japanese. According to General Yasuji Okamura, excluding the over one million Japanese troops who surrendered after the war, 1,358 Japanese POWs including 1,212 army personnel, 40 naval personnel, and 106 merchants originally held in POW camps in Chengdu, Chongqing, and Zhenyuan were repatriated from Nanjing by May 1946. Most were repatriated by the Kuomintang including Japanese troops who were captured in Burma and moved to Chongqing. The Communists, except for the transfer of a few POWs to the Kuomintang as a token gesture, kept most of their POWs in Yan'an and General Okamura had no concrete information of how many were held there.

Contemporary studies from the Beijing Central Compilation and Translation Press state that the Japanese suffered a total of 2,227,200 casualties, including 1,055,000 dead and 1,172,341 injured. These Chinese publication claims these numbers were largely based on Japanese publications. Both Nationalist and Communist Chinese sources report that their respective forces were responsible for the deaths of over 1.7 million Japanese soldiers. Nationalist War Minister He Yingqin himself contested the Communists' claims, finding it impossible for a force of "untrained, undisciplined, poorly equipped" guerrillas of Communist forces to have killed so many enemy soldiers. In 1940, the National Herald stated that the Japanese exaggerated Chinese casualties, while concealing the true number of Japanese casualties, releasing false figures that made them appear much lower.

=== Civilians ===
Of these numbers, between 5 million and 6 million starved to death or died from disease. Arne Westad estimates 14 million Chinese died directly from war, of which two million were soldiers and the rest civilians. Rana Mitter considers Westad's figures conservative. Rudolph Rummel gives a figure of 10,216,000 total dead in the war, of which 3,949,000 were murdered directly by the Japanese army, and the rest due to indirect causes like starvation, disease and disruption. The war created 95 million refugees.

Dr. Bian Xiuyue, a researcher from the Chinese Academy of Social Sciences, puts total Chinese losses between 1931 and 1945 at 20,620,939 dead (Note: Excluding the Henan Famine) and estimated the number of wounded at 20,692,246, for a total of 41,313,185 dead or wounded. (Note: Of the aforementioned figure, Nationalist and Communist military personnel and conscripts accounted for 27.61%, forced laborers and civilians from China (including Manchukuo) accounted for 69.21%, collaborationist Chinese military personnel accounted for 2.44%, overseas Chinese accounted for 0.61%, and Taiwanese military personnel in the Japanese Army accounted for 0.13%. If the 5.35 million Chinese who went missing or were captured by the Japanese Army and the 3 million civilians who died from famine in Henan Province are included, the total number of Chinese losses amounted to between 45 and 48 million dead, wounded, missing, and captured.) Taiwanese official accounts of the war report the Nationalist Chinese Army lost 3,238,000 military casualties and 5,787,352 civilians putting total casualties at 9,025,352. Postwar Nationalist investigations recorded 9,134,569 civilian casualties (4,397,504 dead and 4,737,065 wounded). (Note: Does not include civilian casualties in Communist-controlled lands) A 1959 American academic study estimated civilian casualties at 1,073,496 killed and 237,319 wounded from military activity; and 335,934 killed and 426,249 wounded in Japanese air attacks.

China suffered from famines during the war caused by droughts that affected both China and India. The Chinese famine of 1942–43 in Henan led to starvation deaths of 2 to 3 million people, and in Guangdong, famine caused more than 3 million people to flee or die. Victor Hanson estimates total Chinese deaths from disease and starvation are between 5 million and 6 million. According to historian Mitsuyoshi Himeta, at least 2.47 million civilians died during the "kill all, loot all, burn all" operation (Three Alls Policy, or sanko sakusen) implemented in May 1942 in north China by general Yasuji Okamura and authorized on 3 December 1941, by Imperial Headquarter Order number 575. During the course of the war, more than 200,000 Chinese women had been forced to become sex slaves of the Japanese military, known euphemistically as comfort women.

The property losses suffered by the Chinese were valued at 383 billion US dollars according to the currency exchange rate in July 1937, roughly 50 times the gross domestic product of Japan at that time (US$7.7 billion).

== Aftermath ==
=== Resumption of the Chinese Civil War ===
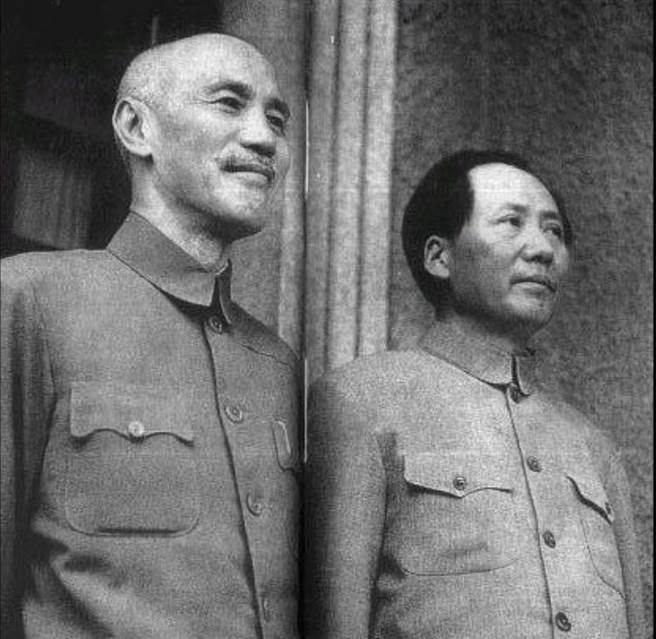
Chiang Kai-shek and Mao Zedong in 1945

In 1945, China emerged from the war a victor, but economically weak and on the verge of all-out civil war. The economy was sapped by the military demands of a long costly war and internal strife, by spiraling inflation, and by corruption in the Nationalist government that included profiteering, speculation and hoarding. Large swathes of the prime farming areas had been ravaged by the fighting and there was starvation and famine in the wake of the war. Many towns and cities were destroyed, and millions were rendered homeless by floods.

The poor performance of Nationalist forces opposing the Ichi-go campaign was largely viewed as reflecting poorly on Chiang's competence. Chiang blamed the failure on the United States, particularly Stilwell, who had used Chinese forces in the Burma Campaign and in Chiang's view, left China insufficiently defended. As part of the Yalta Conference, which allowed a Soviet sphere of influence in Manchuria, the Soviets dismantled and removed more than half of the industrial equipment left there by the Japanese before handing over Manchuria to China. The problems of rehabilitation and reconstruction after the ravages of a protracted war were staggering, and the war left the Nationalists severely weakened, and their policies left them unpopular.

Meanwhile, the war strengthened the Communists both in popularity and as a viable fighting force. At Yan'an and elsewhere in the communist controlled areas, Mao Zedong was able to adapt Marxism–Leninism to Chinese conditions. He taught party cadres to lead the masses by living and working with them, eating their food, and thinking their thoughts. In Japanese-occupied areas, the Communists had established military and political bases from which they carried out guerilla warfare. The Communists built popular support in these areas, returning land to poor peasants, reducing peasant's rent, and arming the people. By Spring 1945, there were 19 Communist-governed areas in China in which 95 million people lived. In Fall 1945, the Communist armies had 1.27 million men and were supported by 2.68 million militia members.

Mao also began to execute his plan to establish a new China by rapidly moving his forces from Yan'an and elsewhere to Manchuria. This opportunity was available to the Communists because although Nationalist representatives were not invited to the Yalta Conference, they had been consulted and had agreed to the Soviet invasion of Manchuria in the belief that the Soviet Union would cooperate only with the Nationalist government after the war. However, the Soviet occupation of Manchuria was long enough to allow the Communist forces to move in en masse and arm themselves with the military hardware surrendered by the Imperial Japanese Army, quickly establish control in the countryside and move into position to encircle the Nationalist government army in major cities of northeast China.

Following that, the Chinese Civil War resumed between the Nationalists and Communists, which concluded with the Communist victory in mainland China (which established the People's Republic of China) and the retreat of the Nationalists to Taiwan in 1949.

=== Stranded populations ===
Several thousand Japanese who were sent as colonizers to Manchukuo and Inner Mongolia were left behind in China. The majority of these were women, and they married mostly Chinese men and became known as "stranded war wives" (zanryu fujin). The Japanese government claims that these women had willingly chosen to stay in China, believing that women thirteen years of age and older were capable of making the decision to stay or leave China. Due to this, many women faced legal and cultural concerns about returning to Japan, such as less employment opportunities, less governmental aid and discrimination. Many of these women had gotten married and started families with Chinese men, which produced children ineligible to enter Japan due to their lack of Japanese citizenship. Additionally, Japan created repatriation legislation based both on age (if they were minors) and whether the individual willfully stayed in China or was forcibly separated from Japan. Other factors such as poor Sino-Japanese relations as well as poorer communication to rural areas, where many of these women lived, also prevented many Japanese women from returning to Japan.

Beginning in the early 1930s, the Japanese brought between 200,000 and 500,000 women and young girls, mostly Korean, to China. These women were used as sexual slaves by Japanese soldiers, and were referred to as "comfort women".

Many of the women became pregnant and gave birth to children. Some women recall being raped by Japanese soldiers more than fifty times a day. Many of these women were killed by the Japanese towards the end of the war. Those who returned to Korea faced social barring and stigmatism, making it difficult for them to move on from their horrific pasts. Some, knowing of the shame they would face, stayed in China. Most Korean comfort women who remained in China married Chinese men.

== Legacy ==
=== Commemorations ===
The days during which each country holds its respective commemorations relate to events surrounding the end of World War II. The People's Republic of China observes 3 September as the Victory Day of the Chinese People's War of Resistance Against Japanese Aggression, marking when Japan officially surrendered in Tokyo. Japan observes 15 August as it is the day when Emperor Hirohito declared Japan's surrender.

The People's Republic of China also holds military parades, memorials and other annual events, often held on 3 September, to commemorate the end of the Second Sino-Japanese War and World War II. These events reflect on events of the war, such as the Nanjing Massacre, while creating a collective sense of national unity and remembrance.

Major museums in China commemorate China's War of Resistance, including the Museum of the War of Chinese People's Resistance Against Japanese Aggression, the Nanjing Massacre Memorial Hall, the Nanjing Museum of the Site of the Lijixiang Comfort Stations, and the Chinese Comfort Women History Museum.

China also has organized projects to collect archival evidence and oral histories of people who witnessed atrocities by the Japanese forces, including a nationwide project begun in 2004 to collect data on casualties and property destruction.

=== Controversy over historical revisionism ===
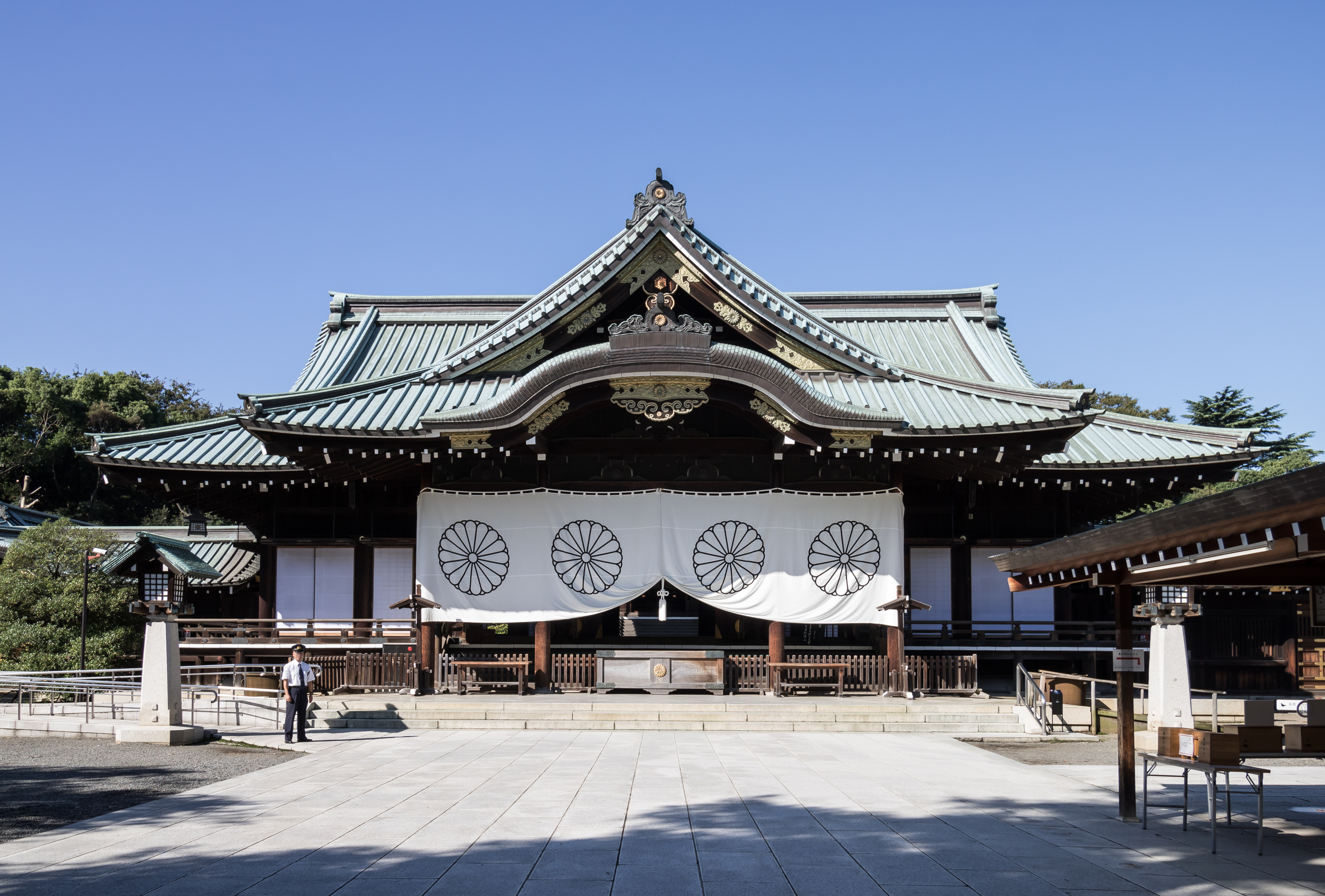
Yasukuni Shrine, a Shinto shrine dedicated to honoring the Japanese killed in war. It was established in 1869 by Emperor Meiji and remains a popular site for the Japanese and tourists. 14 Class-A convicted war criminals were secretly enshrined in 1978.

Japan holds a national memorial on 15 August, which features statements from government officials and many Japanese visit the Yasukuni Shrine, which continues to be a controversial point in Japanese relations with China. Museums such as the Yushukan Museum in Tokyo, which has an exhibit dedicated to the Second Sino-Japanese War containing artifacts of military elites, and memorial museums for Hiroshima and Nagasaki all allow the Japanese to remember the events of the Second Sino-Japanese War and World War II.

The war remains a major obstacle for Sino-Japanese relations. Many academics and pacifists in Japan recognized the country's war crimes, but as of 2025, denialists continue to be a significant force in the Japanese public sphere, especially among the Japanese political right. The Japanese government has been accused of historical revisionism, for example by allowing the approval of school textbooks omitting or glossing over Japan's militant past, although the most recent controversial book, the New History Textbook was used by only 0.039% of junior high schools in Japan and despite the efforts of the Japanese nationalist textbook reformers, by the late 1990s the most common Japanese schoolbooks contained references to, for instance, the Nanjing Massacre, Unit 731, and the comfort women of World War II, all historical issues which have faced challenges from ultranationalists in the past.

In 2005, a history textbook prepared by the Japanese Society for History Textbook Reform which had been approved by the government in 2001, sparked huge outcry and protests in China and Korea. It referred to the Nanjing Massacre and other atrocities such as the Manila massacre as an "incident", glossed over the issue of comfort women, and made only brief references to the death of Chinese soldiers and civilians in Nanjing. A copy of the 2005 version of a junior high school textbook titled New History Textbook found that there is no mention of the "Nanjing Massacre" or the "Nanjing Incident". Indeed, the only one sentence that referred to this event was: "they [the Japanese troops] occupied that city in December".

=== Political status of Taiwan ===
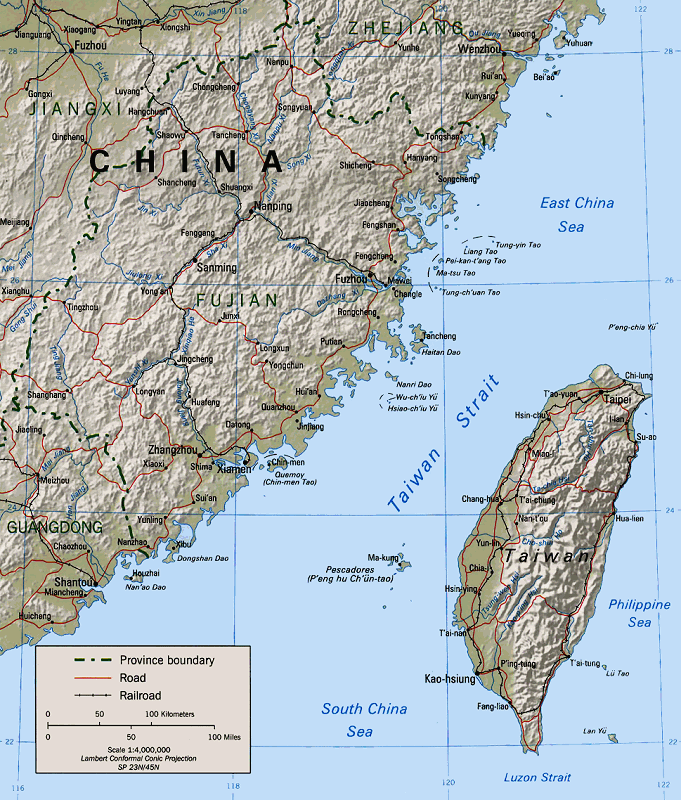
The Taiwan Strait and the island of Taiwan

During the Second Sino-Japanese War, Taiwan was a Japanese colony that was used as a strategic base for military operations against China and Southeast Asia. In the period before the war in the Pacific widened, Japan came to regard Taiwan as an "unsinkable aircraft carrier" and an important stepping stone in its military expansion. Native Han Chinese inhabitants on the island were given the option of moving back to the mainland, although few did.

The Japanese colonial period from 1895 to 1945 physically and culturally separated Taiwan from mainland China. The Japanese modernization, legal reform and assimilation policies fostered an autonomous socioeconomic consciousness which later formed the backbone of the nascent Taiwanese independence movement, which grew in reaction to subsequent Nationalist (KMT) authoritarian rule in Taiwan following the surrender of Japan (the February 28 incident in 1947 began the turning point). There were indigenous Taiwanese who worked in Japan's defense and war-related industries in Taiwan that abetted Japan's war efforts. Many Taiwanese served in the Japanese military, including units that fought in China, resulting in the combat deaths of nearly 30,000. The future President, Lee Teng-hui (a future Kuomintang member) was one of those willingly volunteered into the Japanese army.

After the surrender, Taiwan and the Penghu islands were put under the administrative control of the Republic of China (ROC) government in 1945 by the United Nations Relief and Rehabilitation Administration. The ROC proclaimed Taiwan Retrocession Day on 25 October 1945. However, due to the unresolved Chinese Civil War, neither the newly established People's Republic of China in mainland China nor the Nationalist ROC that retreated to Taiwan was invited to sign the Treaty of San Francisco, as neither had shown full and complete legal capacity to enter into an international legally binding agreement. Since both the ROC and PRC were not present, the Japanese only formally renounced the territorial sovereignty of Taiwan and Penghu islands without specifying to which country Japan relinquished the sovereignty, and the treaty was signed in 1951 and came into force in 1952.

In 1952, the Treaty of Taipei was signed separately between the ROC and Japan that basically followed the same guideline of the Treaty of San Francisco, not specifying which country has sovereignty over Taiwan. However, Article 10 of the treaty states that the Taiwanese people and the juridical person should be the people and the juridical person of the ROC. Both the PRC and ROC governments base their claims to Taiwan on the Japanese Instrument of Surrender which specifically accepted the Potsdam Declaration which refers to the Cairo Declaration.

Disputes over the precise de jure sovereign of Taiwan persist to the present. On a de facto basis, sovereignty over Taiwan has been and continues to be exercised by the ROC. Japan's position has been to avoid commenting on Taiwan's status, maintaining that Japan renounced all claims to sovereignty over its former colonial possessions after World War II, including Taiwan.

Traditionally, the Republic of China government has held celebrations marking the Victory Day on 9 September (now known as Armed Forces Day) and Taiwan's Retrocession Day on 25 October. However, after the Democratic Progressive Party (DPP) won the presidential election in 2000, these national holidays commemorating the war have been cancelled as the pro-independent DPP does not see the relevancy of celebrating events that happened in mainland China. Meanwhile, many KMT supporters, particularly veterans who retreated with the government in 1949, still have an emotional interest in the war. For example, in celebrating the 60th anniversary of the end of war in 2005, the cultural bureau of KMT stronghold Taipei held a series of talks in the Sun Yat-sen Memorial Hall regarding the war and post-war developments, while the KMT held its own exhibit in the KMT headquarters. Whereas the KMT won the presidential election in 2008, the ROC government resumed commemorating the war. The last and only time Taiwan held a military parade specifically to mark the end of World War II was in July 2015 under a KMT administration.

== See also ==
- Army groups of the National Revolutionary Army
- Aviation Martyrs' Cemetery
- China in the Second Sino-Japanese War
- Chinese women in the Second Sino-Japanese War
- Chinese Muslims in the Second Sino-Japanese War
- Combatants of the Second Sino-Japanese War
- Japan during World War II
- Japanese war crimes
- List of military engagements of the Second Sino-Japanese War
- Mao Zedong thanking Japan controversy
- Northeast Anti-Japanese United Army
- The Battle of China – a film from the Why We Fight propaganda film series
- Works about the Second Sino-Japanese War
- Timeline of events leading to World War II in Asia
- Timeline of events preceding World War II
- War crimes in World War II#Crimes perpetrated by Japan
- World War II by country#China
- World War II casualties#Total deaths by country
