= Xiaochang'an =

Xiaochang'an 小长安镇
- Town
- Location in Guangxi
- Coordinates: 24°53′00″N 109°02′45″E
- Country: People's Republic of China
- Autonomous region: Guangxi
- Prefecture-level city: Hechi
- Autonomous county: Luocheng Mulao Autonomous County
- Incorporated (township): 1935
- Designated (town): 1993

Area
  - Total: 255.18 km^{2} (98.53 sq mi)

Population (2019)
  - Total: 40,191
  - Density: 157.50/km^{2} (407.92/sq mi)
- Time zone: UTC+08:00 (China Standard)
- Postal code: 546414
- Area code: 0778

Chinese name
- Simplified Chinese: 小长安镇
- Traditional Chinese: 小長安鎮
- Literal meaning: Small Chang'an Town
Transcriptions
Standard Mandarin
- Hanyu Pinyin: Xiǎocháng'ān Zhèn

Xiaochang'an (Chinese: 小长安镇) is a town in Luocheng Mulao Autonomous County, Guangxi, China. As of the 2019 census it had a population of 40,191 and an area of 255.18-square-kilometre (98.53 sq mi).

== Administrative division ==
As of 2021, the town is divided into one community and eleven villages:

- Chang'an Community (长安社区)
- Gui'an (归安村)
- Shuanghe (双合村)
- Longteng (龙腾村)
- Hebei (合北村)
- Luodong (罗东村)
- Shoushan (守善村)
- Niubi (牛毕村)
- Xiawu (下梧村)
- Minzu (民族村)
- Lixin (立新村)
- Shuangmeng (双蒙村)

== History ==
It was incorporated as a township in 1935, during the Republic of China.

Its name was changed to the "First District" in 1950 and soon renamed "Xiaochang'an District". In 1958, it was renamed "Xiaochang'an People's Commune". It became a township in 1984 and was upgraded to a town in 1993.

== Geography ==
The town is located in the northeast of Luocheng Mulao Autonomous County. It is surrounded by Rongshui Miao Autonomous County on the north and east, the towns of Dongmen and Huangjin on the west, and Liucheng County on the south.

The Wuyang River (武阳江河) flows through the town.

== Economy ==
The local economy is primarily based upon agriculture. Significant crops include rice and corn. Sugarcane, peanut, rape are its only cash crops.

== Demographics ==
Historical population
Year	Pop.	±%
2011	38,038	—
2019	40,191	+5.7%

In 2019, Xiaochang'an had a total population of 40,191 over the whole town.

== Transportation ==
The China National Highway 357 passes across the town.

The Provincial Highway S204 is an east–west highway in the town.

The Jiaozuo–Liuzhou railway passes across the town.
