= Siba, Luocheng County =

Siba 四把镇
- Town
- Location in Guangxi
- Coordinates: 24°43′51″N 108°48′37″E
- Country: People's Republic of China
- Autonomous region: Guangxi
- Prefecture-level city: Hechi
- Autonomous county: Luocheng Mulao Autonomous County
- Incorporated (township): 1925
- Designated (town): 1992

Area
  - Total: 291.33 km^{2} (112.48 sq mi)

Population (2019)
  - Total: 56,986
  - Density: 195.61/km^{2} (506.62/sq mi)
- Time zone: UTC+08:00 (China Standard)
- Postal code: 546404
- Area code: 0778

Chinese name
- Simplified Chinese: 四把镇
- Traditional Chinese: 四把鎮
Transcriptions
Standard Mandarin
- Hanyu Pinyin: Sìbǎ Zhèn

Siba (Chinese: 四把镇) is a town in Luocheng Mulao Autonomous County, Guangxi, China. As of the 2019 census it had a population of 56,986 and an area of 291.33-square-kilometre (112.48 sq mi).

== Administrative division ==
As of 2021, the town is divided into three communities and twenty-one villages:

- Siba Community (四把社区)
- Xiali Community (下里社区)
- Lining Community (里宁社区)
- Xinyin (新印村)
- Daxin (大新村)
- Siping (思平村)
- Simin (思民村)
- Si'ai (思爱村)
- Deneng (德能村)
- Shimen (石门村)
- Longma (龙马村)
- Shuangzhai (双寨村)
- Dashan (大山村)
- Dimen (地门村)
- Gantang (甘棠村)
- Jihuan (集环村)
- Mianhua (棉花村)
- Lisheng (里胜村)
- Lile (里乐村)
- Lijiang (里江村)
- Ma'an (马安村)
- Changchun (长春村)
- Xin'an (新安村)
- Datong (大同村)

== History ==
Silu Township (思禄乡) was set up in 1925 during the Republic of China.

In 1952, it was renamed "Siba Township" (四把乡). Its name was changed to "Siba People's Commune" (四把人民公社) in August 1958. It reverted to its former name of "Siba Township" in October 1984. In 1992 it was upgraded to a town. In August 2005, Xiali Township (下里乡) was merged into the town.

== Geography ==
The town is situated at the southwest of Luocheng Mulao Autonomous County, bordering Tianhe to the west, Yizhou District to the south, and Dongmen to the east and north.

The Longtan Reservoir (龙潭水库; 'Dragon Pond Reservoir') is located in the town, covering a total catchment area of 30.5 km^{2} (11.8 sq mi) and has a storage capacity of some 7,620,000 m^{3} (269,000,000 cu ft) of water.

The town experiences a subtropical monsoon climate, with an average annual temperature of 18.9 °C (66.0 °F), total annual rainfall of 1,567-millimetre (61.7 in), a frost-free period of 320 days and annual average sunshine hours in 1402.5 hours.

== Economy ==
The economy of the town is largest based on agriculture, including farming and pig-breeding. Significant crops include rice, corn, and soybean. Commercial crops include sugarcane, cassava, and tobacco.

== Demographics ==
Historical population
Year	Pop.	±%
2011	55,843	—
2019	56,986	+2.0%

The 2019 census showed the town's population to be 56,986, an increase of 2.0% from the 2011 census.

== Tourist attractions ==
The town is rich in cultural traditions. It is also the hometown for many celebrities. The Former Residence of Wei Yiping (韦一平故居) is a popular attraction in the town to commemorate Wei Yiping, a Communist martyr who died while crossing the Yangtze River in October 1945. The Birthplace of Liu Sanjie (刘三姐出生地) is a well known tourist spot, named after Liu Sanjie, a legendary figure of Zhuang people in Guangxi.

== Transportation ==
The Provincial Highway S204 passes across the town.
