= Jian'ai Township =

Jian'ai Township 兼爱乡
- Township
- Location in Guangxi
- Coordinates: 24°54′28″N 108°33′48″E
- Country: People's Republic of China
- Autonomous region: Guangxi
- Prefecture-level city: Hechi
- Autonomous county: Luocheng Mulao Autonomous County

Area
  - Total: 197.48 km^{2} (76.25 sq mi)

Population (2019)
  - Total: 14,698
  - Density: 74.428/km^{2} (192.77/sq mi)
- Time zone: UTC+08:00 (China Standard)
- Postal code: 546416
- Area code: 0778

Chinese name
- Simplified Chinese: 兼爱乡
- Traditional Chinese: 兼愛鄉
Transcriptions
Standard Mandarin
- Hanyu Pinyin: Jiān'ài Xiāng

Jian'ai Township (Chinese: 兼爱乡) is a township in Luocheng Mulao Autonomous County, Guangxi, China. As of the 2019 census it had a population of 14,698 and an area of 197.48-square-kilometre (76.25 sq mi).

== Administrative division ==
As of 2021, the township is divided into one community and ten villages:

- Daban Community (大板社区)
- Zhen'an (镇安村)
- Ganfeng (甘逢村)
- Danxing (旦兴村)
- Jian'ai (兼爱村)
- Dilong (地龙村)
- Zhenxin (振新村)
- Qing'an (庆安村)
- Dazhu (大竹村)
- Dingxin (顶新村)
- Donghang (洞杭村)

== History ==
The region came under the jurisdiction of Tianhe County (天河县) during the Qing dynasty (1644–1911).

In 1925 during the Republic of China, Huaiqun Township (怀群乡) was set up.

After establishment of the Communist State, in 1952, it belonged to the Fifth District. In August 1958, its name was changed to Huaiqun People's Commune (怀群人民公社). In October 1984, Huaiqun People's Commune was revoked and Jian'ai Township was incorporated as a township.

== Geography ==
The township is situated at the northwest of Luocheng Mulao Autonomous County. It is surrounded by Yizhou District and Huanjiang Maonan Autonomous County on the northwest, Naweng Township on the east, and Huaiqun Town on the south.

There are two rivers in the township: Jiujiang River (九江河) and Qiexing River (且兴河).

== Economy ==
The economy of the township is strongly based on agriculture, including farming and pig-breeding. The main crops of the region are rice, followed by corn and soybean. Sugarcane and cassava are the economic plants of this region.

== Demographics ==
Historical population
Year	Pop.	±%
2011	14,326	—
2019	14,698	+2.6%

The 2019 census showed the township's population to be 14,698, an increase of 2.6% from the 2011 census.
