= Zhang Xiulong =

Chinese politician (born 1958)

- 张秀隆

Vice Chairperson of the Guangxi People's Congress
- In office January 2018 – January 2022
- Chairperson: Peng Qinghua; Lu Xinshe; Liu Ning

Vice Chairman of Guangxi Zhuang Autonomous Regional People's Government
- In office January 2015 – January 2018
- Chairman: Chen Wu

Vice Chairman of the Guangxi Regional Committee of the Chinese People's Political Consultative Conference
- In office January 2013 – January 2015
- Chairman: Chen Jiwa

Personal details
- Born: May 1958 (age 68) Huaihua, Hunan, China
- Party: Chinese Communist Party (1976–2024; expelled)
- Education: Central Party School of the Chinese Communist Party

Chinese name
- Simplified Chinese: 张秀隆
- Traditional Chinese: 張秀隆
Transcriptions
Standard Mandarin
- Hanyu Pinyin: Zhāng Xiùlóng

Zhang Xiulong (Chinese: 张秀隆; born May 1958) is a former Chinese politician who spent his entire career in southwest China's Guangxi. He was investigated by China's top anti-graft agency in October 2023. He has been retired for a year. Previously he served as vice chairperson of the Guangxi People's Congress, vice chairman of Guangxi Zhuang Autonomous Regional People's Government, and before that, vice chairman of the Guangxi Regional Committee of the Chinese People's Political Consultative Conference.

He was a delegate to the 10th and 11th National People's Congress. He was a representative of the 18th National Congress of the Chinese Communist Party.

== Career ==
Zhang was born in Huaihua, Hunan, in May 1958. He entered the workforce in October 1975, and joined the Chinese Communist Party (CCP) in October 1976.

He became a sent-down youth in Tian'e County after middle school. He was an official in the Organization Department of CCP Tian'e County Committee before being appointed party secretary of Xiangyang Town. He was transferred to the Organization Department of CCP Hechi Municipal Committee in December 1986 and ultimately being appointed deputy secretary-general of the CCP Hechi Municipal Committee. He was party secretary of Bama Yao Autonomous County in March 1993 at the age of 35. He became the youngest man to hold that office. During his tenure, he vigorously promoted the health industry, making Bama Yao Autonomous County a renowned hometown of longevity in China.

He was appointed deputy party secretary and mayor of Nanning Prefecture (now Chongzuo) in June 1998 before being assigned to the similar position in Guilin in January 2006.

He was made party secretary of Laibin in January 2008, in addition to serving as chairperson of the People's Congress. His first foray into a prefectural leadership role. During his term in office, he undertook major improvements to the city's water source irrigation, transforming Laibin, which was originally lacking in water, into a city with abundant water sources.

He took the position of vice chairman of the Guangxi Regional Committee of the Chinese People's Political Consultative Conference, the provincial advisory body, in January 2013. In January 2015, he was selected as vice chairman of Guangxi Zhuang Autonomous Regional People's Government. In January 2018, he was chosen as vice chairperson of Guangxi's top legislative body - the Guangxi People's Congress.

== Downfall ==
21 October 2023, he has been placed under investigation for "serious violations of laws and regulations" by the Central Commission for Discipline Inspection (CCDI), the party's internal disciplinary body, and the National Supervisory Commission, the highest anti-corruption agency of China. His deputis in Laibin, Yu Zhiping (余治平) and Mo Hua (莫桦) were sacked for graft in 2002 and 2003, respectively.

On 22 April 2024, he was expelled from the CCP and dismissed from public office. On May 8, he was arrested by the Supreme People's Procuratorate for suspected bribe taking. On August 7, he was indicted on suspicion of accepting bribes. On November 8, he stood trial at the Intermediate People's Court of Changde on charges of taking bribes, he was charged of taking advantage of his various positions in Guangxi between 2001 and 2023 to seek benefits for others in project contracting, business operation, and job adjustment, in return, he accepted over 41 million million yuan ($5.78 million) worth of money and valuables personally or through his family members.

On 8 January 2025, Zhang was sentenced to 13 years and fined 3 million yuan for taking bribes, the money and property that Zhang had received in the form of bribes, as well as any interest arising from them, will be turned over to the national treasury.

Government offices
Preceded by Mo Jun (莫军)	Mayor of Nanning Prefecture; 2000–2003	Succeeded by Position revoked
Preceded by New position	Mayor of Chongzuo; 2003–2006	Succeeded by Xiao Hua
Preceded by Wang Yuefei	Mayor of Guilin; 2006–2008	Succeeded by Li Zhigang (李志刚)
Party political offices
Preceded by Qin Ruixiang	Communist Party Secretary of Laibin; 2008–2013	Succeeded by Li Zhigang (李志刚)
