= Huangjin, Guangxi =

Huangjin 黄金镇
- Town
- Location in Guangxi
- Coordinates: 24°57′40″N 108°54′50″E
- Country: People's Republic of China
- Autonomous region: Guangxi
- Prefecture-level city: Hechi
- Autonomous county: Luocheng Mulao Autonomous County
- Incorporated (township): 1984
- Designated (town): 1994

Area
  - Total: 176.39 km^{2} (68.10 sq mi)

Population (2019)
  - Total: 24,940
  - Density: 141.4/km^{2} (366.2/sq mi)
- Time zone: UTC+08:00 (China Standard)
- Area code: 0778
- Geocode: 546411

Chinese name
- Simplified Chinese: 黄金镇
- Traditional Chinese: 黃金鎮
- Literal meaning: Gold Town
Transcriptions
Standard Mandarin
- Hanyu Pinyin: Huángjīn Zhèn

Huangjin (Chinese: 黄金镇) is a town in Luocheng Mulao Autonomous County, Guangxi, China. As of the 2019 census it had a population of 24,940 and an area of 176.39-square-kilometre (68.10 sq mi).

== Etymology ==
The town's name "Huangjin" literally translates to "gold", a name received as the region once produced gold in ancient times.

== Administrative division ==
As of 2021, the town is divided into one community and seven villages:

- Huangjin Community (黄金社区)
- Simen (寺门村)
- Baoju (宝聚村)
- Zhaibei (寨碑村)
- Zhaidao (寨道村)
- Yihe (义和村)
- Beisheng (北盛村)
- Youdong (友洞村)

== History ==
Huangjin District (黄金区) was founded in 1925 during the Republic of China.

In 1958, the region split into two communes: Simen People's Commune (寺门人民公社) and Huangjin People's Commune (黄金人民公社), and Simen People's Commune merged into Huangjin People's Commune four years later. Its name was changed to Huangjin Township (黄金乡) in October 1984 and it was upgraded to a town in 1993.

== Geography ==
It lies at the northeast of Luocheng Mulao Autonomous County, bordering Qiaoshan Township to the west, the town of Dongmen to the south, Baotan Township to the north, and the town of Long'an to the east.

The highest point in the town is Qingming Mountain (青明山) which stands 1,458 metres (4,783 ft) above sea level.

There are two rivers flow through the town: Wuyang River (武阳江) and Huangjin River (黄金大河).

== Economy ==
The town's economy is based on agriculture and animal husbandry. Significant crops include rice and corn. Sugarcane, peanut, rape are the economic plants of this region.

== Demographics ==
Historical population
Year	Pop.	±%
2011	22,458	—
2019	24,940	+11.1%

The 2019 census reported the town had a population of 24,940.
