= Jinchengjiang railway station =

Railway station in Hechi, Guangxi

Jinchengjiang 金城江
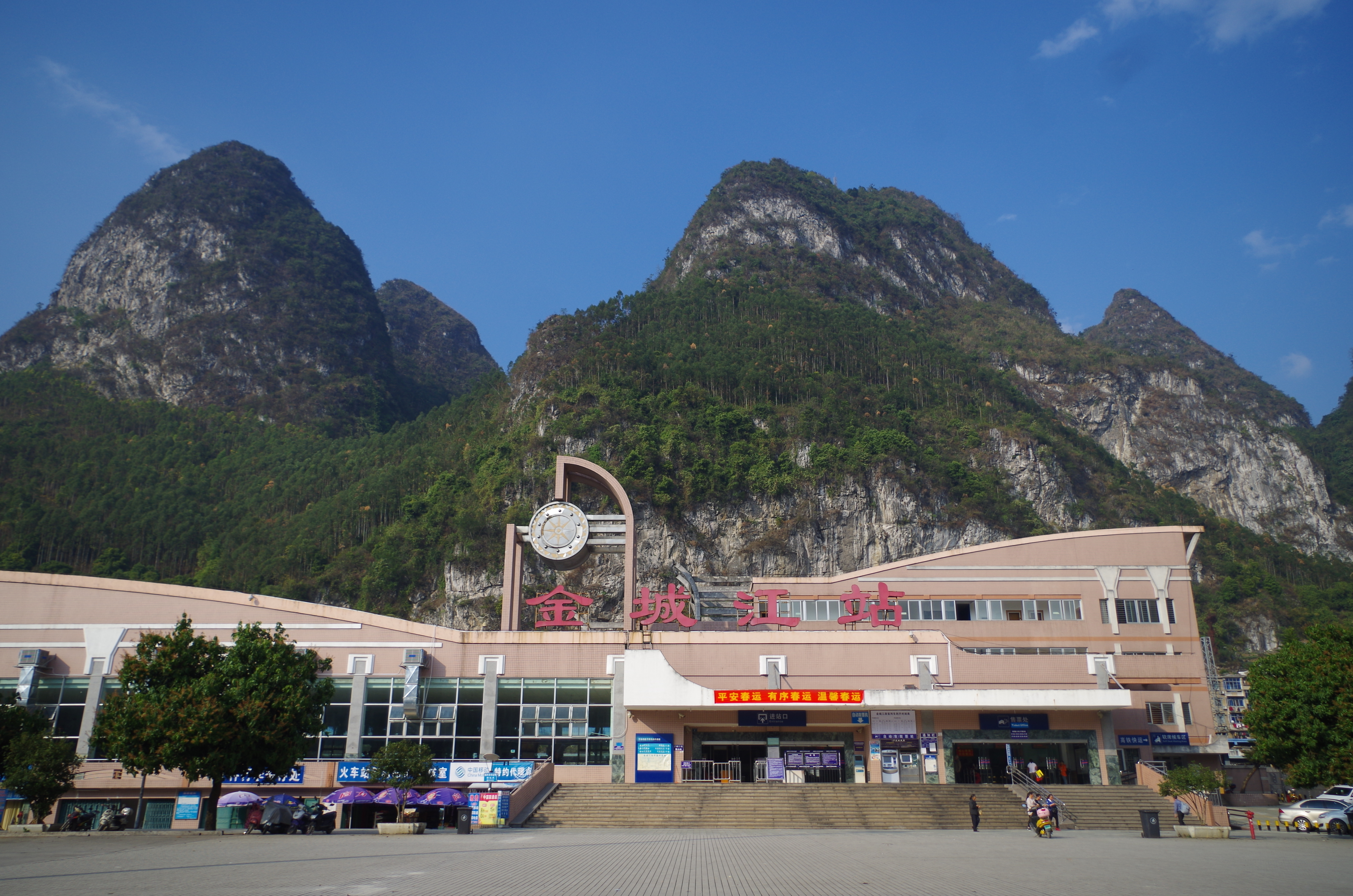

General information
- Location: Jinchengjiang District, Hechi, Guangxi; China
- Coordinates: 24°42′0″N 108°3′57.7″E
- Line(s): Guizhou–Guangxi railway

Jinchengjiang railway station (Chinese: 金城江站) is a railway station in Jinchengjiang District, Hechi, Guangxi, China.

On 7 September 2007 a project to rebuild the station was started.

Preceding station	China Railway	Following station
Nandan towards Guiyang	Guizhou–Guangxi railway	Yizhou towards Liuzhou
