= Qiaoshan Township =

Qiaoshan Township 乔善乡
- Township
- Location in Guangxi
- Coordinates: 24°51′23″N 108°43′29″E
- Country: People's Republic of China
- Autonomous region: Guangxi
- Prefecture-level city: Hechi
- Autonomous county: Luocheng Mulao Autonomous County
- Incorporated (township): 1934

Area
  - Total: 145.37 km^{2} (56.13 sq mi)

Population (2019)
  - Total: 20,843
  - Density: 143.38/km^{2} (371.35/sq mi)
- Time zone: UTC+08:00 (China Standard)
- Postal code: 546409
- Area code: 0778

Chinese name
- Simplified Chinese: 乔善乡
- Traditional Chinese: 喬善鄉
Transcriptions
Standard Mandarin
- Hanyu Pinyin: Qiáoshàn Xiāng

Qiaoshan Township (Chinese: 乔善乡) is a township in Luocheng Mulao Autonomous County, Guangxi, China. As of the 2019 census it had a population of 20,843 and an area of 145.37-square-kilometre (56.13 sq mi).

== Administrative division ==
As of 2021, the township is divided into one community and six villages:

- Qiaoshan Community (乔善社区)
- Qiaoben (乔本村)
- Gujin (古金村)
- Gucheng (古城村)
- Dacheng (大城村)
- Yankou (岩口村)
- Bantuan (板团村)

== History ==
The region belonged to three townships in 1934 during the Republic of China, namely Qiaoshan Township (乔善乡), Guluo Township (古罗乡) and Banshai Township (板晒乡).

After the founding of the Communist State, in 1950, its name was changed to the Third District and soon was renamed the Sixth District in 1952. In 1958, it split into three communes: Qiaoshan People's Commune (乔善人民公社), Banwen People's Commune (板文人民公社), and Gujin People's Commune (古金人民公社), and the three merged to form Qiaoshan District (乔善区) in 1962. It was incorporated as a township in 1984.

== Geography ==
The township lies at the northwest of Luocheng Mulao Autonomous County. It is surrounded by Baotan Township on the north, Huaqun Town and Naweng Township on the west, the towns of Dongmen and Huangjin on the east, and the town of Tianhe on the south.

There are two rivers in the township: Xinhua River (新华河) and Baotan River (宝坛河).

The township experiences a subtropical monsoon climate, with an average annual temperature of 28.5 °C (83.3 °F), total annual rainfall of 1,691-millimetre (66.6 in), a frost-free period of 320 days and annual average sunshine hours in 1575 hours.

== Economy ==
The economy of the township is strongly based on agriculture, including farming and pig-breeding. The main crops are rice and corn. Economic crops are mainly sugarcane and soybean.

== Demographics ==
Historical population
Year	Pop.	±%
2011	20,271	—
2019	20,843	+2.8%

The 2019 census reported the township had a population of 20,843.
