= Baotan Township =

Baotan Township 宝坛乡
- Township
- Location in Guangxi
- Coordinates: 24°58′11″N 108°46′59″E
- Country: People's Republic of China
- Autonomous region: Guangxi
- Prefecture-level city: Hechi
- Autonomous county: Luocheng Mulao Autonomous County
- Incorporated (township): 1984

Area
  - Total: 294.07 km^{2} (113.54 sq mi)

Population (2019)
  - Total: 21,389
  - Density: 72.734/km^{2} (188.38/sq mi)
- Time zone: UTC+08:00 (China Standard)
- Postal code: 546412
- Area code: 0778

Chinese name
- Simplified Chinese: 宝坛乡
- Traditional Chinese: 寶壇鄉
Transcriptions
Standard Mandarin
- Hanyu Pinyin: Bǎotán Xiāng

Baotan Township (Chinese: 宝坛乡) is a township in Luocheng Mulao Autonomous County, Guangxi, China. As of the 2019 census it had a population of 21,389 and an area of 294.07-square-kilometre (113.54 sq mi).

== Administrative division ==
As of 2021, the township is divided into one community and seven villages:

- Baotan Community (宝坛社区)
- Lalang (拉郎村)
- Sibao (四堡村)
- Zhuangdong (庄洞村)
- Xihua (西华村)
- Zhaicen (寨岑村)
- Wudi (五地村)
- Pingying (平英村)

== History ==
The region came under the jurisdiction of Sibao Township (四堡乡) in 1935 during the Republic of China.

After establishment of the Communist State, in 1950, it belonged to the Fourth District and soon belonged to the Eighth District in 1953. In 1958, it split into two communes: Sibao People's Commune (四堡人民公社) and Baotan People's Commune (宝坛人民公社), and merged into Huangjin District (黄金区) in 1962. It was incorporated as a township in 1984.

== Geography ==
The township is located at the northwest of Luocheng Mulao Autonomous County. It is bordered to the north by Rongshui Miao Autonomous County and Huanjiang Maonan Autonomous County, to the east by the towns of Huangjin and Long'an, to the south by Qiaoshan Township, and to the west by Naweng Township.

The highest point in the township is Qingming Mountain (青明山) which stands 1,458 metres (4,783 ft) above sea level.

There are two rivers in the township: Baotan River (宝坛河) and Sibao River (四堡河).

== Economy ==
The township's economy is based on nearby mineral resources and agricultural resources. The region abounds with nickel, tin, lead, zinc, antimony, silica, baryte, and crystal stone. The region mainly produce rice and corn. Economic crops are mainly sugarcane, cassava, and rapeseed. Mineral water production is also valuable to the local economy.

== Demographics ==
Historical population
Year	Pop.	±%
2011	20,342	—
2019	21,389	+5.1%

The 2019 census reported the township had a population of 21,389.
