= Tianhe, Guangxi =

Tianhe 天河镇
- Town
- Location in Guangxi
- Coordinates: 24°46′47″N 108°41′32″E
- Country: People's Republic of China
- Autonomous region: Guangxi
- Prefecture-level city: Hechi
- Autonomous county: Luocheng Mulao Autonomous County
- Incorporated (township): 1984
- Designated (town): 1992

Area
  - Total: 191.07 km^{2} (73.77 sq mi)

Population (2019)
  - Total: 22,788
  - Density: 119.27/km^{2} (308.90/sq mi)
- Time zone: UTC+08:00 (China Standard)
- Postal code: 546407
- Area code: 0778

Chinese name
- Simplified Chinese: 天河镇
- Traditional Chinese: 天河鎮
Transcriptions
Standard Mandarin
- Hanyu Pinyin: Tiānhé Zhèn

Tianhe (Chinese: 天河镇) is a town in Luocheng Mulao Autonomous County, Guangxi, China. As of the 2019 census it had a population of 22,788 and an area of 191.07-square-kilometre (73.77 sq mi).

== Administrative division ==
As of 2021, the town is divided into one community and fourteen villages:

- Tianhe Community (天河社区)
- Gubang (古邦村)
- Bairen (白任村)
- Jiaquan (佳泉村)
- Jinxin (进新村)
- Huazhang (华张村)
- Diaoshui (吊水村)
- Tunxiang (屯相村)
- Weixin (维新村)
- Beihua (北华村)
- Jinxing (金星村)
- Jincheng (金城村)
- Bei'an (北安村)
- Jicheng (集城村)
- Shangchao (上朝村)

== History ==
The region historically known as "Tianhe County" (天河县) in ancient times.

It was controlled by the People's Liberation Army (PLA) on 11 February 1950 and came under the jurisdiction of Yishan Special District (宜山专区). Tianhe County was revoked on 23 April 1953 and merged into Luocheng County. In 1958, it was renamed "Tianhe People's Commune" (天河人民公社). It was incorporated as a township in 1984 and was upgraded to a town in August 1992.

== Geography ==
The town is situated at the west of Luocheng Mulao Autonomous County. It is surrounded by Qiaoshan Township on the north, Huaiqun Town on the west, Siba Town on the east, and Yizhou District on the south.

The highest point in the town is Liushe Mountain (六社山), which, at 826 metres (2,710 ft) above sea level.

The Xiaolong River (小龙江; 'Little Dragon River') flows through the town.

=== Climate ===
The town is in the subtropical monsoon climate zone, with an average annual temperature of 25.6 °C (78.1 °F), total annual rainfall of 1,441.7-millimetre (56.76 in), a frost-free period of 320 days and annual average sunshine hours in 1403 hours.

== Economy ==
The economy of the town is strongly based on agriculture, including farming and pig-breeding. The main crops are rice and corn. Economic crops are mainly rapeseed and vegetable.

== Demographics ==
Historical population
Year	Pop.	±%
2011	23,169	—
2019	22,788	−1.6%

The 2019 census showed the town's population to be 22,788, a decrease of −1.6% from the 2011 census.
