= Liucheng =

Liucheng can refer to many places in China:

- Liucheng County (柳城县), Guangxi Zhuang Autonomous Region
- Liucheng, Xinjiang (柳城), Xinjiang Province, which was also known as Lukchak
- Chaoyang, Liaoning (朝阳市), Liaoning Province, which was called Liucheng (柳城) in the Three Kingdoms period of Chinese history
- Liuchengzhen (柳城镇), Dongyuan County, Guangdong Province
