= Dongmen, Luocheng County =

Dongmen 东门镇
- Town
- Location in Guangxi
- Coordinates: 24°46′54″N 108°53′53″E
- Country: People's Republic of China
- Autonomous region: Guangxi
- Prefecture-level city: Hechi
- Autonomous county: Luocheng Mulao Autonomous County
- Incorporated (township): 1952
- Designated (town): 1991

Area
  - Total: 385.24 km^{2} (148.74 sq mi)

Population (2019)
  - Total: 101,483
  - Density: 263.43/km^{2} (682.28/sq mi)
- Time zone: UTC+08:00 (China Standard)
- Postal code: 546499
- Area code: 0771

Chinese name
- Simplified Chinese: 东门镇
- Traditional Chinese: 東門鎮
- Literal meaning: East Gate Town
Transcriptions
Standard Mandarin
- Hanyu Pinyin: Dōngmén Zhèn

Dongmen (Chinese: 东门镇) is a town and the county seat in Luocheng Mulao Autonomous County, Guangxi, China. As of the 2019 census it had a population of 101,483 and an area of 385.24-square-kilometre (148.74 sq mi).

== Administrative division ==
As of 2021, the town is divided into 5 communities and 16 villages:

- Fenghuang Community (凤凰社区)
- Shizishan Community (狮子山社区)
- Baima Community (白马社区)
- Wulixiang Community (五里香社区)
- Qiaotou Community (桥头社区)
- Chongdong (冲洞村)
- Dajing (大境村)
- Sanjia (三家村)
- Yantang (燕塘村)
- Dafu (大福村)
- Le'e (勒俄村)
- Guyao (古耀村)
- Deyin (德音村)
- Pingluo (平洛村)
- Zhangluo (章罗村)
- Yong'an (永安村)
- Fengwu (凤梧村)
- Heng'an (横岸村)
- Zhongshi (中石村)
- Youdong (佑洞村)
- Dongyong (东勇村)
- Nongda (弄达村)
- Longshan (龙山村)
- Rongmu (榕木村)

== History ==
Luocheng Mulao Autonomous County was controlled by the People's Liberation Army (PLA) on 23 November 1949 and Dongmen became county seat. It was renamed "Dongmen Township" (东门乡) in 1952. The Dongmen People's Commune (东门人民公社) was established in 1968. In November 1984, Dongmen People's Commune was revoked and split into two townships, namely Dongmen Township and Qiaotou Township (桥头乡). The two townships were merged and was officially renamed "Dongmen Town" (东门镇) in October 1991. In August 2005, Qiaotou Town (桥头镇) was formally merged into the town.

== Geography ==
The town lies at the southeastern of Luocheng Mulao Autonomous County, bordering Siba Town to the west, Liucheng County to the south, Huangjin Town to the north, and Xiaochang'an Town to the east.

=== Climate ===
The town is in the subtropical monsoon climate zone, with an average annual temperature of 19 °C (66 °F), total annual rainfall of 1,602-millimetre (63.1 in), a frost-free period of 303 days and annual average sunshine hours in 1361.7 hours.

== Economy ==
The town's economy is based on agricultural resources and commerce. The main crops are rice and corn. Sugarcane and cassava are the economic plants of the town. Livestock husbandry mainly focuses on raising pigs, cattle and poultry.

== Demographics ==
Historical population
Year	Pop.	±%
2011	96,600	—
2019	101,483	+5.1%

In 2019, Dongmen had a total population of 101,483 over the whole town.

== Tourist attractions ==
The Martyrs' Cemetery (烈士陵园) is a popular attraction in the town, which was built in 1957 at the foot of Phoenix Mountain (凤凰山) to commemorate Zou Yanzhao (邹燕兆) and Yang Guanghui (杨光辉) and other 12 Communist martyrs.

The Kaiyuan Temple (开元寺) is a Buddhist temple in the town and has been designated as a county level cultural relic preservation organ.

== Transportation ==
The town is crossed by the Chaluo railway (岔罗铁路).

The China National Highway 357 passes across the town.

Two public parks are located in the town: Chenglonghu Park (成龙湖公园) and Luocheng Park (罗城公园).
