= Jinchengjiang District =

Jinchengjiang 金城江区 · Ginghcwngzgyangh Gih
- District
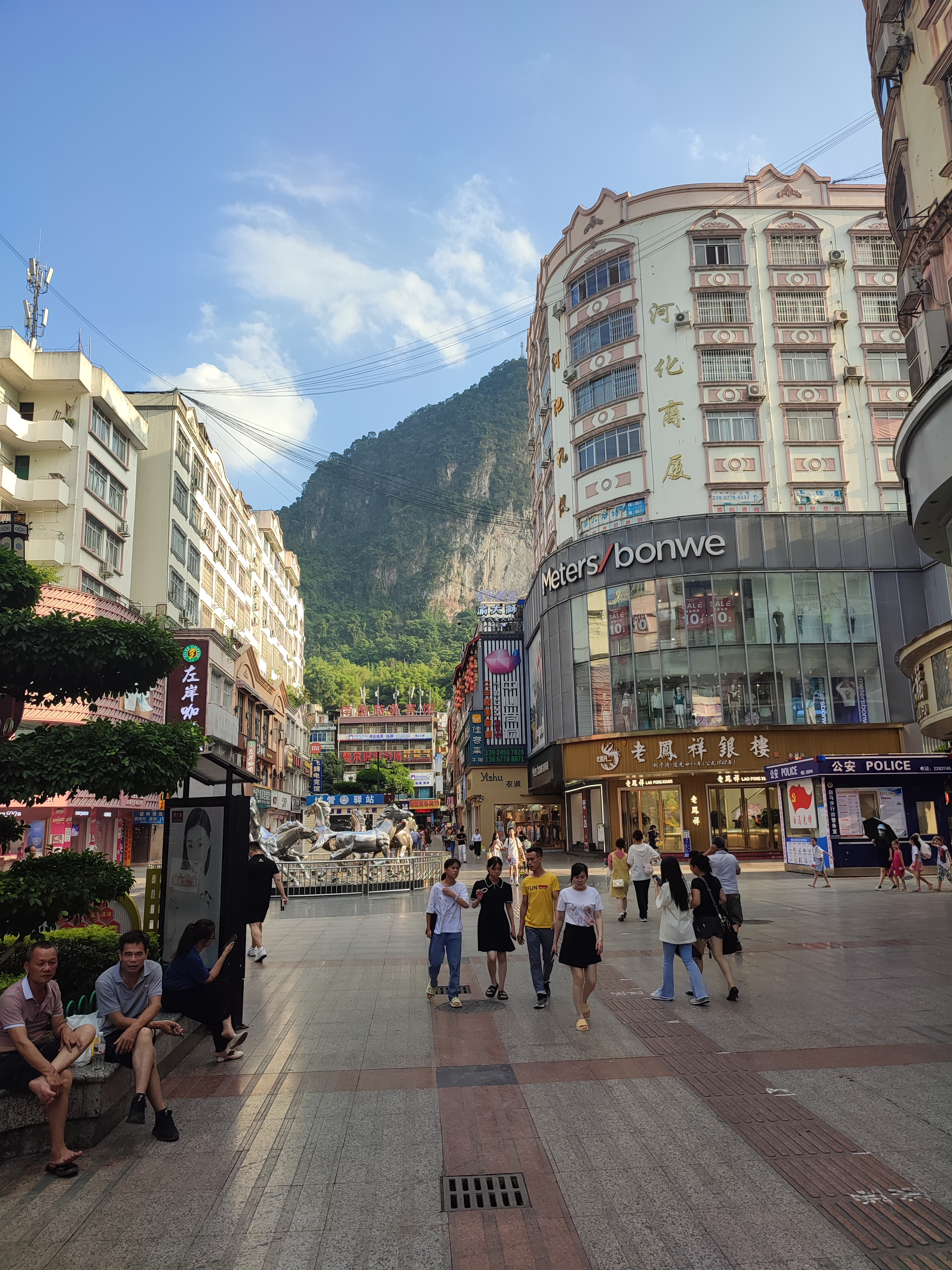
- Baimajie street in Jinchengjiang

- Location in Guangxi
- Coordinates: 24°41′24″N 108°02′13″E
- Country: China
- Autonomous region: Guangxi
- Prefecture-level city: Hechi
- Township-level divisions: 1 subdistrict 7 towns 4 townships
- District seat: Jinchengjiang Subdistrict

Area
  - Total: 2,340 km^{2} (900 sq mi)
- Elevation: 200 m (660 ft)

Population (2020 census)
  - Total: 372,521
  - Density: 159/km^{2} (412/sq mi)
- Time zone: UTC+8 (China Standard)
- Website: www.jcj.gov.cn

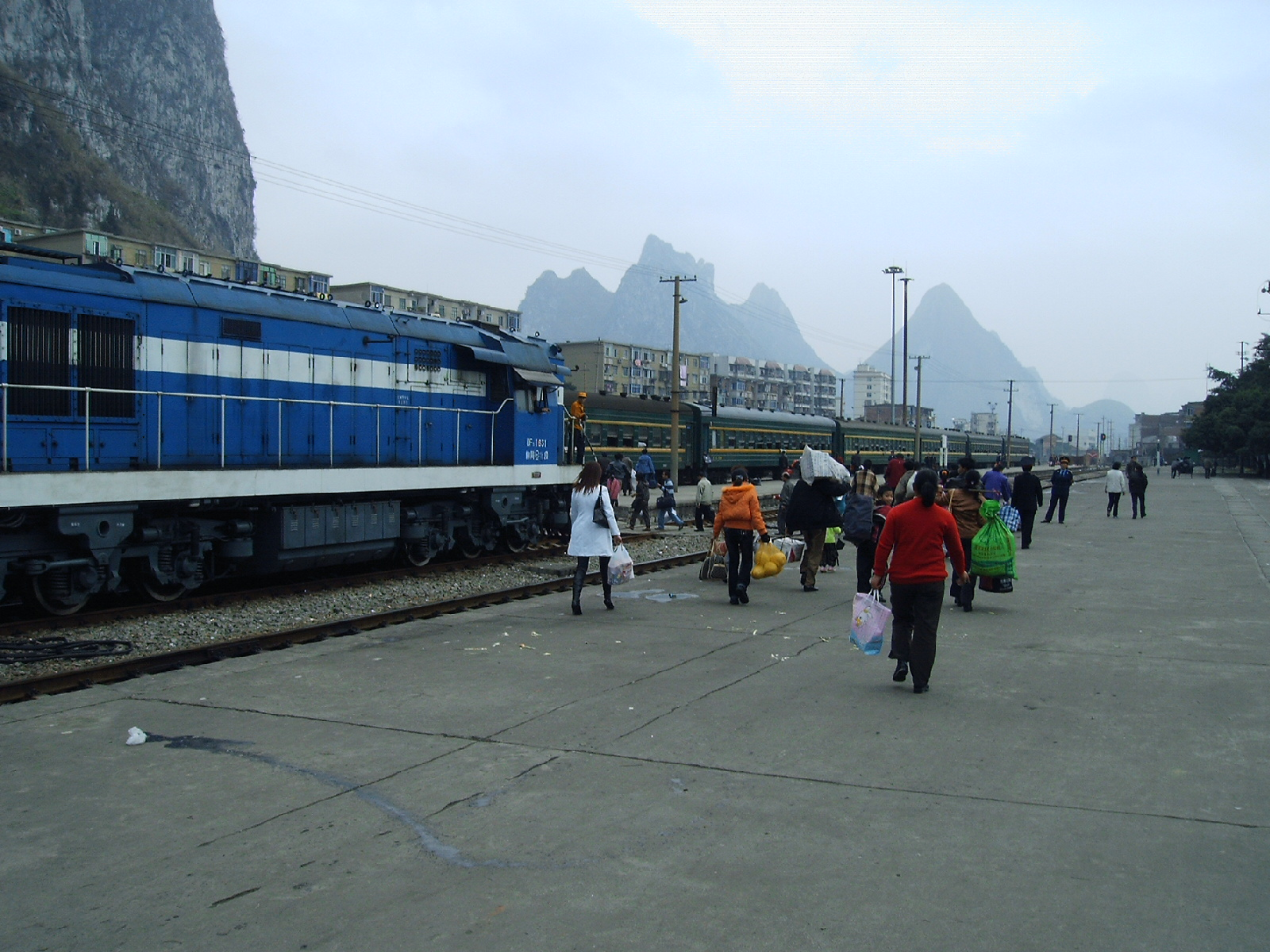
Jinchengjiang railway station

Jinchengjiang (Chinese: 金城江; pinyin: Jīnchéngjiāng; lit. 'gold city river') is a district of Hechi, Guangxi, China. Its previous name was Hechi City before being changed in 2002. It used to be the capital and district seat of Hechi before it got moved to Yizhou in 2016.

== Administrative divisions ==
Jinchengjiang District is divided into 1 subdistrict, 7 towns, and 4 townships:

The only subdistrict is Jinchengjiang Subdistrict (金城江街道)

Towns:

- Dongjiang (东江镇), Liuxu (六圩镇), Liujia (六甲镇), Hechi Town (河池镇), Bagong (拔贡镇), Jiuxu (九圩镇), Wuxu (五圩镇)

Townships:

- Baitu Township (白土乡), Celing Township (侧岭乡), Baoping Township (保平乡), Changlao Township (长老乡)

== Transportation ==
- Hechi Jinchengjiang Airport
- Guizhou–Guangxi Railway (Jinchengjiang railway station)
