= Qingyuan (disambiguation) =

Qingyuan (清远市) is a prefecture-level city of Guangdong province, People's Republic of China (PRC).

Qingyuan may refer to these other locations in the PRC:

- Mount Qingyuan (清源山), national park near Quanzhou, Fujian

== Districts ==
- Qingyuan District, Baoding (清苑区), Baoding, Hebei
- Qingyuan District, Ji'an (青原区), Ji'an, Jiangxi

== Counties ==
- Qingyuan County, Guangdong, the former name of the present Qingyuan Prefecture
- Qingyuan County, Zhejiang (庆元县)
- Qingyuan Manchu Autonomous County (清原满族自治县)

== Subdistricts ==
Written as "青园街道":

- Qingyuan Subdistrict, Shijiazhuang, in Chang'an District, Shijiazhuang, Hebei
- Qingyuan, Changsha, in Tianxin District, Changsha, Hunan

Written as "清源街道":

- Qingyuan Subdistrict, Beijing, in Daxing District
- Qingyuan Subdistrict, Quanzhou, in Fengze District, Quanzhou, Fujian

Written as "青源街道"

- Qingyuan Subdistrict, Tianjin, in Beichen District

== Towns ==
- Qingyuan, Hebei (清苑镇), in Qingyuan County
- Qingyuan, Heilongjiang (青原镇), in Baoqing County
- Qingyuan, Liaoning (清原镇), seat of Qingyuan County
- Qingyuan, Guangxi (庆远镇), in Yizhou

Written as "清源镇":

- Qingyuan, Dingxi, in Weiyuan County, Gansu
- Qingyuan, Wuwei, Gansu, in Liangzhou District
- Qingyuan, Shanxi, in Qingxu County
