= Long'an =

Long'an or variant may refer to:

== Places in China ==
=== Towns ===
- Long'an, Luocheng County (龙岸镇), town in Luocheng Mulao Autonomous County, Guangxi

Written as "龙安镇":

- Long'an, Jiangxi, town in Lichuan County
- Long'an, Xingye County, a town in Guangxi
- Long'an, Pingwu County, town in Sichuan

=== Townships ===
- Long'an Township, Sichuan (龙安乡), a township in Guang'an District, Guang'an
- Long'an Township (龙安乡), in Yiliang County, Zhaotong

=== Other places ===
- Long'an County (隆安县), Guangxi
- Long'an District (龙安区), Anyang, Henan

== Other uses ==
- Longan, an Asian fruit
- Long An Province, Vietnam
- Long An F.C., soccer club in Vietnam
- Long An Stadium, multipurpose stadium in Tân An, Long An, Vietnam

== See also ==
- Long (disambiguation)
- AN (disambiguation)
