= Long'an, Luocheng County =

Long'an 龙岸镇
- Town
- Location in Guangxi
- Coordinates: 25°02′14″N 109°00′02″E
- Country: People's Republic of China
- Autonomous region: Guangxi
- Prefecture-level city: Hechi
- Autonomous county: Luocheng Mulao Autonomous County
- Incorporated (township): 1933
- Designated (town): 1993

Area
  - Total: 370.46 km^{2} (143.04 sq mi)

Population (2020)
  - Total: 54,934
  - Density: 148.29/km^{2} (384.06/sq mi)
- Time zone: UTC+08:00 (China Standard)
- Postal code: 546413
- Area code: 0778

Chinese name
- Simplified Chinese: 龙岸镇
- Traditional Chinese: 龍岸鎮
Transcriptions
Standard Mandarin
- Hanyu Pinyin: Lóng'àn Zhèn

Long'an (Chinese: 龙岸镇) is a town in Luocheng Mulao Autonomous County, Guangxi, China. As of the 2019 census it had a population of 54,934 and an area of 370.46-square-kilometre (143.04 sq mi).

== Administrative division ==
As of 2021, the town is divided into one community and sixteen villages:

- Long'an Community (龙岸社区)
- Pingshi (平石村)
- Beiyuan (北源村)
- Tianbao (天宝村)
- Wuhua (物华村)
- Dameng (大蒙村)
- Taihe (太和村)
- Gao'an (高安村)
- Lianhua (莲花村)
- Longfeng (龙凤村)
- Longping (龙平村)
- Shankou (山口村)
- Sipan (泗潘村)
- Zhujiang (珠江村)
- Rongshan (榕山村)
- Sanling (三灵村)
- Balian (八联村)

== History ==
Long'an District (龙岸区) was set up in 1925 during the Republic of China. It was incorporated as a township in 1933.

In 1968, it was renamed "Long'an People's Commune" (龙岸人民公社) and reverted to its former name of "Long'an Township" in 1984. In January 1993 it was upgraded to a town.

== Geography ==
It is located on the northeast of Luocheng Mulao Autonomous County, bordering Baotan Township to the west, Huangjin to the south, Rongshui Miao Autonomous County to the north and east.

The Xiaoqing River (小清河) flows through the town.

The Dongkan Reservoir (洞坎水库) is the largest reservoir in Luocheng Mulao Autonomous County.

The Bangdong Reservoir (帮洞水库) is a reservoir in the town, providing drinking water and water for irrigation.

=== Climate ===
Long'an is in the subtropical monsoon climate zone, with an average annual temperature of 19.3 to 20.1 °C (66.7 to 68.2 °F), total annual rainfall of 1,783-millimetre (70.2 in), a frost-free period of 300 days and annual average sunshine hours in 13892 hours.

== Economy ==
The economy of the town has a predominantly agricultural orientation, including farming and pig-breeding. The main crops are rice and corn. Economic crops are mainly sugarcane and cassava.

== Demographics ==
Historical population
Year	Pop.	±%
2011	53,276	—
2019	54,934	+3.1%

The 2019 census reported the town had a population of 54,934.

== Tourist attractions ==
The Former Residence of Li Deshan (李德山故居) is a popular attraction, in memory of Li Deshan, one of the 72 martyrs in the Second Guangzhou Uprising.

There are two Buddhist temples in the town: Qingshan Temple and Anning Temple. Qingshan Temple (青山寺; 'Green Mountain Temple') is a Buddhist temple in the town with a history of over 1,000 years. Anning Temple (安宁寺; 'Temple of Peace') is also a Buddhist temple and originally built in 1589, during the ruling of Wanli Emperor of the Ming dynasty (1368–1644).
