= Wuxu =

Wuxu may refer to the following towns in China:

- Wuxu, Hechi (五圩镇), in Jinchengjiang District, Hechi, Guangxi
- Wuxu, Nanning (吴圩镇), in Jiangnan District, Nanning, Guangxi

== See also ==
- Nanning Wuxu International Airport, located in Wuxu, Nanning
- Hundred Days' Reform or Wuxu Reform, a 1898 reform movement in Qing China
