= Naweng Township =

Naweng Township 纳翁乡
- Township
- Location in Guangxi
- Coordinates: 24°57′23″N 108°41′29″E
- Country: People's Republic of China
- Autonomous region: Guangxi
- Prefecture-level city: Hechi
- Autonomous county: Luocheng Mulao Autonomous County
- Incorporated (township): 1984

Area
  - Total: 168.68 km^{2} (65.13 sq mi)

Population (2019)
  - Total: 3,975
  - Density: 23.57/km^{2} (61.03/sq mi)
- Time zone: UTC+08:00 (China Standard)
- Postal code: 546417
- Area code: 0778

Chinese name
- Simplified Chinese: 纳翁乡
- Traditional Chinese: 納翁鄉
Transcriptions
Standard Mandarin
- Hanyu Pinyin: Nàwēng Xiāng

Naweng Township (Chinese: 纳翁乡) is a township in Luocheng Mulao Autonomous County, Guangxi, China. As of the 2019 census it had a population of 3,975 and an area of 168.68-square-kilometre (65.13 sq mi).

== Administrative division ==
As of 2021, the township is divided into one community and five villages:

- Naweng Community (纳翁社区)
- Banyang (板阳村)
- Kencai (肯才村)
- Dongmin (洞敏村)
- Shefu (社甫村)
- Minzu (民族村)

== History ==
The region came under the jurisdiction of Tianhe County (天河县) during the Republic of China.

In 1968, it belonged to Qiaoshan People's Commune (乔善人民公社). It was incorporated as a township in 1984.

== Geography ==
The township lies at the northwest of Luocheng Mulao Autonomous County, bordering Jian'ai Township to the west, Qiaoshan Township to the south, Huanjiang Maonan Autonomous County to the northwest, and Baotan Township to the east.

The highest point in the township is Yuping Mountain (雨平山), which, at 1,468.9 metres (4,819 ft) above sea level. It is also the highest peak in the county.

=== Climate ===
The township experiences a subtropical monsoon climate, with an average annual temperature of 17 °C (63 °F), total annual rainfall of 1,602-millimetre (63.1 in), a frost-free period of 268 days and annual average sunshine hours in 1361.7 hours.

== Economy ==
The economy of the township has a predominantly agricultural orientation, including farming and pig-breeding. Significant crops include rice and corn. Cassava is one of the important economic crops in the region.

== Demographics ==
Historical population
Year	Pop.	±%
2011	6,467	—
2019	3,975	−38.5%

The 2019 census reported the township had a population of 3,975.
