= Yizhou riots =

2002 farmer protests in Yizhou, China

The Yizhou riots occurred in the fall of 2002.

== Description ==
Yizhou (宜州) is a county-level city located in Guangxi Zhuang Autonomous Region, in the southern part of the People's Republic of China. The city is home to several hundred thousand inhabitants, while the surrounding countryside is dotted with the villages of poor ethnic minority farmers. The backbone of Yizhou's economy is sugarcane production and thousands of farmers work the sugarcane fields for very low wages. As China's economy has opened to foreign competition the price of sugar has fallen, hurting the livelihood of local farmers.

The Yizhou riots occurred in fall of 2002. The local sugar processing plant had recently cut rates by twenty percent what it was paying farmers per ton of sugar cane. The riots began after local officials only partially paid farmers for their crops, claiming that they would make the total payments at a later date. In China, it is quite common for local officials to pocket wages and compensation money meant for workers. On 12 September farmers protested outside the local city hall. The protests soon got out of hand and rioters entered the building, smashed windows, threw chairs and desks from the building and damaged cars parked outside. Protesters also sat on the local railway line. Local officials agreed to pay the extra wages that had been promised. Afterwards, the police admitted to holding twenty farmers who participated in the riots. As with other anti-government actions in China, authorities censored the press coverage of the riots.
