= Huaiqun =

Huaiqun 怀群镇
- Town
- Location in Guangxi
- Coordinates: 24°50′15″N 108°34′12″E
- Country: People's Republic of China
- Autonomous region: Guangxi
- Prefecture-level city: Hechi
- Autonomous county: Luocheng Mulao Autonomous County
- Incorporated (township): 1925
- Designated (town): 1995

Area
  - Total: 171.19 km^{2} (66.10 sq mi)

Population (2019)
  - Total: 23,581
  - Density: 137.75/km^{2} (356.76/sq mi)
- Time zone: UTC+08:00 (China Standard)
- Postal code: 546408
- Area code: 0778

Chinese name
- Simplified Chinese: 怀群镇
- Traditional Chinese: 懷群鎮
Transcriptions
Standard Mandarin
- Hanyu Pinyin: Huáiqún Zhèn

Huaiqun (Chinese: 怀群镇) is a town in Luocheng Mulao Autonomous County, Guangxi, China. As of the 2019 census it had a population of 23,581 and an area of 171.19-square-kilometre (66.10 sq mi).

== Administrative division ==
As of 2021, the town is divided into one community and nine villages:

- Huaiqun Community (怀群社区)
- Dong'an (东安村)
- Si'an (泗岸村)
- Jianjiang (剑江村)
- Guogan (果敢村)
- Lundong (伦洞村)
- Jiawan (加碗村)
- Xiadong (虾洞村)
- Ziqiu (自求村)
- Gengyao (耕尧村)

== History ==
During the Qing dynasty (1644–1911), it was under the jurisdiction of Tianhe County.

It was incorporated as a township in 1925, during the Republic of China.

Its name was changed to the "Fifth District" in 1952 and then was renamed "Huaiqun People's Commune" (怀群人民公社) in August 1958. It became a township in October 1984 and was upgraded to a town in April 1995.

== Geography ==
The town is located at the west of Luocheng Mulao Autonomous County. The town shares a border with Yizhou District to the west, Jian'an Township to the north, and the town of Tianhe to the east and south.

The Kama Reservoir (卡马水库) is located at the north of the town, providing drinking water and water for irrigation for the town.

=== Climate ===
The town is in the subtropical monsoon climate zone, with an average annual temperature of 18.9 °C (66.0 °F), total annual rainfall of 1,567-millimetre (61.7 in), a frost-free period of 320 days and annual average sunshine hours in 1402.5 hours.

== Economy ==
The principal industries in the town are agriculture and mineral resources. The region mainly produces rice, corn, and soybean. Economic crops are mainly sugarcane, cassava, and tobacco.

The region also has an abundance of iron, lead, zinc, phosphorite, silicon dioxide, and calcite.

== Demographics ==
Historical population
Year	Pop.	±%
2011	22,190	—
2019	23,581	+6.3%

In 2019, Huaiqun had a total population of 23,581.
