= Guizhou–Guangxi railway =

Railway line in China

Guizhou–Guangxi railway 黔桂铁路
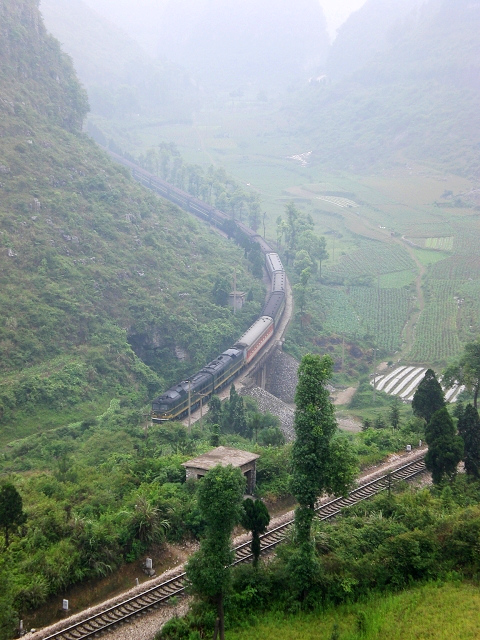
- The Guizhou–Guangxi railway near the Layi station in Nandan County, Hechi, Guangxi

Overview
- Status: Open
- Locale: Guangxi, Guizhou
- Termini: Guiyang; Liuzhou

Service
- Operator(s): China Railway

Technical
- Line length: 489 km (304 mi)
- Character: Heavy rail
- Track gauge: 1,435 mm (4 ft 8 1/2 in)
- Minimum radius: 1,600 m (5,200 ft)
- Operating speed: 160 km/h (99 mph) max.

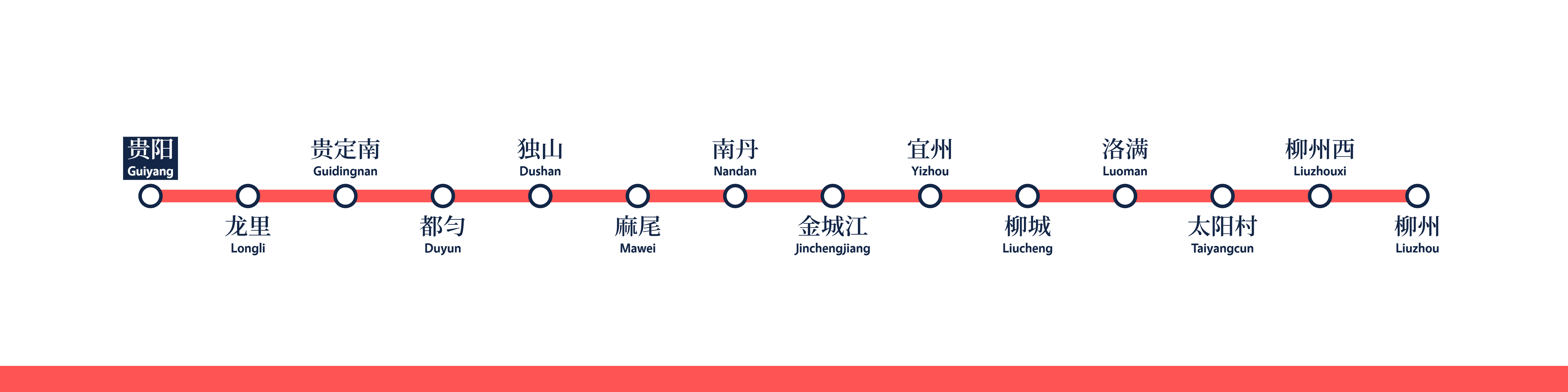
Guizhou–Guangxi railway route map

The Guizhou–Guangxi railway or Qian'gui railway (simplified Chinese: 黔桂铁路; traditional Chinese: 黔桂鐵路; pinyin: qián'guì tiělù), also written as the Kweichow–Kwangsi railway is a single-track electrified railroad in Southwest China between Guiyang in Guizhou Province and Liuzhou in Guangxi Zhuang Autonomous Region. The shorthand name for the line, Qiangui, is derived from the shorthand names of Guizhou (Qian 黔) and Guangxi (Gui 桂).

The railway was originally built from 1939 to 1958 and had a total length of 607 km (377 mi). From 2004 to 2009, the line was rebuilt to add tunnels and bridges in place of switchbacks over mountainous terrain and reduced in length to 489 km (304 mi). Travel time between the two terminal cities has been reduced from 14 hours to 5 hours.

Major cities and towns along route include Liuzhou, Liujiang, Liucheng, Yizhou, Hechi, Dushan County, Duyun, Guiding County, Longli County, and Guiyang. The Qiangui railway is a major rail conduit in western China from Baotou in Inner Mongolia to Gulf of Tonkin.

== History ==
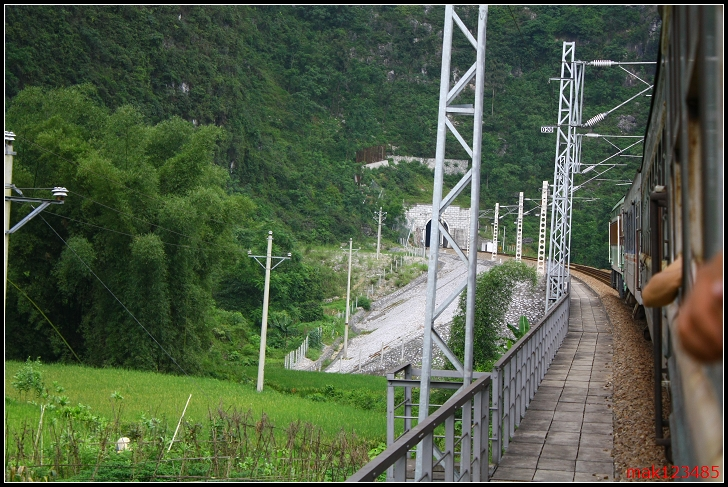
On the electrified and rebuilt section of the Qiangui Line between Yizhou and Hechi

Construction of the Guizhou–Guangxi railway began under the Nationalist government of China during World War II to provide the country's wartime capital, Chongqing, with an outlet to the sea. In April 1939, with the Japanese invasion threatening Jiangxi and Hunan Provinces, the Chinese government chose to abandon construction of the Hunan–Guizhou railway and shifted personnel southwestward to the Guizhou–Guangxi corridor. From September 1939 to February 1941, 161 km (100 mi) of track was laid in the plains from Liuzhou to Jinchengjiang (Hechi). The 237 km (147 mi) Jinchengjiang to Dushan section was completed by May 1943, and gave rail access to the airfield at Dushan. Dushan served as a base for the Flying Tigers and reception point for the allied air shipments over "the hump" from India. The Qiangui railway was used to redistribute supplies to southern Guizhou and Guangxi. Pilots shot down and rescued in rural Guangxi and Guizhou were sent to stations along route and transported by rail back to Dushan.

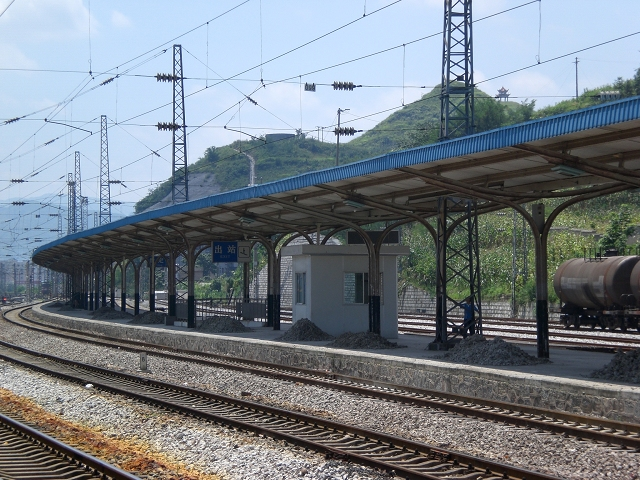
The Guiding railway station in Guiding County, Guizhou

Over 200,000 workers were mobilized for the project in Guangxi and 30,000 in Guizhou. Over 2,000 workers died of disease and accidents. Work on the final section from Duyun to Guizhou was halted in 1944 with the Japanese Ichi-Go Offensive. In November 1944, the Japanese captured Liuzhou and proceeded to travel up the railway to attack southern Guizhou. The Chinese forces defending Mawei, Dushan and Duyun proceeded to destroy the railway and train cars. After the Japanese surrender in 1945, the Republican government began to repair the sections damaged by the war. The Chinese Civil War intervened and by 1949 only the Liuzhou-Jinchengjiang section had been restored.

After the founding of the People's Republic of China in 1949, the new government removed rails from 300-km unrepaired section from Jinchengjiang to Qingtaipo to build the Hunan–Guangxi railway. Construction on the Jinchengjiang to Duyun section of the Guizhou–Guangxi railway resumed in 1955 and was completed in 1958. The entire line officially opened on January 7, 1959. Aside from the Guiyang to Guiding section which had double-track, the rest of the line was single track.

Due to the mountain terrain and steep inclines on the line, average travel speed on the line was limited to 41 km/h (25 mph) for passenger service and 21 km/h (13 mph) for freight. From December 2004 to January 2009, the railway underwent reconstruction to expand capacity. The Luoman (Liujiang) to Jinchengjiang section of the line was largely rebuilt. Entirely new lines were built between Jinchenjiang to Longli and between Liuzhou and Luoman. The Liuzhou to Longli section was electrified. As a result, the length of the line was shortened by 118 km (73 mi). Travel speed rose to 160 km/h (99 mph) between Liuzhou and Jinchengjiang and between and 140 km/h (87 mph) between Jinchengjiang and Longli.

== Rail connections ==
- Liuzhou: Hunan–Guangxi railway
- Guiyang / Guiding: Shanghai–Kunming railway

== See also ==
- List of railways in China
