= Xiangyang, Tian'e County =

Xiangyang 向阳镇
- Town
- Location in Guangxi
- Coordinates: 25°2′38″N 106°57′16″E
- Country: People's Republic of China
- Autonomous region: Guangxi
- Prefecture-level city: Hechi
- County: Tian'e County
- Time zone: UTC+8 (China Standard)

Xiangyang (Chinese: 向阳) is a town of Tian'e County, Guangxi, China. As of 2018, it has 15 villages under its administration.
