= Varihnaz =

Chinese folk rock band

- Origin: Nandan, Guangxi, China
- Genres: folk, folk rock
- Years active: 2006-2012, 2022-present
- Label: Demodance
- Members: Banong; Lumin; Shiba
- Past members: Suoli

Varihnaz（/vɑːˈi.nə/ vah-EE-nə; Zhuang: Varihnaz, Vareihnaz, pronounced [waː˨ɣiː˧naː˧˩]; Chinese: 瓦依那) is a Chinese folk rock band. Since 2022, the band has consisted of Banong (voice), Lumin (percussions, drums), and Shiba (guitar).

All members of Varihnaz are Zhuang from rural areas of Guangxi. They sing in Zhuang languages, Gui-Liu Mandarin, and Standard Mandarin. They are best known for appearing on season 3 of the iQiYi music reality competition show The Big Band.

== Overview ==
Varihnaz was formed in 2006, when two Zhuang farmers, Banong and Suoli, moved from their hometown in Nandan, Guangxi, to Guangzhou in search of opportunities. The name Varihnaz means "fields filled with fragrant rice flowers" in Zhuang. The band received little attention, with the duo treating it as a side hobby and playing at small local venues.

Banong found work as a graphic designer in Guangzhou and learned to play the guitar. However, he grew increasingly dissatisfied with his office job, and eventually moved back to Nandan in 2012 to focus on organic rice farming and producing three albums. He also learned to play traditional Zhuang instruments, and collected local nursery rhymes. The band then went on a hiatus.

In 2019, Banong met Shiba, also a farmer, and Lumin, a bricklayer. The three reformed Varihnaz in Guangzhou in 2022, but their concerts were met with poor attandances.

The band received sudden popularity when they competed on season 3 of the iQiYi music reality competition show The Big Band in 2023. Their song Big Dream (大梦), featuring Ren Suxi, received the most popular votes of the entire competition.

== Members ==
Banong in 2025

- Banong (voice)
- Lumin (percussions, drums)
- Shiba (guitar)
