= Wuxu, Hechi =

Wuxu 五圩镇
- Town
- Location within Guangxi Location within China
- Coordinates: 24°33′37″N 107°53′35″E
- Country: China
- Autonomous region: Guangxi
- Prefecture-level city: Hechi
- District: Jinchengjiang District

Area
  - Total: 154 km^{2} (59 sq mi)

Population
  - Estimate (2013): 14,000
- Postal code: 547000
- Area code: 0778

Wuxu (Chinese: 五圩; pinyin: Wǔxū) is an urban town in Jinchengjiang District, Hechi, Guangxi, China. The Jinchengjiang Industrial Cluster (金城江工业集中区), established in 2009, is situated in Wuxu. As of 2020 Wuxu has the jurisdictions over Wuxu Residential Community and the following nine villages:

- Sanjing Village (三境村)
- Longma Village (龙马村)
- Nagan Village (那干村)
- Pingqiao Village (平桥村)
- Tangjiang Village (塘降村)
- Chaojiao Village (朝觉村)
- Tangzhou Village (塘州村)
- Banluan Village (板鸾村)
- Bawang Village (拔旺村)
