= Hechi Jinchengjiang Airport =

Airport in Jinchengjiang District, People's Republic of China

Hechi Jinchengjiang Airport 河池金城江机场
- IATA: HCJ; ICAO: ZGHC

Summary
- Airport type: Public
- Serves: Hechi, Guangxi
- Location: Jinchengjiang District, Hechi
- Opened: 28 August 2014
- Elevation AMSL: 677 m (2,221 ft)
- Coordinates: 24°47′02″N 107°41′59″E

Map
- Location of airport in Guangxi

Runways
Direction	Length		Surface
Direction	m	ft	Surface
14/32	2,200	7,218	Concrete

Statistics (2021)
- Passengers: 12,889
- Aircraft movements: 438

Hechi Jinchengjiang Airport
- Simplified Chinese: 河池金城江机场
- Traditional Chinese: 河池金城江機場
Transcriptions
Standard Mandarin
- Hanyu Pinyin: Héchí Jīnchéngjiāng Jīchǎng
Yue: Cantonese
- Jyutping: Ho2chi2 Gei1coeng4

Hechi Jinchengjiang Airport (IATA: HCJ, ICAO: ZGHC) is an airport serving in the city of Hechi in Guangxi Zhuang Autonomous Region, China. It is built on the Jiantang Mountain, in Hechi Town, Jinchengjiang District, 40 kilometres (25 mi) from the city center. With at an elevation of 677 metres (2,221 ft), it is the highest airport in Guangxi.

Construction began on 3 December 2008 with a total investment of 850 million yuan, and the airport was opened on 28 August 2014. Owing to the lack of flat land in the mountainous region, more than 60 hilltops were leveled to create the runway.

== Facilities ==
The airport has one runway that is 2,200 meters long and 45 meters wide, and a 4,200-square-meter terminal building. It can handle three flights per hour.

== Airlines and destinations ==
Airlines	Destinations
Chongqing Airlines	Shenzhen
Tianjin Airlines	Haikou, Huizhou

== See also ==
- List of airports in China
- List of the busiest airports in China
