= Nandan County =

Nandan County 南丹县 · Nanzdanh Yen Nantan
- County
- Location of the seat in Guangxi
- Coordinates: 24°58′26″N 107°32′28″E
- Country: China
- Autonomous region: Guangxi
- Prefecture-level city: Hechi
- Township-level divisions: 8 towns 1 ethnic township
- County seat: Chengguan (城关镇)

Area
  - Total: 3,902 km^{2} (1,507 sq mi)
- Elevation: 680 m (2,230 ft)

Population (2020)
  - Total: 275,554
  - Density: 70.62/km^{2} (182.9/sq mi)
- Time zone: UTC+8 (China Standard)
- Postal code: 547200
- Area code: 0778

Nandan (Chinese: 南丹; pinyin: Nándān, Zhuang: Nanzdanh) is a county of Hechi City, in the northwest of Guangxi, China. It has an area of 3,902 km^{2} (1,507 sq mi) and a population of 291,421 (2010).

== Administrative divisions ==
There are 8 towns and 1 ethnic township in the county.

Towns

Chengguan (城关镇), Dachang (大厂镇), Chehe (车河镇), Mangchang (芒场镇), Liuzhai (Liuchai) (六寨镇), Yueli (月里镇), Wu'ai (吾隘镇), Luofu (罗富镇)

Ethnic townships

Zhongbao Miao Ethnic Township (中堡苗族乡), Bawei Yao Ethnic Township (八圩瑶族乡), Lihu Yao Ethnic Township (里湖瑶族乡)

== Demographics ==
In 2010 Nandan's population was 291,421.

72.73% (202,447) of the people belong to the national minority. Ethnic groups include Zhuang, Han, Yao, Mulao, Maonan, Miao, and Shui. In these ethnic groups, Zhuang population was 101,165 (34.71%), Han was 75,903 (27.27%).

== Climate ==
Climate data for Nandan, elevation 750 m (2,460 ft), (1991–2020 normals)
Month	Jan	Feb	Mar	Apr	May	Jun	Jul	Aug	Sep	Oct	Nov	Dec	Year
Mean daily maximum °C (°F)	11.2 (52.2)	14.0 (57.2)	17.5 (63.5)	22.9 (73.2)	26.2 (79.2)	28.0 (82.4)	29.4 (84.9)	29.9 (85.8)	27.7 (81.9)	23.5 (74.3)	19.2 (66.6)	14.1 (57.4)	22.0 (71.6)
Daily mean °C (°F)	7.6 (45.7)	10.0 (50.0)	13.4 (56.1)	18.4 (65.1)	21.8 (71.2)	24.0 (75.2)	25.0 (77.0)	24.8 (76.6)	22.7 (72.9)	18.7 (65.7)	14.3 (57.7)	9.5 (49.1)	17.5 (63.5)
Mean daily minimum °C (°F)	5.2 (41.4)	7.4 (45.3)	10.7 (51.3)	15.4 (59.7)	18.8 (65.8)	21.4 (70.5)	22.2 (72.0)	21.7 (71.1)	19.4 (66.9)	15.7 (60.3)	11.1 (52.0)	6.6 (43.9)	14.6 (58.4)
Average precipitation mm (inches)	36.8 (1.45)	33.9 (1.33)	66.7 (2.63)	99.3 (3.91)	208.2 (8.20)	322.8 (12.71)	264.5 (10.41)	197.1 (7.76)	127.9 (5.04)	81.8 (3.22)	40.9 (1.61)	29.0 (1.14)	1,508.9 (59.41)
Average precipitation days (≥ 0.1 mm)	14.3	13.1	17.8	16.2	17.0	18.9	19.5	16.1	11.2	10.6	10.2	9.8	174.7
Average snowy days	1.2	0.4	0	0	0	0	0	0	0	0	0	0.3	1.9
Average relative humidity (%)	81	80	82	81	82	85	85	83	80	79	79	77	81
Mean monthly sunshine hours	47.3	54.7	67.7	94.8	115.4	95.0	148.3	171.8	148.7	116.5	107.5	89.5	1,257.2
Percentage possible sunshine	14	17	18	25	28	23	36	43	41	33	33	27	28
Source: China Meteorological Administration

== Transportation ==
- Qiangui Railway
- China National Highway 210

== Notable people ==
- Varihnaz, Zhuang folk rock band
