= Qingyuan, Guangxi =

Qingyuan 庆远镇
- Town
- Location within China
- Coordinates: 24°29′39″N 108°39′39″E
- Country: China
- Autonomous region: Guangxi
- Prefecture-level city: Hechi
- County-level city: Yizhou

Area
  - Total: 40 km^{2} (15 sq mi)
- Elevation: 141 m (463 ft)

Population (2002)
  - Total: 30,321
  - Density: 760/km^{2} (2,000/sq mi)
- Time zone: UTC+8 (China Standard)
- Postal code: 451281100
- Area code: 0778

Qingyuan (simplified Chinese: 庆远; traditional Chinese: 慶遠; pinyin: Qìngyuǎn) is a town in northern Guangxi, Southern China. It is the seat of the county-level city of Yizhou, with an area of 40 square kilometres (15 sq mi) and a population of 30,321.
