= Rongshui Miao Autonomous County =

Rongshui County 融水苗族自治县 · Yungzsuij Yen Junghshui
- County
- Rongshui Miao Autonomous County 融水苗族自治县; Yungzsuij Myauzcuz Swciyen
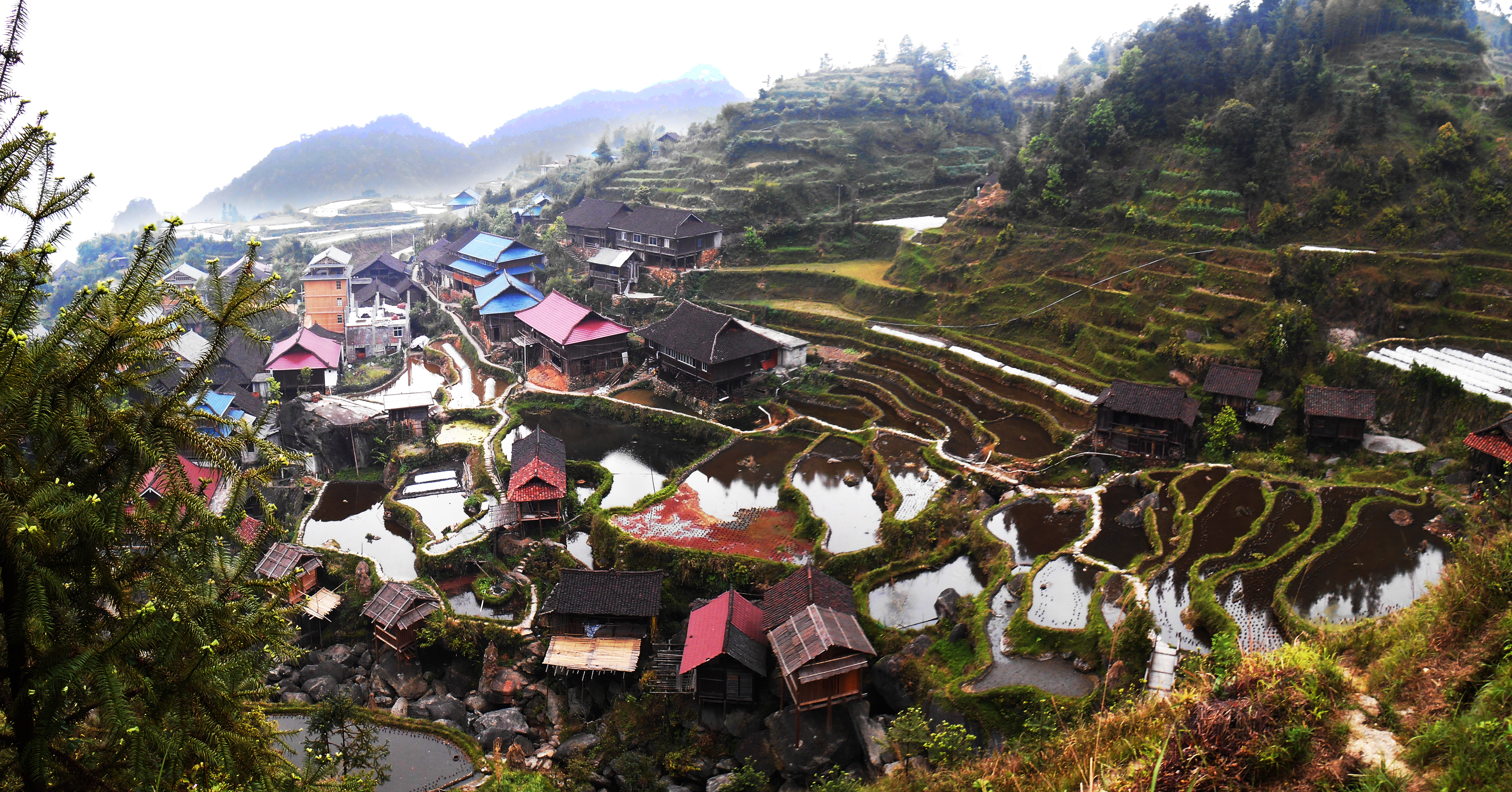

- Location in Guangxi
- Coordinates: 25°04′01″N 109°15′18″E
- Country: China
- Autonomous region: Guangxi
- Prefecture-level city: Liuzhou
- County seat: Rongshui Town

Area
  - Total: 4,665 km^{2} (1,801 sq mi)
- Elevation: 115 m (377 ft)

Population (2010)
  - Total: 402,054
  - Density: 86.19/km^{2} (223.2/sq mi)
- Time zone: UTC+8 (China Standard)
- Postal code: 5453XX
- Website: rongshui.gov.cn

Rongshui Miao Autonomous County (simplified Chinese: 融水苗族自治县; traditional Chinese: 融水苗族自治縣; pinyin: Róngshuǐ Miáozú Zìzhìxiàn; Standard Zhuang: Yungzsuij Myauzcuz Swciyen; Hmu: Ghab Yinb) is under the administration of Liuzhou, Guangxi Zhuang Autonomous Region, China. The seat of Rongshui County is Rongshui Town. It borders the prefecture-level divisions of Qiandongnan (Guizhou) to the north and Hechi to the west.

Rongshui Miao Autonomous County is the only Miao majority county in Guangxi, with 40 percent of the total population representing the Miao nation.

== Demographics ==
Rongshui County has a total population of 485,120 (2007).

More than 70 percent of the population represents various ethnic minorities, such as the Miao, Yao, Dong, Zhuang and others. 40,81% of the total population belong to the Miao minority (2007).

== Geography ==
Rongshui County is located in northwestern Guangxi. It borders Rong'an County to the east, Sanjiang Dong Autonomous County to the northeast, Liucheng County to the south, Huanjiang County to the west, Luocheng County to the southwest, and Congjiang County, Guizhou to the north.

Apart from the county town, Rongshui comprises many small villages and large rural areas. The county is mountainous, featuring both karst landscapes and larger mountain massifs such as the Yuan Bao Shan mountains. The river Rong (Rongjiang) flows through the county and passes by Rongshui town. The longest river within the county is the Bei River (Beijiang, not to be confused with the Beijiang tributary to the Zhujiang).

== Administrative divisions ==
Rongshui County is divided into 7 towns, 11 townships and 2 ethnic townships:

towns

- Rongshui Town 融水镇
- Hemu Town 和睦镇
- Sanfang Town 三防镇
- Huaibao Town 怀宝镇
- Dongtou Town 洞头镇
- Dalang Town 大浪镇
- Yongle Town 永乐镇

townships

- Sirong Township 四荣乡
- Xiangfen Township 香粉乡
- Antai Township 安太乡
- Wangdong Township 汪洞乡
- Gandong Township 杆洞乡
- Anchui Township 安陲乡
- Baiyun Township 白云乡
- Hongshui Township 红水乡
- Gongdong Township 拱洞乡
- Liangzhai Township 良寨乡
- Danian大年乡

Ethnic townships

- Tonglian Dong Ethnic Township 同练瑶族乡
- Gunbei Dong Ethnic Township 滚贝侗族乡

== Transport ==
Highway G209 provides access to Rongshui from Liuzhou in the south and Guyizheng in the north (with highway G321 connecting from Guyizheng to Guiyang, the capital of Guizhou province, in the west).

Rongshui is serviced by trains connecting with Liuzhou in the south and Huaihua (Hunan) in the north, branching off to larger cities such as Guiyang (Guizhou), Changsha (Hunan), Wuhan (Hubei) and Zhengzhou (Henan).

== Culture ==
Rongshui is known for the frequent festivals of its Miao population.

Their celebrations include the drum festival, sowing festival, seedling festival and horse-fighting festivals. The festivities are often accompanied by music played on the Lusheng, a reed-pipe wind instrument, and dancing and singing performances.

== Climate ==
Climate data for Rongshui, elevation 123 m (404 ft), (1991–2017 normals, extremes 1981–2010)
Month	Jan	Feb	Mar	Apr	May	Jun	Jul	Aug	Sep	Oct	Nov	Dec	Year
Record high °C (°F)	26.8 (80.2)	31.2 (88.2)	33.5 (92.3)	34.8 (94.6)	35.4 (95.7)	37.4 (99.3)	38.6 (101.5)	39.0 (102.2)	38.7 (101.7)	36.2 (97.2)	32.3 (90.1)	29.4 (84.9)	39.0 (102.2)
Mean daily maximum °C (°F)	12.7 (54.9)	15.4 (59.7)	18.4 (65.1)	24.5 (76.1)	28.5 (83.3)	30.8 (87.4)	32.8 (91.0)	33.3 (91.9)	31.4 (88.5)	27.0 (80.6)	21.6 (70.9)	16.1 (61.0)	24.4 (75.9)
Daily mean °C (°F)	9.2 (48.6)	11.5 (52.7)	14.6 (58.3)	20.2 (68.4)	24.0 (75.2)	26.7 (80.1)	28.2 (82.8)	28.3 (82.9)	26.1 (79.0)	21.8 (71.2)	16.6 (61.9)	11.6 (52.9)	19.9 (67.8)
Mean daily minimum °C (°F)	6.9 (44.4)	9.0 (48.2)	12.1 (53.8)	17.3 (63.1)	20.9 (69.6)	23.9 (75.0)	25.1 (77.2)	24.9 (76.8)	22.6 (72.7)	18.4 (65.1)	13.4 (56.1)	8.7 (47.7)	16.9 (62.5)
Record low °C (°F)	−2.0 (28.4)	−1.2 (29.8)	−0.2 (31.6)	4.7 (40.5)	10.7 (51.3)	14.5 (58.1)	17.6 (63.7)	20.1 (68.2)	12.8 (55.0)	5.8 (42.4)	1.5 (34.7)	−3.3 (26.1)	−3.3 (26.1)
Average precipitation mm (inches)	58.0 (2.28)	61.3 (2.41)	100.4 (3.95)	157.2 (6.19)	298.5 (11.75)	420.1 (16.54)	286.9 (11.30)	166.0 (6.54)	69.2 (2.72)	66.4 (2.61)	74.7 (2.94)	46.4 (1.83)	1,805.1 (71.06)
Average precipitation days (≥ 0.1 mm)	13.0	12.8	18.0	17.5	18.4	19.0	17.3	13.2	8.6	7.4	9.7	9.1	164
Average snowy days	0.5	0.3	0	0	0	0	0	0	0	0	0	0.2	1
Average relative humidity (%)	75	77	81	81	81	83	80	78	74	71	73	71	77
Mean monthly sunshine hours	53.4	50.3	49.6	75.9	105.8	106.1	167.9	191.9	180.4	153.6	117.1	98.8	1,350.8
Percentage possible sunshine	16	16	13	20	26	26	40	48	49	43	36	30	30
Source: China Meteorological Administration

== See also ==
- Rong River
- Sanjiang Dong Autonomous County
