= Liucheng, Xinjiang =

Settlement in Xinjiang, China

Liucheng (Chinese: 柳城; lit. 'Willow City'), also recorded as Lukchak, is a settlement in the Xinjiang Uyghur Autonomous Region in north-west China. It is located approximately 60 li south-east of Turfan.

It is recorded in Book of the Later Han, chapter 118, in the "Introduction to the section on Western countries", that from the year AD 123, the Chinese military governor Si yü resided in Liucheng.

Liucheng belonged to Gaochang in the Tang dynasty, and Wang Yande, sent as an envoy to Gaochang, passed through in AD 981.
