= Tian'e County =

Tian'e County 天峨县 · Denhngoz Yen
- County
- Location of the seat in Guangxi
- Coordinates: 24°59′56″N 107°10′26″E
- Country: China
- Autonomous region: Guangxi
- Prefecture-level city: Hechi
- Township-level divisions: 2 towns 6 townships 1 ethnic township
- County seat: Liupai (六排镇)

Area
  - Total: 3,696 km^{2} (1,427 sq mi)
- Elevation: 259 m (850 ft)

Population (2020)
  - Total: 143,155
  - Density: 38.73/km^{2} (100.3/sq mi)
- Time zone: UTC+8 (China Standard)
- Website: www.gxhcte.gov.cn

Tian'e (Chinese: 天峨; pinyin: Tiān'é; Zhuang: Denhngoz Yen) is a county of northwestern Guangxi, China, located on the upper reaches of the Hongshui River and bordering Guizhou province to the northwest. It is under the administration of the prefecture-level city of Hechi.

== Administrative divisions ==
There are 2 towns, 6 townships and 1 ethnic township in the county:

Towns

Liupai (六排镇), Xiangyang (向阳镇)

Townships

Bamu Township (岜暮乡), Nazhi Township (纳直乡), Gengxin Township (更新乡), Xialao Township (下老乡), Pojie Township (坡结乡), Sanbao Township (三堡乡)

Ethnic township

Bala Yao Ethnic Township (八腊瑶族乡)

== Transport and infrastructure ==
- Longtan Dam on the Hongshui River.

== Biodiversity ==
Sinocyclocheilus furcodorsalis is a species of cave fish that is only known from an underground stream in Tian'e County.

== Climate ==
Climate data for Tian'e, elevation 287 m (942 ft), (1991–2020 normals, extremes 1981–2010)
Month	Jan	Feb	Mar	Apr	May	Jun	Jul	Aug	Sep	Oct	Nov	Dec	Year
Record high °C (°F)	29.6 (85.3)	34.6 (94.3)	37.4 (99.3)	38.1 (100.6)	38.6 (101.5)	38.2 (100.8)	38.6 (101.5)	38.6 (101.5)	38.7 (101.7)	35.6 (96.1)	32.8 (91.0)	30.5 (86.9)	38.7 (101.7)
Mean daily maximum °C (°F)	15.5 (59.9)	18.3 (64.9)	21.9 (71.4)	27.0 (80.6)	29.9 (85.8)	31.3 (88.3)	32.7 (90.9)	33.1 (91.6)	31.2 (88.2)	26.9 (80.4)	22.9 (73.2)	17.8 (64.0)	25.7 (78.3)
Daily mean °C (°F)	11.5 (52.7)	13.8 (56.8)	17.1 (62.8)	21.7 (71.1)	24.6 (76.3)	26.4 (79.5)	27.3 (81.1)	27.1 (80.8)	25.2 (77.4)	21.5 (70.7)	17.5 (63.5)	13.0 (55.4)	20.6 (69.0)
Mean daily minimum °C (°F)	9.1 (48.4)	11.0 (51.8)	14.1 (57.4)	18.3 (64.9)	21.2 (70.2)	23.6 (74.5)	24.3 (75.7)	23.9 (75.0)	21.9 (71.4)	18.5 (65.3)	14.5 (58.1)	10.3 (50.5)	17.6 (63.6)
Record low °C (°F)	0.6 (33.1)	2.1 (35.8)	3.0 (37.4)	8.3 (46.9)	11.8 (53.2)	16.8 (62.2)	19.0 (66.2)	19.8 (67.6)	15.1 (59.2)	9.6 (49.3)	4.8 (40.6)	0.7 (33.3)	0.6 (33.1)
Average precipitation mm (inches)	24.7 (0.97)	25.6 (1.01)	53.7 (2.11)	80.8 (3.18)	209.8 (8.26)	284.3 (11.19)	259.6 (10.22)	175.7 (6.92)	118.3 (4.66)	77.6 (3.06)	34.6 (1.36)	20.8 (0.82)	1,365.5 (53.76)
Average precipitation days (≥ 0.1 mm)	9.8	9.2	13.3	14.1	16.3	18.2	18.6	16.0	10.8	9.5	7.7	7.1	150.6
Average snowy days	0.6	0.1	0	0	0	0	0	0	0	0	0	0.2	0.9
Average relative humidity (%)	75	74	75	76	79	83	83	82	80	79	77	74	78
Mean monthly sunshine hours	45.9	57.0	71.5	98.1	111.9	97.1	137.4	157.0	130.9	100.2	92.3	72.0	1,171.3
Percentage possible sunshine	14	18	19	26	27	24	33	39	36	28	28	22	26
Source: China Meteorological Administration
