= Luocheng Mulao Autonomous County =

Luocheng County 罗城县 · Lozcwngz Swciyen
- County
- 罗城仫佬族自治县; Lozcwngz Mulaujcuz Swciyen; Luocheng Mulao Autonomous County
- Location of the seat in Guangxi
- Coordinates: 24°47′N 108°54′E
- Country: China
- Region: Guangxi
- Prefecture-level city: Hechi
- Township-level divisions: 7 towns 4 townships
- County seat: Dongmen (东门镇)

Area
  - Total: 2,658 km^{2} (1,026 sq mi)
- Elevation: 339 m (1,112 ft)

Population (2020)
  - Total: 272,672
  - Density: 102.6/km^{2} (265.7/sq mi)
- Time zone: UTC+8 (China Standard)

Luocheng Mulao Autonomous County (Zhuang: Lozcwngz Bouxmohlaujcuz Swci Yen, simplified Chinese: 罗城仫佬族自治县; traditional Chinese: 羅城仫佬族自治縣; pinyin: Luóchéng Mùlǎozú Zìzhìxiàn) is an ethnic Mulao county of northern Guangxi, China. It is under the administration of Hechi City. It is the only Mulao autonomous county in China.

== Administrative divisions ==
There are 7 towns and 4 townships in the county:

- Towns:
  - Dongmen (东门镇)
  - Long'an (龙岸镇)
  - Huangjin (黄金镇)
  - Xiaochang'an (小长安镇)
  - Siba (四把镇)
  - Tianhe (天河镇)
  - Huaiqun (怀群镇)
- Townships:
  - Baotan Township (宝坛乡)
  - Qiaoshan Township (乔善乡)
  - Naweng Township (纳翁乡)
  - Jian'ai Township (兼爱乡)

== Languages ==
The Mulao language (or Mulam) is spoken by the Mulao people of Luocheng County.

At least seven varieties of Chinese are spoken in Luocheng County (Edmondson 1992:137).

- Putonghua is the national language of China.
- Gui-Liu Hua is a local Pinghua variety spoken in Guilin and Liuzhou. It was spoken by government officials formerly sent to administer the region, and also used to be spoken in the provincial court.
- Tuguai Hua is the local Southwestern Mandarin vernacular spoken in Luocheng, Rongshui, and other nearby counties.
- Magai is a Cantonese variety introduced by migrating merchants from Guangdong.
- Ngai is a form of Southern Chinese with seven tones. It is spoken by 20,000 Han peasant agriculturalists.
- Yangsan is an archaic form of Chinese now spoken by only 300 people. It retains voiced stops and ten tones.
- Southern Min was introduced by recent migrants from Fujian.

== Climate ==
Climate data for Luocheng, elevation 363 m (1,191 ft), (1991–2020 normals)
Month	Jan	Feb	Mar	Apr	May	Jun	Jul	Aug	Sep	Oct	Nov	Dec	Year
Mean daily maximum °C (°F)	12.6 (54.7)	15.0 (59.0)	18.1 (64.6)	23.8 (74.8)	27.8 (82.0)	29.9 (85.8)	31.7 (89.1)	32.1 (89.8)	30.2 (86.4)	26.1 (79.0)	21.3 (70.3)	15.7 (60.3)	23.7 (74.6)
Daily mean °C (°F)	9.1 (48.4)	11.4 (52.5)	14.5 (58.1)	19.8 (67.6)	23.6 (74.5)	25.9 (78.6)	27.2 (81.0)	27.2 (81.0)	25.2 (77.4)	21.1 (70.0)	16.2 (61.2)	11.2 (52.2)	19.4 (66.9)
Mean daily minimum °C (°F)	6.6 (43.9)	8.8 (47.8)	12.0 (53.6)	16.9 (62.4)	20.5 (68.9)	23.2 (73.8)	24.1 (75.4)	23.8 (74.8)	21.5 (70.7)	17.5 (63.5)	12.8 (55.0)	8.1 (46.6)	16.3 (61.4)
Average precipitation mm (inches)	53.7 (2.11)	51.2 (2.02)	92.7 (3.65)	131.4 (5.17)	242.2 (9.54)	366.5 (14.43)	251.6 (9.91)	161.6 (6.36)	88.9 (3.50)	62.5 (2.46)	59.4 (2.34)	43.7 (1.72)	1,605.4 (63.21)
Average precipitation days (≥ 0.1 mm)	13.8	12.5	18.4	16.7	17.0	19.2	17.1	14.2	8.7	8.2	9.4	9.2	164.4
Average snowy days	0.6	0.1	0	0	0	0	0	0	0	0	0	0.2	0.9
Average relative humidity (%)	77	78	82	81	81	84	82	80	76	73	74	72	78
Mean monthly sunshine hours	48.0	43.6	46.6	66.9	96.4	93.3	151.8	174.3	162.8	136.7	112.1	94.9	1,227.4
Percentage possible sunshine	14	14	12	17	23	23	36	44	45	39	35	29	28
Source: China Meteorological Administration
