= Liucheng County =

Liucheng County 柳城县 · Liujcwngz Yen
- County
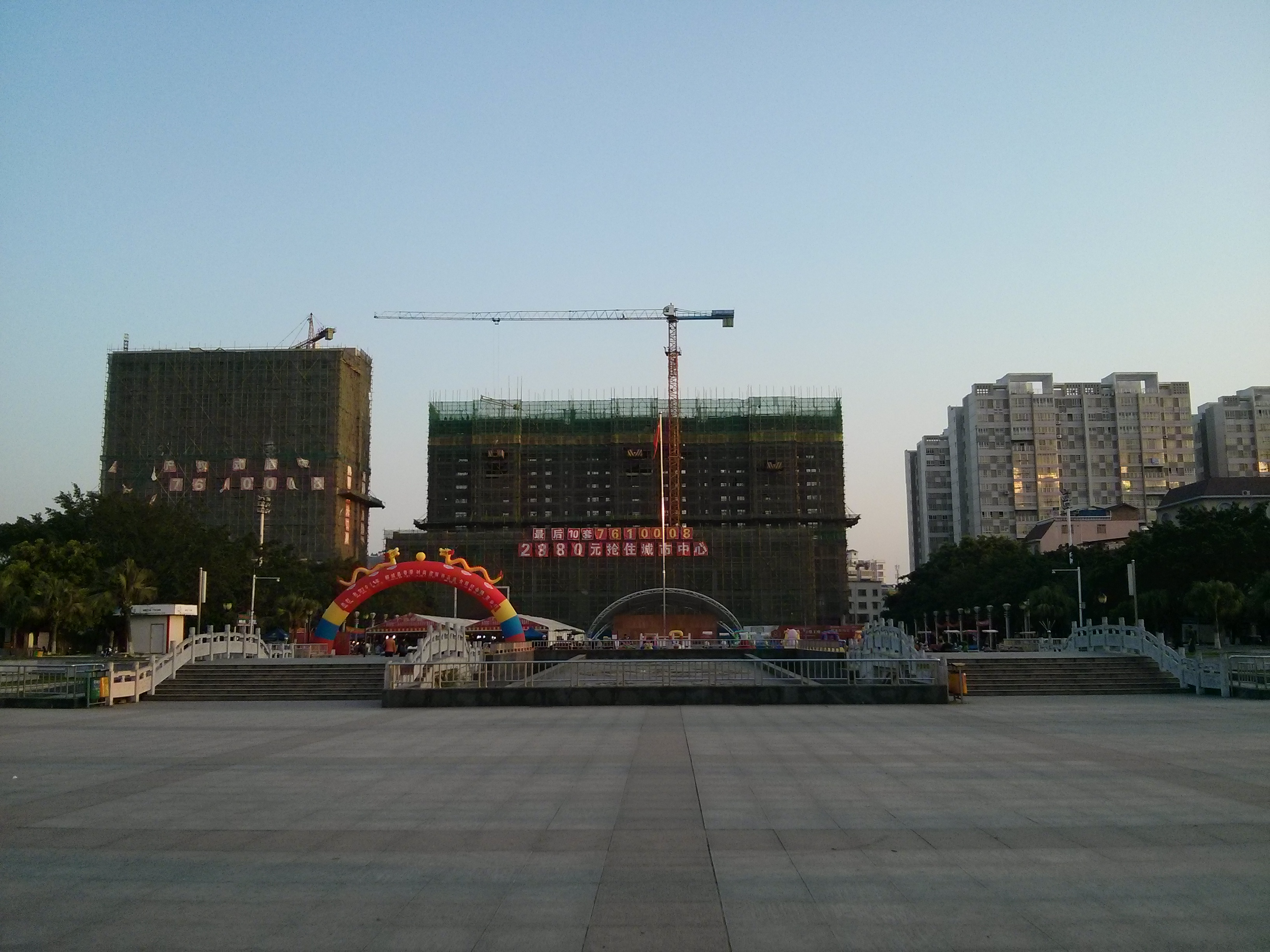

- Location in Guangxi
- Coordinates: 24°39′11″N 109°14′42″E
- Country: China
- Autonomous region: Guangxi
- Prefecture-level city: Liuzhou
- County seat: Dapu (大埔镇)

Area
  - Total: 2,109.78 km^{2} (814.59 sq mi)
- Elevation: 107 m (351 ft)

Population (2010)
  - Total: 353,796
  - Density: 167.693/km^{2} (434.324/sq mi)
- Time zone: UTC+8 (China Standard)
- Postal code: 5452XX

Liucheng County (simplified Chinese: 柳城县; traditional Chinese: 柳城縣; pinyin: Liǔchéng Xiàn; Standard Zhuang: Liujcwngz Yen) is under the administration of Liuzhou, Guangxi Zhuang Autonomous Region, China. It covers a land area of 2,109.78 square kilometres (814.59 sq mi) and had a permanent population of 353,796 as of 2010. Located north of Liuzhou's city proper, it borders the prefecture-level city of Hechi to the west.

== Administrative divisions ==
Liucheng consists of 10 towns, 1 township and 1 ethnic township:

Towns

- Dapu (大埔镇)
- Longtou (龙头镇)
- Taiping (太平镇)
- Shapu (沙埔镇)
- Dongquan (东泉镇)
- Fengshan (凤山镇)
- Liutang (六塘镇)
- Chongyao (冲脉镇)
- Zhailong (寨隆镇)
- Mashan (马山镇)

Township

- Shechong Township (社冲乡)

Ethnic township

- Guzhai Mulao Ethnic Township (古砦仫佬族乡)

== Climate ==
Climate data for Liucheng, elevation 108 m (354 ft), (1991–2020 normals, extremes 1981–present)
Month	Jan	Feb	Mar	Apr	May	Jun	Jul	Aug	Sep	Oct	Nov	Dec	Year
Record high °C (°F)	28.2 (82.8)	32.7 (90.9)	34.8 (94.6)	40.2 (104.4)	36.2 (97.2)	37.2 (99.0)	39.2 (102.6)	39.5 (103.1)	38.9 (102.0)	36.4 (97.5)	32.7 (90.9)	29.3 (84.7)	40.2 (104.4)
Mean daily maximum °C (°F)	13.7 (56.7)	16.3 (61.3)	19.1 (66.4)	25.2 (77.4)	29.3 (84.7)	31.5 (88.7)	33.3 (91.9)	33.6 (92.5)	31.8 (89.2)	27.8 (82.0)	22.5 (72.5)	17.0 (62.6)	25.1 (77.2)
Daily mean °C (°F)	9.9 (49.8)	12.4 (54.3)	15.3 (59.5)	21.0 (69.8)	24.7 (76.5)	27.1 (80.8)	28.5 (83.3)	28.5 (83.3)	26.6 (79.9)	22.4 (72.3)	17.2 (63.0)	12.0 (53.6)	20.5 (68.8)
Mean daily minimum °C (°F)	7.4 (45.3)	9.7 (49.5)	12.8 (55.0)	18.0 (64.4)	21.5 (70.7)	24.2 (75.6)	25.3 (77.5)	25.1 (77.2)	22.9 (73.2)	18.7 (65.7)	13.7 (56.7)	8.8 (47.8)	17.3 (63.2)
Record low °C (°F)	−1.3 (29.7)	−0.7 (30.7)	0.8 (33.4)	7.9 (46.2)	12.3 (54.1)	16.2 (61.2)	19.3 (66.7)	20.3 (68.5)	14.4 (57.9)	7.7 (45.9)	3.1 (37.6)	−1.9 (28.6)	−1.9 (28.6)
Average precipitation mm (inches)	50.7 (2.00)	42.1 (1.66)	90.2 (3.55)	126.2 (4.97)	234.8 (9.24)	287.0 (11.30)	187.2 (7.37)	144.4 (5.69)	67.2 (2.65)	52.5 (2.07)	57.2 (2.25)	48.0 (1.89)	1,387.5 (54.64)
Average precipitation days (≥ 0.1 mm)	11.1	11.7	16.7	15.5	16.0	17.2	15.7	12.7	8.1	6.1	7.7	8.1	146.6
Average snowy days	0.4	0	0	0	0	0	0	0	0	0	0	0.2	0.6
Average relative humidity (%)	74	75	79	79	79	82	79	78	74	71	73	71	76
Mean monthly sunshine hours	60.3	55.0	52.1	84.9	123.7	125.1	190.7	200.0	187.6	166.9	127.7	112.0	1,486
Percentage possible sunshine	18	17	14	22	30	31	46	50	51	47	39	34	33
Source: China Meteorological Administration
