= Yizhou District, Hechi =

Yizhou: 宜州区; Yizcouh Gih
- District
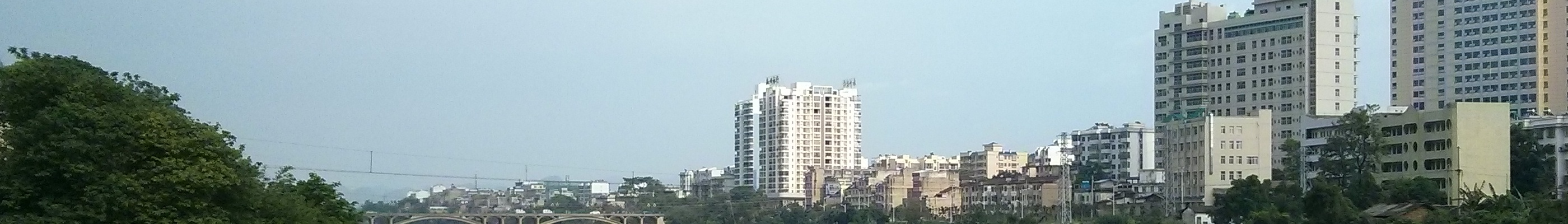
- Yizhou City
- Interactive map of Yizhou
- Coordinates: 24°28′N 108°35′E
- Country: China
- Region: Guangxi
- Prefecture-level city: Hechi
- Township-level divisions: 9 towns; 5 townships; 2 ethnic townships
- District seat: Qingyuan

Area
  - Total: 3,869 km^{2} (1,494 sq mi)
- Elevation: 153 m (502 ft)

Population (2004)
  - Total: 610,000
  - Density: 160/km^{2} (410/sq mi)
- Time zone: UTC+8 (China Standard)
- Postal code: 546300

Yizhou (Chinese: 宜州; pinyin: Yízhōu), formerly Yishan County (宜山县), is a district under the administration of Hechi City, Guangxi Zhuang Autonomous Region, China.

Yizhou is located in the northwest of Guangxi on the Long River in an area noted for its magnificent karst formations. The limestone karst formations dot the district and surrounding country and several rivers cut through the landscape. The district of Yizhou has several hundred thousand inhabitants. The surrounding countryside is home to a number of ethnic Zhuang villages. The economy is centered on sugar production, with a British-Chinese jointly run sugar processing plant nearby. The countryside surrounding Yizhou is similar in appearance to the tourist Mecca Yangshuo, located in the east of Guangxi. While Yizhou has a convenient tourist infrastructure, foreign tourists are sparse.

A notable person from Yizhou is the Song dynasty singer Liu Sanjie 刘三姐, renowned for her voice. The people of Yizhou believe that Liu was born there and a statue of her is in the district center.

In 2002 a riot struck the district. The Yizhou riots involved violence between the police and local farmers.

In Shanghai, the Yishan Road and Yishan light rail station are named after the district.

On 26 August 2008 an explosion at a chemical plant killed 20 people and injured many more. 11,000 were evacuated from their homes.

== Administrative divisions ==
Yizhou administers 9 towns, 5 townships, and 2 ethnic townships:

Towns

Qingyuan (庆远镇), Sancha (三岔镇), Luoxi (洛西镇), Huaiyuan (怀远镇), Desheng (德胜镇), Shibie (石别镇), Beishan (北山镇), Liusanjie (刘三姐镇), Luodong (洛东镇)

Townships

Xiangjian Township (祥贝乡), Pingnan Township (屏南乡), Tongde Township (同德乡), Anma Township (安马乡), Longtou Township (龙头乡)

Ethnic townships

Fulong Yao Ethnic Township (福龙瑶族乡), Beiya Yao Ethnic Township (北牙瑶族乡)

== Climate ==
Climate data for Yizhou, elevation 185 m (607 ft), (1991–2020 normals, extremes 1981–2010)
Month	Jan	Feb	Mar	Apr	May	Jun	Jul	Aug	Sep	Oct	Nov	Dec	Year
Record high °C (°F)	28.5 (83.3)	33.0 (91.4)	34.7 (94.5)	36.1 (97.0)	37.2 (99.0)	37.4 (99.3)	38.8 (101.8)	38.5 (101.3)	37.7 (99.9)	35.8 (96.4)	32.8 (91.0)	30.5 (86.9)	38.8 (101.8)
Mean daily maximum °C (°F)	13.9 (57.0)	16.4 (61.5)	19.5 (67.1)	25.3 (77.5)	29.4 (84.9)	31.5 (88.7)	33.2 (91.8)	33.3 (91.9)	31.5 (88.7)	27.4 (81.3)	22.6 (72.7)	17.0 (62.6)	25.1 (77.1)
Daily mean °C (°F)	10.2 (50.4)	12.6 (54.7)	15.7 (60.3)	21.1 (70.0)	24.9 (76.8)	27.2 (81.0)	28.4 (83.1)	28.2 (82.8)	26.3 (79.3)	22.2 (72.0)	17.4 (63.3)	12.3 (54.1)	20.5 (69.0)
Mean daily minimum °C (°F)	7.8 (46.0)	10.0 (50.0)	13.1 (55.6)	18.1 (64.6)	21.7 (71.1)	24.2 (75.6)	25.1 (77.2)	24.8 (76.6)	22.7 (72.9)	18.7 (65.7)	14.0 (57.2)	9.2 (48.6)	17.5 (63.4)
Record low °C (°F)	−0.4 (31.3)	−0.2 (31.6)	2.3 (36.1)	7.0 (44.6)	12.8 (55.0)	15.2 (59.4)	19.2 (66.6)	20.1 (68.2)	14.8 (58.6)	8.1 (46.6)	4.2 (39.6)	−0.5 (31.1)	−0.5 (31.1)
Average precipitation mm (inches)	55.5 (2.19)	40.9 (1.61)	79.9 (3.15)	96.4 (3.80)	205.9 (8.11)	317.1 (12.48)	227.0 (8.94)	161.2 (6.35)	93.7 (3.69)	65.9 (2.59)	52.4 (2.06)	44.6 (1.76)	1,440.5 (56.73)
Average precipitation days (≥ 0.1 mm)	13.3	11.8	16.6	15.2	15.4	17.0	16.2	14.1	8.6	7.5	8.4	8.8	152.9
Average snowy days	0.3	0	0	0	0	0	0	0	0	0	0	0.1	0.4
Average relative humidity (%)	78	78	82	81	80	83	80	80	77	75	76	74	79
Mean monthly sunshine hours	52.6	50.6	53.1	81.6	120.5	124.0	180.9	190.2	172.9	146.7	120.6	98.7	1,392.4
Percentage possible sunshine	16	16	14	21	29	30	44	48	47	41	37	30	31
Source: China Meteorological Administration

== Transportation ==
=== Rail ===
- Guizhou–Guangxi Railway

== See also ==
- Huang Tingjian
