= Hechi =

Hechi 河池市 • Hozciz Si
- Prefecture-level city
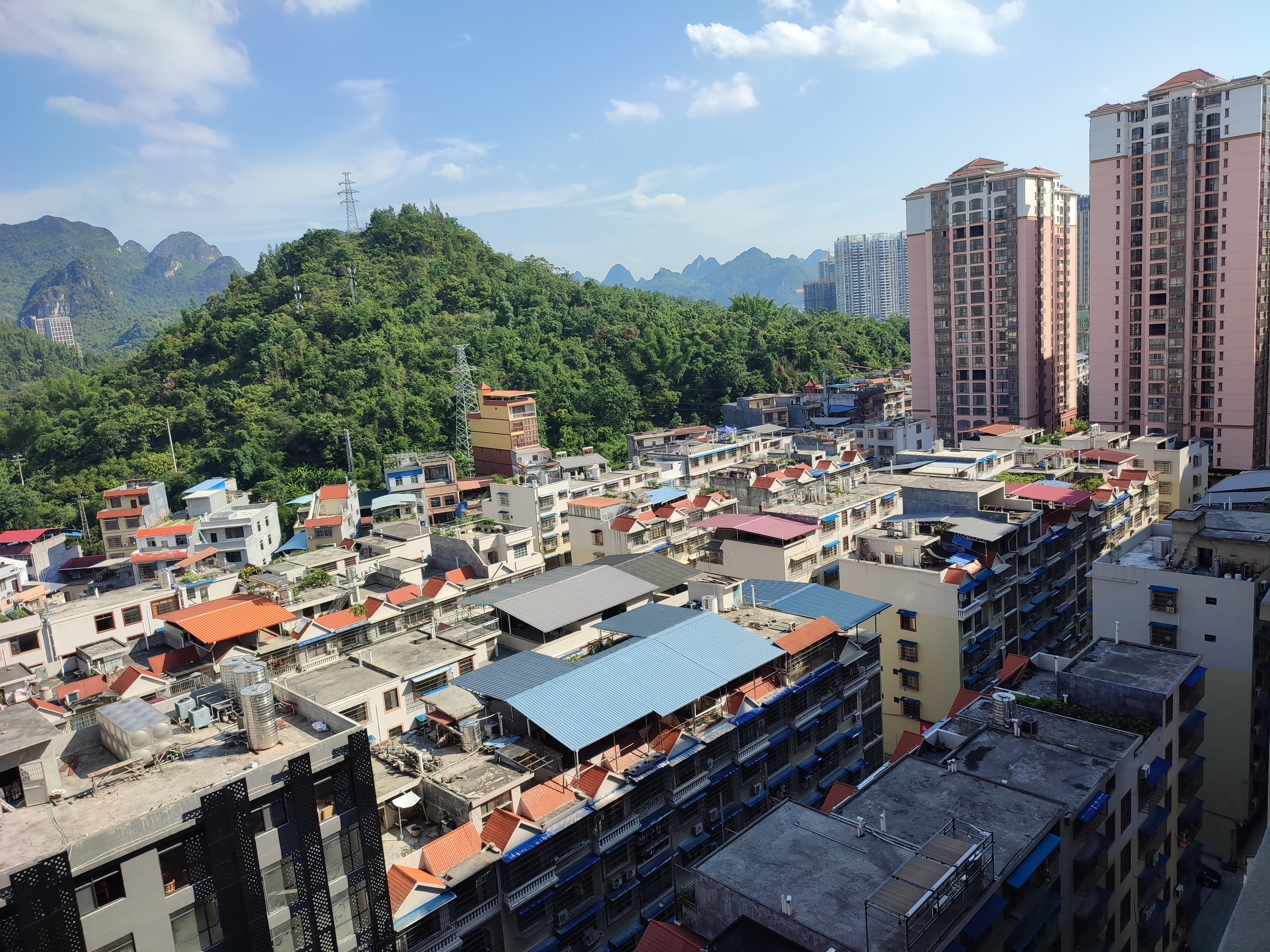
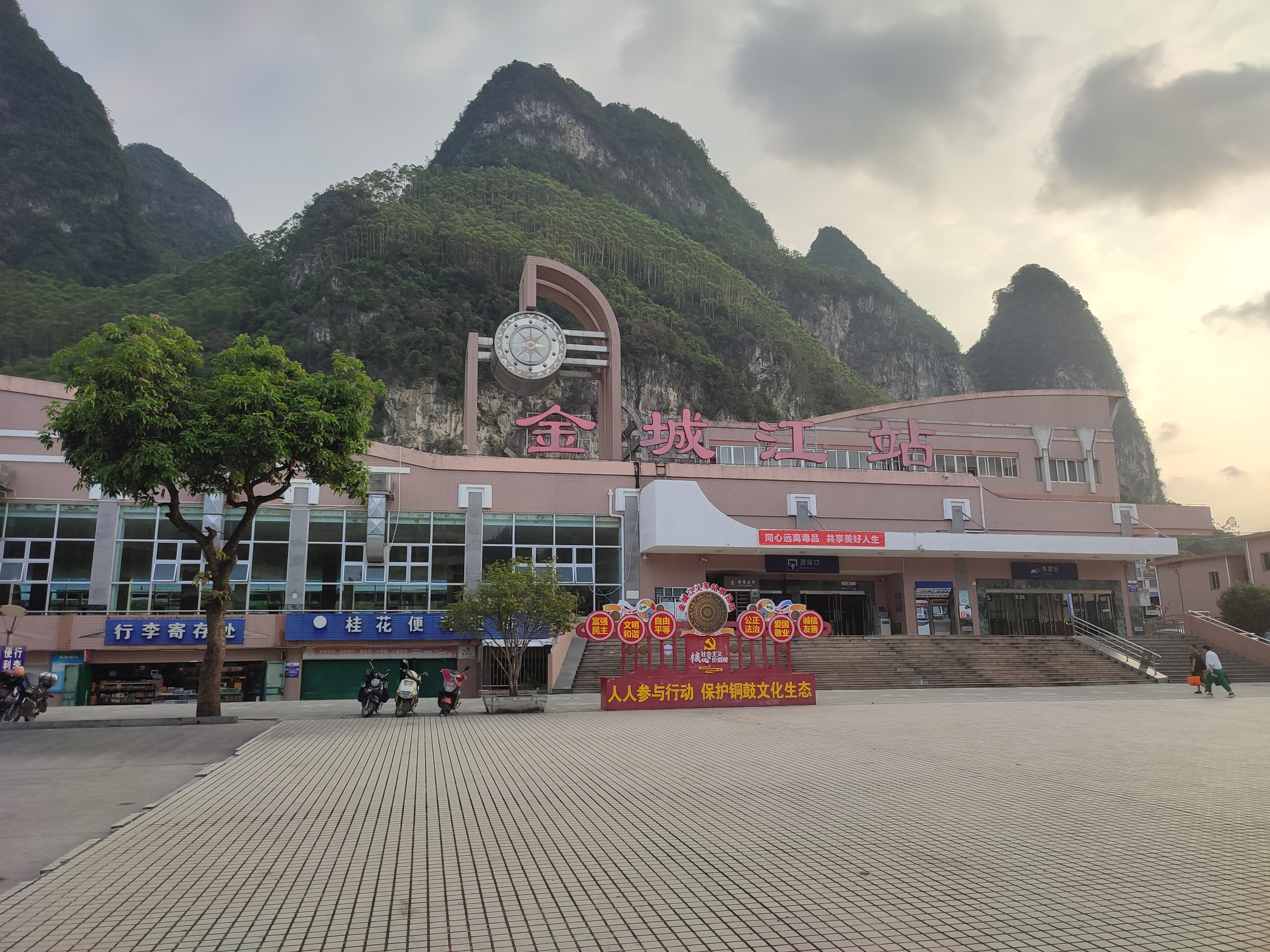
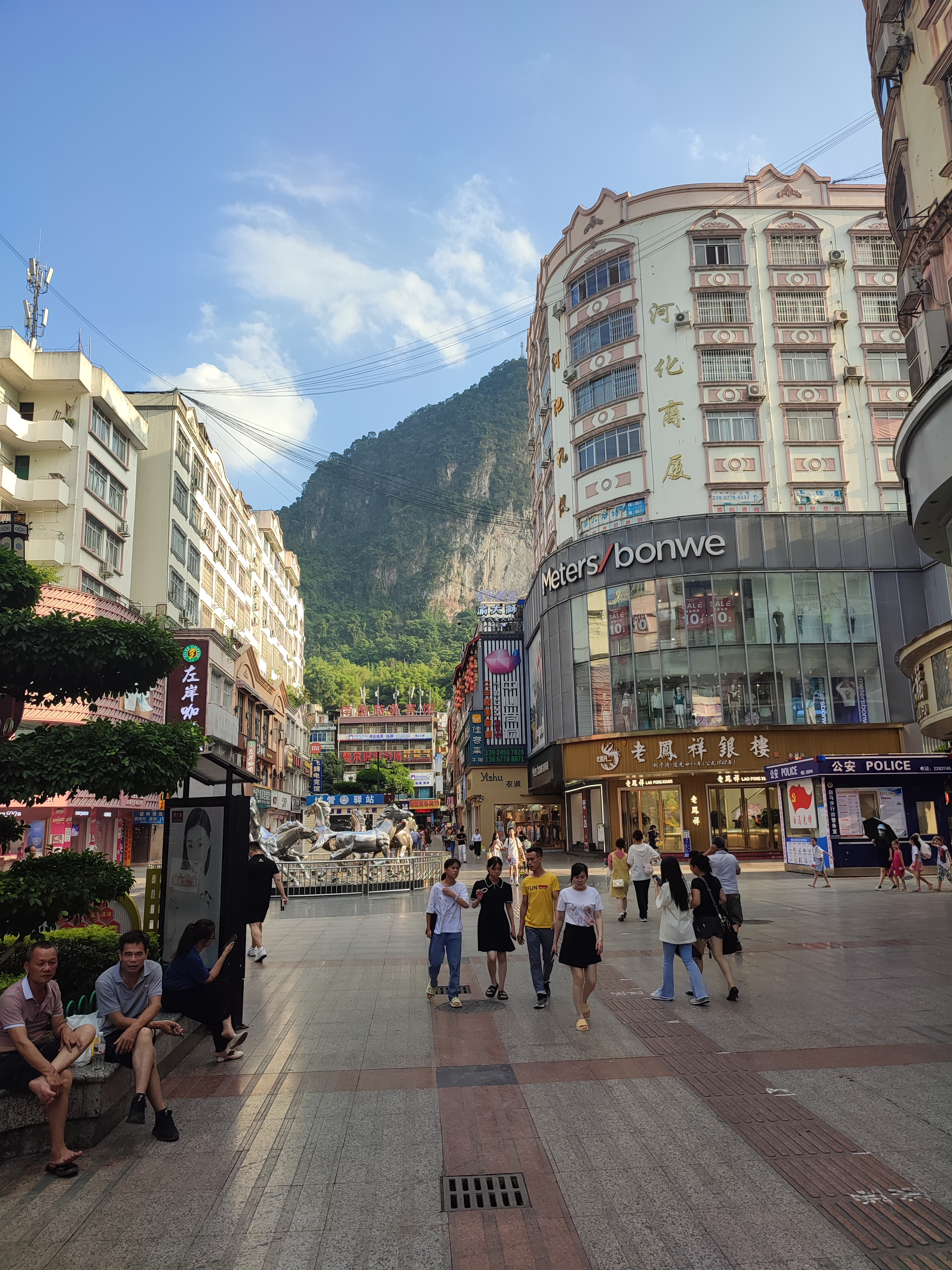
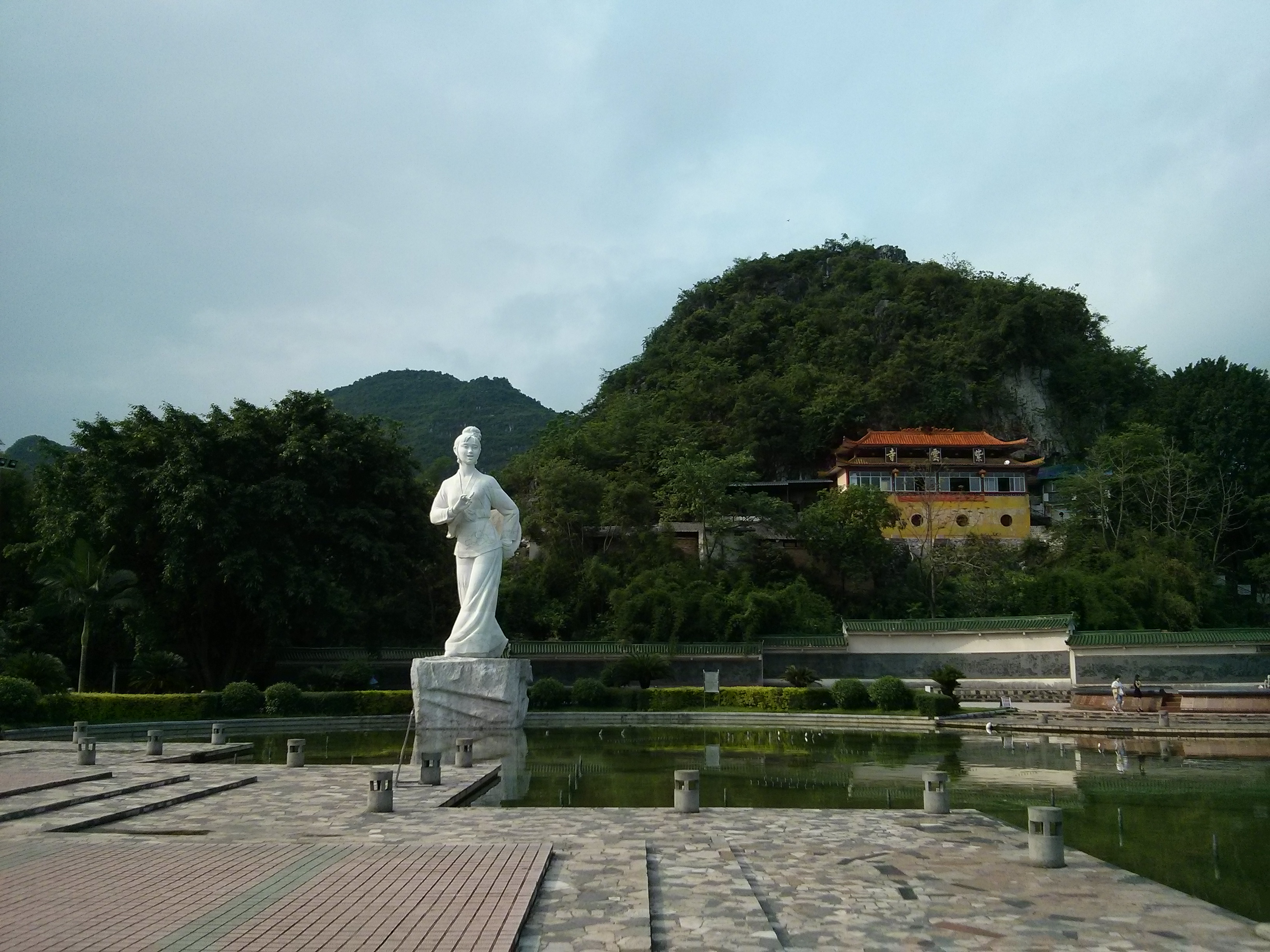
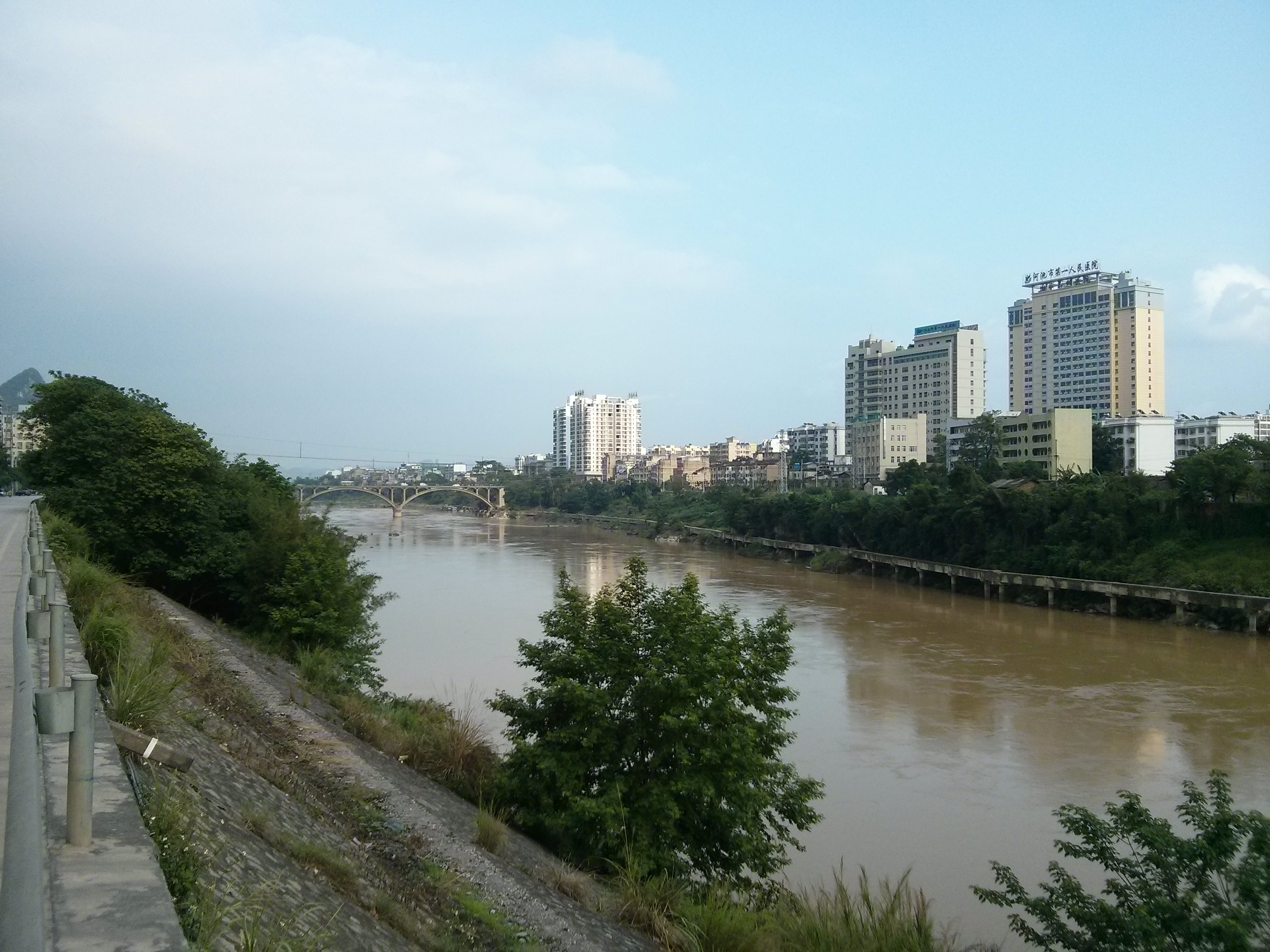
- Clockwise from top: View of Jinchengjiang from Qian An Hotel, Bai Ma Jie street in the Jinchengjiang city center, view of the city from Yizhou Bridge, Liu Sanjie square in Yizhou, Jinchengjiang station

- Location of Hechi City jurisdiction in Guangxi

- Location in China
- Coordinates (Hechi municipal government): 24°41′35″N 108°05′06″E
- Country: People's Republic of China
- Region: Guangxi
- County-level divisions: 2 district 4 counties 5 autonomous counties
- Municipal seat: Yizhou District

Area
  - Total: 33,500 km^{2} (12,900 sq mi)
- Elevation: 195 m (640 ft)

Population (2010)
  - Total: 3,991,900
  - Density: 119/km^{2} (309/sq mi)

GDP
  - Total: CN¥ 104.2 billion US$ 16.2 billion
  - Per capita: CN¥ 30,461; US$ 4,722
- Time zone: UTC+8 (China Standard)
- Postal code: 547000
- Area code: 0778
- ISO 3166 code: CN-GX-12
- Licence plate prefixes: 桂M
- Website: hechi.gov.cn

Hechi

Chinese name
- Chinese: 河池
- Literal meaning: river pool
Transcriptions
Standard Mandarin
- Hanyu Pinyin: Héchí

Zhuang name
- Zhuang: Hozciz
- 1957 orthography: Hoƨciƨ

Hechi (Chinese: 河池) is a prefecture-level city in the northwest of the Guangxi Zhuang Autonomous Region, People's Republic of China, bordering Guizhou to the north. In June 2002 it gained city status. Its capital is Yizhou (Chinese: 宜州（广西）).

== History ==
Hechi was known in ancient times as Qingyuan Prefecture, with its seat of government in Yishan (present-day Yizhou District, Hechi). During the Republic of China era, the traditional prefecture system was abolished nationwide, and the Yishan Prefecture (Special Administrative Region) was subsequently established. In 1953, the seat of Hechi County was moved from Hechi Town to Jinchengjiang Town. In 2002, the Hechi Prefecture was abolished and the prefecture-level city of Hechi was established, with its administrative seat located in Jinchengjiang District. In 2016, the seat of Hechi City was relocated to Yizhou District to realign with historical facts.

== Geography and climate ==
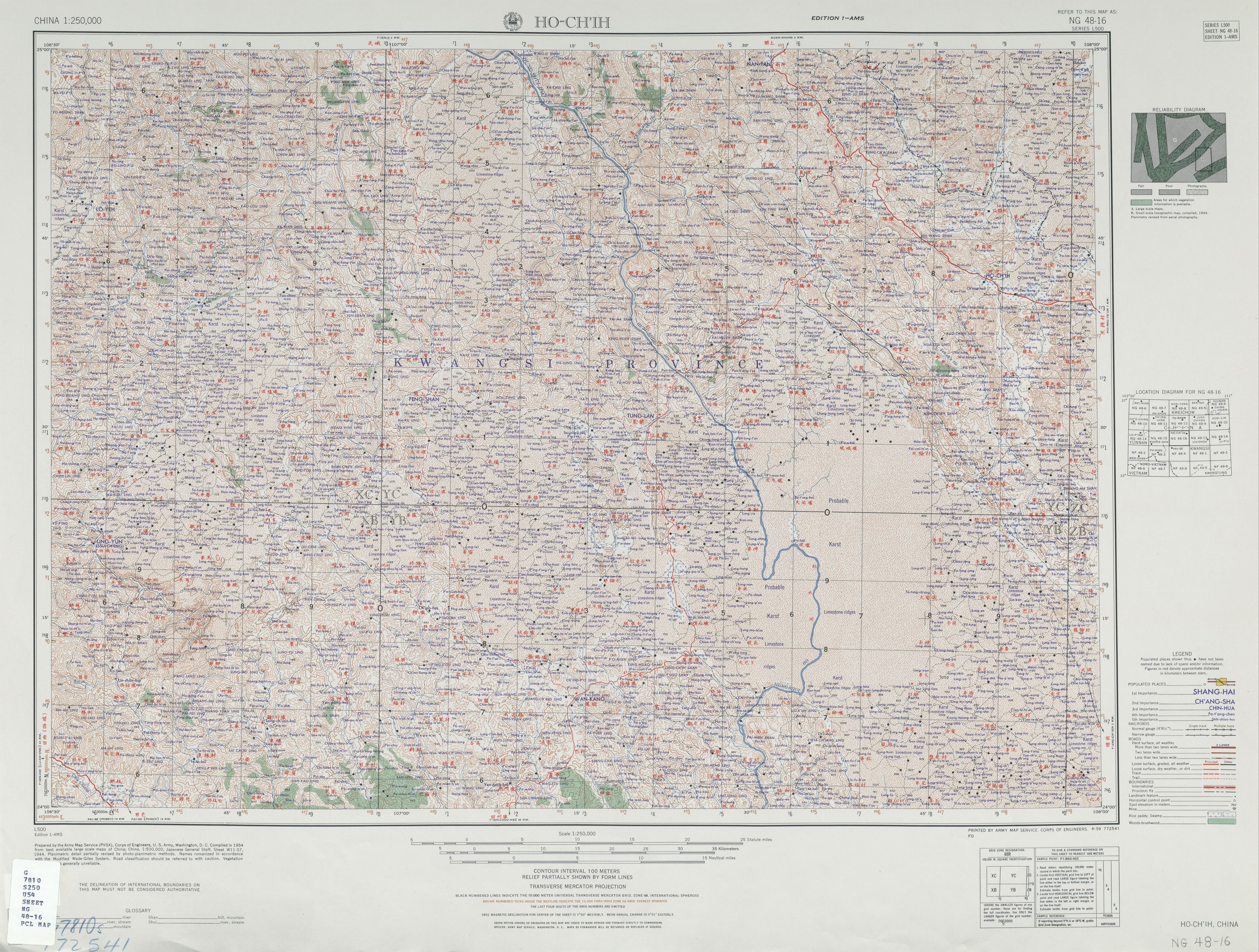
Hechi (labelled as HO-CH'IH 河池 on a 1954 US Army Service map)

Hechi is located in northwestern Guangxi on the southern end of the Yunnan–Guizhou Plateau. The total area is 33,500 km^{2} (12,900 sq mi), with elevations increasing from southeast to northwest. It is very mountainous with ranges including in the north the Jiuwanda Mountains, in the northwest the Phoenix Mountains, in the east the Fengling Mountains, in the west, the Duyang Mountains, and in the southwest the Green Dragon Mountains. The tallest mountain is "Nameless Peak" with an elevation of 1,693 metres (5,554 ft). Bordering prefecture-level divisions are Liuzhou to the east, Laibin to the southeast, Nanning to the south, and Baise to the southwest in Guangxi and Qiannan Buyei and Miao Autonomous Prefecture, Guizhou to the north.

Hechi has a monsoon-influenced humid subtropical climate (Köppen Cwa) and is generally overcast. The short and mild winters begin dry but become progressively rainier and cloudier. Early spring is the cloudiest time of year, though the monsoonal rains do not arrive until May. Summer is long, hot, and humid, and is the sunniest season. Autumn is warmer and drier than spring. The monthly 24-hour average temperature ranges from 10.9 °C (51.6 °F) in January to 28.2 °C (82.8 °F) in July, and the annual mean is 20.8 °C (69.4 °F). Annual rainfall averages around 1,533 mm (60.4 in), over 65% of which falls from May to August. With monthly percent possible sunshine ranging from 14% in January to 43% in August, the city receives 1,238 hours of bright sunshine annually.

Climate data for Hechi, elevation 260 m (850 ft), (1991–2020 normals, extremes 1955–present)
Month	Jan	Feb	Mar	Apr	May	Jun	Jul	Aug	Sep	Oct	Nov	Dec	Year
Record high °C (°F)	31.5 (88.7)	34.5 (94.1)	35.7 (96.3)	37.8 (100.0)	38.3 (100.9)	39.3 (102.7)	39.4 (102.9)	39.7 (103.5)	38.2 (100.8)	35.6 (96.1)	33.3 (91.9)	30.1 (86.2)	39.7 (103.5)
Mean daily maximum °C (°F)	14.2 (57.6)	16.8 (62.2)	20.1 (68.2)	25.6 (78.1)	29.3 (84.7)	31.2 (88.2)	32.7 (90.9)	33.0 (91.4)	31.2 (88.2)	27.0 (80.6)	22.4 (72.3)	17.1 (62.8)	25.0 (77.1)
Daily mean °C (°F)	10.9 (51.6)	13.2 (55.8)	16.3 (61.3)	21.4 (70.5)	25.0 (77.0)	27.1 (80.8)	28.2 (82.8)	28.1 (82.6)	26.3 (79.3)	22.3 (72.1)	17.8 (64.0)	12.9 (55.2)	20.8 (69.4)
Mean daily minimum °C (°F)	8.7 (47.7)	10.7 (51.3)	13.8 (56.8)	18.5 (65.3)	21.8 (71.2)	24.3 (75.7)	25.1 (77.2)	24.8 (76.6)	22.9 (73.2)	19.2 (66.6)	14.7 (58.5)	10.2 (50.4)	17.9 (64.2)
Record low °C (°F)	−2.0 (28.4)	0.2 (32.4)	2.5 (36.5)	7.7 (45.9)	12.9 (55.2)	16.3 (61.3)	19.9 (67.8)	19.2 (66.6)	14.7 (58.5)	9.0 (48.2)	2.2 (36.0)	0.2 (32.4)	−2.0 (28.4)
Average precipitation mm (inches)	43.6 (1.72)	40.8 (1.61)	72.8 (2.87)	100.6 (3.96)	230.8 (9.09)	325.3 (12.81)	258.2 (10.17)	183.3 (7.22)	117.4 (4.62)	80.5 (3.17)	46.7 (1.84)	33.1 (1.30)	1,533.1 (60.38)
Average precipitation days (≥ 0.1 mm)	12.0	11.4	16.3	14.9	15.2	17.2	17.1	14.4	9.9	8.2	9.2	8.2	154
Average snowy days	0.4	0.1	0	0	0	0	0	0	0	0	0	0.2	0.7
Average relative humidity (%)	75	75	78	77	77	80	79	77	74	73	73	71	76
Mean monthly sunshine hours	46.3	51.2	54.9	81.2	109.9	96.6	150.6	173.0	151.4	123.4	109.0	90.0	1,237.5
Percentage possible sunshine	14	16	15	21	27	24	36	43	41	35	33	27	28
Source 1: China Meteorological Administration extremes
Source 2: Weather China

== Administration ==
Hechi has 2 urban district, 4 counties, and 5 autonomous counties.

District:

- Jinchengjiang District (金城江区)
- Yizhou District (宜州区)

Counties:

- Nandan County (南丹县)
- Tian'e County (天峨县)
- Fengshan County (凤山县)
- Donglan County (东兰县)

Autonomous counties:

- Bama Yao Autonomous County (巴马瑶族自治县)
- Du'an Yao Autonomous County (都安瑶族自治县)
- Dahua Yao Autonomous County (大化瑶族自治县)
- Luocheng Mulao Autonomous County (罗城仫佬族自治县)
- Huanjiang Maonan Autonomous County (环江毛南族自治县)

Map
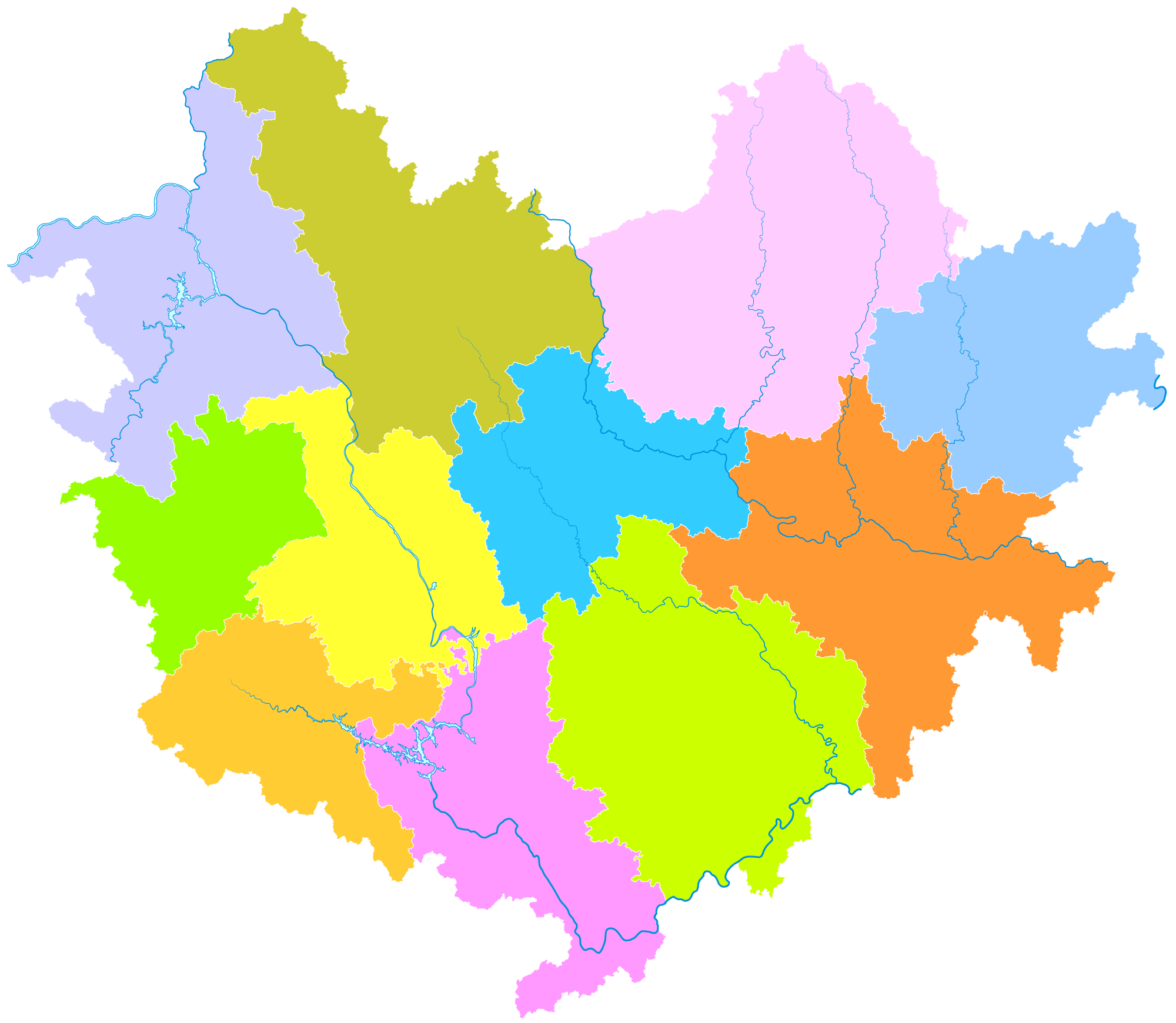

== Demographics ==
In 2010 Hechi's population was 3,991,900. 83.89% (2,826,400) of the people belong to the national minority. Ethnic groups include Zhuang, Han, Yao, Mulao, Maonan, Miao, Dong, and Shui. In these ethnic groups, Zhuang population was 2,542,852 (63.7%), Yao was 365,910 (9.16%). It is home to Guangxi's largest national minority population. By the end of 2024, the total registered population of the city is 4.308,900, and the resident population of the city is 3,313,500.

English name	Simplified Chinese	Pinyin	Zhuang	Area	Population (2010)
Jinchengjiang District	金城江区	Jīnchéngjiāng Qū	Ginhcwngzgyan Gih	2,340	308,133.01 (73% of the people belong to the Zhuang ethnic group, 2010)
Yizhou District	宜州区	Yízhōu Qū	Yizcou Gih	3,869	628,655.86 (74.01% of the people belong to the Zhuang ethnic group, 2010)
Nandan County	南丹县	Nándān Xiàn	Namzdan Yen	3,916	291,427.84 (33% of the people belong to the Zhuang ethnic group, 2010)
Tian'e County	天峨县	Tiān'é Xiàn	Dienhngoz Yen	3,291	156,615.5 (57% of the people belong to the Zhuang ethnic group, 2010)
Fengshan County	凤山县	Fèngshān Xiàn	Fonghsan Yen	1,738	195,716.15 (58% of the people belong to the Zhuang ethnic group, 2010)
Donglan County	东兰县	Dōnglán Xiàn	Dunghlanz Yen	2,435	295,521.3 (85% of the people belong to the Zhuang ethnic group, 2010)
Luocheng Mulao Autonomous County	罗城仫佬族自治县	Luóchéng Mùlǎozú Zìzhìxiàn	Lozcwngz Bouxmohlaujcuz Swci Yen	2,658	369,229.83 (31.7% of the people belong to the Zhuang ethnic group, 2010)
Huanjiang Maonan Autonomous County	环江毛南族自治县	Huánjiāng Máonánzú Zìzhìxiàn	Vanzgyangh Mauznamzcuz Swci Yen	4,558	361,827.23 (69.71% of the people belong to the Zhuang ethnic group, 2010)
Bama Yao Autonomous County	巴马瑶族自治县	Bāmǎ Yáozú Zìzhìxiàn	Bahmax Yauzcuz Swci Yen	1,966	266,722.46 (70.13% of the people belong to the Zhuang ethnic group, 2010)
Du'an Yao Autonomous County	都安瑶族自治县	Dū'ān Yáozú Zìzhìxiàn	Duhnganh Yauzcuz Swci Yen	4,095	702,200 (73.98% of the people belong to the Zhuang ethnic group, 2010)
Dahua Yao Autonomous County	大化瑶族自治县	Dàhuà Yáozú Zìzhìxiàn	Dava Yauzcuz Swci Yen	2,754	446,236.08 (33.23% of the people belong to the Zhuang ethnic group, 2010)

- These figures are based on the following official statistics:

== Economy ==
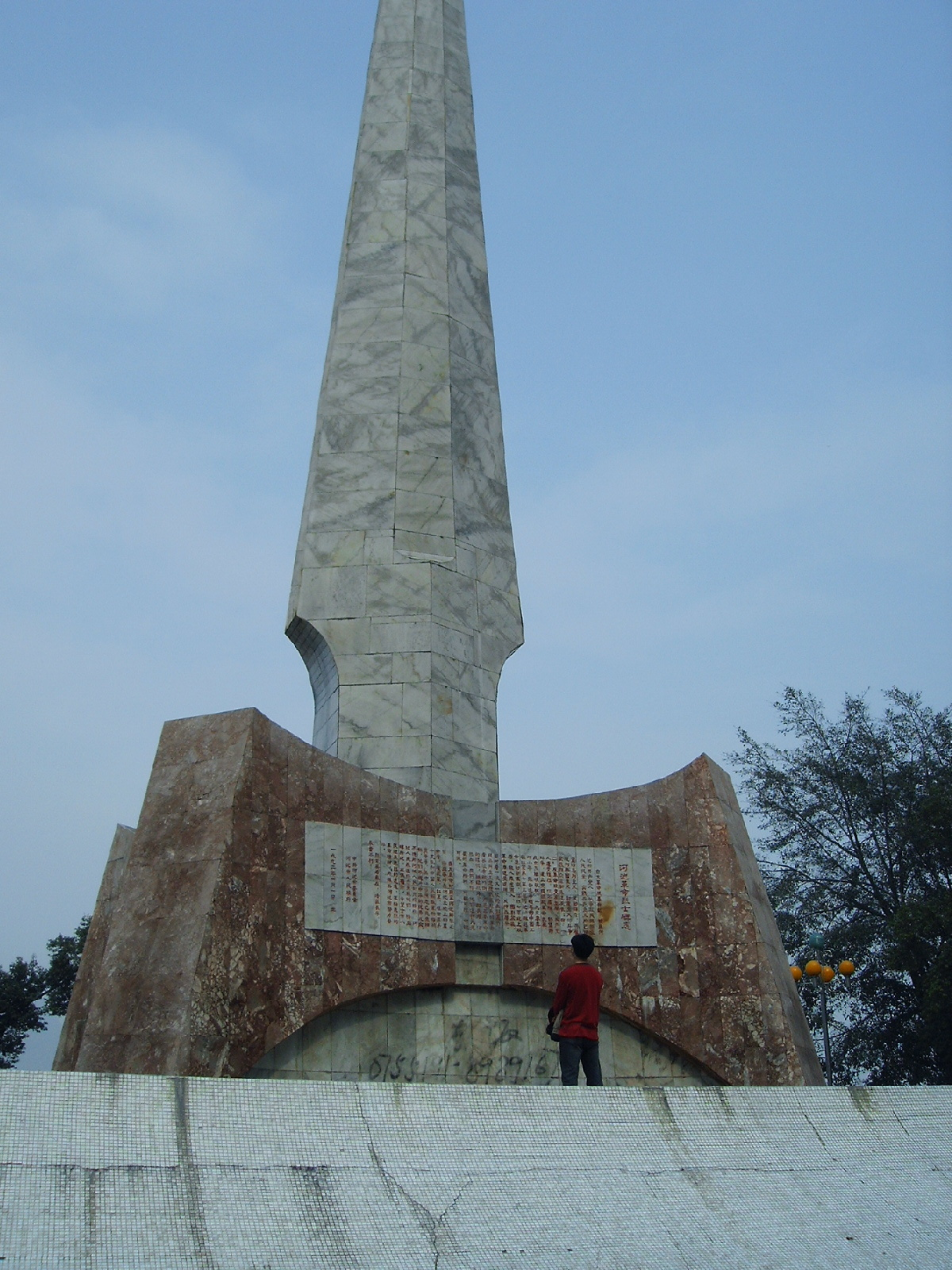
Jinchengjiang Army Monument

=== Minerals ===
Hechi is one of Guangxi's most important mineral producers. All of Hechi's counties have large quantities of high quality mineral resources. They include but are not limited to tin, antimony, gold, zinc, indium, copper, iron, silver, manganese, and arsenic. It is a major source of gold for both China and the global market. Limestone and marble are also produced.

=== Water ===
Due to Hechi's tropical wet climate, water power is also a major resource. Each year, more than 25 km^{3} (6.0 cu mi) of water flows through Hechi; 13% of all of Guangxi's water. There are more than 630 streams, creeks, and rivers with a combined length of more than 5,130 km (3,190 mi). Hydropwer facilities on these rivers produce more than 10 gigawatts of electricity; half of Guangxi's hydropower energy.

=== Agriculture ===
Hechi's climate, weather, and soil make it a major agricultural center. More than 400 types of crops including oranges, pineapple, corn, lotus root, casava, sugarcane, tobacco, vegetables, melons, mulberry, mushrooms and more than 100 different kinds of rice are grown here. Sugarcane is a major crop with more than 220,000 tons of refined sugar produced each year from 360 km^{2} (140 sq mi) of cane. Oil plants such as peanuts, sesame, and grape are also important.

Fruit make up a significant portion of Hechi's agriculture. There are more than 200 kinds of fruit found here. 120,000 tons of fruit are grown annually on more than 310 km^{2} (120 sq mi) of land.

=== Forestry ===
Forest products are another important industry. Hechi has more than 10,000 km^{2} (3,900 sq mi) of forest. More than 200 species of wild plants can be used in Chinese medicine.

== Flora and fauna ==
Due to its tropical wet climate, Hechi has an amazing level of biodiversity. There are more than 1800 species of plants, 150 species of trees, 700 species of insects, 50 species of fish, and 60 species of land animals, many of which are rare and protected. Animals such as langurs, pangolins, and wild cats can be found in Hechi's forested mountains.

== Transportation ==
=== Air ===
- Hechi Jinchengjiang Airport (IATA: HCJ)

=== Rail ===
- Hechi railway station, part of the Guizhou–Guangxi Railway
