= List of military engagements of the Second Sino-Japanese War =

This is a list of military engagements of the Second Sino-Japanese War encompassing land, naval, and air engagements as well as campaigns, military operations and sieges.

The list covers the conflict from the Mukden incident in 1931 to the end of the war in 1945.

Japanese victory (and allies)
Chinese victory (and allies)
Another result*

*e.g. indecisive/inconclusive engagements, disputed claims of victory or unknown results.

== Initial clashes: 1931–1936 ==
Name	Location	Start date	End date	Belligerents	Result
Mukden incident	Mukden, Manchuria	18 September 1931	19 September 1931	Japan; China	Japanese victory
Japanese invasion of Manchuria	Manchuria	18 September 1931	27 February 1932	Japan; China	Japanese victory
Counterinsurgency in Manchuria	Manchuria	4 November 1931	July 1942	Japan; Manchukuo China; Korean communists	Japanese-Manchukuo victory
Jiangqiao campaign	Heilongjiang, Manchuria	4 November 1931	18 November 1931	Japan; China	Japanese victory
Resistance at Nenjiang Bridge	Nen River, Manchuria	4 November 1931		Japan; China	Japanese victory
Jinzhou Operation	Liaoning, Manchuria	21 December 1931	3 January 1932	Japan; China	Japanese victory
Defense of Harbin	Harbin, Manchuria	25 January 1932	4 February 1932	Japan; China	Japanese victory
January 28 incident	Shanghai	28 January 1932	3 March 1932	Japan; China	Ceasefire
Defense of the Great Wall	Great Wall of China	1 January 1933	31 May 1933	Japan; Manchukuo China	Japanese-Manchukuo victory
Battle of Rehe	Rehe, Manchuria	21 February 1933	1 March 1933	Japan; Manchukuo China	Japanese-Manchukuo victory
Actions in Inner Mongolia (1933–1936)	Inner Mongolia	April 1933	December 1936	Japan; Manchukuo; Collaborationist Chinese Army; Mengjiang China	1933 Japanese victory; 1936 Chinese victory
Suiyuan campaign	Suiyuan, Inner Mongolia	20 October 1936	19 December 1936	Japan; Mengjiang; Grand Han Righteous Army China	Chinese victory

== War: 1937–1945 ==
Name	Location	Start date	End date	Belligerents	Result
Marco Polo Bridge incident	Beijing	7 July 1937	9 July 1937	Japan; China	Ceasefire
Battle of Beiping–Tianjin	Beijing and Tianjin	7 July 1937	8 August 1937	Japan; East Hebei China	Japanese victory
Langfang incident	Langfang	25 July 1937	26 July 1937	Japan; China	Japanese victory
Guanganmen incident	Beijing	26 July 1937		Japan; China	Inconclusive
Tongzhou mutiny	Tongzhou, Beijing	29 July 1937		Japan; East Hebei	Japanese victory
Operation Chahar	Suiyuan, Inner Mongolia	8 August 1937	17 October 1937	Japan; Mengjiang; Manchukuo China	Japanese victory
Battle of Shanghai	Shanghai	13 August 1937	26 November 1937	Japan; China	Japanese victory
Battle of Jianqiao	Hangzhou, Zhejiang	14 August 1937		Japan; China	Chinese victory
Beiping–Hankou Railway Operation	Beijing–Hankou railway	Mid-August 1937	December 1937	Japan; China	Japanese victory
Tianjin–Pukou Railway Operation	Tianjin–Pukou railway	21 August 1937	11 January 1938	Japan; China	Japanese victory
Battle of Taiyuan	Taiyuan	1 September 1937	9 November 1938	Japan; Mengjiang China; Kuomintang; CCP	Japanese victory
Battle of Pingxingguan	Pingxingguan, Shanxi	22 September 1937	29 September 1937	Japan China; CCP	Japanese victory
Battle of Xinkou	Niangzi Pass and Taiyuan	11 October 1937	5 November 1937	Japan China; Kuomintang; CCP	Japanese victory
Defense of Sihang Warehouse	Zhabei, Shanghai	27 October 1937	31 October 1937	Japan; China	Japanese victory
Battle of Nanking	Nanjing	11 November 1937	13 December 1937	Japan China; Soviet Union	Japanese victory
USS Panay incident	Yangtze	12 December 1937		Japan; United States	Japanese victory
Battle of Northern and Eastern Henan	Henan	7 February 1938	10 June 1938	Japan; China	Japanese victory
Taihoku Airstrike	Taihoku, Taiwan	8 February 1938		Japan; China	Chinese victory
Battle of Xuzhou	Xuzhou	9 February 1938	21 May 1938	Japan; China	Japanese victory
Bombing of Chongqing	Chongqing	18 February 1938	19 December 1944	Japan; China	Mixed outcome
Battle of Taierzhuang	Tai'erzhuang	22 March 1938	7 April 1938	Japan; China	Chinese victory
Amoy Operation	Amoy, Fujian	10 May 1938	12 May 1938	Japan; China	Japanese victory
Battle of Lanfeng	Kaifeng and Shangqiu, Henan	20 May 1938	10 June 1938	Japan; China	Japanese victory
Battle of Wuhan	Wuhan	11 June 1938	27 October 1938	Japan; China	Japanese victory
Dongwuling Ambush (1938)	Dongwuling, Shanxi	1 August 1938	2 August 1938	Japan; China	Chinese victory
Battle of Wanjialing	Wanjialing	10 August 1938	10 October 1938	Japan; China	Chinese victory
Canton Operation	Canton, Guangzhou	12 October 1938	29 October 1938	Japan; China	Japanese victory
Hainan Island Operation	Hainan	9 February 1939	11 February 1939	Japan; China	Japanese victory
Battle of Nanchang	Nanchang	17 March 1939	9 May 1939	Japan; China	Japanese victory
Battle of Suixian–Zaoyang	Suizhou and Zaoyang, Hubei	20 April 1939	24 May 1939	Japan; China	Chinese victory
Tientsin incident	Tianjin	14 June 1939	20 August 1939	Japan; United Kingdom	Compromise solution
Swatow Operation	Shantou	21 June 1939	27 June 1939	Japan; China	Japanese victory
East Shanxi Operation	Shanxi	3 July 1939	25 August 1939	Japan; China	Japanese victory
Battle of Changsha (1939)	Changsha	14 September 1939	13 October 1939	Japan; China	Chinese victory
Battle of South Guangxi	Guangxi	15 November 1939	30 November 1940	Japan; China	Mixed outcome
1939–1940 Winter Offensive	Anhui, Guangdong, Hubei, Henan, Hunan, Jiangxi, Shanxi, Shandong and Suiyuan	26 November 1939	3 April 1940	Japan; China	Japanese victory
Battle of Baotou	Baotou, Suiyuan	17 December 1939	24 December 1939	Japan; Mengjiang China	Japanese victory
Battle of Kunlun Pass	Nanning, Guangxi	18 December 1939	11 January 1940	Japan; China	Chinese victory
Ouei Operation	Guangdong	24 December 1939	14 January 1940	Japan; China	Japanese victory
Battle of West Suiyuan	Suiyuan	January 1940	February 1940	Japan; Mengjiang China	Chinese victory
Battle of Binyang	Binyang, Guangxi	28 January 1940	13 February 1940	Japan; China	Japanese victory
Battle of Wuyuan	Wuyuan, Inner Mongolia	16 March 1940	3 April 1940	Japan; China	Chinese victory
Battle of South Shanxi (1940)	Shanxi	17 April 1940	20 June 1940	Japan; China	Japanese victory
Battle of Zaoyang–Yichang	Zaoyang and Yichang, Hubei	1 May 1940	18 June 1940	Japan; China	Japanese victory
Operation 101	Chongqing	17 May 1940	5 September 1940	Japan; China	Mixed outcome
Hundred Regiments Offensive	Shanxi, Hebei, Henan, Chahar	20 August 1940	24 January 1941	Japan; China	Chinese victory
Jiangnan Operation	Anhui and Jiangsu	5 October 1940	29 October 1940	Japan; China	Japanese victory
Battle of Guanjianao	Guanjianao, Wuxiang, Shanxi	30 October 1940	31 October 1940	Japan; China	Japanese victory
Central Hubei Operation	Hubei	25 November 1940	30 November 1940	Japan; China	Both sides claimed victory
Battle of South Henan	Henan	30 January 1941	1 March 1941	Japan; China	Both sides claimed victory
Western Hubei Operation	Hubei	6 March 1941	26 March 1941	Japan; China	Chinese victory
Battle of Shanggao	Shanggao, Jiangxi	6 March 1941	26 March 1941	Japan; China	Chinese victory
Jiangbei Operation	Hubei	6 May 1941	25 May 1941	Japan; China	Stalemate
Battle of South Shanxi	Shanxi	7 May 1941	27 May 1941	Japan; China	Japanese victory
Battle of Changsha (1941)	Changsha	6 September 1941	8 October 1941	Japan; China	Both sides claimed victory
Japanese invasion of Burma	Burma	14 December 1941	28 May 1942	Japan; BIA; Thailand China; United Kingdom; India; United States	Axis victory
Burma campaign	Burma	14 December 1941	13 September 1945	Japan; Burma; Azad Hind; Thailand Allies (China; United Kingdom; United States…)	Allied victory
Battle of Changsha (1941–1942)	Changsha	24 December 1941	15 January 1942	Japan; China	Chinese victory
Suzhou-Jiaxing-Shanghai Suppression Campaign (1942)	Suzhou and Jiaxing	20 February 1942	18 March 1942	Japan; China	Japanese victory
Battle of the Yunnan–Burma Road	Shanxi	18 March 1942	12 July 1942	Japan; Thailand China; United Kingdom; United States	Axis victory
Battle of Tachiao	Pyu	18 March 1942	19 March 1942	Japan; China	Japanese victory
Battle of Oktwin	Oktwin	20 March 1942	23 March 1942	Japan; China	Japanese victory
Battle of Toungoo	Toungoo	24 March 1942	30 March 1942	Japan; China	Japanese victory
Battle of Yenangyaung	Yenangyaung	16 April 1942	19 April 1942	Japan China; United Kingdom; India	Japanese victory
Zhejiang-Jiangxi campaign	Zhejiang and Jiangxi	15 May 1942	4 September 1942	Japan China; United States	Japanese victory
Defence of the Salween River	Salween River	May 1942		Japan China; United States	Mixed outcome
Jiangbei Annihilation Campaign	Hubei	February 1943	March 1943	Japan; China	Japanese victory
1943 Spring Operation in the Taihang Mountains	Taihang Mountains	20 April 1943	22 May 1943	Japan; China	Japanese victory
Battle of West Hubei	Hubei	5 May 1943	11 June 1943	Japan China; United States	Allied victory
Battle of Northern Burma and Western Yunnan	Burma and Yunnan	October 1943	March 1945	Japan; Thailand China; United Kingdom; United States	Allied victory
Linnan Campaign	Linzhou, Henan	18 August 1943	26 August 1943	Japan; China	Chinese victory
Battle of Changde	Changde, Hunan	2 November 1943	5 January 1944	Japan; China	Chinese victory
Hsinchu air raid	Hsinchu, Taiwan	25 November 1943		Japan China; United States	Allied victory
Operation Ichi-Go	Henan, Hunan and Guangxi	19 April 1944	31 December 1944	Japan China; United States	Japanese victory
Siege of Myitkyina	Myitkyina	17 May 1944	3 August 1944	Japan; Burma China; United Kingdom; United States	Allied victory
Battle of Changsha (1944)	Changsha and Hengyang	26 May 1944	8 August 1944	Japan; China	Japanese victory
Battle of Lingbao	Shanzhou and Lingbao	1 June 1944	17 June 1944	Japan; China	Japanese victory
Battle of Ramou and Tengyue	Tengchong	2 June 1944	14 September 1944	Japan China; United States	Allied victory
Battle of Mount Song	Mount Song, Yunnan	4 June 1944	7 September 1944	Japan China; United States	Allied victory
Battle of Mogaung	Mogaung	6 June 1944	26 June 1944	Japan China; United Kingdom; United States	Allied victory
Battle of Hengyang	Hengyang, Hunan	23 June 1944	8 August 1944	Japan China; United States	Japanese victory
Battle of Guilin–Liuzhou	Guilin and Liuzhou, Guangxi	16 August 1944	24 November 1944	Japan China; United States	Japanese victory
Bombing of Liuzhai (1944)	Liuzhai	25 or 27 November 1944		United States	Accidental friendly fire incident
Bombing of Hankou	Hankou	18 December 1944		Japan; United States	American victory
Battle of West Henan–North Hubei	Henan and Hubei	21 March 1945	11 May 1945	Japan; China	Stalemate
Battle of West Hunan	Hunan	6 April 1945	7 June 1945	Japan China; United States	Allied victory
Second Guangxi campaign	Guangxi	15 April 1945	21 August 1945	Japan; China	Chinese victory
Attack on the Kaifeng Yellow River Railway Bridge	Kaifeng, Yellow River	9 August 1945		Japan China; United States	Allied victory
