= Free China (Second Sino-Japanese War) =

Areas of China not under the control of the invading Imperial Japanese Army

- The extent of Japanese control of China as of 1940. The area in white constitutes "Free China".
- Traditional Chinese: 中華民國自由地區
- Simplified Chinese: 中华民国自由地区
- Literal meaning: Free Area of the Republic of China (full form used only occasionally)
Transcriptions
Standard Mandarin
- Hanyu Pinyin: Zhōnghuá Mínguó Zìyóu Dìqū
- Bopomofo: ㄓㄨㄥ ㄏㄨㄚˊ ㄇㄧㄣˊ ㄍㄨㄛˊ ㄗˋ ㄧㄡˊ ㄉㄧˋ ㄑㄩ
- Gwoyeu Romatzyh: Jonghwa Min'gwo Tzyh'you Dihchiu
- Wade–Giles: Chung¹-hua² Min²-kuo² Tzŭ⁴-yu² Ti⁴-chü¹
- Tongyong Pinyin: Jhonghuá Mínguó Zìhyóu Dìcyu
- MPS2: Jūnghuá Mínguó Tz̀yóu Dìchiū
Hakka
- Pha̍k-fa-sṳ: Chûng-fà Mìn-koet Chhṳ-yù Thi-khî
Southern Min
- Hokkien POJ: Tiong-hôa Bîn-kok Chū-iû Tē-khu
- Tâi-lô: Tiong-hûa Bîn-kok Tsū-iû Tē-khu
Eastern Min
- Fuzhou BUC: Dṳ̆ng-huà Mìng-guók Cê̤ṳ-iù Dê-kṳ̆

Alternative Chinese name
- Traditional Chinese: 國統區
- Simplified Chinese: 国统区
- Literal meaning: Kuomintang-controlled area
Transcriptions
Standard Mandarin
- Hanyu Pinyin: Guótǒngqū
- Wade–Giles: Kuo2-tʻung3-chʻü1

The term Free China, in the context of the Second Sino-Japanese War, refers to those areas of China not under the control of the Imperial Japanese Army or any of its puppet governments, such as Manchukuo, the Mengjiang government in Suiyuan and Chahar, or the Provisional Government of the Republic of China in Beiping. The term came into more frequent use after the Battle of Nanking, when Chiang Kai-shek evacuated the government of the Republic of China to Chungking (modern Chongqing). It was also sometimes referred to as the Chungking Government or simply "Chungking," such as in the surrender speech of Hirohito to the Japanese military.

== History ==
In the final days of the Battle of Nanking, the Republic of China's National Revolutionary Army helped to evacuate the Chiang Kai-shek government to Chongqing, which was declared the provisional capital of the Republic of China. The Japanese, following their victory at Nanjing, created yet another puppet government, the Reformed Government of the Republic of China, which was later merged with the Provisional Government of the Republic of China to create the Wang Jingwei Government. Many civilians from Japanese-controlled areas of China fled to Free China.

Conflict between the Communists and Kuomintang continued in the area of Free China, the most severe example being the New Fourth Army Incident. At the same time, Japanese action against the Communists and Nationalists continued; Chongqing was bombed 268 times, making it the most-frequently bombed city in all of World War II. Japan tried to take full control of Guangxi in the Second Guangxi campaign of 1940, but Chinese forces inflicted a major defeat upon the Japanese at the Battle of Kunlun Pass forcing Japan to abandon Guangxi in 1940. The front line of the war was largely stabilised between 1940-1944 as Japan lost multiple battles including the Battle of Changsha (1939), Battle of Changsha (1941), Battle of Changsha (1941–1942) and Battle of Changde when it tried to take and hold new territory. However, the Nationalist government transferred hundreds of thousands of Chinese troops away from the front with Japan towards western provinces like Gansu, Qinghai and Xinjiang between 1942-1944 in order to seize Xinjiang from the Soviet Red Army and pro-Soviet warlord Sheng Shicai bringing Xinjiang under "Free China" and weakening China's front lines with Japan. The Soviet Union then backed the Ili rebellion in the Dzungaria region of Xinjiang against Nationalist China in 1944 where 120,000 Chinese soldiers were fighting against the Soviet backed rebels. It was only in December 1944, that the Japanese Operation Ichi-Go succeeded in taking control of Guangxi, giving them a continuous railway link between Manchukuo and Southeast Asia. The Japanese planned an invasion of Sichuan in an attempt to destroy the KMT government in Chongqing but were never able to implement it. In 1945, the Japanese seized airbases in the West Henan and North Hubei, but they were defeated in an attempt to invade West Hunan and expelled from occupied areas in Guangxi before the final surrender. The seizure of airbases was also rendered meaningless by the fact that Americans were already bombing Japan from Pacific islands in 1945 and did not need the airbases in China.

The term "Free area of the Republic of China" was later reused by the Nationalist government after their retreat to Taiwan to contrast their territory with that of the People's Republic of China.
