= Proposed Japanese invasion of Sichuan =

Failed plan to destroy the Republic of China

- Part of the Second Sino-Japanese War
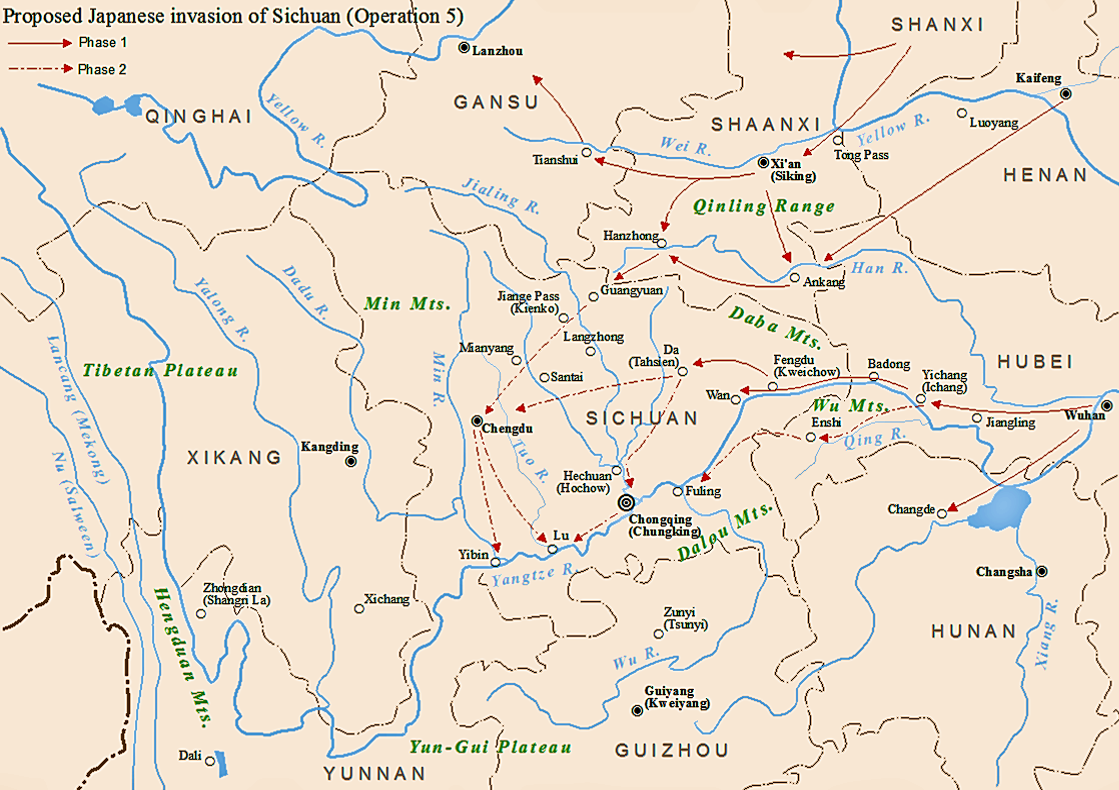
- The map showing the proposed Operation 5
Date	September 3, 1942 – January 21, 1943 (4 months, 2 weeks and 4 days); First reactivation: September 27 – December 10, 1943 (2 months, 1 week and 6 days); Second reactivation: November 7, 1944 – January 20, 1945 (2 months, 1 week and 6 days)
Location	Sichuan province in the Republic of China
Result	Chinese victory

Belligerents
China	(Empire of Japan) Japan

Commanders and leaders
(Republic of China (1912–1949)) Chiang Kai-shek	Hideki Tojo

Units involved
National Revolutionary Army	Imperial Japanese Army

Strength
200,000 troops, 300 planes	140,000 troops, 300 tanks, 500 planes

Casualties and losses
Unknown	Unknown

The proposed Japanese invasion of Sichuan (Note: Also known as the Sichuan invasion, Szechwan invasion, Chongqing Operation, Chongqing Campaign or Operation 5 (Chinese: 五號作戰)) was the Imperial Japanese Army's failed plan to destroy the Republic of China during the Second Sino-Japanese War. It was to be a stepping stone for the Empire of Japan's final control of China.

The operation started in spring of 1942, after the first phase of operations had been concluded in south China, and continued through spring of 1943. The operation is noted for Japan's sustained bombing of cities in central west China.

== Basic plan ==
The basic plan was to make a multi-front breakthrough to Sichuan from northern Shanxi, central Hubei and southern Hunan. Heavy aerial support and bombing of Chongqing was to support the advance of the Japanese Army and their Collaborationist Chinese Army puppets. Japanese Navy patrol boats from the Yangtze river were to provide further bombardment. Chiang Kai-shek discussed the invasion in his book Soviet Russia in China, stating:

The Imperial General Headquarters sent the order for drawing down 16 divisions and logistics support units from Japan reserves, Manchukuo and Southern Areas (including New Guinea and Solomon islands also) to reinforce the Japanese expeditionary forces in central China area, to prepare the principal force of ten divisions in south Shaanxi and other support group conformed by six Divisions of Yichang in Hubei amongst other Divisions located in Changde, in Hunan, for striking Sichuan and the occupation of Chongqing in September 1942.

By coincidence, September 1942 was also the time when the German Wehrmacht was closing in on Stalingrad. The invasion phase was to involve Japanese units first occupying Wanxian, from where the Japanese could advance to Chongqing-proper in echelon. To cut off the escape routes of Chinese refugees, the occupation of North Guizhou was planned, which could be used to stage an attack on Chengdu through Yibin.

The north Japanese army division would have had the option to either advance towards south Shaanxi to capture Xi'an, or towards Hanzhong to take Chengdu directly. Alternatively, Japan could have utilized airborne forces to cut off Chinese escape routes and take the Chongqing metropolitan area directly.

== Interests in Sichuan region ==
Both Chiang Kai-shek and Chiang Wei-kuo suspected that the intense bombing of Chongqing by the Japanese Navy and the Japanese Air Force was to support the diversionary Japanese operations against metropolitan Chongqing, as part of the invasion of Sichuan. It was also possible that the Japanese army hoped that a terror campaign against Chongqing would force the Chinese authorities to break from the Allies and make a separate peace with Japan.

== Sichuan invasion ==
=== Japanese plan ===
According to General Chiang Wei-kuo, should the invasion be successful, the Japanese might have intended to put Wang Jingwei's puppet regime in charge of Chongqing. The Japanese might also have persuaded Chiang Kai-shek to join Japan's Greater East Asian Co-Prosperity Sphere and to even assist in a future Japanese offensive against the Soviet Union in Siberia and Central Asia. Another possibility was the installation of a Japanese civilian or military Governor-General to administer the area as an Imperial Japanese Army fief in mainland Asia, which could later be expanded to include Tibet and Xinjiang as well.

=== Factors affecting invasion ===
Due to opposition against Japan from other Allied countries, the Sichuan invasion was not enthusiastically carried out. In particular, the United States' counter-offensive against Japan heavily undermined the possibility of an invasion. Chiang Kai-shek stated:

But in June 1942, Japanese forces suffered the humiliating defeat in the Battle of Midway, and in August the U.S. forces initiated the counteroffensive against the Solomon Islands, with a landing at Tenaru River, Guadalcanal (Operation Watchtower). The Japanese suffered frequent losses at the end of September 1942, and decided to delay the implement of invasion plan for Sichuan. Later in November, the Japanese forces having been totally defeated in Guadalcanal, (Battle of Guadalcanal, Battle of Tassafaronga and Battle of Rennel), the situation was turned around, with Japan losing all possibility to transfer with impunity its forces in the area (the Japanese were obliged to use all disposable vessels in their retreat, "Operation KE" during the night of February 1–2, 1943, the last part of the so-called "Tokyo Express"). At the end of 1942, the planning for the Sichuan Invasion was suspended.

=== Last operative attempt to invade ===
However, the Japanese Imperial General Headquarters was still in favor of an invasion. Hence the Japanese China Expeditionary Army produced a new plan for the capture of Sichuan, which was based on the previous 1942 plan. The May 1943 "Battle of West Hubei" was part of this new attempt to advance to Sichuan.

The Battle of West Hubei, known in Japanese operational planning as the Exi Campaign, was fought from 3 May to 11 June 1943. The Japanese 11th Army under Lieutenant General Isamu Yokoyama committed approximately 120,000 troops against roughly 280,000 Chinese soldiers of the 6th War Area under General Chen Cheng. Initial Japanese advances captured portions of northern Hunan and crossed the Yangtze near Baiyang, encircling elements of the Chinese 87th Army. However, the advance stalled at Shipai Fortress along the Qingjiang River, where Chinese forces fought to hold the entrance to the Three Gorges and the direct approach to Chongqing. By 11 June, Chinese forces had recovered all territory taken during the offensive. Japanese losses totaled approximately 25,000 killed and wounded, 40 aircraft destroyed, and 122 naval vessels damaged or sunk. The failure to encircle or destroy major Chinese formations effectively ended Japan's strategic ambition to reach Sichuan.

Nevertheless, by then the Nationalist Chinese armies had the support of the "Flying Tigers" (A.V.G.) of the United States, which was commanded by General Claire Chennault. In subsequent battles, the Japanese army suffered defeats at the hands of the Nationalist Chinese armies. In light of these defeats, the Japanese forces had to abandon a new offensive. During this period the Chinese Army sent seven Army envoys to Yunnan and India to clear the China–Burma route.

In fear of Chinese reinforcements through the cleared route and having sustained much losses in the Battle of Changde, the Japanese army switched their attention to Yunnan to prevent future Chinese counter-offensives from that area.

The Japanese plan to invade Sichuan in 1943 involved Xi'an in Shaanxi and Luoyang in Henan being taken by the Japanese Northern China Area Army with 4 divisions to attack Sichuan from the north, while from Yichang 2 Japanese divisions would attack Sichuan from the east, and from Guiyang in Guizhou, Hengyang, Changsha in Hunan and Hankou in Hubei 4 divisions would attack Sichuan from the south, and the forces for the plan would be based in Yuezhou, Yichang, Xinyang and Anqing. The Japanese attack at the Battle of Changde was part of this attempt by the Japanese 11th Army to reach Sichuan.

Japan attempted to invade Shaanxi in the Battle of Lingbao in 1944 but failed, getting repulsed in west Henan.

Japan failed to capture Guiyang in Guizhou in November–December 1944 at the Battle of Dushan (Battle of Tushan) (獨山戰役) was part of the Battle of South Guizhou (黔南事变). Japan again failed to invade Shaanxi in the Battle of West Henan in 1945 but was repulsed again in west Henan. Yasuji Okamura ordered the two failed Japanese attempts to invade Shaanxi via west Henan in 1944 in 1945, claiming he would achieve victory and conquer Shaanxi and Sichuan.

== Sources ==
- General Wego W.K. Chiang "How the Generalissimo Chiang Kai-shek Won the Chinese-Japanese Eight Years War, 1937–1945".
- Gen. Wego W.K. Chiang, Die Strategische Bedetung Taiwans, Taipei
- Idem. Chinese Communists Modernization Problems, Taipei, 1979
- Alphonse Max, Southeast Asia: Destiny and Reality, Montevideo, Uruguay: International Studies (Spanish translation By Dr. Santiago Rompani and Prof. Alvaro Casal), 1985.
