= Second Guangxi campaign order of battle =

The second Guangxi campaign within the second Sino-Japanese War, was fought between Japan and the Republic of China from late April 1945 to 21 August 1945.

== Japan ==
=== Army ===
11th Army - Lt. Gen. Yukio Kasahara [4] Sachio Kasahara

- 13th Division - Lieutenant-General Minetaro Yoshida [4]
  - 13th Infantry Brigade Group
    - 65th Infantry Regiment
    - 104th Infantry Regiment
    - 116th Infantry Regiment
  - 19th Mountain Artillery Regiment
  - 17th Cavalry Regiment
  - 13th Engineer Regiment
  - 13th Transport Regiment
- 22nd Division - Lieutenant-General Kasahara Kahee
  - 22nd Infantry Brigade Group
    - 84th Infantry regiment
    - 85th Infantry regiment
    - 86th Infantry regiment regimental
  - 22nd Division reconnaissance troops
  - 52nd mountain artillery regiment
  - 22nd military engineer regiment
  - 22nd transport regiment
  - Signal Communication Unit
  - Medical team
  - 1st & 2nd Field Hospital
- 27th Division [elements] - Lieutenant-General Ochiai Jinkurō
  - 27th Infantry Brigade Group
    - 1st China Garrison Infantry Regiment
    - 2nd China Garrison Infantry Regiment
    - 3rd China Garrison Infantry Regiment
  - 27th Division reconnaissance troops
  - 27th Mountain Artillery Regiment
  - 27th Military Engineer Regiment
  - 27th Transport Regiment
  - Signal Communication Unit
  - Medical team
  - Weapon Service team
  - 1st - 4th Field Hospital
  - veterinary hospital.
- 58th Division - Lieutenant-General Kawamata Osato
  - 51st Infantry brigade - Major-General Shirahama Shigetada
    - 92nd Independent infantry battalion
    - 93rd Independent infantry battalion
    - 94 Independent infantry battalion
    - 95 Independent infantry battalion
  - 52nd Infantry brigade - Major-General Nagata Fumio
    - 96th Independent infantry battalion
    - 106th Independent infantry battalion
    - 107th Independent infantry battalion
    - 108th Independent infantry battalion
  - Labor troops, signal communication unit, transport team, field hospital, veterinary hospital.
- 88th Independent Mixed Brigade - Major-General Kaitō Kiyoshi
  - 519th Independent Infantry Battalion
  - 520th Independent Infantry Battalion
  - 521st Independent Infantry Battalion
  - 522nd Independent Infantry Battalion
  - 523rd Independent Infantry Battalion,
  - artillery troops
  - labor troops team

== China ==
=== Army ===
National Military Council

- 2nd Front Army - Zhang Fakui
  - 46th Army - Li Hsing-su
    - 583rd Regiment of the 188th Division
    - 175th Division
  - 64th Army - Chang Shih
    - 156th Division
    - 159th Division
- 3rd Front Army - Tang En-po
  - 27th Group Army - Lu Yu-tang
    - 20th Army - Yang Kan-tsai
      - 133rd Division
      - 134th Division
    - 26th Army - Ting Chih-pan
      - 41st Division
      - 44th Division
  - 94th Army - Mu Ting-fang
    - 5th Division - Li Tse-fen
    - 43rd Division - Li Shih-lin
    - 121st Division - Ch Ching-min
  - 29th Army - Chen Ta-ching
    - 169th Division
    - 91st Division
    - 11th Reserve Division

== Sources ==
- Hsu Long-hsuen and Chang Ming-kai, History of The Sino-Japanese War (1937-1945) 2nd Ed., 1971. Translated by Wen Ha-hsiung, Chung Wu Publishing; 33, 140th Lane, Tung-hwa Street, Taipei, Taiwan Republic of China.
