= Battle of Dushan =

Battle of World War II and the Second Sino-Japanese War

Battle of Southern Guizhou
- Part of the Second Sino-Japanese War of World War II
Date	November – December 1944 (1 month)
Location	Dushan County, Duyun county, Danzhai county, Libo County and Sandu Shui Autonomous County in southern Guizhou province and Nandan County in Guangxi province in the Republic of China
Result	Chinese victory

Belligerents
China	Japan

Commanders and leaders
(Republic of China (1912–1949)) Sun Yuanliang (Republic of China (1912–1949)) Yang Sen (Republic of China (1912–1949)) Ding Zhipan	(Empire of Japan) Lieutenant General Yamamoto Mitsuo; Yamamoto Sano; Colonel Ninogami Riki

Strength
900 regular soldiers of the 91st Division of the 29th Army at Dushan only 20th and 26th armies in Libo; Musket armed militas from ethnic minorities in all counties	13th Division's 104th, 34th Regiments, 3rd Division's 6th Regiment (10,000 soldiers) at Dushan county 11th Army's 3rd Division 24th Regiment (3,000 soldiers) at Libo county unknown in other counties

Casualties and losses
	Unknown in Dushan, Over 100 Japanese killed by Sui musket militiamen in other counties

Japanese officers in Guangxi were told to try to capture Guiyang city in Guizhou once the Battle of Guilin–Liuzhou was completed. Chinese forces repulsed the Japanese attack and recaptured the cities and villages in Dushan, Libo, Sandu counties in southern Guizhou and Nandan county in northwest Guangxi, preventing Japan from capturing Guiyang.

Sichuan warlord Yang Sen helped guard Guiyang while Sichuan general Sun Yuanliang fought the Japanese at Dushan.

Battle of Dushan (Battle of Tushan) (獨山戰役) was part of the Battle of South Guizhou (黔南事变).

Qiannan (South Guizhou) can refer strictly to the administrative prefecture Qiannan Buyei and Miao Autonomous Prefecture or to all of south Guizhou in general.

== Battle ==
Shenhe bridge was defended by the 29th army, the same army at Lugou bridge (Marco Polo bridge) in 1937. Single shot needle guns, birds guns (musket shotguns), spears and sabres were used by Han, Bouyei and Sui villagers to attack the Japanese army in southern Guizhou.

Chinese troops and U.S. Army Major Frank A. Gleason blew up Shenhe bridge in south Guizhou to stop Japanese vehicles from crossing.

Ethnic minority Sui militias armed with just swords and smoothbore muzzle loading matchlock musket shotguns killed Japanese soldiers. In one battle, the Shui only lost 4 dead while they captured Japanese amunition, helmets, gas masks, horses, horse bells, bayonet and killed 8 Japanese in Shiban village of Sandu Shui Autonomous County. Over a hundred Japanese were killed by ethnic minority militias like the Sui.

Huangping County was home to the military Jiuzhou airport which was under construction during the war and the Japanese were never able to reach Huangping in east Guizhou due to their failure in southern Guizhou. The Japanese invaded southern Guizhou via three points, going to Sandong on 28 November through Jiuqian in Sandu county via Libo county's Jiarong township on 27 November from Minglun county and Huanjiang, another going to Danzhai county via Sandu and Libo counties from the Qian-Gui railway in Huanjiang, and another in Dushan on 2 December. They attacked Liuzhai after Nandan in Guangxi along the QianGui railway linking Guiliin and Guizhou. Local ethnic mnorities with home made muzzle loading smoothbore cannons, muskets and broadswords ambushed the Japanese in Niuchang, Sandu county and in Shuiang Longchang, Banli, Bannan, Gutan villages as well as Sandu county ad Jiuqian's Shiban village. Sui farmer militias used their muskets and village walls to fight the Japanese all across Dushan, Sandu and Libo. Construction on Jiuzhou resumed in December since it never fell to the Japanese. Laobuchang, Zunyi (Longping) and Qingzhen airfields and roads were constructed with help of Gelao people.

The Anti-Enemy Self-Defence Corps (抗敌自卫团) militias were formed by ethnic minorities Sui and Bouyei people under direction of Dushan county magistrate Kong Fuming. Deputy commanders included Luo Shibin and Mawei Bouyei Mo Fenglou. They used swords, spears, home made muzzle loading small cannons and homemade muskets to kill Japanese. Ethnic minorities attacked the Japanese with all kinds of weapons. In Langgannuodong 3 Japanese were attacked by Lu Kunshan, a Japanese soldier had his rifle taken at Sanwangmiao by Wang Shiyou, Japanese were kiled at Lijia Village by Li Yunchen, a Japanese soldier was hacked to death with an axe in Shangsitunjiao by Lu Yongzhang, Japanese were killed in Dayang Township by Cen Qilong and a Japanese shot dead in Naluo, Mawei by He Baozhang.

200 Sui civilians were killed.

Ethnic minority militias like the Bouyei and Shui seized 17 horses and mules, over 180 Type 38 Arisaka rifles, 2 machine guns and 1 artillery piece while using just broadswords, home made muzzle loading cannons and homemade muskets to kill Japanese who had heavy artillery and.. 8 Japanese were killed by Sui people in Shibanzhai.

At Chuangdong the Japanese were defeated by 27th Army Group commander Ding Zhipan and 1,000 regular troops in addition to broadsword and matchlock musket armed Shui militia in mountain caves. 300 Japanese were killed after 2 days and nights of fighting in a failed attack on a Chinese line at Mengjia'ao, Liuquanao and Tanjiao under General Yang Sen and parts of the 26th army, 20th army587th regiment. on 27 November.More than 200 Japanese were killed in 3 days and 2 nights of fighting by the 587th regiment earlier at Liming pass.

Pan Laofa led Shui people at Shibanzhai to fight the Japanese and at Shilichangpo both Shui and Bouyi ambushed Japanese in Congshan township on 28 November. Dozens of Japanese soldiers wre killed in a booby trapped cave with explosives near Lizhouzhai on 3 December at 5:00 PM.

The Japanese withdrew from southern Guizhou after Shenhe bridge was destroyed and they could no longer advance.
