= Dongwuling Ambush (1938) =

Ambush during the 2nd Sino-Japanese War

- Part of the Second Sino-Japanese War and the interwar period
Date	August 1–2, 1938 (1 day)
Location	Dongwuling between Yicheng and Qinshui in south Shanxi province, Republic of China
Result	Chinese victory

Belligerents
(Republic of China (1912–1949)) National Revolutionary Army, China	(Empire of Japan) Japanese North China Area Army, Imperial Japanese Army, Japan

Commanders and leaders
(Republic of China (1912–1949)) Wei Lihuang (Republic of China (1912–1949)) Li Mo'an	(Empire of Japan) Major Sogō

Units involved
10th Division and certain units of the 3rd Column of the Shanxi Youth Anti-Japanese Dare-to-Die Corps and 83rd Division	Certain units of the 105th Infantry Regiment and 108th Artillery Regiment of the 108th Division of the First Army and various motorized supply and other non-combat units.

Strength
Japanese Claim : Approximately 9,000; Approximately 20,000	?

Casualties and losses
Chinese Claim : 10th Division (July 29 to August 2) : 1,000+ casualties Japanese Claim : approximately 1,000 killed and 2,000 wounded	Japanese Claim : According to the 'Diary of the China Incident' : Motorized units : 185 killed, 108 wounded, 91 missing; Sogō unit of the 108th Division : 45 killed, 109 wounded; Chinese Claim : 10th Division's claim (July 29 to August 2) : 1,500+ killed and 40+ captured

The Dongwuling Ambush was a large-scale ambush conducted by National Revolutionary Army against a Imperial Japanese Army convoy in the mountainous region of south Shanxi. It was part of the Battle in the South Shanxi Triangle Area and Along the Yellow River. The Japanese Army referred to the battle as the Battle near Guzhen in Shanxi Province, Battle near Linggou, and Battle near Dongwuling.

== Background ==
Following the capture of Jinan by the Imperial Japanese Second Army in late December 1937, the Japanese North China Area Army ordered the First Army to pacify the areas at the left bank of the Yellow River. From mid-February to early March 1938, the 20th Division, 108th Division, and 109th Division launched a massive attack at south Shanxi, occupying Wenshui, Fenyang, Changzhi, Jincheng, Linfen, and Yuncheng in rapid succession. The Nationalists retreated to the mountainous areas of Shanxi and joined forces with the Communist troops already entrenched there. From mid-March to late April, the First Army launched suppression campaigns in the occupied areas, but failed to achieve the objective of driving out either the Nationalists or Communists, who continued conducting guerilla warfare.

In mid-April 1938, the 14th Division and the 16th Division were transferred from the First Army to participate in the battle of Xuzhou. As a result, the First Army had to adjust its garrisons due to insufficient troops. At the same time, the Military Commission of the Kuomintang ordered Wei Lihuang, deputy commander-in-chief of the Second War Zone, to lead the troops in south Shanxi in a full-scale attack to drive the enemy out of the south Shanxi triangle area in support of the battle of Xuzhou. Yan Xishan was ordered to lead the troops in north Shanxi and west Suiyuan to cut off railway lines and hinder the enemy's transportation of supply. On May 16, Wei Lihuang ordered the various troops of his South Route Army to attack all at once, with the main target being the capture of Quwo and Houma. The Japanese 20th Division in south Shanxi was caught in a struggle with a superior foe. As a result of frequent attacks at the Tongpu railway line, supplies were insufficient and the 20th Division was forced to give up Puzhou (蒲州) and Pinglu while holding onto Hejin, Wenxi, Xinjiang, Quwo, and Houma. The two sides engaged in fierce fighting for two months and the commander of the First Army tried his best to increase troop strength and replenish ammunition. During this period, the 14th Division was transferred back to the First Army.

As the siege of Quwo and Houma continued, the Japanese 108th Division and 4th Independent Mixed Brigade advanced towards south Shanxi in late June, reaching the east of Yuanqu by July 1 and engaging with the 17th Division, 83rd Division, 85th Division, and 5th Separate Brigade. The 20th Division also launched its offensive on July 5. Due to heavy casualties incurred in two months of combat, the South Route Army was forced to retreat. Qinshui fell on July 7, and most of Yicheng soon followed. The two sides continued fighting in south Shanxi until the end of July.

Due to the need for resupply, the 3rd Motorized Supply Unit received the order to transport supplies between Yicheng and Qinshui starting from July 11, with the 81st and 83rd Motor Transport Companies of the 5th Motorized Supply Unit put under its command. On July 29, the Qinshui Branch followed orders to move from Qinshui towards Quwo.

The Japanese column was composed of portions of a large number of units. The units providing cover consisted of the 1st Battalion of the 105th Infantry Regiment, the 1st Company of the 108th Artillery Regiment, a machine gun platoon, an artillery platoon, half of an infantry support gun company, a light mortar platoon, the baggage unit of the 3rd Battalion, and half of the 4th Field Hospital, all under the command of Major Sogō. Units under escort included portions of the 3rd and 5th Motorized Supply Units, one transport observation unit each from the 9th and 12th Divisions, one river transport unit from the 2nd Division, one land transport unit from the 9th Division, one mobile repair squad each from the 1st, 2nd, and 3rd Field Motor Transport Units, the 3rd Field Construction Unit, and portions of the Engineer Reserve Unit of the 9th Division, 2nd Separate Engineer Regiment, 32nd Field Telecommunication Company, and 9th Separate Machine Gun Battalion. The convoy was split into two echelons. The second echelon included the 33rd and 36th Motor Transport Companies of the 3rd Motorized Supply Unit and the 81st and 83rd Motor Transport Companies of the 5th Motorized Supply Unit. The first echelon included the 35th, 38th, and 39th Motor Transport Companies of the 3rd Motorized Supply Unit.

== Battle ==
=== Japanese Accounts of Events ===
At 7 a.m. on July 29, the second echelon of the Japanese column set out on their journey from Qinshui to Quwo under the escort of Sogō's battalion. Throughout the journey they were harassed by small units of Chinese troops before ultimately reaching Guzhen (固鎮) by 8.30 p.m. of July 30. However, due to the continuous rainfall that had gone on for several days, the Mei River flooded the route of the echelon. As a result, they had to devote time to repairing the roads for the whole of July 31. In the early morning of August 1, the echelon departed from Guzhen. As they continued their advance, the convoy was suddenly bombarded by enemy mortar shells, which were fired with such precision that multiple hits were scored and the leading vehicles were set ablaze. With their advance hindered, the echelon decided to use the cover of night to breakthrough the enemy's blockade at Dongwuling.

At 10 p.m., Sogō's battalion began its operation with the echelon following close behind. At 00.30 a.m. on August 2, they set off from the western side of Xihe Village. Approximately 100 meters west of Xihe Village, they were suddenly subjected to the enemy's heavy machine gun fire from the southern hillside. Enemy light and heavy weapons poured fire down from both sides of the high grounds as the echelon continued their advance under the cover of darkness, slowing down their progress. At 5.30 a.m., the advance unit of the echelon reached the southern foot of the eastern high ground of Dongwuling. It was at this time that the echelon's commander received a report that the artillerymen and the horses pulling the vehicles at the front had suffered very heavy losses. In response, he decided to order the self-defense troops of the motor transport companies to move towards the front where he would personally command them to occupy the eastern side of Dongwuling and repel the enemy. All motor transport companies were ordered to push their vehicles forward as much as they could.

The troops of the various motor transport companies rushed to the foot of the eastern high ground towards their commander and engaged in fierce fighting with the enemy. The self-defense troops of the 81st Motor Transport Company (consisting of 20 troops) commanded by sergeant Shimuzu occupied the high ground north of Dongwuling and resisted the enemy with Chinese weapons captured in a previous operation. Mortar shells rained down on the advancing Japanese vehicles, setting multiple trucks on fire with the 33rd Motor Transport Company in particular being badly hit. By noon, the various units of the second echelon were unable to fight effectively after losing contact with their superior commander.

The first echelon, which were following behind the second echelon and had also taken fire on the way, reached Dongwuling by the early morning of August 2. The echelon commander ordered his troops to disembark from their vehicles and occupied small hills along the route. With the arrival of the first echelon, second echelon commander Yamashita gathered his troops and assembled at Shangwu Village on 2.30 p.m. By 4.00 p.m., the first echelon had gathered the dead and wounded and advanced towards the second echelon's assembly point. Together, the two echelons moved towards Yicheng on August 4 and arrived at Quwo on August 5.

=== Chinese Accounts of Events ===
Upon detecting the advance of the 108th Division on July 29, the 10th and 85th Divisions set up an ambush in an area between Yicheng and Qinshui. The 10th Division encircled more than 1,000 troops from the 105th Infantry Regiment of the 108th Division attached with motorized and transport units from the night of August 1 to the morning of August 2. Excluding a portion of the enemy and more than 20 vehicles which broke out from the west side of Dongwuling, the rest were wiped out. The divisional commander claimed to have captured more than 20 enemy troops and destroyed more than 90 vehicles with more than 400 bodies abandoned on the battlefield though they were still engaging with the remnants of the enemy by the evening of August 2. Li's brigade of the 83rd Division blocked the enemy fleeing westward who then retreated to the vicinity of Dongwuling.

At the morning of August 2, enemy reinforcements from Qinshui arrived and engaged with Li's brigade of the 83rd Division (which consisted of only four infantry companies). In response, Liu Kan, commander of the 93rd Army, requested Mei's regiment (consisting of only one infantry company and one machine gun company) to rush to their aid. Fighting lasted until night with both sides suffering casualties. The enemy fought in fierce battles with the 83rd Division at Xiaoyao and Shangwu Village on August 3 before retreating to Yicheng at night. In this battle, the 83rd Division claimed to have captured 2 Japanese troops and more than 10 vehicles while suffering more than 10 casualties.

The history of the 3rd Dare-to-Die Column of the Shanxi New Army recorded that a portion of the 7th Regiment of the 3rd Column coordinated with Kuomintang troops under Li Mo'an to ambush more than 300 enemy troops of a transport battalion and more than 100 trucks advancing from Yangcheng to Qinshui on both sides of the Dongwuling-Qugao Highway between Yicheng and Qinshui. Once the enemy entered their ambush area, the Chinese troops opened fire and destroyed the leading trucks, blocking the route. In the firefight that followed, the column claimed that the entire Japanese unit was wiped out with more than 30 captured, of which the 7th Regiment was responsible for killing or wounding more than 10 enemy troops and capturing 4.

== Aftermath ==
After the battle, the 108th Division sent out a task force to clean up the battlefield and search for the dead and missing. The task force conducted a thorough search around the Linggou area and collected the remains of the killed and vehicle parts. Of the bodies recovered, 191 could be identified by affiliation and 64 remained unknown. In addition, approximately 70 troops were believed to have been captured by the enemy. After returning to Linfen, the task force confirmed the recovery of the remains of all 157 troops reported as killed in action. Furthermore, of the 142 troops whose status were previously unknown, 92 were confirmed to have been killed in action while 50 still remained missing.

In this battle, the Chinese Army claimed that, excluding two to three hundred Japanese troops who broke out from the west towards Yicheng on August 2, the remaining encircled troops were wiped out by the 10th Division and more than 300 vehicles were destroyed. On August 12, 1938, Wei Lihuang reported the spoils of war captured by Peng Jieru's 10th Division in the Wangzhaizhen, Guzhen, and Dongwuling areas in five days and nights of fighting as 248 rifles, 24 light machine guns, 4 heavy machine guns, 7 mortars, 2 revolvers, 2 swords, 66 bayonets, 24 helmets, 79 gas masks, and various other military supplies. 289 trucks, 4 armored vehicles, and 7 small passenger cars were also captured, but due to the rugged mountain roads, the vehicles could not be transported and were instead disassembled for parts while the rest were destroyed. From late August to the start of September, the Second Bureau of the National Revolutionary Army's General Staff conducted interrogations for some of the forty to fifty prisoners taken in this ambush, many of whom were stragglers captured after the battle. Through these investigations the Chinese Army was able to ascertain the structure and organization of the motor transport companies involved in the battle and the Japanese units in south Shanxi.

The 81st Motor Transport Company of the 5th Motorized Supply Unit suffered 6 wounded and 1 missing of its 48 troops. The company lost 3 rifles, 8 bayonets, 1 sword, 5 captured automatic pistols, 1 captured light machine gun, and 16 trucks. The 4th Field Hospital of the 108th Division suffered 1 killed, 7 wounded, and 1 missing. 10 horses were killed and 5 horses were injured. 6 supply trucks and 1 rifle were lost. According to the detailed report of the 4th Field Hospital, the total number of patients admitted to the field hospital during the battle could not be determined as the patient log was destroyed by mortar fire in the morning of August 2 at Dongwuling. However, since the convoy's departure from Qinshui, it was believed that at least 500 patients had been admitted to the field hospital. When the 4th Field Hospital of the 108th Division handed over the remaining patients to the 3rd Field Hospital of the 20th Division at Quwo, there were still 355 men, including 272 wounded, 5 with infectious diseases, and 78 with non-infectious diseases. Of the 272 wounded, 122 were from the 105th Infantry Regiment which provided cover for the convoy, 4 were from the 108th Artillery Regiment, 99 were from the 3rd Motorized Supply Unit, 1 was from the 5th Motorized Supply Unit, 4 were personnel of the field hospital, and the remaining 42 were from other units that participated in the battle.
