= Hsinchu air raid =

1943 airstrike on a base in Hsinchu, Taiwan

- Part of Pacific War
Date	25 November 1943
Location	Hsinchu, Taiwan
Result	Allied victory

Belligerents
Empire of Japan	United States; Republic of China

The Hsinchu air raid (新竹空襲) was an aerial attack carried out on November 25, 1943, during the Pacific War, by a joint force of the United States Army Air Forces and the National Revolutionary Army against a Japanese military base in Hsinchu, Taiwan, which was then under Japanese rule. The surprise attack by the Allied forces was successful, and the Japanese military lost a large number of aircraft.
