= Attack on the Kaifeng Yellow River Railway Bridge =

1945 ROC–Japan battle

Yellow river bridge attack
- Part of the Second Sino-Japanese War of World War II
Date	9 August 1945
Location	Kaifeng, Yellow River in Henan, China
Result	See veracity of the claims

Belligerents
(Republic of China (1912–1949)) China	(Empire of Japan) Japan

Commanders and leaders
(Republic of China (1912–1949)) Major Tien (United States) Paul Cyr	(Empire of Japan)

Strength
17 Chinese guerillas 6 OSS (Team "Jackal")	Allied claims: 9,700 Japanese soldiers guarding the bridge, 1,800-2,000 Japanese soldiers in the train crash Wu Binglin's claim: 1,200 Japanese troops in the train crash

Casualties and losses
zero casualties	Allied claims: OSS claim: 1,800-2,000 dead Wu Binglin's claim: 1,200 dead

The attack on the Kaifeng Yellow River Railway Bridge took place on 9 August 1945 during the latter stage of the Second Sino-Japanese War of World War II. American OSS team supported by Chinese guerrillas in China mined a Japanese built double-track bridge over the Yellow River near Kaifeng. It was claimed that a Japanese train struck the mines, destroying the train and sections of the bridge. The Allies claimed that between 1,200 and 2,000 Japanese soldiers were killed.

== Background ==
In China, US special operations (SO) teams used guerrilla tactics to disrupt Japanese forces by attacking supply lines, communications, and transportation. A key target was the long double-track bridge over the Yellow River near Kaifeng, which linked Japanese forces operating in northern and southern China. Colonel Frank Mills chose 24-year-old Major Paul Cyr as leader of a six-man group to help destroy the Yellow river railroad bridge.

The Japanese had built this new concrete and steel bridge and a new railroad which helped link Hankow to Beijing on a north-south axis. Japan transported soldiers and supplies between Southeast Asia, south China and Manchuria via this bridge. Aerial bombardment was unable to do permanent damage to the bridge when the 14th Air Force attacked it. Mills said "I decided to put the first OSS team into this area to knock out the bridge for a longer period of time. It was a high priority target and we were competing in a sense with the 311th Fighter/Bomber Group to see who could get there first and do a good job of blowing the bridge up." Chinese interpreter Boris Chu, Navy Specialist Photographer Jerry Welo, Jedburgh Team Gerald radio operator Sergeant Berent E. Friele, Lieutenant Albert Robinchaud and Major Cyr were the members of Team Jackal parachuted in for the mission.

The men were parachuted into the area on 22 May 1945 after their plane flew east from Xi'an (Hsian) for 500 miles. Welo broke his ankle but survived and they met up around rural Changti at a camp with local Chinese guerillas. A Chinese double agent, who secretly was with the Chinese government but pretended to collaborate with Japan as a puppet general, was based in Xinxiang where 10,000 Japanese were located. This general met Cyr in Xinxiang after Cyr was smuggled in a horse cart. A week plater another parachute drop was made including more weapons, ammunition for Chinese guerillas, another translator, another photographer and Captain Edward B. Zarembo as part of a second four-man OSS group. The Chinese double agent general sent hundreds of Chinese officers and soldiers to train with the new rifles and carbines under Lieutenant Robichaud. The railroad lines were severed at hundreds of points by the Chinese guerillas after training was completed. On 24 July, 17 Chinese guerillas including Major Tien worked with OSS Team Jackal agents Chu, Friele, Zarembo and Major Paul Cyr planned an attack near Kaifeng against a double-track bridge on the Yellow river. At a point 20 miles upstream to the bridge they camped out. The Japanese stationed antiaircraft guns, heavy machine guns, and 200 soldiers in an island in the middle of the river, 1,500 soldiers north of the bridge and 8,000 soldiers south of the bridge. Escape routes were plotted out after the bridge was surveyed by the Chinese and Americans, they planned to operate at night and approach the bridge on a wooden boat. The Chinese were familiar with the Japanese patrol schedule.

Cyr said, "I trained thirty-five men for rails and twenty-five for bridges, We made 1,000 rails charges of TNT and made many more with Chinese guncotton, with old wicks for fuses, when we ran out of our own material."

== Previous attacks on the bridge by OSS affiliated Chinese guerillas and air force ==
OSS China head Col. Richard D. Heppner Jr. said on 24 September 1945 that Japan lost 12,000 casualties to Chinese guerillas linked to OSS in occupied regions of China. Around 100-300 Chinese guerillas per unit were connected to a typically 5 man OSS unit of Americans. There were only 2,000 American OSS personnel in China, including non-combatants who didn't engage in the front lines. They destroyed 40 Japanese warehouses, 200 trucks, 30 locomotives, 50 bridges and attacked 5,000 points on railways. In the final 4 months of the war in 1945, the kill rate per some individual guerillas was 700 Japanese for each unit. The OSS guerilla attack on the Yellow river railway bridge killing Japanese soldiers on board the train on 9 August was also mentioned. 5,447 Japanese were verified to have been killed by Kachins and OSS Burma agents, with an estimated 10,000 more Japanese also killed and 64 Japanese POWs, the OSS casualties were 70 Kachins and 15 Americans.

75 miles to the north of Luoyang the Japanese controlled Chiao Tzoa mines ran on a steam turbine power plant, which was destroyed by Chinese guerillas in late 1943 and reported by the OSS. OSS agent Frank Gleason also reported an earlier different successful raid on a railway bridge between Xinxiang and Kaifeng on the Yellow river by 300 Chinese guerillas on January 1944, saying it "was a definite indication that the Chinese could operate successfully, if the word would be given from Chungking." This was different from the 9 August 1945 main raid on the Yellow river railway bridge by Chinese guerillas with Team Jackal and Paul Cyr. Cyr's attack on the Yellow river railway bridge was done on 9 August 1945.

The railway bridge around Zhengzhou on the Yellow river already existed earlier and was destroyed by Chinese in 1938, but was repaired by Japan in early 1944. Chinese news also mentioned a successful Chinese bombing of the Yellow river railway bridge around Zhengzhou on 3 August 1944 after it was repaired by Japan.

The Yellow river railway bridge was blown up by Chinese in 1938. Repair work on the bridge was started by Japanese in December 1943. The American 14th Air Force and Chinese-American Composite Wing successfully struck the entire Beijing-Hankou rail itself along Xinzheng, Xinyang and Kaifeng and the Beijing-Hankou Yellow river bridge from April-December 1944 causing significant disruption and material damage to Japanese forces.

Japanese military admitted the Yellow river Bawangcheng bridge was wrecked by 26 B-24s on 29 April 1944 despite 10 Japanese Type 2 fighters of the 9th Air Regiment trying to protect the bridge in Xinxiang.

On 28 December 1944 American army magazine CBI roundup said that 14 locomotives along with the Ping-Han Yellow river railway bridge were wrecked by the US 14th Air Force, saying 4 of its spans were blown out.

The US 14th Air Force wrecked 37 bridges and 142 locomotives while bombing the Jingpu (Tsingpu) rail and the Ping-Han rail bridge with Mustangs on January 1945. Railyards and a rail bridge on the Yellow river in Shandong near Jinan (Tsinan) was also wrecked by 14th Air Force and it could carry 3,000 tons of supplies on 23 March 1945.

== Attack ==
The attack was launched during 9 August, a windy and rainy day and they were able to climb up the bridge columns since their noise was masked by the wind and rain. The bridge's piers each had 6 concrete filled steel columns, and each Chinese had 72 pounds of explosives they attached to them. They had waterproof fuses which burned for 25 minutes and were 50 feet long and installed them on the explosives. Major Tien lit every fuse after he told his men to swim back to land. A 20-car-long train carrying Japanese soldiers crossed the bridge 30 minutes later and the first explosives detonated when the locomotive nearly reached the other end. Six cars along with the locomotive were dragged down with the part of the bridge that was blown up. The rest of the explosives detonated carrying the bridge and other cars along with them into the river when the Japanese attempted to leave the cars with all 2,000 Japanese soldiers in the cars tossed into the river. The Chinese guerillas all evacuated the scene successfully while the Japanese soldiers guarding the bridge were in a panic.

The bridge was three miles long. Cyr said, "Soon after dark on August ninth our river men crawled down through the grass to their hidden boats and loaded the demolition charges aboard, with 100-foot fuses which would burn, even under water, for twenty-five minutes, Agile as monkeys, the saboteurs swarmed up the bridge supports, passing seventy-two packets of explosives from one to another quickly and noiselessly."

Cyr said: "We didn't have an electric detonator for exact timing but we got the train just the same. It puffed onto the bridge just as we reached the bank. The locomotive was almost across when all hell broke loose. Six cars crumbled and the locomotive slid back into the hole where the inshore pier had been. The other cars were stopped right over another mined pier, in perfect position. Jap soldiers were everywhere, nineteen carloads of them. As they screamed and scolded and asked questions about the delay, the second charge went off, then another and another. The rest of the train, the soldiers, and that whole section of bridge vanished into the swirling river."

The Japanese used the bridge to cross between south and north China and the bridge was double-track. All 2,000 Japanese on the train were sent to the riverbed.

== Aftermath ==
The operation as one of the notable achievements of SO Detachment 202 in the China theater.

Cyr said "These seventeen picked men I had were river thieves, as tough a breed as I ever hope to see." Cyr referred to the bridge as the "hottest target in China". Cyr wrote this account of the mission in "We Blew up the Yellow River Bridge" on 23 March 1946 in "The Saturday Evening Post".

Paul Cyr gave a speech about his work on 6 April 1946 at that Phil Smidt's Hammond, Indiana for the Calumet Transportation Association. He gave a speech titled "Adventures of an American Spy" on 5 January 1947 at Club Day at the Contemporary Club, White Plains, N.Y.

The atomic bomb was dropped on Nagasaki on the same day the bridge was blown up.

The Bronze star was awarded to Paul Cyr for his work in the operation.

In 1950 Cyr attempted to run in Indiana for a Congress seat. Cyr's sons and wife live in South Carolina.

The attack is documented in the book "OSS Special Operations in China".

== Wu Binglin's account ==
The sole living Chinese member of the operation to give interviews about the operation was Wu Binglin.

Four Chinese including translator Wu Binglin (吳炳琳) accompanied the six Americans of Team Jackal. Wu Binglin was part of the second the parachute jump into Henan which reinforced the six initial members of Team Jackal in the first jump. Wu named the three other members of his group in the second jump as fellow Chinese Yao Nianming (姚念明) and the Americans Aiken 艾克和 and Jackson (傑克遜). They were dropped with 4.2 inch rifled mortar, small pocket cameras, handheld radios, ground to air radios, transceivers, hand cranked generators, grenades, flamethrowers, bazookas, explosives, ammunition, automatic guns and anti-Japanese pamphlets, and greeted by Captain Tian Hanbang (田漢邦) on the ground. Friele, Zarembo, Major Cyr and two Chinese, Tian Shuxin (田樹新), Zhu Baosen (朱葆森). came to green the new group of 4 Americans and Chinese. Wu gave Friele's name as (福瑞利) Zarembo's name as (索倫布) and Major Cyr's name as 謝爾少校 in Chinese.

They met local Chinese guerillas, with Wang Sanzhu (王三祝) commanding several thousand and Wang Guoran (王國然) commanding over 10,000 while they left south on foot and in carts to Weiqiu from Datun (大囤) village in Qi county (淇縣). They learned that the puppet troops of the He Lanting (賀蘭亭) Detachment, 24th Army group commander Pang Bingxun (龐炳勛) and New 5th Army commander Sun Dianying(孫殿英) agreed to backstab the Japanese and cut the rear of the Japanese when Chinese forces launch a counteroffensive in Henan.

Sun Dianying's base was in Xinxiang and Aiken and Yao Nianming were sent with communication equipment to join Sun's forces and they also gave weapons to two companies, one under Wang Guoran and another under He Lanting.

They distributed anti-Japanese pamphlets and trained local guerillas in using new weapons, sabotage and ambush. After discussing bridge attack plans with Paul Cyr, they agreed that four snipers would be led by Wu Binglin to cover Tian Shuxin and Zhu Baosen who would lead three other soldiers to rig the explosives on the bridge.

Handheld radios were given to Wu, Tian Shuxin and Zhu Baosen while Tian Shuxin also had a matchbox-sized camera and Zhu had a ground to air radio. They travelled in a horse-drawn cart with rubber wheels with their explosives and weapons.

A Northrop P-61 Black Widow was sent to fly around the bridge from Xi'an to distract the Japanese who were watching it while the cloudy weather and sound of water masked their sounds while Tian and Zhu's team attached explosives.

Tian and Zhu's team ordered Wu's signaled to Wu's team to retreat after they lit the fuses and they hid 200 meters from the bridge in a ditch, the first explosion occurred at 11:17 PM. They then heard the Japanese train arrive and further explosions and Tian Shuxin took pictures of the scene before leaving, and the Academia Historica in Taiwan currently holds those pictures.

Sun Dianying discovered that the Japanese killed on the train on the bridge belonged to the "Iida division" (飯田師團) and sent Major General Li Guo'an (李國安), his chief Aide-De-Camp to report it to Team Jackal.

Tian Shuxin and Tian Hanbang returned to the First War Zone Command headquarters after Group Jackal returned to Xi'an. Wu Binglin went to Kunming along with a young man surnamed Wang (王), Dai Weili (戴維立) and Zhu Baosen.

Wu Binglin (吳炳琳) said that other Chinese members of the group included Tian Shuxin (田樹新), Zhu Baosen (朱葆森). Wu recalled that Tian, Zhu and others lit the fuses after they all placed the explosives and Wu acted as a sniper, guarding their position. Wu was born in 1925 and was 20 years old during the mission.

== Veracity of the claims ==
A Chinese volunteer stated that all Allied attacks of the Yellow River Iron Bridge during the war were done by the US air force. Reporter Jiang Guijia believed that Wu Binglin's claim must be rigorously verified if he did participate in an attack on the bridge. The Zhengzhou City, Henan Yellow River, and Kaifeng City Chronicles did not record the attack or the destruction of a section of the Yellow River Iron Bridge. After the Japanese Army occupied Zhengzhou during Operation Ichi-Go, they constructed the Zhengzhou-Kaifeng section of the railway and a bridge over the Yellow River that at maximum could be used by light locomotives or railcars. Despite a low amount of traffic, the bridge continued to be in use and was taken over by the Nationalist Government after Japan's surrender and demolished by the Zhengzhou Railway Administration in April 1946. Wu Yan, a Communist Party member and at the time a close confidant to General Gao Shuxun, recalled that right after the end of the war the iron bridge spanning over the Yellow River was still under the control of the Japanese Army and he, as someone who could speak Japanese, was responsible with coordinating the crossing of Gao Shuxun's New Eighth Army with the Japanese guards as they made their way north to Xinxiang. The Academia Historica of Taiwan did not record this action at the Yellow River Iron Bridge.

The 110th Division in charge of the defenses did not record this attack nor the claimed destruction of a part of the Yellow River Iron Bridge. They were also not mentioned in Senshi Sosho. Instead, what was recorded on August 9 was the Soviet Invasion of Manchuria followed on the same day by a public call by Mao Zedong for a nationwide resistance to coordinate with the Soviets. From the start of the large-scale Chinese Communist counterattack until the end of November 1945, approximately 2,900 Japanese soldiers in the North China Area Army were killed or wounded.

OSS veteran Francis Byron Mills who was in China, in 2002 published "The OSS Secret Wars in China" and confirmed that a train filled with Japanese soldiers along with the Yellow river rail bridge (2 spans) were destroyed and the Beijing-Hankou railway in just one night was cut in 1,756 different places by Chinese guerillas.

The CIA museum has the compass of the OSS Detachment 202 leader who was the commanding officer of the teams that wrecked the Beijing-Hankou railway and directed the successful attack on the Yellow river Bridge with 2 of its spans blown out. The compass belonged to Lt. Col. Gustav J. Krause.

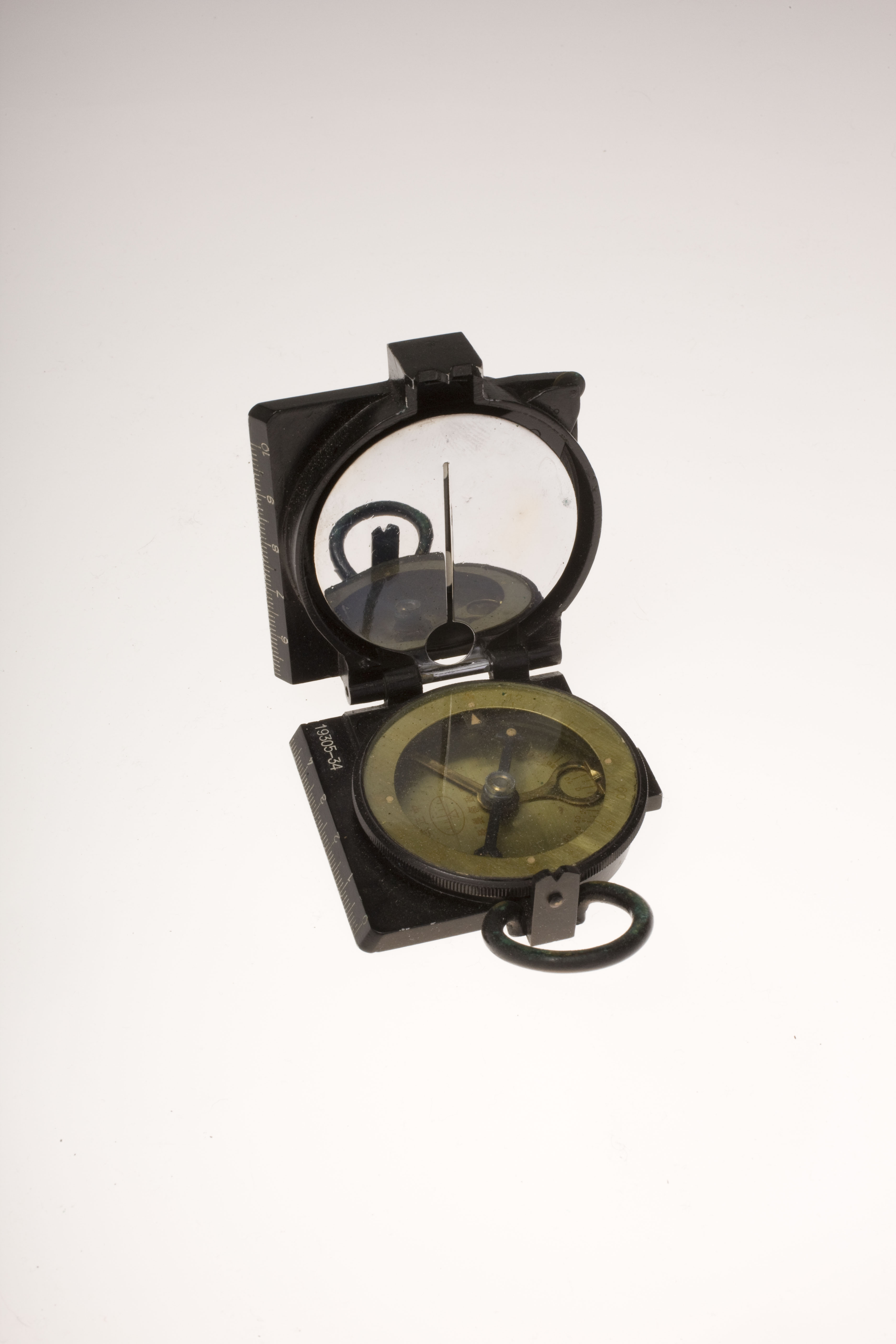
Lt. Col. Gustav J. Krause's compass

In an interview on 21 March, 2005, OSS veteran John W. Brunner affirmed the number of over 12,000 Japanese killed in OSS Detachment 202 connected guerilla operations in China, he served in China during the war. OSS Detachment 202 included Japanese American translator Roy Matsumoto.
