= Yukio Kasahara =

Imperial Japanese Army lieutenant general (1889–1988)

- 笠原 幸雄
- Born: 6 November 1889; Sendai, Miyagi, Japan
- Died: 2 January 1988 (aged 98)
- Education: Imperial Japanese Army Academy; Army Staff College
- Military career
- Allegiance: Empire of Japan
- Branch: Imperial Japanese Army
- Service years: 1913–1945
- Rank: Lieutenant general
- Units: Imperial Japanese Army General Staff Office, Kwantung Army, Northern China Area Army
- Commands: Imperial Guards Cavalry Regiment, IJA 12th Division, IJA 11th Army
- Conflicts: Second Sino-Japanese War; Operation Ichi-Go; Battle of Guilin-Liuzhou
- Other work: Military attaché, instructor

Yukio Kasahara (笠原 幸雄, Kasahara Yukio; 6 November 1889 – 2 January 1988) was a lieutenant general in the Imperial Japanese Army during the Second Sino-Japanese War.

== Biography ==
Kasahara was born into a military family in Sendai, attending the First Tokyo Middle School in his youth. He graduated from the 22nd class of the Imperial Japanese Army Academy in 1913, and from the 22nd class of the Army Staff College in November 1918.

Kasahara was sent as a military attaché to Moscow, Russia from 1929 to 1932, and became fluent in the Russian language. On 4 March 1931, a telegram sent by Kasahara to the general staff in Tokyo was intercepted and decoded by Soviet military intelligence and forwarded to Joseph Stalin. In it, Kasahara belittled the Red Army's capabilities and urged "a speedy war" before a good timing passed. On 13 December 1931, the OGPU decoded and forwarded to Stalin a conversation between Kasahara and his superior visiting in Moscow advocating for war before the USSR grew too strong, underscoring that "the countries on the Soviet western border (i.e., at a minimum Poland and Romania) are in a position to act with us". The thinking of Japanese ambassador to USSR, Hirota Koki, "the cardinal objective of this war must lay not so much in protecting Japan from Communism as in seizing the Soviet Far East and Eastern Siberia", was also mentioned.

On his return to Japan, he was assigned to the Soviet Branch of the 4th Section (European & American Military Intelligence), 2nd Bureau, of the Imperial Japanese Army General Staff Office.

From 1933 to 1934, he became an instructor at the Cavalry School, and was subsequently appointed commander of the Imperial Guards Cavalry Regiment from 1934 to 1936. Kasahara returned to the 2nd Bureau of the General Staff in 1936 as Chief of the 4th Section, 5th Section and 6th Section, covering all of the European, American and Russian Intelligence. He was a major proponent of the Strike North Group (hokushin-ron) philosophy, feeling strongly that the Soviet Union posed a major threat and a major opportunity for Japan.

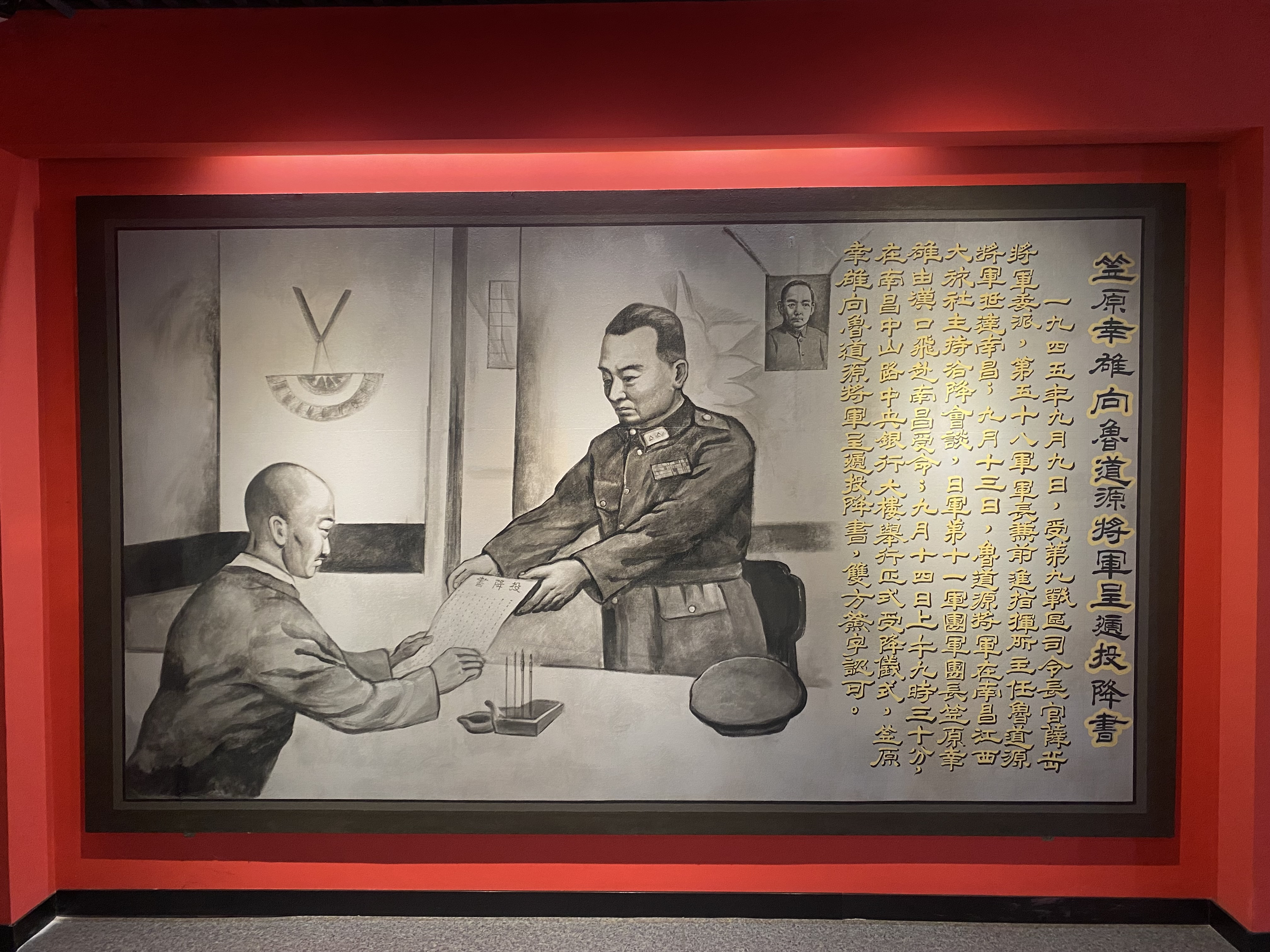
Kasahara submitting a letter of surrender to General Lu Daoyuan

From 1937 to 1938, Kasahara was sent to Manchukuo as Vice Chief of Staff of the Kwantung Army. He visited Germany as part of a military mission in 1938 after the conclusion of the Tripartite Pact, and returned to the General Staff on his return to Japan. However, Kasahara was soon dispatched back to China. From 1939 to 1941, he served as Chief of Staff of the Northern China Area Army. He was then promoted to commander in chief of the IJA 12th Division from 1941 to 1942. For most of the remainder of the war (1942–1945), Kasahara served as Chief of Staff of the Kwantung Army. However, in April 1945, he was appointed to replace General Yoshio Kozuki as commander of the IJA 11th Army, and thus participated in Operation Ichi-Go, notably at the Battle of Guilin-Liuzhou.
