= Bombing of Liuzhai (1944) =

The Bombing of Liuzhai, also known as the Liuzhai Massacre, occurred on November 25 or November 27 of 1944 during the Battle of Guilin–Liuzhou of the Second Sino-Japanese War, when American pilots operating in the Republic of China mistakenly bombed the town of Liuzhai, resulting in thousands of National Revolutionary Army and civilian deaths.

== Background ==
On November 11, 1944, Guilin and Liuzhou fell to the Imperial Japanese Army. General Zhang Fakui of the National Revolutionary Army (NRA) ordered a redeployment of his troops to the west of Liuzhou. During this time, Zhang Fakui was accompanied only by the special service regiment of the headquarters, and they began a steady retreat as Japanese forces pursued them relentlessly. Their progress was hampered by massive crowds of refugees and many were trampled or starved to death as they fled the battlefield. Those who could not keep up or were left behind were massacred in large groups by the Imperial Japanese Army. On November 24, Zhang Fakui arrived at Liuzhai, a small town on the border of Guizhou and Guangxi, and set up his headquarters at a bus station.

== Bombing ==
On November 27, seventeen aircraft flew over the small town. Recognizing them as American ones, Zhang Fakui rushed out to watch them when a bomb dropped into his headquarters just as he was at the door, nearly killing him. His guard, who also had the surname Zhang, was bisected by the waist. The aircraft also attacked the NRA anti-air and artillery positions in Liuzhai. For half an hour, the American aircraft continued dropping bombs at a low altitude, turning the small town, less than three square kilometers of area, into a sea of fire. One lieutenant general, two major generals, eight colonels, nearly a thousand officers and soldiers, and over ten thousand civilians all perished in the flames, their bodies never recovered. All important supplies were also destroyed. Zhang Fakui later discovered that an intelligence officer in the rear had made a mistake when deciphering a telegram, misreading Liujia (六甲) as Liuzhai (六寨). As a result, the American aircraft did not bomb the Imperial Japanese garrison at Liujia but instead bombed Liuzhai, a National Revolutionary Army garrison a hundred and fifty li away.

According to the China Flying Tigers Research Association's website, after the fall of Liuzhou, the railway stations of Liujia, Bagong, and Bawei southeast of Nandan were abandoned with all materials left behind. Chen Sunong, the commander of the 97th Army, telegraphed to Chongqing requesting that these stations be bombed so that the military supplies would not fall into enemy hands. However, the U.S. pilots received the wrong transcription of 'Zhai' instead of 'Jia'. On the morning of November 25, nine U.S. aircraft flew over the Liujia and Nandan areas before turning towards Liuzhai north of Nandan and dropping leaflets along the road informing Chinese refugees to stay off the main roads. However, as the aircraft were clearly from the Allies, the civilians instead crowded the street to witness the U.S. aircraft soaring overhead. Around afternoon after circling around Nandan once more, the nine aircraft flew over Liuzhai and began dropping bombs. Liuzhai had no train stations or any carriages, and the bombing was done where the refugees had gathered. The aircraft dove down and strafed at the crowds repeatedly with 13 mm caliber machine guns before flying away towards the Mawei railway station seven li away. In the bombing of the small town of Liuzhai, over half of the special service regiment of the Fourth War Zone's headquarters perished. Lieutenant General Chen Keqiu of the Military Training Department, Major General Wang Huiwu of the Cadre Training Regiment, another major general of an anti-aircraft unit, 200 officers, and 800 NCOs and soldiers were all killed in the U.S. bombing. Lei Tingyu, a section chief of the Guilin Municipal Post and Telecommunications Bureau who had accompanied the army to Liuzhai, was also killed along with nearly ten thousand civilians. Thousands of buildings were reduced to ashes as well as dozens of the National Revolutionary Army’s military vehicles, a number of artillery pieces, and all supplies and materials at the rear.

Other sources stated that Major General Cen Keng of the Anti-Air Command was the other general killed in the U.S. accidental bombing of Liuzhai alongside Chen Keqiu and Wang Huiwu. According to the "History of the Air Defense Anti-Japanese War", the 3rd District of the Anti-Air Command along with elements of the 43rd and 47th Artillery Regiments stationed in the Hunan-Guangxi border retreated to southern Guizhou with the Fourth War Zone headquarters after the fall of Guilin and Liuzhou. In late November, the units successively arrived at Mawei with the intention of regrouping before moving towards Zhuyuan. On November 27, six U.S. aircraft mistakenly attacked Mawei, dropping over a hundred bombs and reducing all major structures to ashes. The anti-air troops had believed those were friendly aircraft and had taken no defensive precautions, resulting in very heavy losses and numerous casualties including the deaths of Cen Keng, the commander of the 3rd District of the Anti-Air Command, and Lin Zehuan, the commander of the 43rd Artillery Regiment. Wang Zhenyu, the commander of the 47th Artillery Regiment, was wounded and dozens of other officers and soldiers also perished. The loss of weapons, equipment, and supplies were immense and as a result, the 3rd District of the Anti-Air Command and the 47th Artillery Regiment were disbanded and its personnel and weapons merged with the 43rd Artillery Regiment.

== Aftermath ==
Decades after the incident, history books published by the Chinese Communist Party still claimed that Liuzhai was flattened by Imperial Japanese aircraft. For example, in volume 40 of "Selected Historical Materials" published by the National Committee of the Chinese People's Political Consultative Conference, there was an account by Cao Fuqian, the former chief of staff of the 166th Division of the 97th Army, who had remained in mainland China after the Chinese Civil War, that stated 'Liuzhai was a large market town. It was flattened by Japanese aircraft. Zhang Fakui was nearly killed by the bombing.'

Zhang Fakui regarded this massive loss of lives of soldiers and civilians as the greatest tragedy he had experienced in his life. He later received a telegram from General Vincent in Kunming on November 29 acknowledging that the accidental bombing had caused massive losses on the National Revolutionary Army and civilians and that he did not know how this grave mistake could be remedied. Zhang Fakui could only think that if the bombs had dropped on the intended target at Liujia, the Japanese Army would certainly have suffered greatly. In the subsequent investigation over responsibility, China and the United States shifted blame to one another and the matter was left unresolved. The translator was later sentenced to death by a military court, but the Fourth War Zone had already been severely damaged.

The vast majority of the military transport vehicles and vital equipment and all documents of the Fourth War Zone including operational plans and military training materials were lost. According to Zhang Fakui, the Fourth War Zone was in no state to offer any real resistance anymore. To make matters worse, the Imperial Japanese Army occupied Nandan on November 28 and crossed the Guizhou-Guangxi border to pursue the retreating National Revolutionary Army, something which the Fourth War Zone had believed the Imperial Japanese Army was unable to do. Since Zhang Fakui had lost control over most of his troops and retreated into Guizhou, which was akin to entering a neighboring country, he requested Chiang Kai-shek to remove him of his command of the Guizhou-Guangxi Railway so that he could resume command of his troops stationed in Guangxi.
