= Second Guangxi campaign =

1945 counteroffensive of the Second Sino-Japanese War

Second Guangxi Campaign
- Part of the Second Sino-Japanese War of World War II
Date	15 April – 21 August 1945 (4 months and 6 days)
Location	Guangxi province in the Republic of China
Result	Chinese victory

Belligerents
(Republic of China (1912–1949)) China	(Empire of Japan) Japan

Commanders and leaders
(Republic of China (1912–1949)) Zhang Fakui (Republic of China (1912–1949)) Tang Enbo	(Empire of Japan) Yukio Kasahara

Strength
Chinese Claim : Fourteen divisions	Chinese Claim : Approximately 41,300 men in four divisions and two independent mixed brigades

Casualties and losses
Chinese Claim : 129 officers and 2,834 soldiers killed 280 officers and 4,582 soldiers wounded 10 officers and 402 soldiers missing.	Chinese Claim : 5,651 killed 7,891 wounded 70 captured

The Second Guangxi campaign (Chinese: 桂柳反攻作戰) was a three-front Chinese counter offensive to retake the last major Japanese stronghold in Guangxi province, South China during April–August 1945. The campaign was successful, and plans were being made to mop up the remaining scattered Japanese troops in the vicinity of Shanghai and the east coast when the Soviets invaded Manchuria and the Americans dropped atomic bombs on Hiroshima and Nagasaki, leading to Japan's surrender and ending the eight-year-long Second Sino-Japanese War.

== Battle process ==
Chiang Kai-shek ordered the Southeast Front under the command of Army Commander-in-Chief He Yingqin to launch the Guiliu counterattack. Zhang Fakui's Second Front Army captured Du'an with part of the 46th Army, and then went out of the Duyang Mountains to seize Yongning; Tang Enbo's Third Front Army went straight to Liuzhou and crossed the Chengling Mountains to attack Guilin. The National Army conquered Yongning on May 27, 1945, and the Japanese army retreated to Longzhou and Liuzhou. The National Army recaptured Liuzhou on June 30. Afterwards, the 20th and 29th Armies of the National Revolutionary Army under the Third Front Army were divided into three routes and marched towards Guilin along the Guiliu Highway and the Hunan-Guangxi Railway. By July 17, they had recaptured Luorong, Zhongdu and Huangmian. The Japanese retreated to Yongfu and resisted stubbornly.

On July 24, they captured Yongfu, the southern gateway of Guilin. At this time, one part of the troops captured Lipu, Baisha and Yangshuo along the Guiliu Highway and approached the suburbs of Guilin. Another part captured Baishou, and then attacked Guilin from three sides. The 94th Army of the National Revolutionary Army attacked Yining, and the 26th Army of the National Revolutionary Army attacked and advanced between Quanxian and Xing'an. On July 10, they attacked Nanwei, and on the 26th, they captured Yining and advanced towards the suburbs of Guilin.

Under the general offensive of the National Army and the shrinking defense line of the Japanese Army, the National Army advanced smoothly in the early stage of the counterattack. On July 28, the Third Front Army recaptured Guilin and continued to pursue eastward.

On August 9, 1945, the Third Front Army of the National Army marched northeast of Guilin in an attempt to recapture the whole county. According to the history of the National Army, the troops were ambushed by the Japanese army's tanks and infantry troops around the county on August 12 and retreated. On August 13, the whole county was recaptured by the Japanese army. However, according to the records of the Japanese army, the 11th Army headquarters was still in Quanzhou County and could not withdraw to Hunan Province. The 58th Division, the 22nd Independent Mixed Brigade, and the 88th Independent Mixed Brigade were stationed around the headquarters. Therefore, the National Army underestimated the actual size of its troops in the county and did not actually control the entire county.

On August 14, 1945, the 5th Division of the National Revolutionary Army conquered Baisha again; the 133rd Division of the 20th Army repelled the Japanese troops that invaded Xianshui. At this time, the 20th Army launched another attack on the whole county, and the Japanese army gradually retreated to the northeast of Guangxi Province. On August 16, the main force of the 133rd Division attacked the Japanese troops in Ma'anling and Meinuzhuang Highland. On the morning of the same day, the national army on the eastern front entered Wuzhou and captured more than 100 Japanese soldiers in the city alive.

The entire eastern part of Guangxi was liberated. At dawn on August 17, the Third Front Army launched another attack on Quanxian along the highway. At about 10 o'clock in the morning, it entered the county town. The reserve 11th Division, which had entered the southern suburbs of Quanxian, also entered. The Japanese army continued to retreat along the highway toward Huangsha River and Dong'an in the northeast of Quanxian. On August 18, the 134th Division recaptured Huangsha River, and the entire Guangxi was liberated. The national army advanced into Hunan. On August 21, the 41st Division of the 26th Army recaptured Dong'an; the pursuit team of the 134th Division recaptured Lingling, and the remaining Japanese troops retreated to Hengyang.

In the later stage of the Guiliu Campaign, the United States dropped an atomic bomb on Nagasaki, Japan on August 9, 1945. The Soviet Union declared war on Japan on August 8, and the Japanese Emperor announced his surrender on August 15.

On August 21, 1945, Lingling was liberated and the Guiliu counter-offensive ended. The attacking troops then changed their mission to disarm the Japanese army.

According to the military history "Memoirs of the Wakamatsu Regiment" published in Japan after the war, 582 soldiers of the 65th Infantry Regiment of the 13th Division of the Japanese Army were killed in action in 1945 (excluding non-combat deaths such as deaths from illnesses, accidents, or suicides). Among them were 5 officers including Major Tabata, commander of the 1st Battalion, Lieutenant Mitsuyama, commander of the 10th Company, and Lieutenant Nakakura, commander of the Infantry Artillery Company.

== See also ==
- Second Guangxi campaign order of battle
