= Battle of Lingbao =

Battle of the Second Sino-Japanese War

- Part of Operation Ichi-Go in the Second Sino-Japanese War
Date	June 1–17, 1944 (2 weeks and 2 days)
Location	Vicinity of Shanzhou and Lingbao on the border of Henan and Shaanxi, China
Result	Japanese victory

Belligerents
(Republic of China (1912–1949)) National Revolutionary Army, China	(Empire of Japan) Japanese North China Area Army, Imperial Japanese Army, Japan

Commanders and leaders
(Republic of China (1912–1949)) Jiang Dingwen (Republic of China (1912–1949)) Hu Zongnan (Republic of China (1912–1949)) Li Yannian	(Empire of Japan) Teiichi Yoshimoto

Units involved
Eleven divisions from the First and Eighth War Zones	First Army : 69th Division; 3rd Independent Mixed Brigade; 9th Independent Infantry Brigade; From the Twelfth Army : 3rd Tank Division; Two infantry battalions of the 62nd Division

Strength
Tens of thousands	?

Casualties and losses
8,761 killed, wounded, or missing	59th Infantry Brigade of the 69th Division : considerable casualties 14th Independent Infantry Battalion of the 62nd Division : 58 killed, 74 wounded, and 2 missing Other units : unknown

The Battle of Lingbao was an engagement on the border of Henan and Shaanxi provinces between the Chinese Eighth War Zone and the Japanese First Army in the first stage of Operation Ichi-Go. Also known as the The Counterattack on Shanzhou and the Battle in the Vicinity of Lingbao by the Chinese National Revolutionary Army, it encompassed the Chinese offensive towards Shanzhou and the Japanese offensive towards Lingbao following the defeat of the Chinese First War Zone against the Japanese Twelfth Army in Henan province.

== Background ==
During the Beijing-Hankou operation, the First Army's primary role was in supporting the Twelfth Army and defeating any reinforcements from the Eighth War Zone. As the main operation was progressing smoothly for the Twelfth Army, the North China Area Army drafted a plan to reinforce the First Army for the Tongguan operation in Shaanxi which would follow after the Twelfth Army defeated the First War Zone in the Beijing-Hankou operation. The China Expeditionary Army believed that capturing Tongguan would be a great value for future operations against Xi'an and Hanzhong. However, given that Operation Ichi-Go was currently underway with limited forces, the Expeditionary Army would only allow the Tongguan operation to proceed if it would not hinder the Beijing-Hankou and Hunan-Guangxi operations, and if it would only be conducted solely by the North China Area Army without a redeployment of forces. As a result, the area army decided to abandon the plan due to manpower constraints. However, considerations for the Tongguan operation still remained strong as the First Army crossed the Yellow River.

In late April, the North China Area Army summoned Colonel Kanichi Sasai, the chief operations staff officer of the First Army, to give instructions for the First Army's operational actions to occupy key locations near Shan County in preparations for a decisive battle with the Eighth War Zone in the Tongguan operation. On the night of May 9, after crossing the Yellow River near Yuanqu, the First Army ordered the 69th Division to advance along the Longhai Railway to pursue the First War Zone retreating towards the Luo River. The 3rd Independent Mixed Brigade (consisting of three infantry battalions) was dispatched to Daying in the vicinity of Shan County to secure the eastern part of the Longhai Railway. On May 17, the First Army received intelligence that Chinese forces, namely the 8th Division and 109th Division of the Chinese 1st Army of Li Yannian's 34th Group Army, had reached Lingbao. Hu Zongnan, commander-in-chief of the Eighth War Zone, was also at Tongguan. Yoshimoto believed that it was necessary to attack the Chongqing Army near Lingbao and ordered the 69th Division which was pursuing the enemy at the Luo River to quickly move towards Shan County. On May 17, the 3rd Independent Mixed Brigade stormed into the northeast corner of Shan County, occupying the surrounding areas by May 18. Daying was also captured on the same day. In the battle for Shan County, the 23rd Regiment of the 8th Division suffered more than 500 casualties and deputy regimental commander Song Wenhuan was killed in action.

On May 14, the 106th Division of Ma Fawu's 40th Army, which had been fighting in the Yiyang area during the battle of Central Henan, was put under the command of Hu Zongnan's Eighth War Zone. On May 20, Li Yannian moved the command post of the 34th Group Army to Xiaochang Village in Lingbao. At the time, the remnants of the 4th, 14th, 36th, and 39th Group Armies of the First War Zone had finished redeployment under the cover of the Eighth War Zone. All units of the Eighth War Zone east of Tongguan and the First War Zone north of Luoyang were unified under the command of commander-in-chief Jiang Dingwen while the First War Zone south of Luoyang was abolished and all units of the First War Zone under deputy commander-in-chief Tang Enbo was reorganized into the Sixth War Zone under the command of commander-in-chief Chen Cheng. After the fall of Shanzhou, Chiang Kai-shek ordered a counter-offensive to relieve Luoyang. On May 23, Chiang changed the target of the offensive to Shanzhou considering that it was impossible for Hu Zongnan to launch a counter-offensive against Luoyang while the First War Zone was exhausted and defeated. On May 25, upon hearing the news about the fall of Luoyang, Chiang ordered a temporary suspension on Order No. 21, the attack order on Shanzhou. On May 30, Chiang Kai-shek instructed the counteroffensive against Shanzhou to begin on June 1.

The reinforcements from the Eighth War Zone and the gradual recovery of the First War Zone's fighting strength were a source of worry for the First Army, which believed that the enemy was planning to retake Shan County and launch a counteroffensive toward Guanyintang. On May 27, General Yoshimoto telegraphed to the North China Area Army a proposal to launch an offensive against the Eighth War Zone in the vicinity of Lingbao and defeat the enemy within one week. With approximately fourteen battalions concentrated in the vicinity of Shan County, the First Army was confident that they could achieve their objective quickly and independently without reinforcements from the Area Army. General Yasuji Okamura immediately flew to Shan County with Colonel Yoshimoto, a senior staff officer of the Area Army. After a briefing with General Yoshimoto, not only did Okamura agree to the plan, but he also transferred several units from the Twelfth Army to be put under the command of the First Army. These temporarily assigned units were scheduled to return to the Twelfth Army on June 10, giving the First Army a deadline for the operation.

== Campaign ==
=== Chinese counteroffensive towards Shanzhou ===
On May 24, the 82nd Independent Infantry Battalion of the 59th Infantry Brigade of the 69th Division occupied the Xianshan Temple which was to be used as a stronghold for future operations. From May 27 to May 31, the opposing Chinese forces launched probing assaults against the stronghold which became increasingly tenacious as more troops gathered in the vicinity of the position. On June 1, the 316th Regiment of the 106th Division launched a general offensive, forming an encirclement around Xianshan Temple. The Yamada platoon of the 1st Company defending the focal point of the Chinese counterattack lost more than half of its troops in half an hour of fighting. Reinforcements arrived just as the platoon was about to lose combat effectiveness and together successfully held the position. Fighting lasted until the Chinese withdrew in the evening though they continued bombarding the position with artillery. Due to heavy casualties, Major General Chiyota Motomura, the commander of the 59th Infantry Brigade, ordered a mixed battalion from the 12th Mixed Infantry Regiment to relieve the 82nd Independent Infantry Battalion of their posts that night. The 9th Independent Infantry Brigade had dispatched a portion of its force to the Wuyuanyao and Hill 924.5 positions at the same time as Chinese 8th Division was launching its attack. The main force of the brigade and some tanks of the 3rd Tank Division soon arrived and surrounded Chinese troops at Wuyuan, inflicting heavy casualties. Since the 106th Division at the right flank had not achieved its objective of capturing Xianshan Temple, the 8th Division was left isolated and retreated to Dongjiazhuang. On June 3, deputy divisional commander Wang Jianyue directed the rearguard actions and led the division into safely withdrawing to the Hanjia and Lujing lines. According to Wu Jun, the commander of the 8th Division, the fierce fighting for Wuyuan and other positions were no less intense than the Battle of Shanghai, with the 9,700-strong division reduced to just 1,200 troops. (Note: The 8th Division was nearly wiped out in the battle of Shanghai, with just over 20 company commanders and platoon commanders and 300 combat soldiers left after nineteen days of fighting)

By June 3, the fighting had turned into a stalemate and the Chinese Army had lost the initiative for active actions. Hu Zongnan spoke with Chiang Kai-shek by phone and told him that the attack on Shanzhou had made no progress and he was worried about the combat effectiveness of the troops he had trained. On June 5, Chiang Kai-shek spoke again with Hu Zongnan and learned that the 8th Division had been attacked by enemy tanks at the west side of Daying and suffered heavy casualties. He then ordered Wang Shuming to provide full air support. On June 6, Hu Zongnan decided to halt the offensive and ordered all troops to withdraw back to their original positions.

The First Army was deeply concerned regarding the 69th Division's offensive capability. While they had held Xianshan Temple, the 118th and 84th Independent Infantry Battalions had suffered a defeat at the hands of the 178th Division of the 47th Army at the frontlines of Caomiao and Hill 1463 and were forced to retreat to Sanjiaoshan where they were under repeated attacks from the 14th and 47th Armies. The pointless battles that day had caused delays in the division's attack preparation and caused a weakening in combat strength before the Japanese offensive had even begun. At the start of June, reinforcements from the Twelfth Army sent on May 30 and May 31 began arriving one by one. On June 1, approximately two tank companies and the 3rd Battalion of the 3rd Mobile Infantry Regiment from the 3rd Tank Division reached the vicinity of Shan County, followed by the 11th and 14th Independent Infantry Battalions of the 62nd Division on June 1 and June 2, and the 1st Independent Mountain Artillery Battalion and 6th Field Heavy Artillery Regiment on June 3. On the evening of June 3, the general staff of the First Army received a telegraph that the main force of the 3rd Tank Division would also be placed under the command of the army. On June 4, the tank division reached the vicinity of Shan County.

=== Japanese offensive towards Lingbao ===
On June 5, the Japanese offensive began as scheduled. The 69th Division advanced from its designated positions at 6 a.m. However, the Chinese Air Force, which had only flown over Japanese positions to conduct reconnaissance twice in the Chinese counteroffensive last week, was quite active that day. Four aircraft attacked the 85th and 118th Independent Infantry Battalions advancing towards the high grounds of Caomiao, causing more than 80 casualties. At Sanjiaoshan, the Chinese Army suddenly launched an attack on the 84th Independent Infantry Battalion, causing many casualties including 22 killed. Major General Motomura ordered the 82nd Independent Infantry Brigade to the frontline and reorganized his troops with the 85th and 118th Independent Infantry Battalions as the right column and the 82nd and 84th Independent Infantry Battalions, the mixed battalion from the 12th Mixed Infantry Regiment, and the brigade headquarters as the left column. After fierce battles with heavy casualties, the 104th and 178th Divisions of the 47th Army were forced to retreat and the 59th Infantry Brigade occupied Meijia Mountain and Sanjia Mountain by 11 p.m. While the First Army staff expressed appreciation over the brigade's advance, from the perspective of the entire army, the progress had been unexpectedly slow due to treacherous terrain, with an advance of only 4-8 kilometers by night.

The 9th Independent Infantry Brigade, with support from the 3rd Tank Division, engaged with Chinese forces on the right bank of the Hongnong River on the morning of June 5, forcing them to retreat by the evening. On June 6, the Japanese Army continued expanding its gain, engaging in fierce fighting with the 47th Army near Yanjia Mountain and Meijia Mountain. By the evening, the Chinese Army was beginning to retreat, and the 3rd Independent Mixed Brigade pursued them towards the Duanmi River. Progress that day was not up to the First Army's expectation. Its original strategy was to focus on the left flank and cut off the retreat routes of the Chongqing forces in the mountainous areas towards the south and west. Instead, the left flank was gradually falling behind and the Chongqing forces on the right bank of the Hongnong River were withdrawing.

On June 7, Lieutenant General Chūjirō Miura, commander of the 69th Division, arrived at Donggou at 5 a.m. and received the report that the 59th Infantry Brigade was advancing northward. After contacting with the First Army, he learned that the army was planning to launch a general offensive targeting Chongqing forces near Guolue Town that evening or the next morning. Miura was eager to encircle and destroy the Chongqing forces on the right bank of the Hongnong River, but was unable to make contact with his troops and could only wait anxiously. In the evening, the lieutenant general departed from Donggou towards Loudi. The 9th Independent Infantry Brigade fought with Chongqing forces on the right bank of the Hongnong River for the whole day. After breaking through Shangpotou, the 3rd Independent Mixed Brigade advanced towards the high grounds where Duanmi River was visible. Believing that the Chongqing forces on the opposite bank to be quite strong, Major General Kazuaki Obara made meticulous preparations for the forced crossing of the river.

On June 8, the 9th Independent Infantry Brigade launched a massive assault against the positions of the 97th Division. At around 2 p.m., the brigade captured the Bian Village stronghold and the village of Majiazhai to its south, and was preparing to launch an attack on the left bank of the Hongnong River at dawn on the 9th. The 3rd Battalion of the 3rd Mobile Infantry Regiment of the 3rd Tank Division pursued the 97th Division towards Niuzhuang as the tanks of the division were unable to advance through the terraced terrain. The infantry battalion agreed to coordinate with the 9th Independent Infantry Brigade in breaking through the left bank of the Hongnong River the following day. The 97th Division suffered heavy casualties that day from the combined infantry and tank attacks including 2 battalion commanders killed in action. The 3rd Independent Mixed Brigade also began pursuing the enemy towards the Hongnong River. Its 8th Independent Infantry Battalion faced particularly fierce resistance from the 167th Division on the right flank and was unable to dislodge them from the riverbank. As fierce fighting broke out across the entire front, Hu Zongnan ordered Li Yannian to hold all positions firmly and anyone who retreated without authorization was to be summarily executed.

At 5 a.m., Lieutenant General Miura arrived at Loudi to direct the battle but lost contact with both the First Army and the 59th Infantry Brigade and was left in a state of uncertainty. The First Army was also unable to contact the 59th Infantry Brigade since its crossing of the Duanmi River on June 7. Repeated attempts were made to establish radio communication to no avail, causing great anxiety. The North China Area Army was also extremely concerned about the First Army's battle situation and repeatedly demanded updates as reports were not submitted in a timely manner. Senior staff officer Colonel Yoshimoto even sent a personal telegraph to Staff Officer Sasai, the operations chief of the First Army, asking for the true battlefield situation and if it was inconvenient to report to the high command, then he will keep it confidential. However, the First Army had nothing to report as contact with the 69th Division had been completely cut off.

On that day, 82nd Independent Infantry Battalion departed from Huangguliang at 2 a.m., advanced through enemy resistance and reached Poling at 10.30 a.m. As the battalion was unable to make contact with the 59th Infantry Brigade, Lieutenant Colonel Jinbō met with Lieutenant Colonel Saito, the commander of the 84th Independent Infantry Battalion, and learned that the brigade was intending to withdraw. Therefore, it was decided to cover the left flank of the brigade and then withdraw from the battlefield. After launching a feint attack, they assembled at Zhangjiapo at midnight. The 85th Independent Infantry Battalion broke through the positions of the 2nd Battalion of the 325th Regiment through the Qinling Mountains at the rear of the Chinese Army and reached Fufuyu on the morning of June 9. Due to the wide defensive line of the 325th Regiment and the lack of communications between the regiment and its battalions, regimental commander Liu Ming did not learn of this situation until the morning of June 10. It was only later that the 109th Division learned that the 3rd Reserve Division had intercepted and repelled these Japanese troops.

The 9th Independent Infantry Brigade continued its offensive on June 9, capturing some Chinese positions near Anli, a small village on the left bank of the Hongnong River. However, the 97th Division put up a strong resistance on a cliff in front of the village and halted the brigade's progress. Similarly, the 3rd Tank Division was only able to capture a corner of the position near Niuzhuang with its infantry as the tanks could not follow. Lieutenant General Miura continued attempting to contact the First Army and the 59th Infantry Brigade by radio without success. At noon, he decided to send his adjutant along with a squad of guards to pass through enemy lines and make contact with the First Army's command post. That morning, the First Army was still unaware about the situation of the 59th Infantry Brigade since June 7, but estimated that they were overcoming difficult terrain, capturing hilltop positions one by one, and steadily advancing forward.

At noon, the First Army finally received a telegraph from the 59th Infantry Brigade which contained the message that they had encountered fierce enemy resistance which had significantly slowed their progress. Moreover, the enemy had occupied the mountain paths in the Qinling Mountains and breaking through this area would be extremely difficult no matter how much sacrifices and time were invested. As a result, the brigade had no choice but to abandon this ambitious undertaking. After receiving this message, Staff Officer Sasai realized that the brigade had not followed the First Army's order to advance towards Xiangcheng Village and instead attempted to cross the Qinling Mountains for a large-scale encirclement but failed. Before the battle on June 1, Major General Motomura had proposed such a flanking maneuver through the Qinling Mountains to encircle the positions along the Hongnong River but it was shot down by Sasai who emphasized the need to break through the vicinity of Xiangcheng Village and that the brigade must act according to the First Army's intention. Having learned that the brigade had disobeyed orders, Sasai prepared for measures to be taken in case the First Army's objective could not be achieved and the deadline was passed. Since it was unknown what the brigade's current intention was, Sasai would only report the issue to the First Army's chief of staff.

Staff Officer Sasai summoned Chief of Staff Kazumaro Horike to the operations room, which at the time were attended by only two other staff officers. After showing the telegraph and reporting that they were currently studying contingency plans, Major General Horike made no further comment but hinted that this offensive had also been excessive before leaving. Shortly after, the army commander entered the operations room with a smile. Sasai quickly changed the subject and avoided any discussion of the battlefield situation. Before also quietly departing, the army commander said to Sasai that "Battles don't always go the way you want them to." which resonated with Sasai and he immediately regained his calm. Meanwhile, Lieutenant Matsutani, a liaison officer of the 69th Division, safely arrived at the First Army's command post late that night to report the situation of the 69th Division. Upon his return, he brought with him a letter from the First Army's chief of staff addressed to the divisional chief of staff Yamamoto, and returned to the 69th Division's headquarters on June 10.

Lieutenant General Miura was making every effort to maintain contact with the troops under his command at the right bank of the Duanmi River even as contact with the 59th Infantry Brigade was insufficient. The main force was fiercely attacking the fortified positions on the left bank of the Hongnong River near Wumu Street and Shangsong District but was thwarted by the rugged terrain and stubborn resistance from the 109th Division. The mixed battalion of the 12th Independent Infantry Regiment was likely near the riverbank and the 69th Division headquarters was also deep within enemy lines with Lieutenant General Miura personally encouraging his troops while directing the battle. The 3rd Independent Mixed Brigade advanced towards the vicinity of Majia'ao and Ci'ao, approaching the right bank of the Hongnong River near Xiangcheng Village after breaking through the positions of the 167th Division and was preparing to launch an attack on Shijiashan. After making contact with Lieutenant General Miura, Major General Motomura ordered the 59th Infantry Brigade to retreat eastward towards the vicinity of Runkou. The brigade was unable to establish contact with its 85th Independent Infantry Battalion still in the Qinling Mountains and could only hope that the battalion would break through. The 9th Independent Infantry Brigade broke through a corner of Anli and reached the vicinity of Xinzhuang on 7 p.m. Further advance was halted as the 97th Division regrouped and launched a counterattack. Similarly, the 3rd Battalion of the 3rd Mobile Infantry Regiment of the 3rd Tank Division and the 14th Independent Infantry Battalion were halted by the Chinese division after reaching the east side of Beiantou.

The battlefield assessment of the First Army that day was not positive. The army had planned for a decisive battle on June 8, but due to the unexpectedly fierce resistance from the Chongqing army and the obstacles posed by the mountainous terrain, they were unable to achieve such a result on the left bank of the Hongnong River by June 9. A day or two of setback was manageable for the army as the objective was gradually being completed. However, the attached units from the Twelfth Army were set to return on June 10, and the 59th Infantry Brigade, the main force of the First Army for this battle, was exhausted to the point that it might be difficult to reorganize. In response, the First Army staff had secretly begun studying countermeasures for the worst-case scenario, and had transferred the reserve 120th Independent Infantry Battalion to the frontline. The left bank of the Hongnong River was the Chinese's main line of resistance, with the 57th Army deployed at the north of Guolue Town and the 1st Army at the south for a final stand.

June 10 started with little progress made by either the 9th Independent Infantry Brigade at the high ground on the left bank of the Hongnong River or the 69th Division in its offensive. Since that day was supposed to be the deadline and the attached units were about to be withdrawn, if situations remained unchanged and the First Army pulled back while the battlefield was in a stalemate, it would be no different from a retreat. In particular, leaving the 85th Independent Infantry Battalion stranded in the Qinling Mountains would restrict the 69th Division's operations, potentially leading to serious consequences. After personally inspecting the front lines, the commander of the First Army concluded that the only viable strategy was to break through the enemy lines in front of the 9th Independent Infantry Brigade with a powerful offensive. The army staff also consulted with the 3rd Tank Division at its command post and discovered they were still unable to send tanks to the high ground on the left bank of the Hongnong River. Although a tank passage was being constructed on the cliff west of Niuzhuang, the Chongqing troops were firing from concealed gun emplacements, obstructing the construction. Even if those positions could be eliminated, there were still major obstacles ahead, and progress had become completely hopeless. Lieutenant General Hideo Yamaji, the commander of the 3rd Tank Division, stated that in order to shift the point of breakthrough towards Guolue Town, the tanks would move in that direction that night. To further improve the situation, Staff Officer Sasai also considered deploying the elite 120th Independent Infantry Battalion to the front. This battalion was scheduled to reach the vicinity of Shan County at midnight.

=== Collapse of the Chinese defenses ===
The 14th Independent Infantry Battalion had been attached to the 3rd Tank Division during the Japanese offensive. On June 9, they participated in the attack on Anli and Zaoshupo. That evening, the 97th Division formed an assault detachment and launched repeated counterattacks against the battalion. At 9 a.m. on June 10, acting battalion commander Major Kanemori and most of the personnel of the battalion headquarters were killed in action. Lieutenant Ozaki, despite being seriously wounded, took over command. After repelling a Chinese counter-offensive, the battalion launched a fierce charge and, along with the 3rd Tank Division, surrounded the headquarters of the 97th Division and the headquarters of the 57th Army. From the evening of June 9 to the evening that day, the battalion suffered more than 70 casualties. Lieutenant Ozaki was sent to the rear and infantry artillery company commander Shibata took command of the battalion. The 9th Independent Infantry Brigade also pursued the 97th Division towards the Fupaoying and Nanying line. Zhang Zhen, the commander of the Chinese 1st Army, led the 106th Division, the army's assault unit, and the remnants of the 8th Division to reinforce the breached positions of the 97th Division, but could not reverse the situation against the 3rd Tank Division and the 8th Division suffered heavy casualties including the death of deputy divisional commander Wang Jianyue and his orderly. By then, the whole division had no cadres left and nine corporals and squad commanders had to serve as acting company commanders.

The 3rd Independent Mixed Brigade had not made a smooth progress on the attack at Shijiashan since the morning of June 9. The brigade commander judged that as long as Shijiashan was captured, Guolue Town would be easily taken. On the night of June 9, the 7th Independent Infantry Battalion launched a night attack on the position. Despite fierce resistance from the 167th Division, the battalion captured Shijiashan at 5:00 a.m. on June 10. Liang Zhang, deputy regimental commander of the 499th Regiment, attempted to commit suicide on the battlefield and was hospitalized. After hearing that the 3rd Independent Mixed Brigade had captured Shijiashan, the 69th Division also advanced, crossing the Duanmi River in the evening.

At this point, the Chinese front-line troops were embroiled in chaotic fighting. That morning, the position south of Guolue Town, defended by the 499th Regiment of the 167th Division under He Yichi, was breached. In the evening, the 97th Division under Fu Weifan retreated on orders from Liu Anqi, commander of the 57th Army. At the same time, the Chinese Army's rear was threatened by the enemy at Fufuyu. The situation on the Lingbao battlefield was extremely critical. Li Yannian, seeing the difficult situation at the front, requested a complete retreat from Hu Zongnan who reported to Chiang Kai-shek. Around 6 p.m., Chiang Kai-shek ordered Hu Zongnan to hold the Guolue-Lingbao line and forbade anyone from retreating westward under penalty of execution by collective punishment. Before dusk, Zhang Zhuo inspected the battle situation west of Guolue Town and realized he was powerless to reverse the defeat. He called Hu Zongnan to report that the situation was extremely critical and that if they did not move their positions, they risked being surrounded and annihilated by the Japanese Army. At 11 p.m., Hu Zongnan reported the situation to Chiang Kai-shek again who relented and told Hu Zongnan to handle everything as he saw fit. Hu Zongnan gave the withdrawal order at midnight. However, many units were already withdrawing before the order, and tens of thousands of troops were retreating in the same route, causing much chaos and most supplies to be abandoned. Lingbao, Hangu Pass, and Guolue Town all fell on the same day. The Chinese Army was in a state of retreat and the 3rd Reserve Division and the 39th Division were ordered to reinforce the frontline.

The 59th Infantry Brigade crossed the Hongnong River at night and advanced rapidly towards the Yongquanshu line, which was defended by one Chinese division covering the retreat of other troops. The 82nd Independent Infantry Battalion pursued the enemy vanguard but suffered losses three times from landmines. At around 8 a.m on June 11, the battalion reached the high ground south of Yongquanshu but was soon attacked by seven P-40s resulting in more casualties. Prior to this, the 59th Infantry Brigade had failed to break through enemy positions in the southern area of Xiangcheng Village and its combat capabilities had reached its limits. Lieutenant General Miura dispatched Chief of Staff Yamamoto to direct the brigade towards Xizhang Village, 4 kilometers northwest of Guolue Town. During the retreat, Major General Motomura triggered a landmine in Yingtian, one kilometer northwest of Guolue Town, and was immediately killed at 4:10 a.m on June 11. He was the highest-ranking Japanese officer to have been killed in the Central Henan campaign and his death was a great source of sorrow for Lieutenant General Miura.

The 85th Independent Infantry Battalion finally broke through the Qinling Mountains on June 10. By this point, the battalion had no strength left and could only watch as the Chongqing Army retreated westward from Wenxiang without being able to take any active actions. At the time, the situation of the 69th Division was improving and the 3rd Tank Division was pursuing the enemy from Guolue Town. The First Army believed that, even with the enemy still fiercely resisting, they could deal a heavy blow if they had pressed on. However, the time for the withdrawal had arrived and the Japanese Army could only force the Chongqing Army to retreat. Thus, after assigning the recently-transferred 120th Independent Infantry brigade as a covering force, the Japanese Army also began withdrawing after sunset on June 12 back to the original line. By June 15, the various units of the Japanese Army had finished their withdrawal without trouble as the Chongqing forces had retreated to Tongguan and did not pursue them aggressively. On June 13, Major General Naoto Matsuzaki was ordered to take over command of the 59th Infantry Brigade. The Chinese Army only began the pursuit in earnest on the morning of June 15, with the 3rd Reserve Division recovering Guolue Town and the 116th Regiment of the 39th Division recovering Lingbao by the evening. By June 17, the Chinese and Japanese armies were in a stand-off at Daying. On June 20, the headquarters of the First Army returned to Shanxi Province.

== Aftermath ==
Compared to previous major battles, the Chinese Army did not suffer particularly heavy casualties in this engagement. Although the Japanese Army claimed to have achieved their operational objective, they actually suffered considerable losses and failed to crush the Chinese Army, making a victory difficult to claim. On the other side, the Chinese Army's counterattack on Shanzhou failed, their defensive positions were breached, and they also failed to accomplish their original operational goals. After the Japanese withdrawal, Hu Zongnan secretly ordered the arrest of Dai Muzhen, commander of the 109th Division, and Liu Ming, commander of the 325th Regiment of the 109th Division. Subsequently, Fu Weifan, commander of the 97th Division, He Yichi, commander of the 499th Regiment of the 167th Division, Hu Xuebing, commander of the 501st Regiment of the 167th Division, along with Dai Muzhen and Liu Ming, were escorted to Xi'an. On June 21, Hu Zongnan drafted a reward and punishment system for the commanders of various armies, divisions, and regiments of the battle and submitted it to Chiang Kai-shek for approval. On June 24, Fu Weifan was executed by Chiang Kai-shek's order.

On June 25, during the review meeting on the Lingbao Campaign, Hu Zongnan announced based on Chiang Kai-shek's order that Fu Weifan, He Yichi, and Liu Ming were executed on the spot according to the principle of collective responsibility. Fu Weifan and He Yichi were accused of retreating without authorization and Liu Ming was accused of allowing the enemy to infiltrate Fufuyu, leading to an unfavorable battle situation. Dai Muzhen was dismissed from his post and investigated after being accused of incompetence and cowardice in command and Wang Longji, divisional commander of the 167th Division, was demoted to colonel. According to Huang Jiangfu, deputy divisional commander and chief of staff of the 109th Division, Dai Muzhen was later sentenced to five years of imprisonment, while according to divisional commander Wu Jun, Dai Muzhen was sentenced to twelve years of imprisonment. Zeng Qingchun, regimental commander of the 290th Regiment of the 97th Division, regimental commander Hu Xuebing, He Guoxiang, regimental commander of the 23rd Regiment of the 8th Division, and Huang Xiaoxuan, regimental commander of the 24th Regiment of the 8th Division, were all also sentenced to imprisonment. All officers punished by Chiang Kai-shek's orders were from the four divisions most involved in the defensive phase, namely the 8th, 97th, 109th, and 167th Divisions. Three generals were awarded military merit certificates—Li Zhenqing, commander of the 106th Division, for covering the anti-tank guns, Si Yuankai, commander of the 39th Division, for recapturing Lingbao City, and Chen Julu, commander of the 3rd Reserve Division, for repelling enemy forces at Fufuyu. Many other officers were also commended for their performances in the battle. The 97th Division's designation was cancelled and its troops were transferred to the 8th, 167th, and 109th Divisions.
