= Battle of Guilin–Liuzhou =

Battle of the Second Sino-Japanese War

Coordinates: 23°36′N 108°18′E

Battle of Guilin-Liuzhou
- Part of Operation Ichi-Go in the Second Sino-Japanese War of World War II
Date	August 16 – November 24, 1944 (3 months, 1 week and 1 day)
Location	Vicinities of Guilin city and Liuzhou city, Guangxi province, Republic of China
Result	Japanese victory

Belligerents
(Republic of China (1912–1949)) China; United States (air support only)	(Empire of Japan) Japan

Commanders and leaders
(Republic of China (1912–1949)) Bai Chongxi (Republic of China (1912–1949)) Zhang Fakui (Republic of China (1912–1949)) Kan Weiyong † (Republic of China (1912–1949)) Chen Jihuan † (Republic of China (1912–1949)) Lü Zhanmeng †	(Empire of Japan) Yasuji Okamura (Empire of Japan) Hisakazu Tanaka

Units involved
National Revolutionary Army Ground Forces; Chinese-American Composite Wing	Imperial Japanese Army: 11th Army; 23rd Army

Strength
Western Claim : 400,000 troops Chinese Claim : Approximately 100,000 troops (Note: Many of the divisions were units of the Ninth Military Front which had been badly damaged in the Campaign of Changsha-Hengyang.)	160,000 troops 150 planes Numerous tanks and armoured cars Naval support from 2nd China Expeditionary Fleet Chinese Claim : approximately 111,000 troops

Casualties and losses
Chinese claim casualties : Various units under Zhang Fakui's command : (Note: As the 31st Corps was wiped out defending Guilin, its last battle report was on November 8 and there was no information regarding its casualties afterwards.; Including the 100th Corps of the 24th Army Group and the 97th and 98th Corps of the Guizhou-Guangxi-Hunan Border Area.; Excluding the 91st Division of the 29th Corps of the Guizhou-Guangxi-Hunan Border Area and local militias.); 14,789 killed 10,469 wounded 13,066 missing 38,324 total casualties 91st Division of the 29th Corps : 365 killed 350 wounded 21 missing Defense of Guilin : Japanese claim on November 11, 1944 after the capture of the city : 5,665 killed and 13,151 captured. Guilin City Chronicles claim : 6,488 killed and 13,151 captured. (Note: Based on Japanese claim with the addition of the 823 Chinese soldiers who died in the Seven-star Cave after the Japanese Army released poison gas into the cave.) In the bombing of Liuzhai : nearly 1,000 military personnel killed.	Unknown: 22nd Division of the 23rd Army : 149 killed, 250 died of wounds or illnesses.

The Battle of Guilin–Liuzhou (simplified Chinese: 桂柳会战; traditional Chinese: 桂柳會戰; pinyin: Gùilǐu Huìzhàn), also known as the Battle of Guiliu, was one of the 22 major engagements between the National Revolutionary Army (NRA) and Imperial Japanese Army (IJA) during the Second Sino-Japanese War.

This battle was the third of the three-part Battle of Henan-Hunan-Guangxi, also known as Operation Ichigo. As part of the operation, a major aim of this attack was to connect the pieces of Japanese-held territory, and also, to destroy airbases in the area which were housing USAAF aircraft.

In August, after battles in Hunan and Guangdong, the 11th and 23rd Armies of the IJA launched attacks towards Guilin and Liuzhou, respectively. The NRA troops defending the area were mainly the remnants from the Battle of Hengyang, and therefore, only 20,000 troops were at Guilin on 1 November when the Japanese started their attack on the city.

The government of China knew that it would not be able to hold Guilin, but deliberately extended the battle for domestic political reasons, sending food and supplies to the besieged. Most civilians fled weeks before from Guilin, which was scorched heavily by fire. Guilin had been reinforced with defences, pillboxes, barbed wire, and the Guangxi troops under the command of Muslim General Bai Chongxi. General Joseph Stilwell, who was friendly with Bai, went to great pains to send American munitions to Bai's forces. Trenches were dug amid the hills.

After 10 days of intense fighting, the Japanese occupied Guilin, and on the same day entered Liuzhou as well. Fighting continued sporadically as Chinese forces made their rapid retreat, and on 24 November the Japanese were in control of 75 counties in Guangxi, roughly two-thirds its area, and are said to have killed 215,000 civilians in reprisal and during crossfire, wounding more than 431,000.

== Accidental Allied bombing of Liuzhai ==
On November 27, 1944, U.S. bombers attacked the Chinese-controlled town of Liuzhai due to a transcription mistake. As a result, nearly 1,000 military personnel of the Fourth War Zone's headquarters including one lieutenant general, two major generals, and eight colonels along with over 10,000 refugees fleeing the battlefield were killed. General Zhang Fakui himself narrowly escaped death.

== Evaluation ==
After Guilin and Liuzhou were lost, most NRA troops lost morale and retreated without ever engaging the enemy, resulting in tremendous loss of materiel and manpower. This became one of the most devastating losses during the entire Second Sino-Japanese war.

However, despite having destroyed the airbases in this region, the USAAF could still strike at the Japanese main islands from their other bases. Although the Japanese partially accomplished the goals of Operation Ichigo, it increased the area that Japanese troops had to defend, and substantially thinned out their lines, setting up a favourable situation for subsequent counterattacks by Chinese forces.

Japanese Marshal Shunroku Hata suspected that New Guangxi clique leaders Li Zongren and Bai Chongxi had kept their troops out of serious fighting in the defenses of Guilin and Liuzhou to preserve their strength for the future due to the political situation in east China.

== See also ==
- The Flying Tigers
- The Hump
