= Liu Jiang =

Liu Jiang (Wade–Giles: Liu Chiang) may refer to:

- Liu River or Liu Jiang, Guangxi, China
- Liu Jiang (politician) (born 1940), Minister of Agriculture of China
- Liu Jiang (director) (born 1969), Chinese director

== See also ==
- Liujiang District, Guangxi, China
- Liujiang man, early modern humans found in East Asia
