= Liuzhou =

Liuzhou 柳州市 • Liujcouh Si Liuchow
- Prefecture-level city
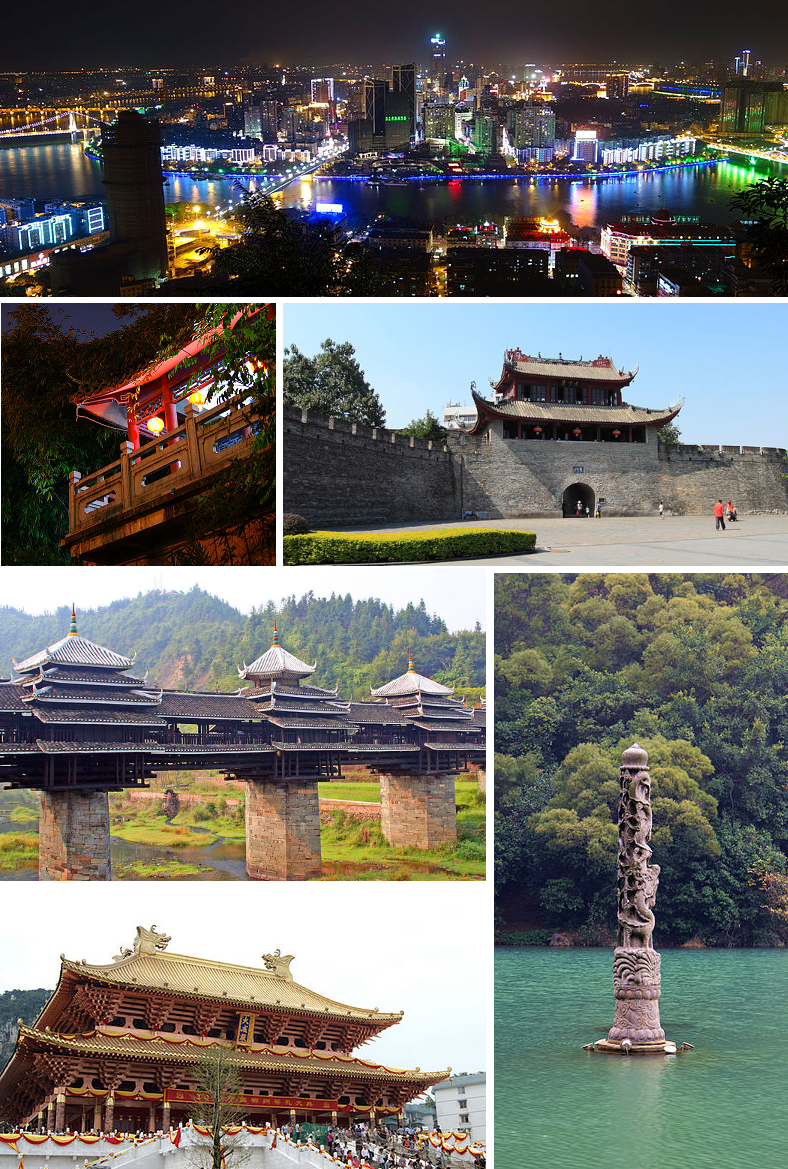
- Clockwise, from top: City center skyline at night, Dongmen ancient city gate, Longtan Park, Temple of Confucius, Chengyang Bridge, and a temple at Horse Saddle Mountain (马鞍山)

- Location of Liuzhou City jurisdiction in Guangxi

- Location in China
- Coordinates (Liuzhou government): 24°19′40″N 109°25′40″E
- Country: People's Republic of China
- Region: Guangxi
- Municipal seat: Chengzhong District

Area
  - Prefecture-level city: 18,594.2 km^{2} (7,179.3 sq mi)
  - Urban: 3,559.4 km^{2} (1,374.3 sq mi)
  - Metro: 3,559.4 km^{2} (1,374.3 sq mi)

Population (2024 census)
  - Prefecture-level city: 4,146,000
  - Density: 223.0/km^{2} (577.5/sq mi)
  - Urban: 2,519,051
  - Urban density: 707.72/km^{2} (1,833.0/sq mi)
  - Metro: 2,519,051
  - Metro density: 707.72/km^{2} (1,833.0/sq mi)

GDP
  - Prefecture-level city: CN¥ 305.7 billion US$ 47.4 billion
  - Per capita: CN¥ 73,328; US$ 11,366
- Time zone: UTC+8 (China Standard)
- ISO 3166 code: CN-GX
- Website: www.liuzhou.gov.cn

Liuzhou
- "Liuzhou", as written in Chinese

Chinese name
- Chinese: 柳州
- Hanyu Pinyin: Liǔzhōu
- Postal: Liuchow
- Literal meaning: Willow [River] Prefecture
Transcriptions
Standard Mandarin
- Hanyu Pinyin: Liǔzhōu

Zhuang name
- Zhuang: Liujcouh
- 1957 orthography: Liuзcouƅ

Liuzhou (/ljuːˈdʒoʊ/; Chinese: 柳州, Standard Mandarin: [ljòʊ.ʈʂóʊ], Liuzhou Yue dialect: [liəu^{53} ʦəu^{44}]) is a prefecture-level city in north-central Guangxi Zhuang Autonomous Region, People's Republic of China. The prefecture's population was 4,146,000 as of the 2024 census, including 2,519,051 in the built-up area made of five urban districts. Its total area is 18,594 km^{2} (7,179 sq mi) and 3,559.4 km^{2} (1,374.3 sq mi) for the built-up area.

== Geography ==
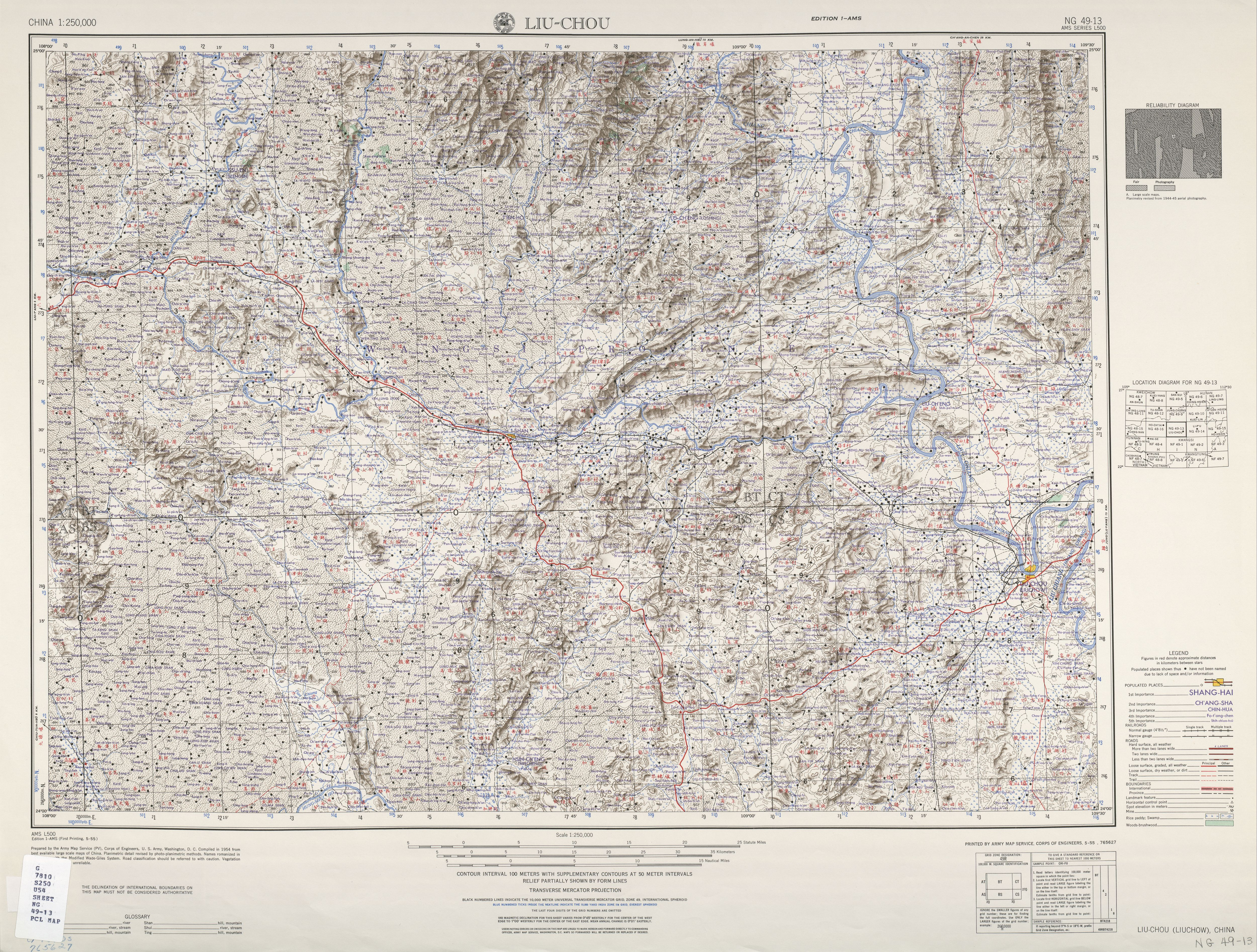
Map including Liuzhou (labeled as LIU-CHOU (LIUCHOW) 柳州) (AMS, 1954)

Liuzhou is located on the banks of the winding Liu River, approximately 255 km (158 mi) from Nanning, the regional capital. By road, it is about 167 km (104 mi) to Guilin, 167 km (104 mi) to Hechi, 237 km (147 mi) to Nanning, 373 km (232 mi) to Fangchenggang, 448 km (278 mi) to Beihai.

Swimming in the river is a tradition of the city. The river is normally green, but sometimes in summer, floods from the mountain areas upstream bring sediment which colors the water yellow. In early 2012, a cadmium spill upstream caused serious pollution worries.

The river can be deep. Normally, the depth is 60–70 metres (200–230 ft) but can as deep as 90 metres (300 ft) before it floods over the wall. In 2000 a bus, with 78 passengers, fell over the side of a bridge. There were no survivors.

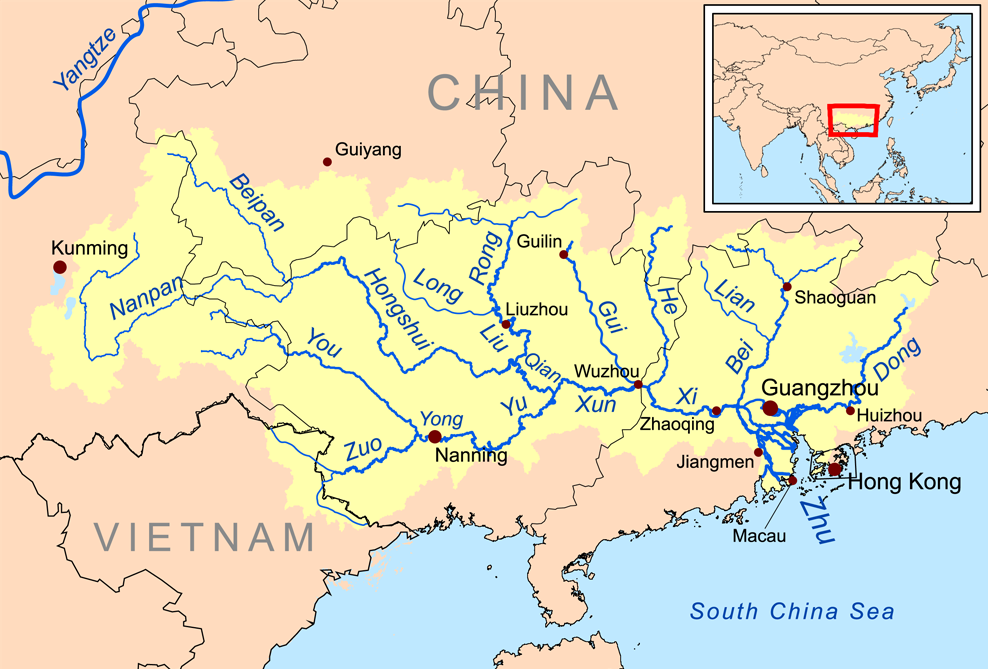
Map of the tributaries of the Pearl River

=== Climate ===
Liuzhou has a humid subtropical climate (Köppen Cfa/Cwa), with mild winters and long hot summers, and very humid conditions year-round. The monthly 24-hour average temperature ranges from 10.5 °C (50.9 °F) in January to 29 °C (84 °F) in August, while extremes have ranged from −3.8 to 42 °C (25 to 108 °F). Rain is both the heaviest and most frequent from May to August, when nearly two-thirds of the annual rainfall occurs.

Climate data for Liuzhou, elevation 97 m (318 ft), (1991–2020 normals, extremes 1951–present)
Month	Jan	Feb	Mar	Apr	May	Jun	Jul	Aug	Sep	Oct	Nov	Dec	Year
Record high °C (°F)	27.8 (82.0)	34.4 (93.9)	34.2 (93.6)	35.9 (96.6)	36.7 (98.1)	38.0 (100.4)	40.1 (104.2)	42.0 (107.6)	38.6 (101.5)	36.0 (96.8)	33.2 (91.8)	29.2 (84.6)	42.0 (107.6)
Mean daily maximum °C (°F)	14.2 (57.6)	16.7 (62.1)	19.4 (66.9)	25.5 (77.9)	29.6 (85.3)	31.7 (89.1)	33.4 (92.1)	33.5 (92.3)	31.9 (89.4)	28.1 (82.6)	22.9 (73.2)	17.4 (63.3)	25.4 (77.6)
Daily mean °C (°F)	10.5 (50.9)	12.9 (55.2)	15.9 (60.6)	21.4 (70.5)	25.3 (77.5)	27.6 (81.7)	29.0 (84.2)	29.0 (84.2)	27.2 (81.0)	23.1 (73.6)	18.1 (64.6)	12.8 (55.0)	21.1 (69.9)
Mean daily minimum °C (°F)	8.2 (46.8)	10.4 (50.7)	13.4 (56.1)	18.7 (65.7)	22.2 (72.0)	24.9 (76.8)	26.1 (79.0)	25.9 (78.6)	24.0 (75.2)	20.0 (68.0)	15.0 (59.0)	10.0 (50.0)	18.2 (64.8)
Record low °C (°F)	−3.8 (25.2)	0.0 (32.0)	2.3 (36.1)	6.7 (44.1)	12.2 (54.0)	17.7 (63.9)	20.0 (68.0)	20.0 (68.0)	15.0 (59.0)	8.3 (46.9)	2.9 (37.2)	−1.1 (30.0)	−3.8 (25.2)
Average precipitation mm (inches)	61.4 (2.42)	43.7 (1.72)	101.8 (4.01)	135.8 (5.35)	241.0 (9.49)	330.8 (13.02)	187.6 (7.39)	174.5 (6.87)	81.5 (3.21)	53.9 (2.12)	58.5 (2.30)	47.9 (1.89)	1,518.4 (59.79)
Average precipitation days	11.7	11.7	16.8	15.9	15.7	17.2	15.0	13.1	8.3	6.0	7.8	8.0	147.2
Average snowy days	0.4	0.1	0	0	0	0	0	0	0	0	0	0.1	0.6
Average relative humidity (%)	72	73	78	76	75	78	74	73	69	66	68	66	72
Mean monthly sunshine hours	62.7	53.5	47.8	79.1	117.1	127.3	190.6	191.8	181.2	170.4	130.0	111.1	1,462.6
Percentage possible sunshine	19	17	13	21	28	31	46	48	50	48	40	34	33
Source 1: China Meteorological Administration all-time extreme temperature
Source 2: Weather China

== History ==
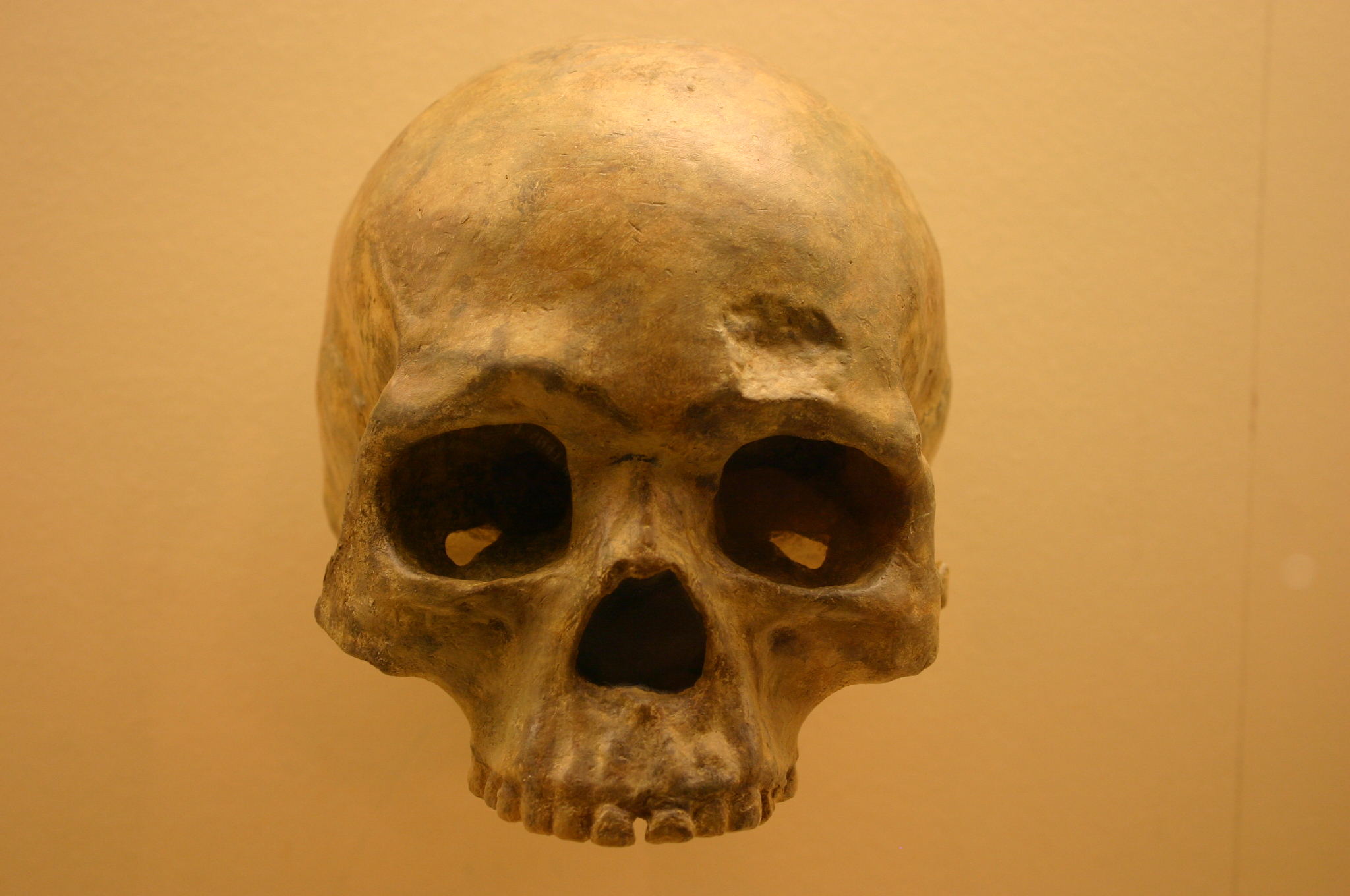
Liujiang cave skull from the National Museum of Natural History

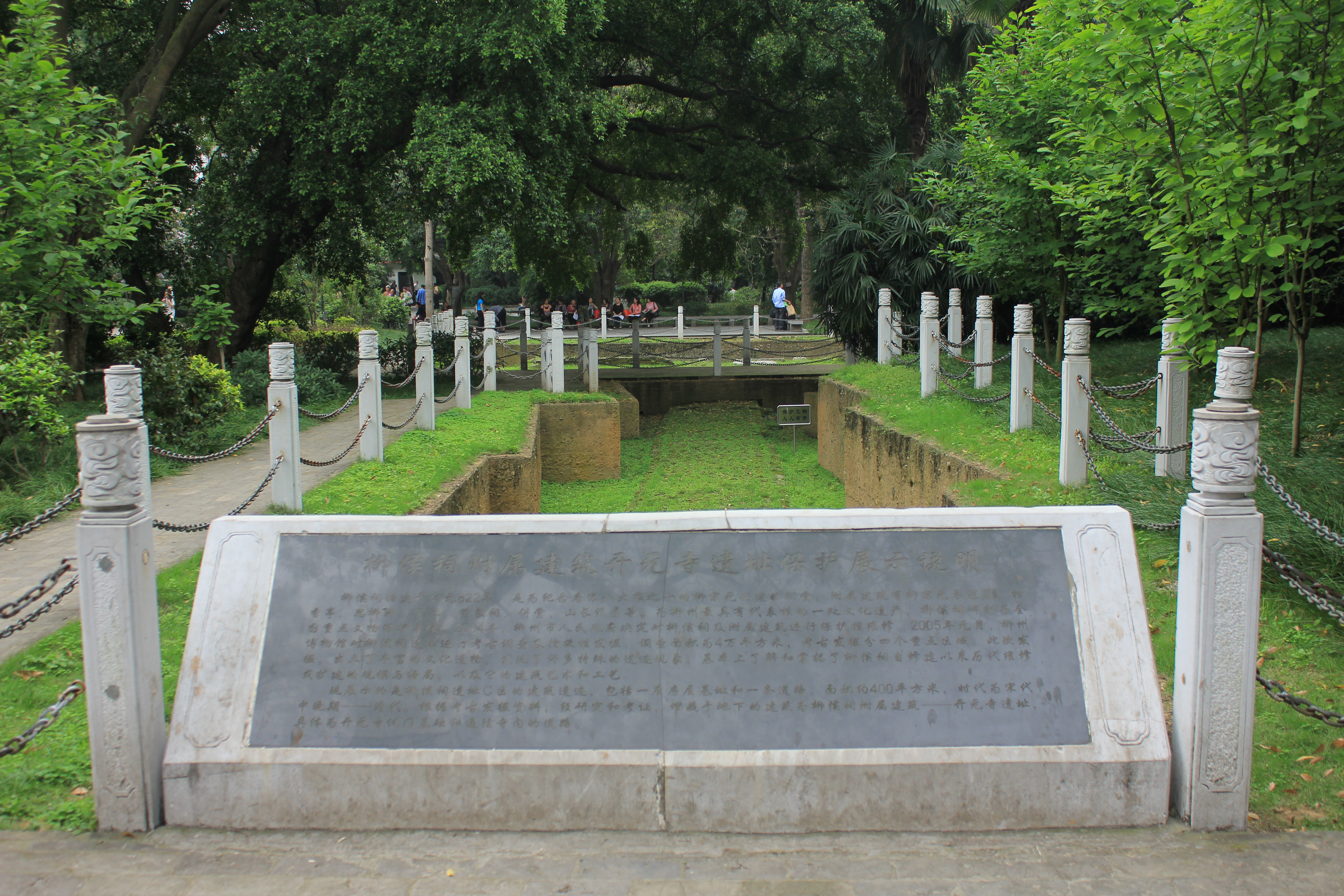
Kaiyuan Temple (开元寺, ruins of Tang dynasty

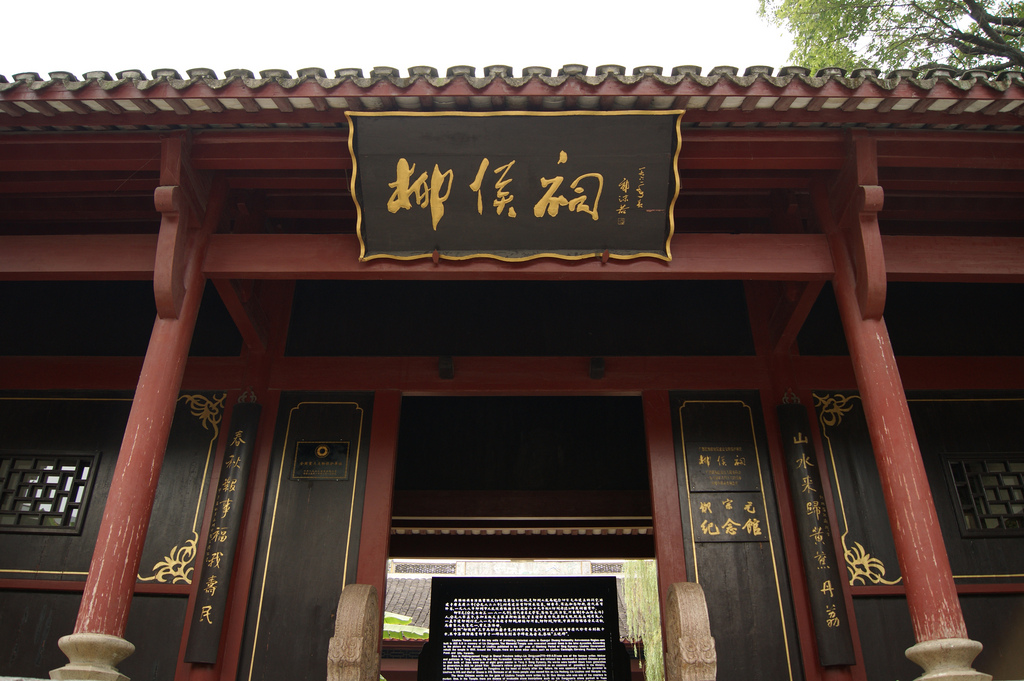
Liuhou Ancestral Hall 柳侯祠, "Ancestral Hall of Liu Noble"

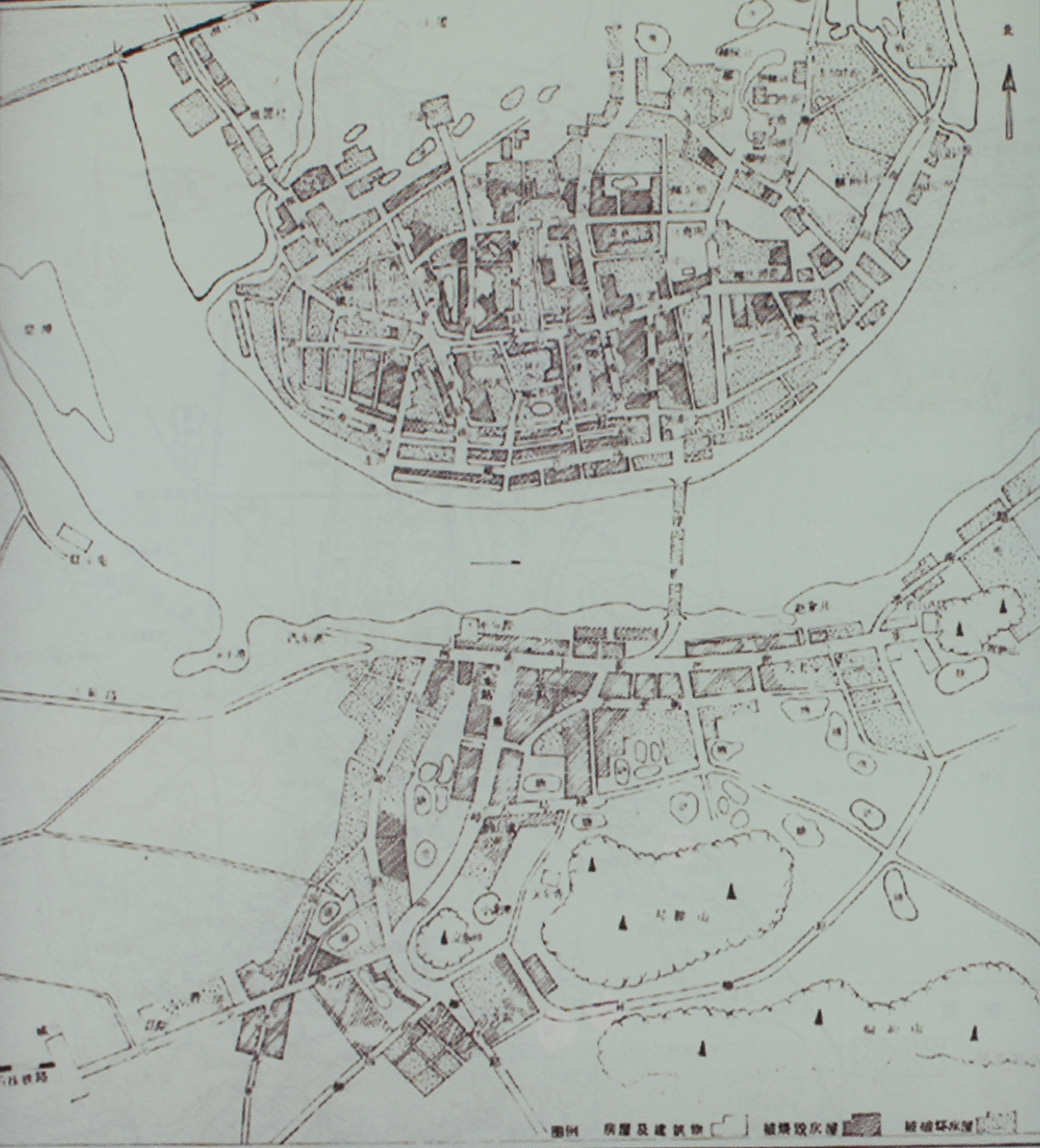
Liuzhou by Japanese Army Situation Map

The Liujiang men (Chinese: 柳江人) are among the earliest modern humans found in East Asia. Their remains were discovered in the Tongtianyang Cave (通天岩) in Liujiang County, Guangxi. Liujiang man is a Late Pleistocene Homo sapiens sapiens.

Liuzhou has a history of more than 2,100 years. The city was founded in 111 B.C. when it was known as Tanzhong (潭中; 'Center of Deep Pool').

In 742 A.D. it became known as Longcheng (龙城; 'Dragon City'), after the Long River, before finally changing to Liuzhou (柳州; 'Willow Prefecture') after the Liu River in 1736.

The most famous historic figure is Liu Zongyuan (773–819), who was a poet and politician in the Tang dynasty and who died in Liuzhou. He is commemorated by a park in the city.

Liuzhou was the site of Liuchow Airfield, used by Nationalist Chinese and American Army Air Forces in World War II. (At that time the airfield was closer to the centre, where the zoo is now.) It was captured by the Japanese army on 7 November 1944 during the Battle of Guilin–Liuzhou and recaptured by Nationalist Chinese forces on 30 June 1945 prior to the Second Guangxi Campaign.

== Administrative divisions ==
Liuzhou has direct administration over 10 county-level divisions: 5 districts, 3 counties and 2 autonomous counties:

- District:
  - Chengzhong District
  - Liunan District
  - Liubei District
  - Yufeng District
  - Liujiang District
- County:
  - Liucheng County
  - Luzhai County
  - Rong'an County
- Autonomous county:
  - Rongshui Miao Autonomous County
  - Sanjiang Dong Autonomous County

Map
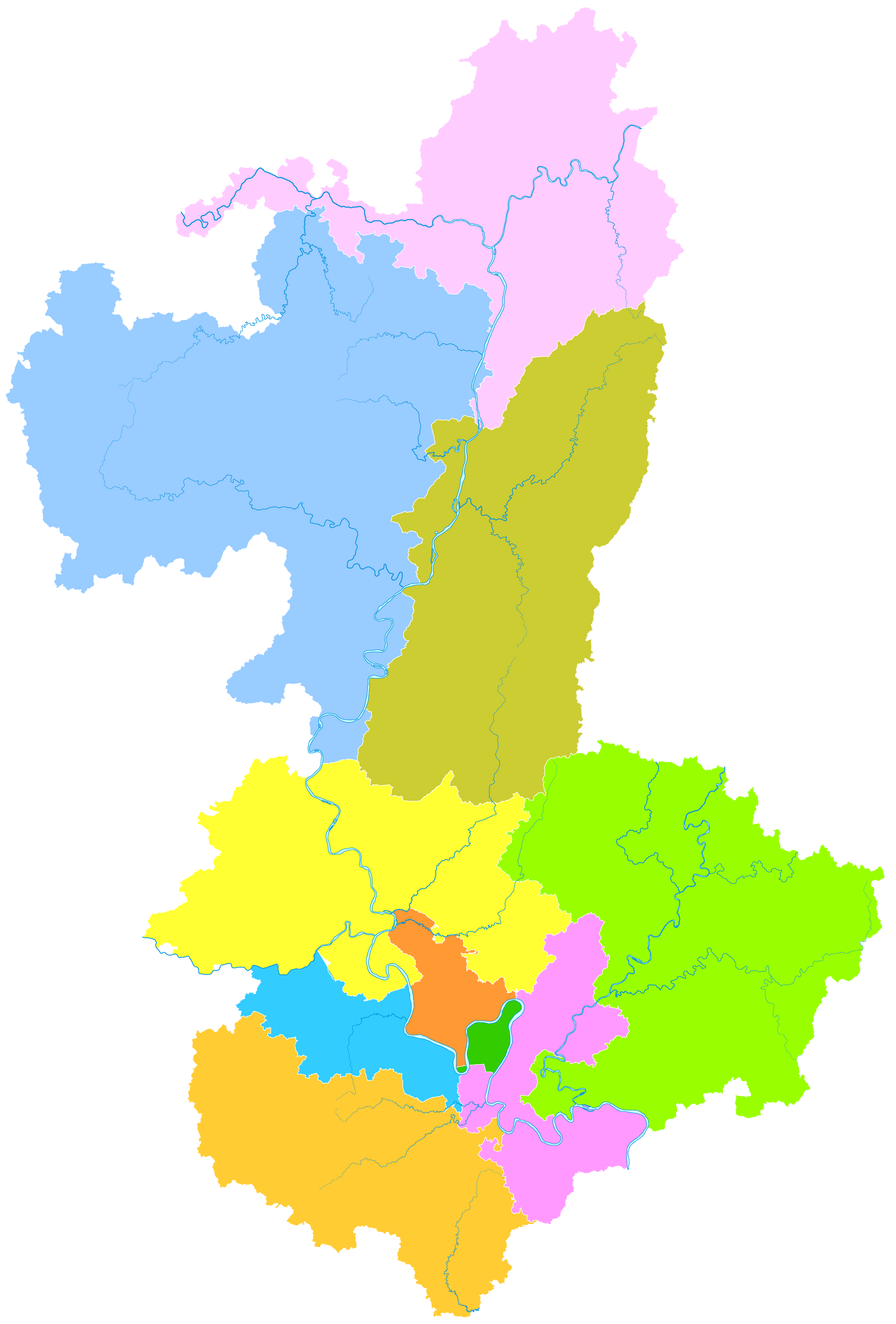

== Economy ==
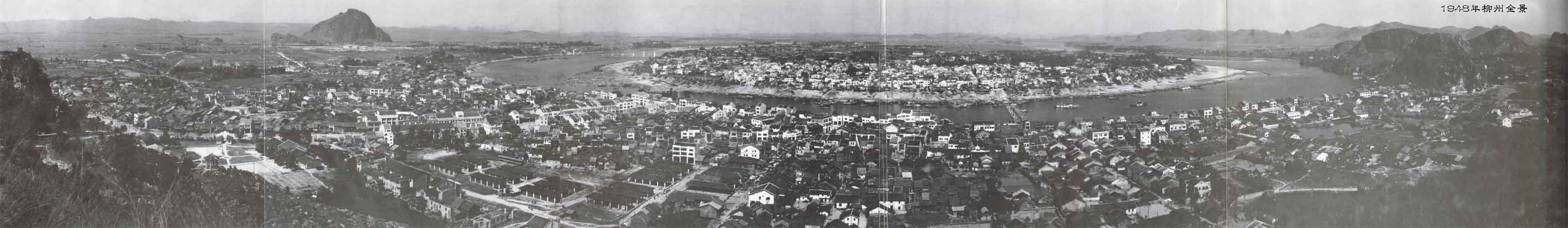
Liuzhou city center in 1948

Liuzhou is the second largest city in Guangxi and is the region's industrial center. According to statistics issued by the Liuzhou government in 2015, the city's GDP was 231.1 billion yuan.

Among important companies based in Liuzhou are:

- LiuGong - a multinational construction machinery manufacturer
- SAIC-GM-Wuling Automobile - a joint venture between General Motors, SAIC Motor and Liuzhou Wuling Motors

== Tourism ==
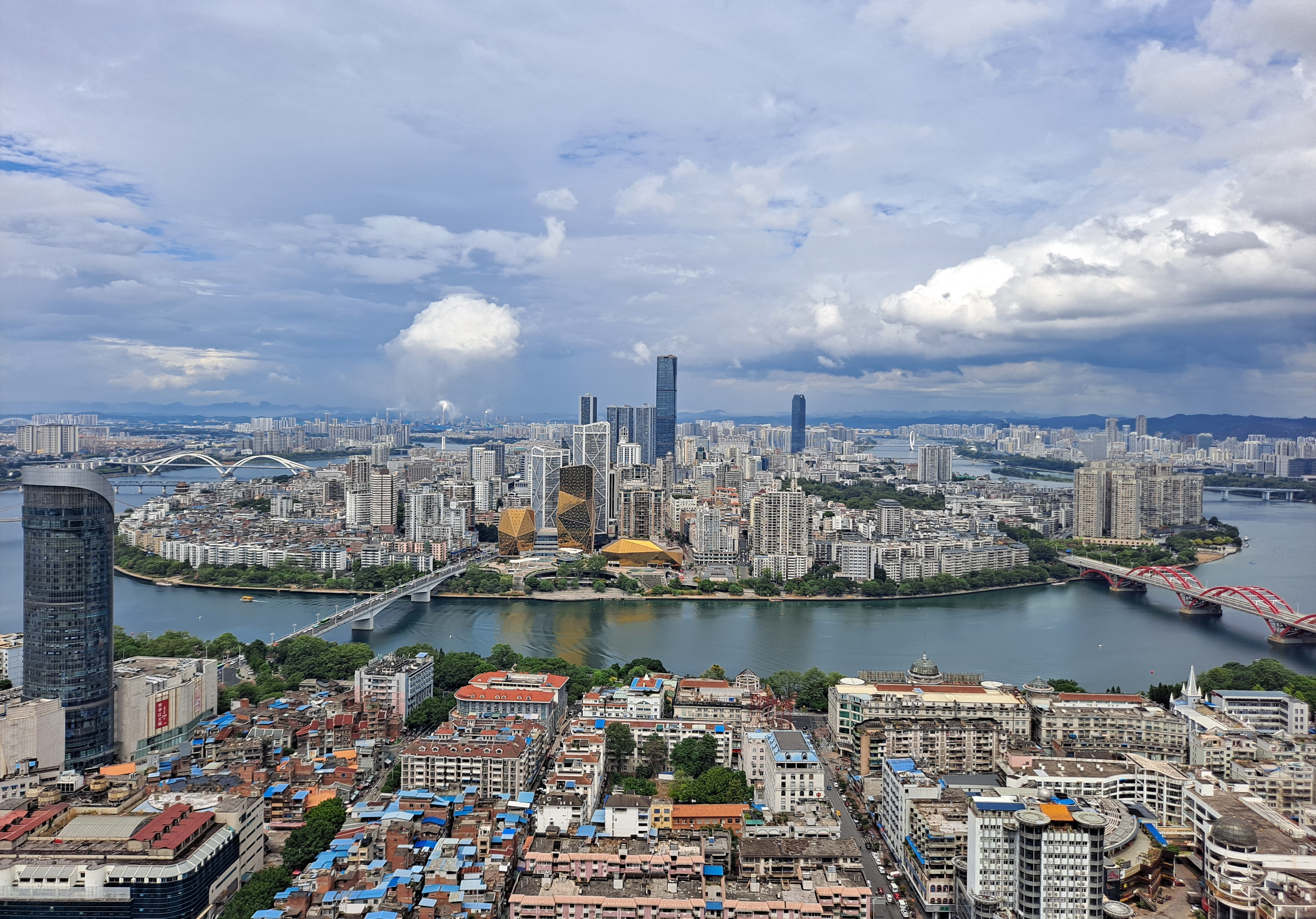
Liuzhou city seen from Ma'an Mountain in 2022

As with much of Guangxi, the landscape around Liuzhou is a mix of rolling hills, mountain peaks, caves and karst scenery. It is an ideal base for exploring the minority villages in the area.

- Rongshui: Rongshui Miao Autonomous County is located in the north of Liuzhou prefecture, 118 km (73 mi) away from Liuzhou and 168 km (104 mi) from Guilin. The territory is inhabited by Miao, Yao, Dong, Zhuang and Han ethnic groups.
- Dayaoshan scenic area is in Jinxiu Yao Autonomous County, 154 km (96 mi) from the city of Liuzhou. It has a scenic area of over 500 km^{2} (190 sq mi).
- Sanjiang: Sanjiang Dong Autonomous County lies to the north of Liuzhou near the Hunan border. It is a Dong minority area and is surrounded by picturesque ethnic minority villages.
- LiuZhou Industrial Museum (柳州工业博物馆) was set up on the original site of the former Cotton Textile Factory No.3, and opened in 2012.

In recent years (post-COVID-19 pandemic, 2022/3) some tourists engage in culinary tourism since Liuzhou is the birthplace of Guangxi's most famous dish, Luosifen.

== Transport ==
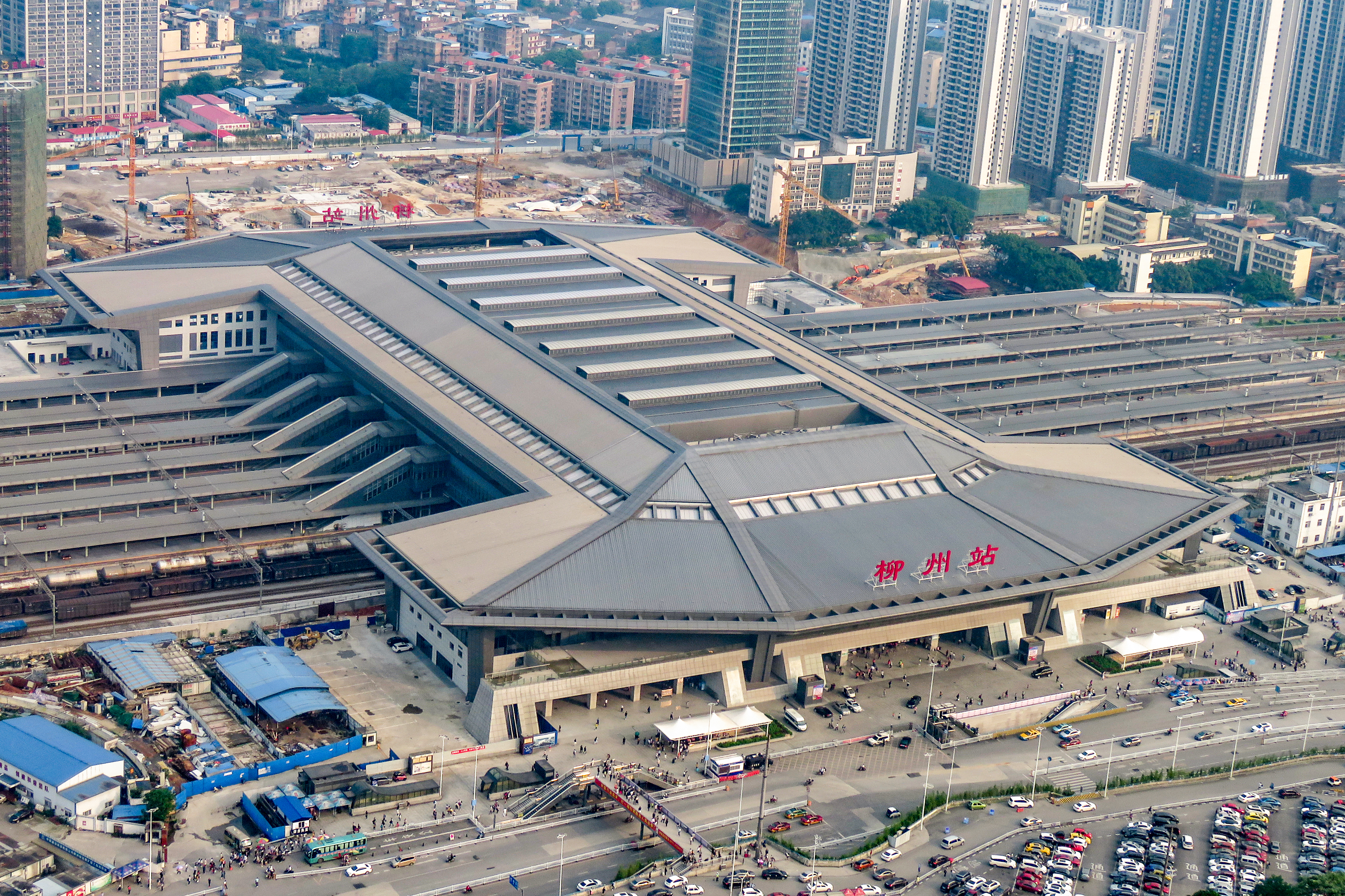
Liuzhou railway station

- Liuzhou Bailian Airport provides flights to major cities in China.
- Liuzhou has extensive rail connections with the rest of China. Hunan-Guangxi Railway (Hengyang - Pingxiang, a.k.a. Xiang-Gui Line), Jiaozuo-Liuzhou Railway (Jiaozuo - Zhicheng - Liuzhou, a.k.a. Jiao-Liu Line) Railway and Guizhou-Guangxi Railway (Guiyang - Liuzhou, a.k.a. Qian-Gui Line) make Liuzhou the center of freight transportation in Guangxi.
- China National Highway 209
- Liuzhou-Wuzhou Railway is a newly released railway line, linking the cities of Liuzhou with Wuzhou.

== Military ==
Liuzhou is the headquarters of the 75th Group Army of the People's Liberation Army.

== Quotes ==
Liuzhou appears in the Chinese saying 生在苏州, 活在杭州, 吃在广州, 死在柳州.

Born in Suzhou, live in Hangzhou, eat in Guangzhou, die in Liuzhou

because, in the past, the city was known for its coffins, made from firwood, camphor wood, and sandalwood, which are said to preserve the body after death. Guangzhou's "Cantonese" cuisine is famous worldwide, and Hangzhou is known for its prosperity and the beauty of its location. Suzhou is reputed to have the most beautiful people in China, so the line is sometimes given as "Marry in Suzhou...".

Today many tourists buy miniature coffins, about 3 to 30 cm (1.2 to 11.8 in) long, as souvenirs or good luck charms. The coffins are usually inscribed 升官发财 (shēng guān fā cái) which means 'get promotion and get rich". The second and fourth characters are homophones of 棺材 (guāncái) meaning 'coffin'.

Some miniature coffins are used as caskets to hold the ashes of ancestors.

== Notable people ==
- Liuzhou was the home of Li Ning (born 1963), gymnast and entrepreneur who lit the Olympic torch in Beijing in 2008.
- Chinese gymnast, Jiang Yuyuan.

== See also ==
- List of twin towns and sister cities in China
