= Rong Jiang =

Rong Jiang may refer to:

- Rong River, a river in Guangxi, China
- Jiang Rong (sport shooter) (born 1961), Chinese sport shooter whose surname is Jiang
- Jiang Rong (born 1946), pen name of Chinese writer Lü Jiamin
