= Long River (Guangxi) =

Coordinates: 24°32′13″N 109°15′1″E

Long Jiang
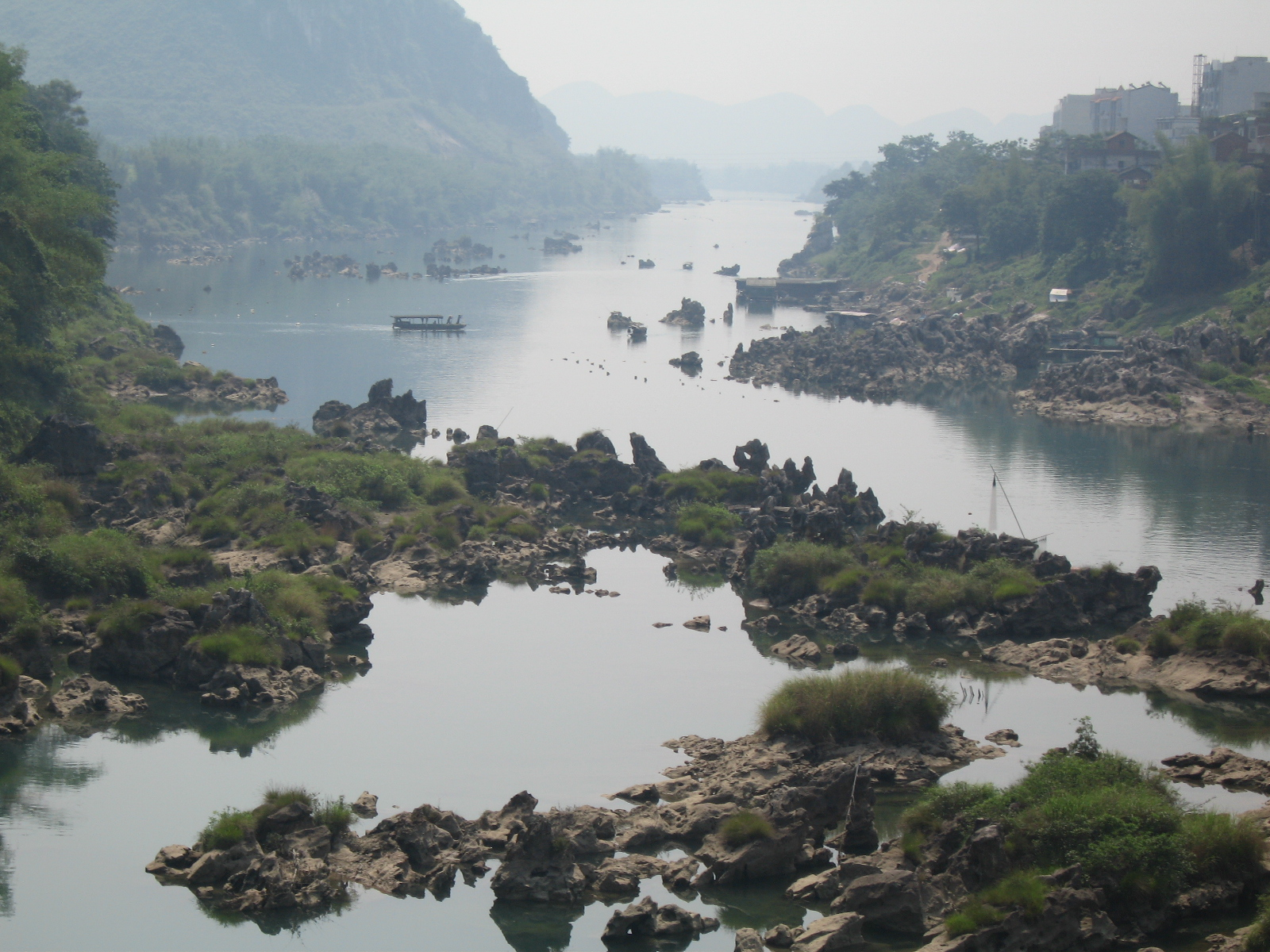
- The Long River at Yizhou

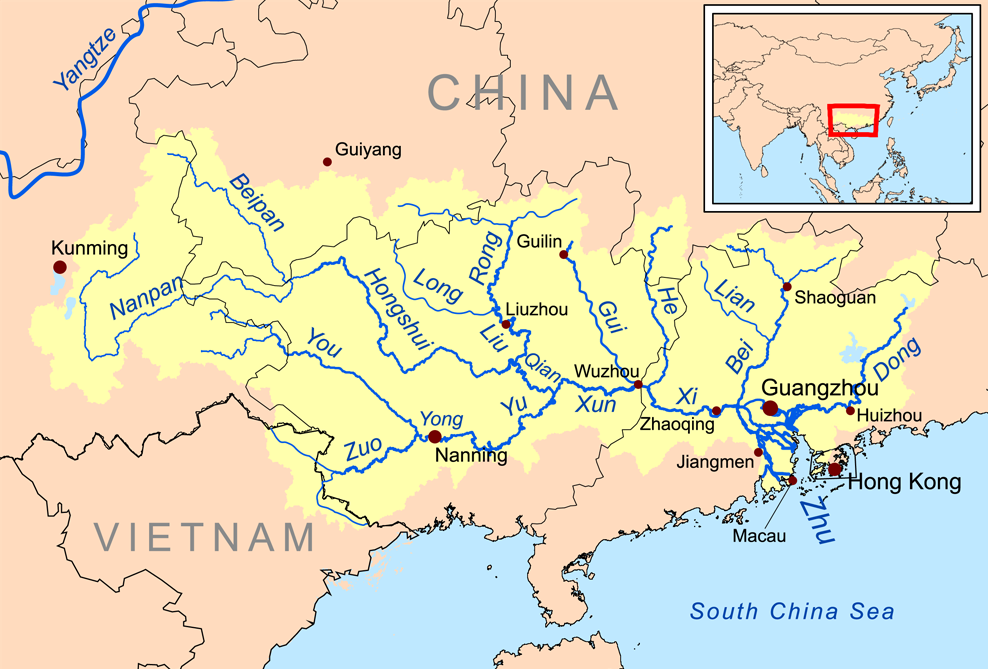
- Map of the Pearl River system

Location
- Country: China

Physical characteristics
- Source
  - location: Biandou, Sandu Shui Autonomous County, Guizhou
- Mouth
  - location: Nandan, Liucheng County, Guangxi
- Length: 367 km (228 mi)
- Basin size: 16,878 km^{2} (6,517 sq mi)

The Long River (Chinese: 龙江, pinyin: Lóng Jiāng, literally: Dragon River) is a river system in northern Guangxi Province, China. It is a part of the larger Pearl River system by way of the Liu, Qian, Xun, and Xi Rivers. Its true source is in Sandu Shui Autonomous County, Guizhou, where it is known as the Dagou He (Chinese: 打狗河). It becomes the Jincheng Jiang (Chinese: 金城江) after entering Guangxi and passes through Hechi. After joining with its left tributary, the Xiaohuan Jiang, it becomes known as the Long Jiang. It then passes through Yizhou before meeting with the Rong Jiang to become the Liu.

The Long is famous for its natural scenery and scenes from the film, The Painted Veil, were filmed along its course.
