= Rongshui =

Rongshui may refer to the following locations in China:

- Rongshui Miao Autonomous County (融水苗族自治县), Liuzhou, Guangxi
  - Rongshui Town (融水镇), town in and seat of Rongshui County
- Rong River, tributary of the Pearl River in Guangxi
