= Liujiang District =

Liujiang 柳江区 · Liujgyangh Gih
- District
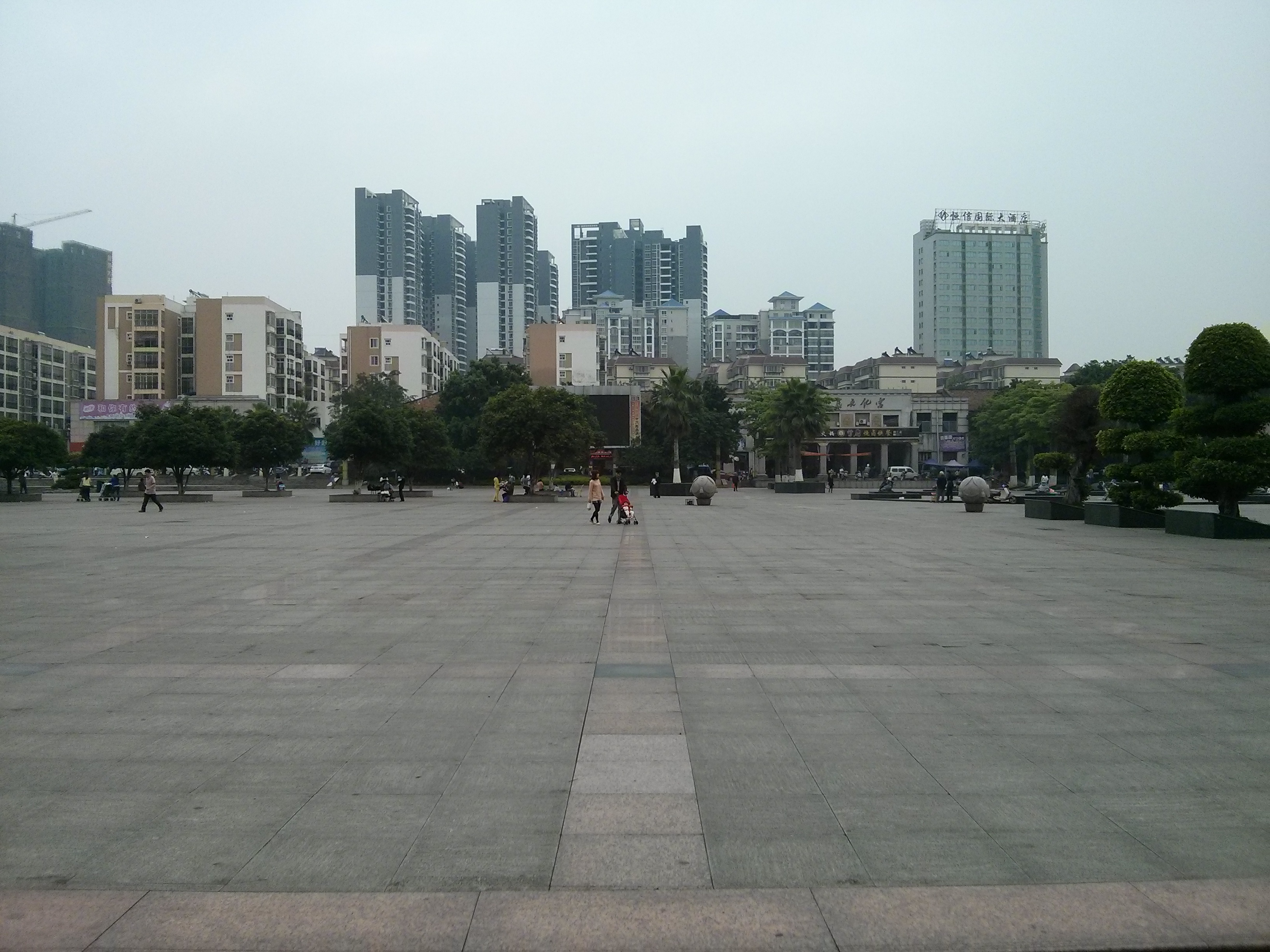

- Location in Guangxi
- Coordinates: 24°15′25″N 109°20′13″E
- Country: China
- Autonomous region: Guangxi
- Prefecture-level city: Liuzhou
- District seat: Labao (拉堡镇)

Area
  - Total: 2,504 km^{2} (967 sq mi)
- Elevation: 110 m (360 ft)

Population (2010)
  - Total: 562,351
  - Density: 224.6/km^{2} (581.7/sq mi)
- Time zone: UTC+8 (China Standard)
- Postal code: 5451XX

Liujiang District (simplified Chinese: 柳江区; traditional Chinese: 柳江區; pinyin: Liǔjiāng Qū; Standard Zhuang: Liujgyangh Gih) is under the administration of Liuzhou, Guangxi Zhuang Autonomous Region, China, located on the southwest bank of the Liu River. It covers a land area of 2,504 square kilometres (967 sq mi) and had a population of 562,351 as of 2010. The southernmost county-level division of Liuzhou City, it lies south of Liuzhou's city proper, bordering the prefecture-level cities of Laibin to the south and Hechi to the northwest.

== Administrative divisions ==
Liujiang consists of 8 towns:

- Labao (拉堡镇)
- Baipeng (百朋镇)
- Chengtuan (成团镇)
- Sandu (三都镇)
- Ligao (里高镇)
- Jiangde (进德镇)
- Chuanshan (穿山镇)
- Shibo (土博镇)

== Transportation ==
=== Rail ===
- Guizhou–Guangxi Railway
- Liuzhou-Wuzhou Railway

== Liujiang hominid ==
These findings might give some support to the claim that modern humans from Africa arrived at southern China about 100,000 years BP (Zhiren Cave, Chongzuo City: 100,000 years BP; and the Liujiang hominid: controversially dated at 139,000–111,000 years BP).

== Climate ==
Climate data for Liujiang, elevation 134 m (440 ft), (1991–2020 normals, extremes 1981–present)
Month	Jan	Feb	Mar	Apr	May	Jun	Jul	Aug	Sep	Oct	Nov	Dec	Year
Record high °C (°F)	28.3 (82.9)	33.2 (91.8)	34.5 (94.1)	36.1 (97.0)	36.4 (97.5)	36.7 (98.1)	39 (102)	38.9 (102.0)	38.1 (100.6)	36.3 (97.3)	33 (91)	29.9 (85.8)	39 (102)
Mean daily maximum °C (°F)	14.3 (57.7)	16.7 (62.1)	19.6 (67.3)	25.4 (77.7)	29.5 (85.1)	31.5 (88.7)	33.1 (91.6)	33.4 (92.1)	31.8 (89.2)	27.8 (82.0)	22.9 (73.2)	17.3 (63.1)	25.3 (77.5)
Daily mean °C (°F)	10.6 (51.1)	12.9 (55.2)	16.0 (60.8)	21.4 (70.5)	25.2 (77.4)	27.3 (81.1)	28.5 (83.3)	28.6 (83.5)	26.9 (80.4)	22.8 (73.0)	17.8 (64.0)	12.6 (54.7)	20.9 (69.6)
Mean daily minimum °C (°F)	8.0 (46.4)	10.2 (50.4)	13.4 (56.1)	18.4 (65.1)	22.0 (71.6)	24.5 (76.1)	25.3 (77.5)	25.2 (77.4)	23.3 (73.9)	19.2 (66.6)	14.4 (57.9)	9.5 (49.1)	17.8 (64.0)
Record low °C (°F)	−0.5 (31.1)	0.2 (32.4)	0.9 (33.6)	7.8 (46.0)	12.2 (54.0)	16.5 (61.7)	19.5 (67.1)	20.3 (68.5)	7.8 (46.0)	8.1 (46.6)	3.2 (37.8)	−1.6 (29.1)	−1.6 (29.1)
Average precipitation mm (inches)	63.5 (2.50)	44.2 (1.74)	98.7 (3.89)	129.1 (5.08)	217.9 (8.58)	339.0 (13.35)	212.3 (8.36)	197.4 (7.77)	82.9 (3.26)	57.5 (2.26)	56.7 (2.23)	44.6 (1.76)	1,543.8 (60.78)
Average precipitation days (≥ 0.1 mm)	11.6	11.7	17.1	15.5	15.6	17.7	15.4	13.6	8.5	6.4	7.7	8.1	148.9
Average snowy days	0.2	0.1	0	0	0	0	0	0	0	0	0	0.1	0.4
Average relative humidity (%)	75	76	80	79	78	82	80	79	74	70	71	70	76
Mean monthly sunshine hours	58.6	50.1	46.4	77.4	116.7	121.1	176.8	180.2	174.5	160.1	127.8	107.1	1,396.8
Percentage possible sunshine	17	16	12	20	28	30	43	45	48	45	39	33	31
Source: China Meteorological Administration
