= Liuzhou–Wuzhou railway =

Rail line in China

Liuzhou-Wuzhou Railway 柳梧铁路

Overview
- Status: Active
- Termini: Liuzhou; Wuzhou
- Stations: 10

Service
- Type: Heavy rail
- Operator(s): Liunan Railway Corporation

Technical
- Line length: 239 km (149 mi)

The Liuzhou–Wuzhou Railway (Chinese: 柳梧铁路) is a Chinese rail line. It connects Liuzhou City of the Liujiang District, to Wuzhou. It was designed to support speeds of 160 km/h (99 mph) and reserved conditions for speeds of up to of 200 km/h (120 mph) and double-stack container rail transport. The line covers a total distance of 238.7 km (148.3 mi). The main roadbed covers approximately 97 km (60 mi), accounting for 41% of its length. The railway line crosses 114 large and middle-sized bridges and 93.06 km (57.82 mi) of tunnels. It cost 19.6 billion yuan ($3.2 billion), including a capital fund of 9.8 billion yuan with a four year completion schedule.

During testing, the project aimed to improve capacity, ease existing congestion, and encourage construction and development of Guangxi, which connects the Greater Bay Area of Guangdong–Hong Kong–Macao.

A major station of the railway network in the Guangdong–Hong Kong–Macao Greater Bay Area. The project is owned and initiated by the Liunan Railway Corporation.

== Route ==
The line passes through ten stations; two overpass stations and eight intermediate stations. From Jinde Station it crosses Quannan Expressway to the southeast through Chuanshan Town and Shilong Town. Traveling on the west side of the expressway, it passes through the north side of Huangmao Township, to Wuxuan Station in the north of Ertang Town. After leaving the Wuxuan station, the line runs southeast, reaching Dongxiang Station on the north side of Dongxiang. Then the line enters the Scenic Area of Guiping Xishan, passing through Zijing Town and the north side of Jintian Town. Going towards the northeast, the line crosses Wangwu Station on the south side of Wangwu Village, then crossing the Baomao Expressway while turning to the northeast.
