= Sanhe Subdistrict, Sandu County =

Sanhe Subdistrict 三合街道
- Subdistrict
- Location in China
- Coordinates: 25°59′20″N 107°52′24″E
- Country: People's Republic of China
- Province: Guizhou
- Autonomous prefecture: Qiannan
- Autonomous county: Sandu
- Village-level divisions: 5 residential communities 5 villages
- Elevation: 395 m (1,296 ft)
- Time zone: UTC+8 (China Standard)
- Postal code: 558100
- Area code: 0854

Sanhe Subdistrict (Chinese: 三合街道; pinyin: Sānhé Jiēdào) is a subdistrict in and the seat of Sandu Shui Autonomous County in southeastern Guizhou province, China. As of 2018, it has 5 residential communities (社区) and 5 villages under its administration.

== See also ==
- List of township-level divisions of Guizhou
