= Sandu Shui Autonomous County =

Sandu County 三都县 · Sanyduy xianq
- Autonomous county
- 三都水族自治县; Sanyduy Suijzuf Ziqziqxianq; Sandu Shui Autonomous County
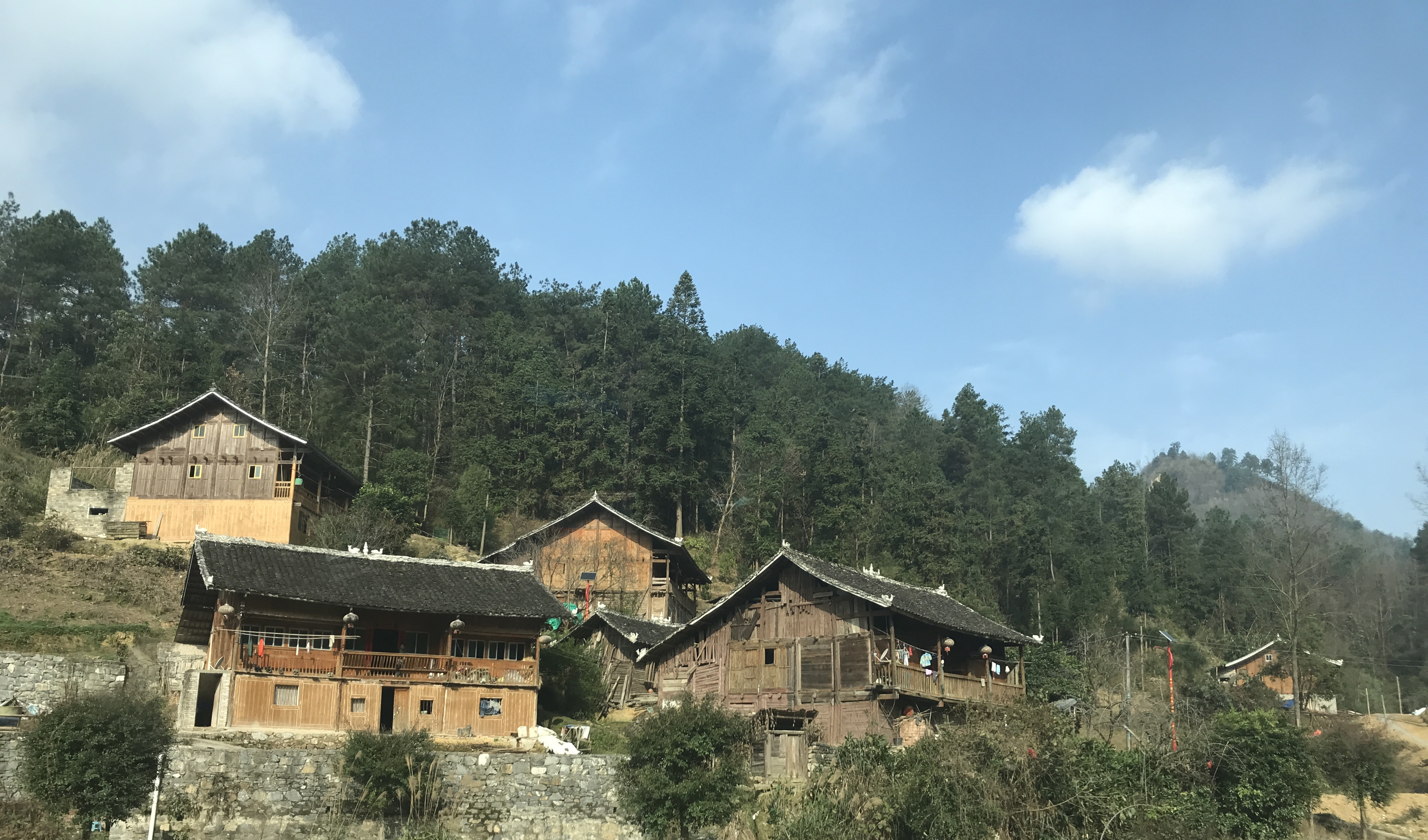
- Shui ethnic houses

- Location of the seat in Guizhou Sandu (Southwest China)
- Coordinates (Sandu County government): 25°59′01″N 107°52′10″E
- Country: China
- Province: Guizhou
- Autonomous prefecture: Qiannan
- County seat: Sanhe Subdistrict

Area
  - Autonomous county: 2,384 km^{2} (920 sq mi)
- Elevation: 675 m (2,215 ft)
- Highest elevation (Gengding Mountain): 1,665.5 m (5,464 ft)
- Lowest elevation (Duliu River): 303 m (994 ft)

Population (2020 census)
  - Autonomous county: 276,347
  - Density: 115.9/km^{2} (300.2/sq mi)
  - Urban: 177,882
  - Ethnic minorities: 367,100
  - Shui people: 261,300
- Time zone: UTC+8 (China Standard)
- Postal code: 558100
- Area code: 0854
- Website: www.sandu.gov.cn

Sandu Shui Autonomous County (Chinese: 三都水族自治县; pinyin: Sāndū Shuǐzú Zìzhìxiàn; Bouyei: Sanyduy Suijzuf Ziqziqxianq) is an autonomous county in the southeast of Guizhou province, China. It is under the administration of the Qiannan Buyei and Miao Autonomous Prefecture, and the only Shui Autonomous County in China; 63% of Shui in China live in this county, which is the heartland of the Shui people. Per a 2022 county government publication, Sandu has a population of 381,000, 97% of whom belong to ethnic minorities, and 67% of the total population are Shui.

It is one of the poorest counties of Guizhou. Most of the county is forested and it is noted for its clean air.

== Administrative divisions ==
Sandu administers the following two subdistricts and six towns:

- Sanhe Subdistrict (Chinese: 三合街道);
- Fengyu Subdistrict (Chinese: 凤羽街道);
- Dahe (Chinese: 大河镇);
- Pu'an (Chinese: 普安镇);
- Dujiang (Chinese: 都江镇);
- Zhonghe (Chinese: 中和镇);
- Zhouqin (Chinese: 周覃镇);
- Jiuqian (Chinese: 九阡镇).

== Geography ==
Sandu County's urban center is located 68 kilometres (42 mi) from Duyun, the administrative center of the Qiannan Buyei and Miao Autonomous Prefecture, and 177 kilometres (110 mi) from the provincial capital of Guiyang.

All of Sandu belongs to the watershed of the Liu River which flows into the Pearl River. The Duliu River has its source in Sandu and flows into the Liu River. The county is rather mountainous with Karst landscape resulting in large locale temperature and climate differences. Antimony is mined commercially in Sandu.

=== Climate ===
Climate data for Sandu, elevation 448 m (1,470 ft), (1991–2020 normals, extremes 1981–present)
Month	Jan	Feb	Mar	Apr	May	Jun	Jul	Aug	Sep	Oct	Nov	Dec	Year
Record high °C (°F)	25.8 (78.4)	32.3 (90.1)	36.1 (97.0)	37.1 (98.8)	36.4 (97.5)	37.5 (99.5)	39.2 (102.6)	38.8 (101.8)	38.4 (101.1)	35.7 (96.3)	32.0 (89.6)	28.1 (82.6)	39.2 (102.6)
Mean daily maximum °C (°F)	11.8 (53.2)	15.1 (59.2)	19.0 (66.2)	24.6 (76.3)	28.0 (82.4)	30.2 (86.4)	32.2 (90.0)	32.6 (90.7)	30.0 (86.0)	24.7 (76.5)	20.4 (68.7)	14.8 (58.6)	23.6 (74.5)
Daily mean °C (°F)	7.9 (46.2)	10.6 (51.1)	14.1 (57.4)	19.2 (66.6)	22.7 (72.9)	25.2 (77.4)	26.7 (80.1)	26.3 (79.3)	23.8 (74.8)	19.3 (66.7)	14.8 (58.6)	9.8 (49.6)	18.4 (65.1)
Mean daily minimum °C (°F)	5.5 (41.9)	7.7 (45.9)	11.1 (52.0)	15.7 (60.3)	19.2 (66.6)	22.2 (72.0)	23.4 (74.1)	22.8 (73.0)	20.2 (68.4)	16.1 (61.0)	11.6 (52.9)	6.9 (44.4)	15.2 (59.4)
Record low °C (°F)	−2.9 (26.8)	−1.9 (28.6)	−0.5 (31.1)	5.7 (42.3)	7.2 (45.0)	12.5 (54.5)	15.4 (59.7)	17.1 (62.8)	11.9 (53.4)	6.4 (43.5)	0.3 (32.5)	−3.5 (25.7)	−3.5 (25.7)
Average precipitation mm (inches)	37.0 (1.46)	36.9 (1.45)	69.7 (2.74)	118.7 (4.67)	205.1 (8.07)	278.8 (10.98)	224.5 (8.84)	162.1 (6.38)	90.5 (3.56)	76.9 (3.03)	47.3 (1.86)	27.4 (1.08)	1,374.9 (54.12)
Average precipitation days (≥ 0.1 mm)	13.2	11.7	16.0	16.7	18.1	18.3	17.1	15.1	10.6	11.7	9.8	9.7	168
Average snowy days	1.9	0.7	0.1	0	0	0	0	0	0	0	0	0.5	3.2
Average relative humidity (%)	78	76	78	78	80	83	82	81	80	81	79	76	79
Mean monthly sunshine hours	34.0	48.8	62.5	87.6	103.2	87.0	139.1	161.6	129.0	90.3	82.8	63.0	1,088.9
Percentage possible sunshine	10	15	17	23	25	21	33	40	35	25	26	19	24
Source: China Meteorological Administration

== Demographics ==
As of 2021, Sandu Shui Autonomous County has a registered hukou population of 380,871, of which, 96,869 belong to urban areas, and the remaining 284,002 belong to rural areas, giving the autonomous county an urbanization rate of 25.43%.

Per a 2022 county government publication, 67% of the autonomous county's population is ethnically Shui, another 30% belong to other recognized ethnic minorities, and just 3% of the population is ethnically Han Chinese.

The average annual disposable income for urban residents as of 2021 totaled 35,874 renminbi (RMB), a 9% increase from the previous year, and the second highest among county-level divisions in the Qiannan Buyei and Miao Autonomous Prefecture.

== Transport ==
Sandu is served by the Guiyang–Guangzhou high-speed railway, with a travel time of 50 minutes to Guiyang. It is also connected by G76 Xiamen–Chengdu Expressway and several provincial expressways.
