= Liu River =

Coordinates: 23°48′9″N 109°31′59″E

Liu Jiang
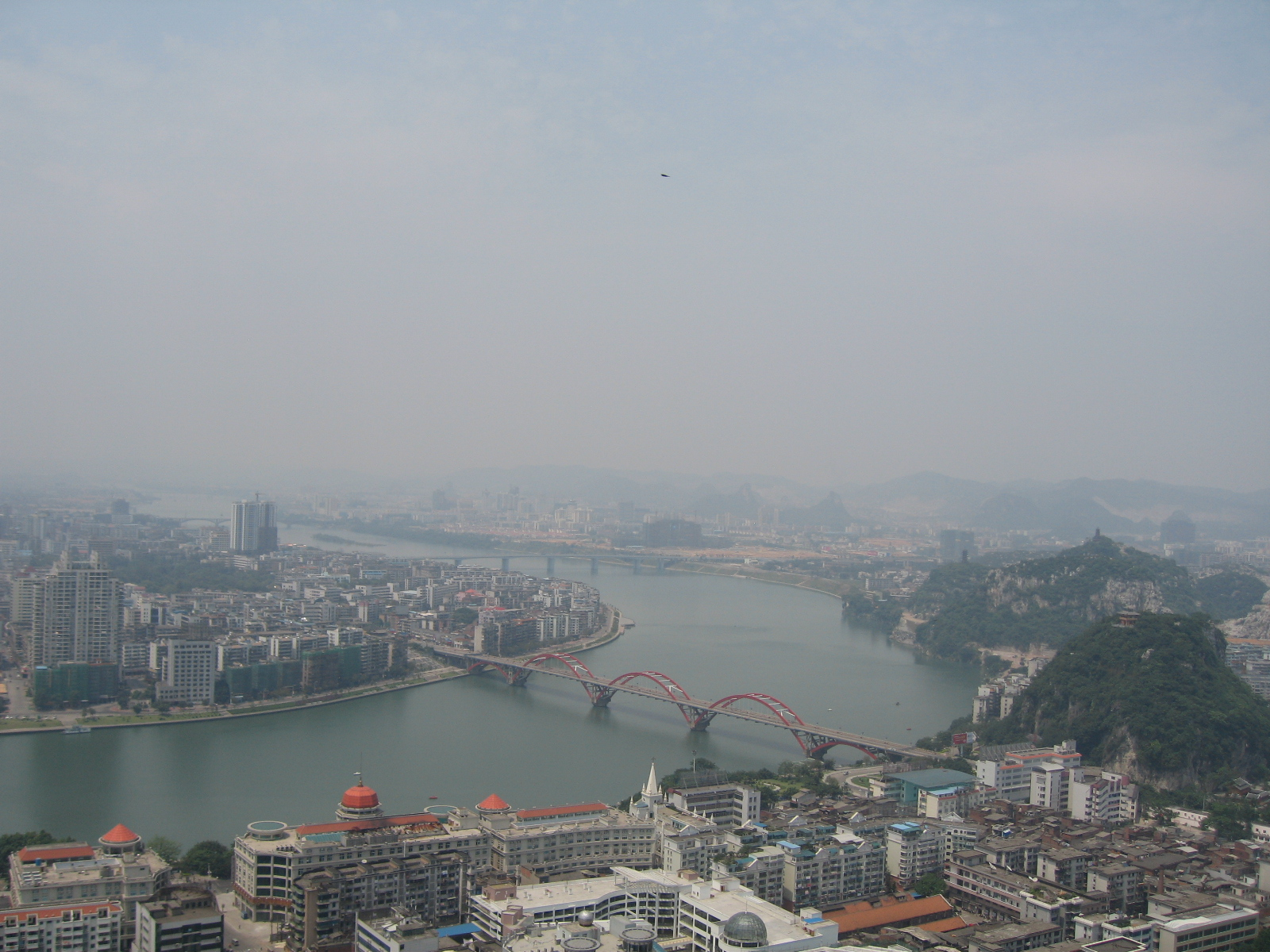
- The Liu River at Liuzhou

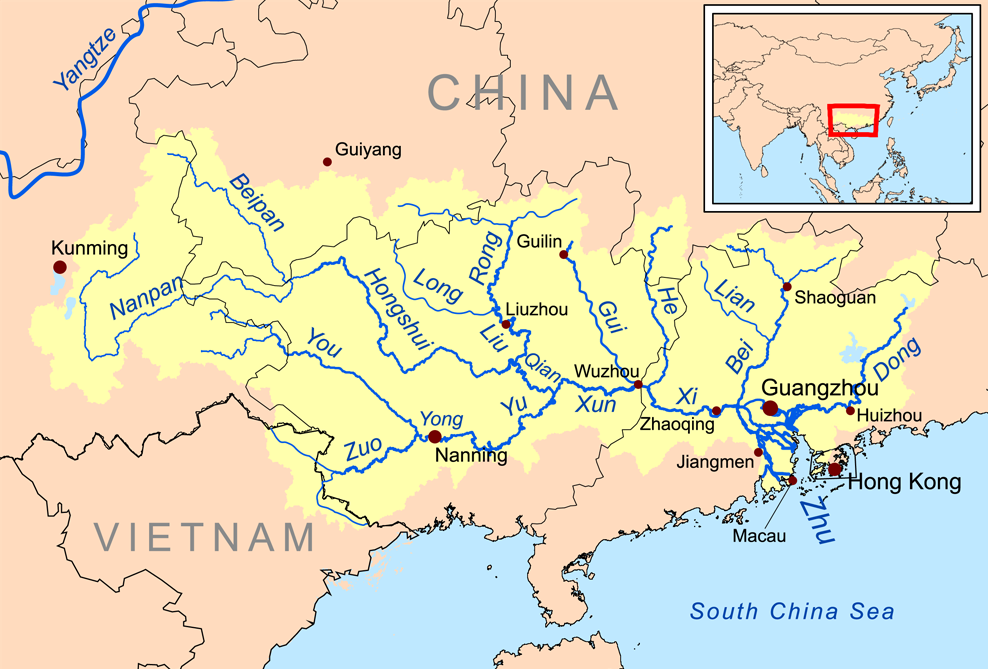
- Map of the Pearl River system

Location
- Country: China

Physical characteristics
- Length: 204 km (127 mi)
- Discharge
  - location: Liuzhou
  - average: 1,246 m^{3}/s (44,000 cu ft/s)

The Liu River (Chinese: 柳江, pinyin: Liǔ Jiāng, literally: Willow River) is a tributary within the Pearl River system in Guangxi, China. It is formed by the confluence of the Rong and Long rivers in Fengshan. It flows south through Liuzhou and then the Luoqing Jiang enters from the north. It meets the larger Hongshui He east of Laibin where it becomes known as the Qian Jiang.

The Liujiang River basin covers an area of 57,173,000 square kilometers, spanning three provinces/regions of Guangxi, Guizhou and Hunan. Its water system is in the shape of a tree branch, the upper reaches of the river have many beaches and fast-flowing, and wooden boats can be passed during the flood season below Sandu; the middle and lower reaches of the river are gentle, and the river bends are more developed. Karst landforms, such as peak plains, peaks and valleys are dominant, terraces and hills along the river are widely spread, cultivated land is concentrated and densely populated.

Non-native piranha were reported to have been spotted in the river at Liuzhou. On 7 July 2012, a resident came to Liu River near the second team of Baisha hydrophilic platform to give the dog a bath, was suddenly attacked by three piranhas.
