= Liujiang man =

Hominin fossil

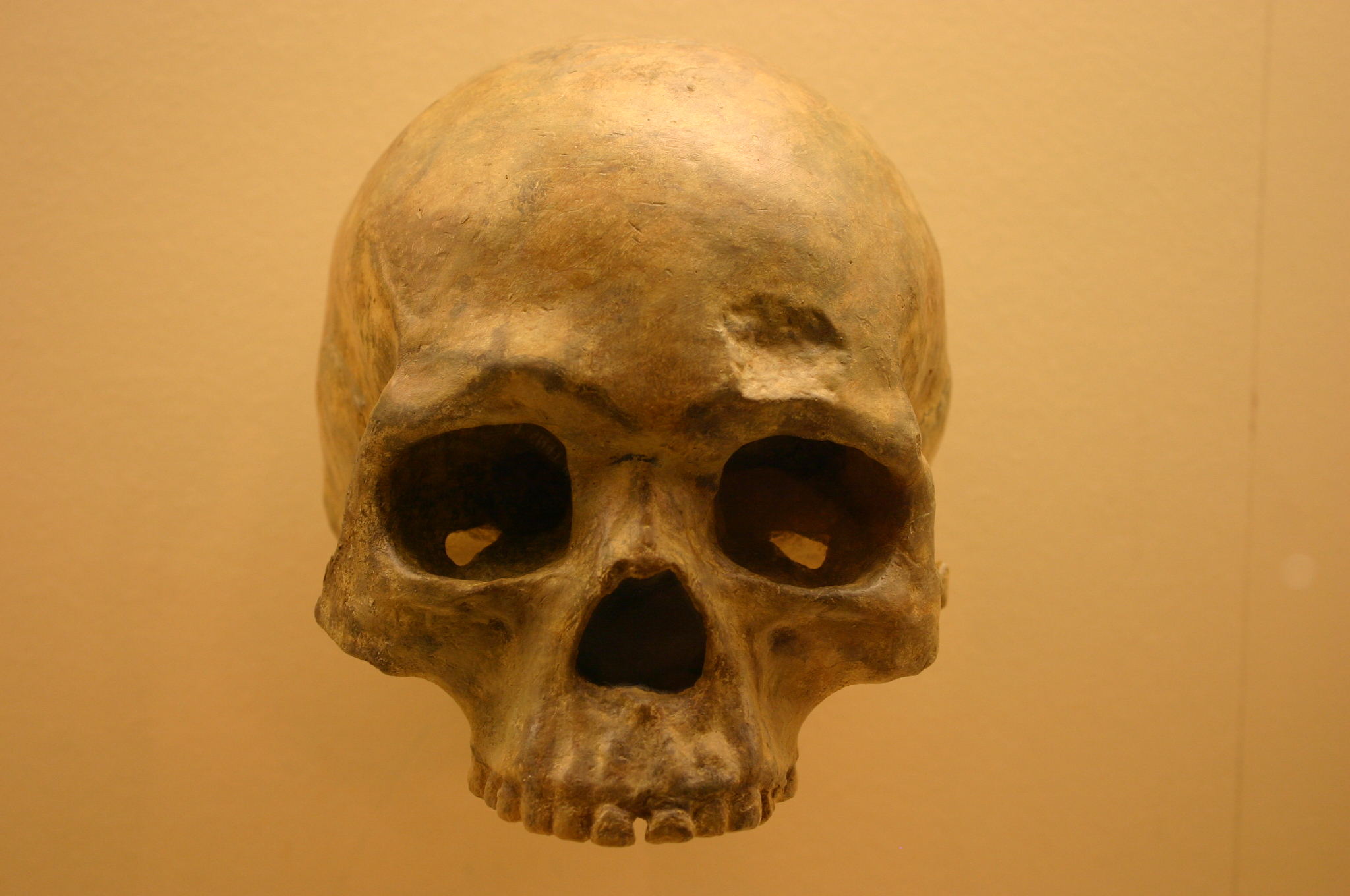
- Common name: Liujiang man
- Species: Homo sapiens
- Age: ~33,000 to 23,000 BP
- Place discovered: Tongtianyan Cave, China
- Date discovered: 1958

The Liujiang man (Chinese: 柳江人) is among the earliest modern humans (Homo sapiens) found in East Asia. The remains were discovered in the Tongtianyan Cave (通天岩) in Liujiang, Guangxi, China.

The remains were excavated in 1958 and consist of a well-preserved adult cranium, a right innominate (hip bone), complete sacrum, multiple vertebrae, and two femoral fragments. All remains are believed to have belonged to one individual.

Very little is known about the specimen due to a lack of academic sources published within the United States. There seems to be a discrepancy in determining accurate dates of the specimen due to the unknown stratigraphic context in which the remains were found.

The Liujiang sample was found to have craniometric and morphological similarities to modern day East Asian and Southeast Asian peoples, which is quite surprising and suggesting that these features are thus quite old, dating back to early humans, while some argue that this may support an independent origin for East/Southeast Asians within East Asia (multiregional model).

The remains were originally dated to the Late Pleistocene, to at least 68,000 years ago, but more likely, to approximately 111-139 bp. High rates of variability yielded by various dating techniques carried out by different researchers place the most widely accepted range of dates with 68,000 BP as a minimum, but did not rule out dates as old as 159,000 BP. Any date prior to 50,000 years ago would have been surprising, as it would seem to predate the "recent dispersal" scenario of coastal migration ("Out of Africa II"). The remains have been considered in the context of a possible early dispersal which left Africa before 100,000 years ago, but which was extinct (or "retracted back to Africa") before the arrival of the "recent dispersal" wave. A 2024 study provided new age estimates for these remains, recovering them as ~33,000 to 23,000 years old, in line with the age of other modern human fossils in Asia.

== Morphology ==
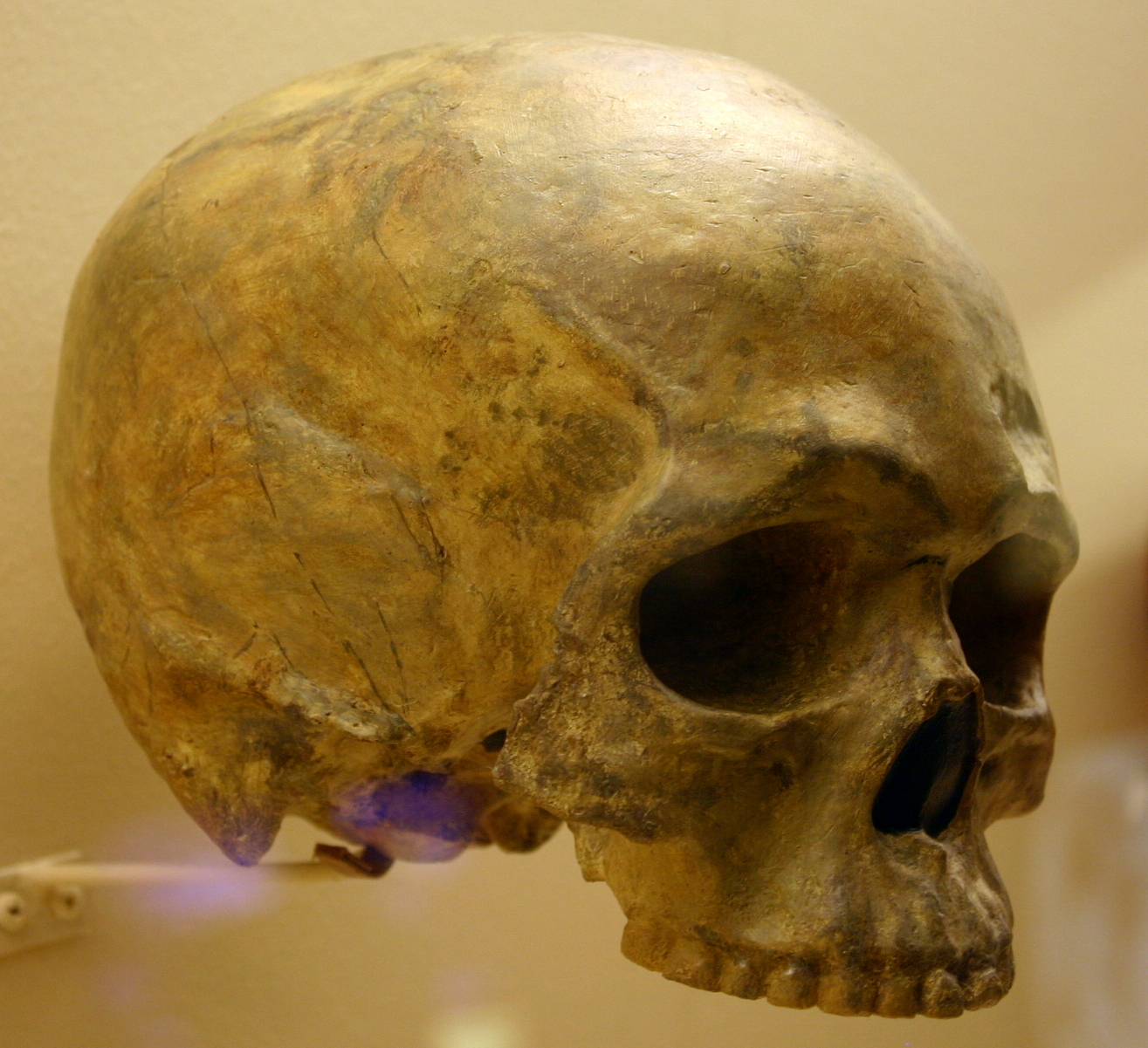
From the National Museum of Natural History

=== Regional population variation in sexual dimorphism hypothesis ===
Most scholars have interpreted the cranium of the specimen as male, but have encountered difficulties reaching a consensus in the sex of the pelvis. Scholar Karen Rosenburg argues that this difficulty is indicative of regional variations in the degree of sexual dimorphism consistent with modern populations. The degree of morphology variation consistent with modern populations suggest that the fossils may not be as old as previously thought.

=== Cranium (1567 cc) ===
The cranium of the Liujiang specimen is one of the most complete to be found in China. The cranium was found filled with a stone matrix. The matrix filling the brain was scanned using computed tomography (CT) and turned into a reconstructed 3D image of the brain. The shape of the brain shares many similarities with modern East Asians, including a rounded shape, wide frontal lobes, and enlarged brain height. One major difference between the Liujiang specimen and modern Chinese populations was the enlarged occipital lobes found on the Liujiang specimen. The common features between the Liujiang specimen and modern humans, along with the cranial capacity of the skull (1567 cc), places the specimen within the range of modern humans.
