= Rong River (Guangxi) =

River in Guangxi, China

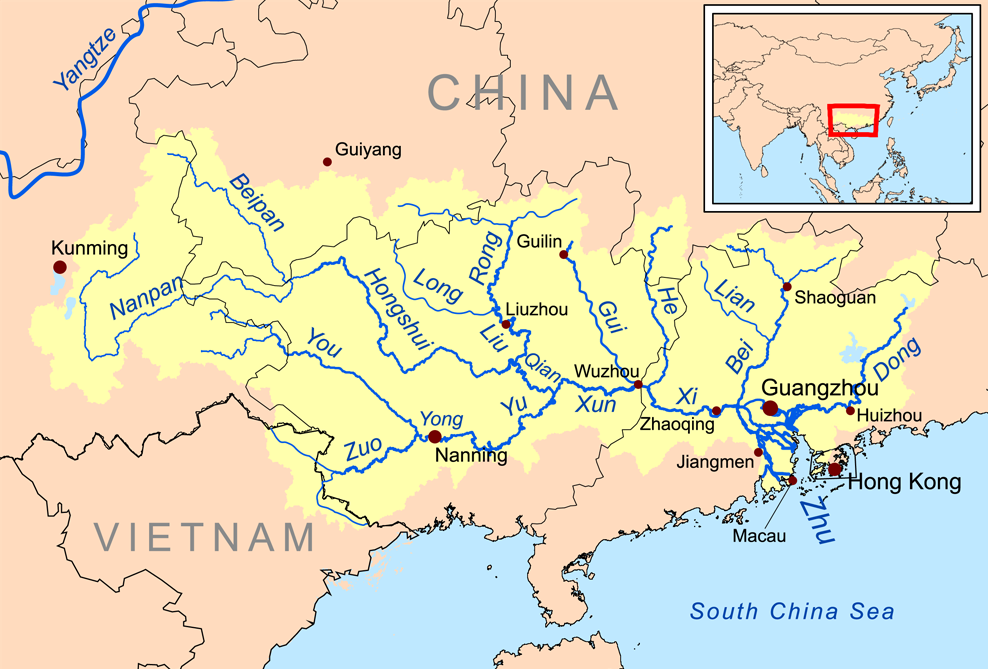

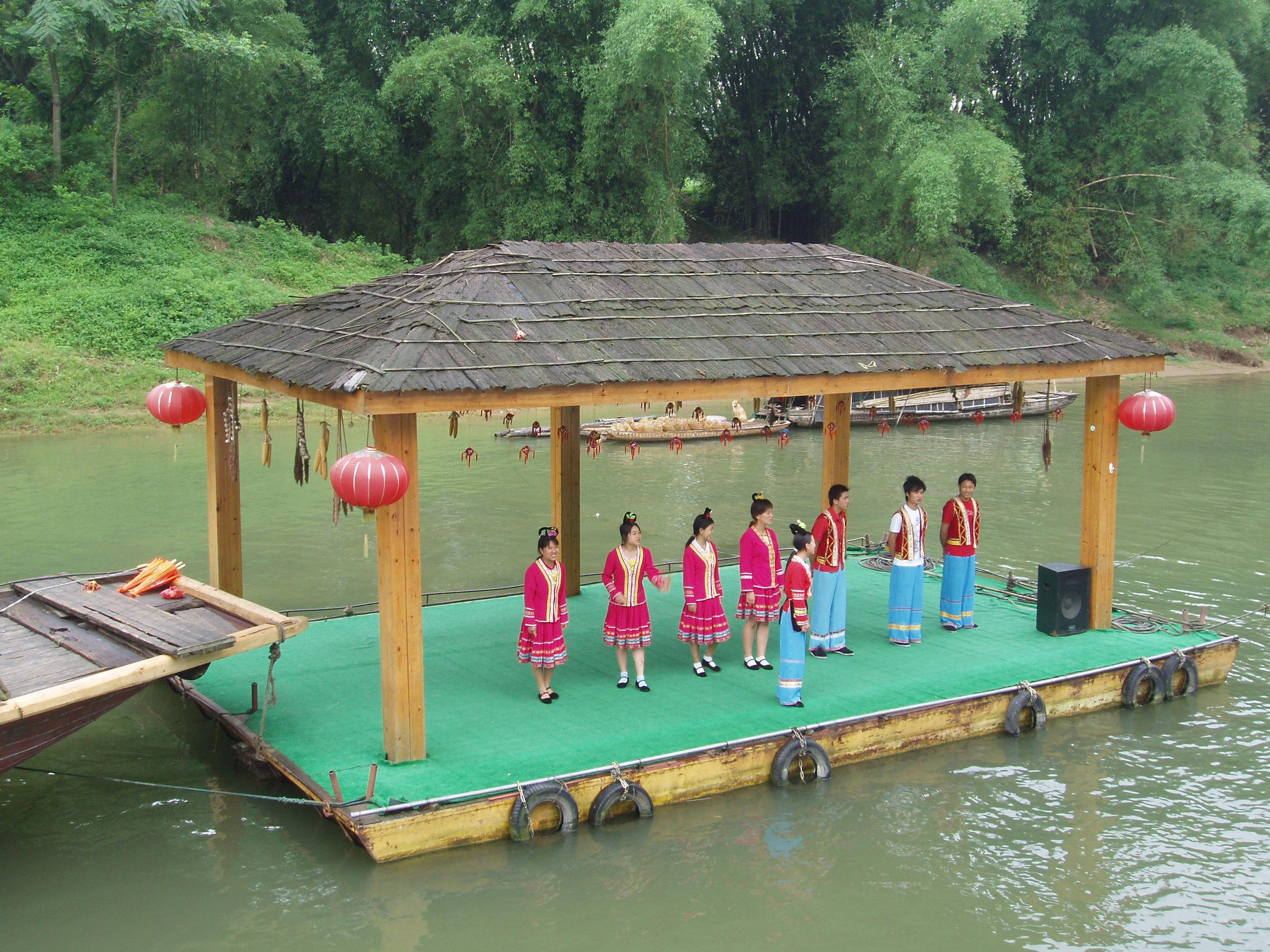
The river is inhabited by the Zhuang peoples

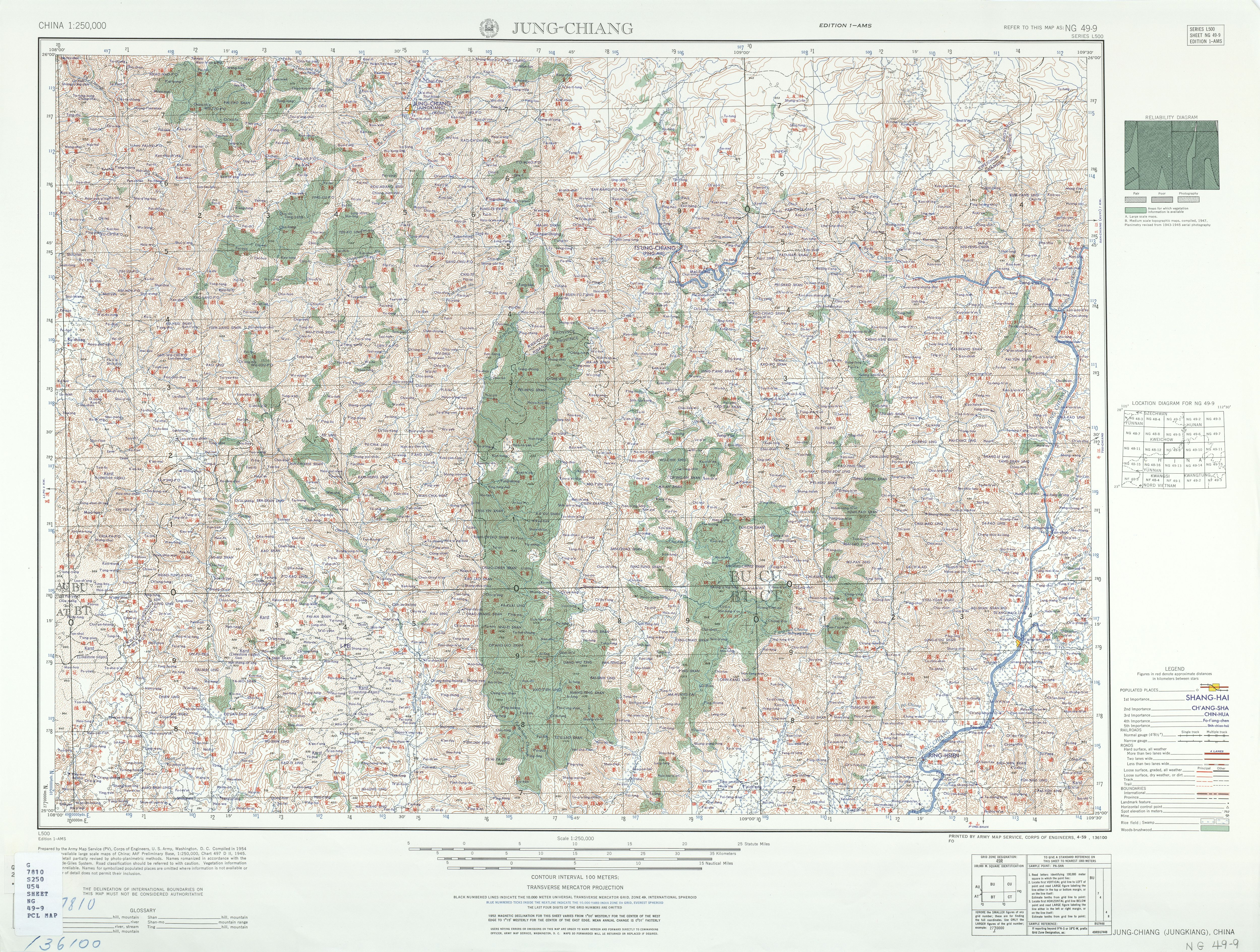
Map including the Rong River (labeled as JUNG CHIANG 融江) (AMS, 1954)

The Rong River (Chinese: 融江; pinyin: Róng Jiāng) is a river in Guangxi province in China

The river runs through the towns of Sanjiang and Rongshui. Parts of the river valley around the township of Longsheng are inhabited by the Zhuang people, who live in traditional wooden houses on the river.

Guding is an 80MW hydroelectric power project located on Rong river basin in Guangxi.
