= Classification of Southeast Asian languages =

Overview of Southeast Asian languages

There have been various classification schemes for Southeast Asian languages (see the articles for the respective language families).

== Language families ==
The five established major language families are:

- Austroasiatic
- Austronesian
- Hmong–Mien
- Kra–Dai
- Sino-Tibetan

== Isolates and small families ==
A number of language groups in Arunachal Pradesh traditionally considered to be Sino-Tibetan (Tibeto-Burman) may in fact constitute independent language families or isolates (Roger Blench 2011). (See Language isolates and independent language families in Arunachal.)

- Potential language isolates and independent language families in Arunachal: Digaro, Hrusish (including the Miji languages), Midzu, Puroik, Siangic, and Kho-Bwa
- The two Andamanese language families: Great Andamanese and Ongan
- Language isolates and languages with isolate substrata of Southeast Asia: Kenaboi, Enggano, Tambora and the Philippine Negrito languages Manide and Umiray Dumagat

== Macrofamilies ==
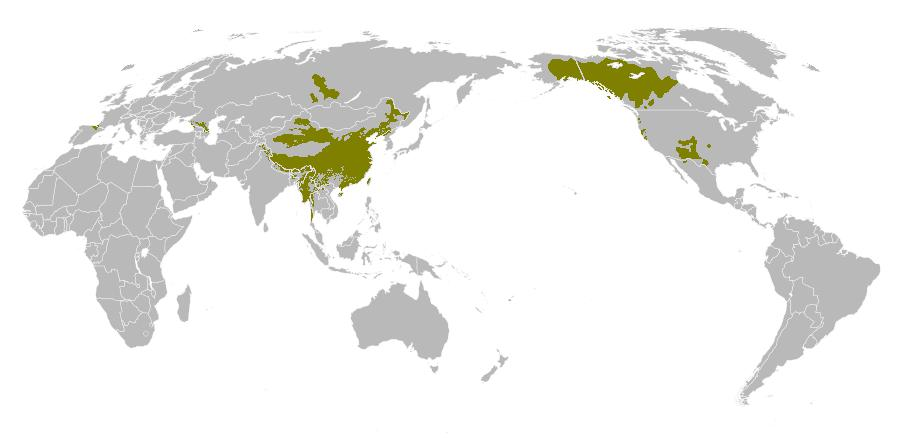
The Dené–Caucasian proposal

Several macrofamily schemes have been proposed for linking multiple language families of Southeast Asia. None of these proposals have been accepted by mainstream comparative linguistics, though research into higher-level relationships among these languages has gained some renewed scholarly interest over the last three decades; the various hypotheses are still under investigation, and the validity of each has yet to be resolved.

- Austro-Tai links the Austronesian and Kra–Dai languages. Several linguists, including Laurent Sagart, Stanley Starosta, Weera Ostapirat and Lawrence Reid, accept or theorize a close relationship between these families, but the specifics of the relationship remain unclear. Multiple models of the internal branching of Austro-Tai have been put forward, and Austro-Tai has been incorporated as a subgroup within some larger macrofamily schemes, e.g. in Starosta's East Asian as well as in Sagart's model of Austronesian (see below), both of which regard Kra–Dai as a subfamily within Austronesian. A few versions of Austro-Tai have included Japonic and/or the isolate Ainu as well, though these have not been met with as much acceptance.
- Miao–Dai (Kosaka 2002) is a hypothesis for a family including Miao–Yao (Hmong–Mien) and Kra–Dai.
- Sino-Austronesian (Sagart 2004, 2005) links Austro-Tai (Austronesian) with Sino-Tibetan (Tibeto-Burman).
- Austric links all of the major language families of Southeast Asia apart from Sino-Tibetan. Several variants of the Austric hypothesis have been proposed since it took shape with Paul K. Benedict's proposal (1942). Some of these also incorporate Japonic, Korean and/or Ainu. One version called the "Greater Austric" hypothesis (Bengtson 1996) includes Ainu as well as Nihali, a language isolate of India.
- The "Proto-Asian hypothesis" or "Austro-Asian" (Larish 2006) argues for lexical evidence of relationship among all of the languages typically included in Austric as well as Japanese–Korean and Sino-Tibetan.
- East Asian (Starosta 2005) covers all of these families (except Japonic, Koreanic, Ainu and Nihali) as well as Sino-Tibetan. It posits Austronesian (including Kra–Dai) as the most divergent branch, coordinate with a primary branch Sino-Tibetan–Yangzian which links Sino-Tibetan with a clade called Yangzian (or Yangtzean), named for the Yangtze river, which includes Austroasiatic and Hmong–Mien.
- In a different direction, the Dené–Caucasian or Sino-Caucasian hypothesis links Sino-Tibetan to Yeniseian and North Caucasian, the proposal later expanded to include Na-Dene, Burushaski and Basque. On the basis of lexicostatistics, Sergei Starostin additionally hypothesized an even larger Dené–Daic macrofamily which incorporates both Dené–Caucasian and Austric as primary branches.

Genetic similarities between the peoples of East and Southeast Asia have led some scholars such as George van Driem to speculate about "Haplogroup O languages".

== Proto-languages ==
- Proto-Austronesian
  - Proto-Malayo-Polynesian
    - Proto-Visayan language
    - Proto-Malayic language
    - Proto-Chamic language
    - Proto-Oceanic
      - Proto-Polynesian
- Proto-Kra–Dai
  - Proto-Kra
  - Proto-Kam–Sui
  - Proto-Hlai
  - Proto-Tai
- Proto-Austroasiatic
  - Proto-Palaungic
  - Proto-Khmeric
  - Proto-Aslian
  - Proto-Munda
- Proto-Sino-Tibetan
  - Old Chinese language
  - Proto-Tibeto-Burman
    - Proto-Loloish
    - Proto-Karenic
- Proto-Hmong–Mien
  - Proto-Hmongic
  - Proto-Mienic

=== Comparison ===
The following table compares the phonemic inventories of various recently reconstructed proto-languages of Southeast Asia.

Comparison of Proto-languages
Proto-language	Proto-Kra	Proto-Tai	Proto-Hlai	Proto-S. Kra–Dai	Proto-Austronesian	Proto-Tibeto-Burman	Proto-Mon–Khmer
Source	Ostapirat (2000)	Pittayaporn (2009)	Norquest (2007)	Norquest (2007)	Blust (2009)	Matisoff (2003)	Shorto (2006)
Consonants	32	33–36	32	28–29	25	23	21
Vowels	6	7	4–5	5–7	4	5–6	7
Diphthongs	4	5	–	1+	4	2+	3
Consonantal finals	7	10–11	–	–	–	6	–
Vowel length contrast	No	Yes	Yes	Yes	No	Yes	Yes

== Maps of language families ==
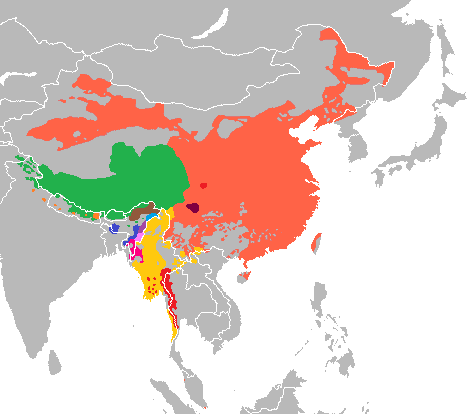
Distribution of Sino-Tibetan

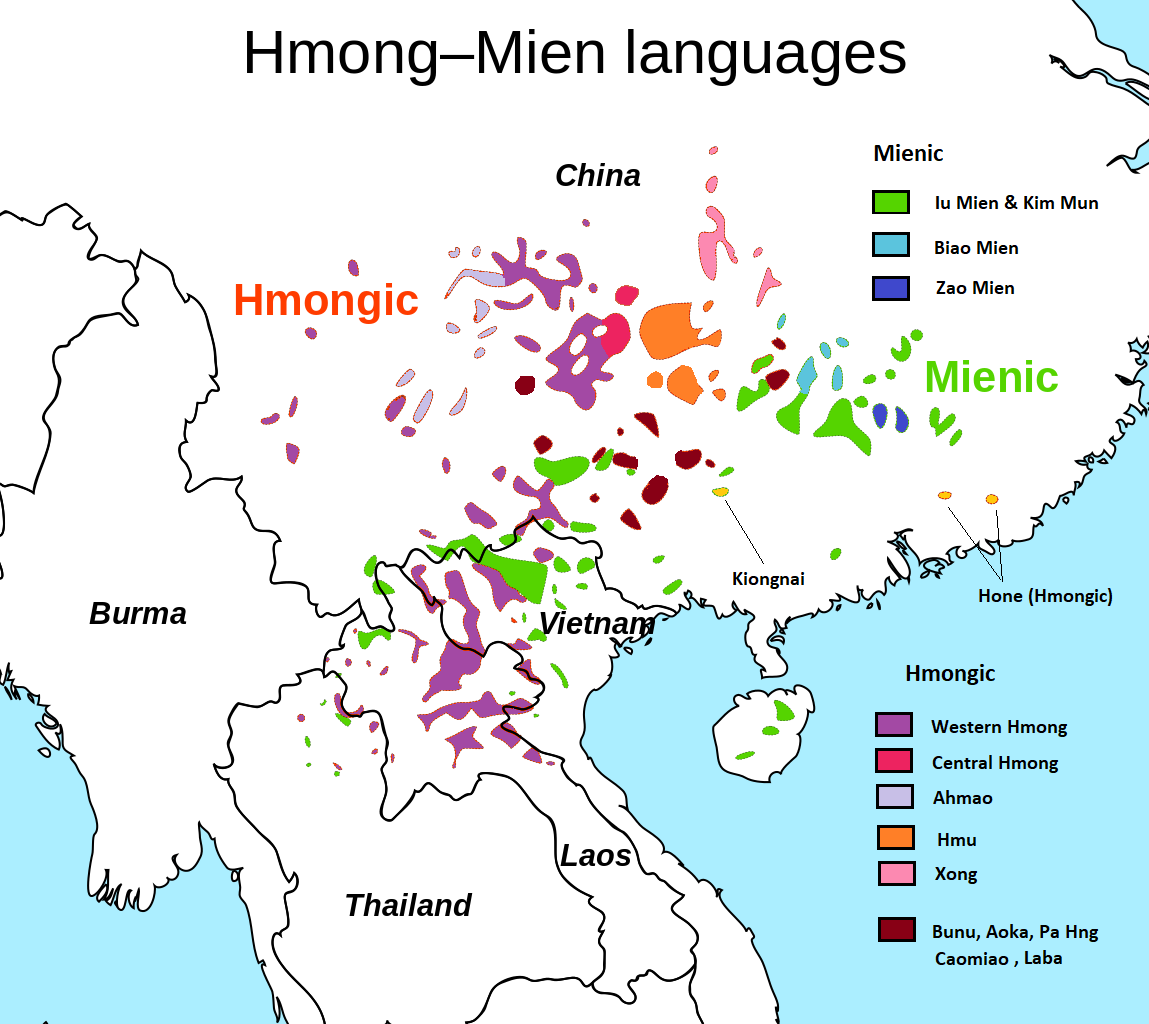
Distribution of Hmong–Mien

Distribution of Kra–Dai

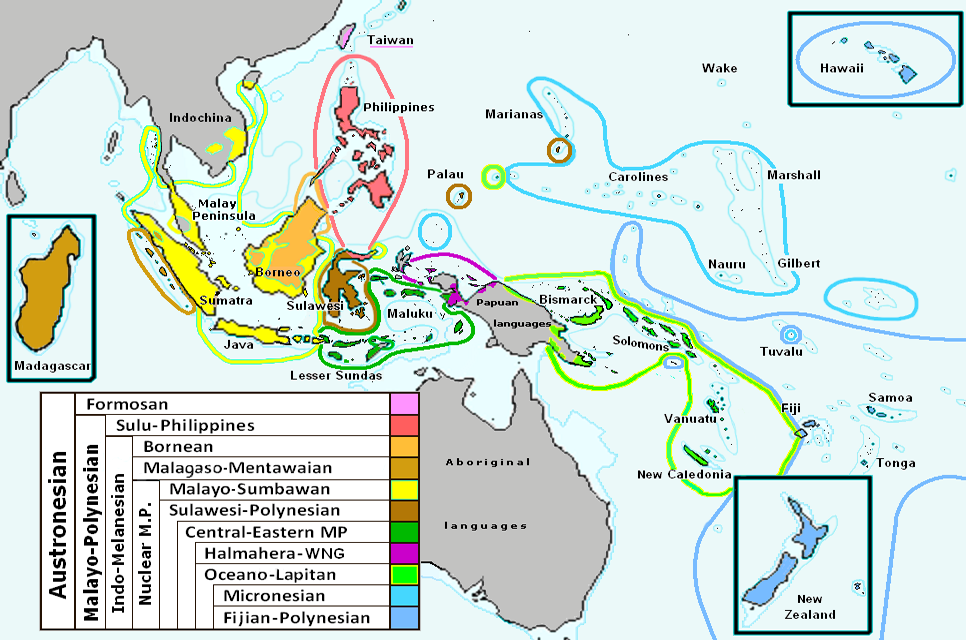
Distribution of Austronesian – Greenhill, Blust & Gray (2008)

Distribution of Austroasiatic

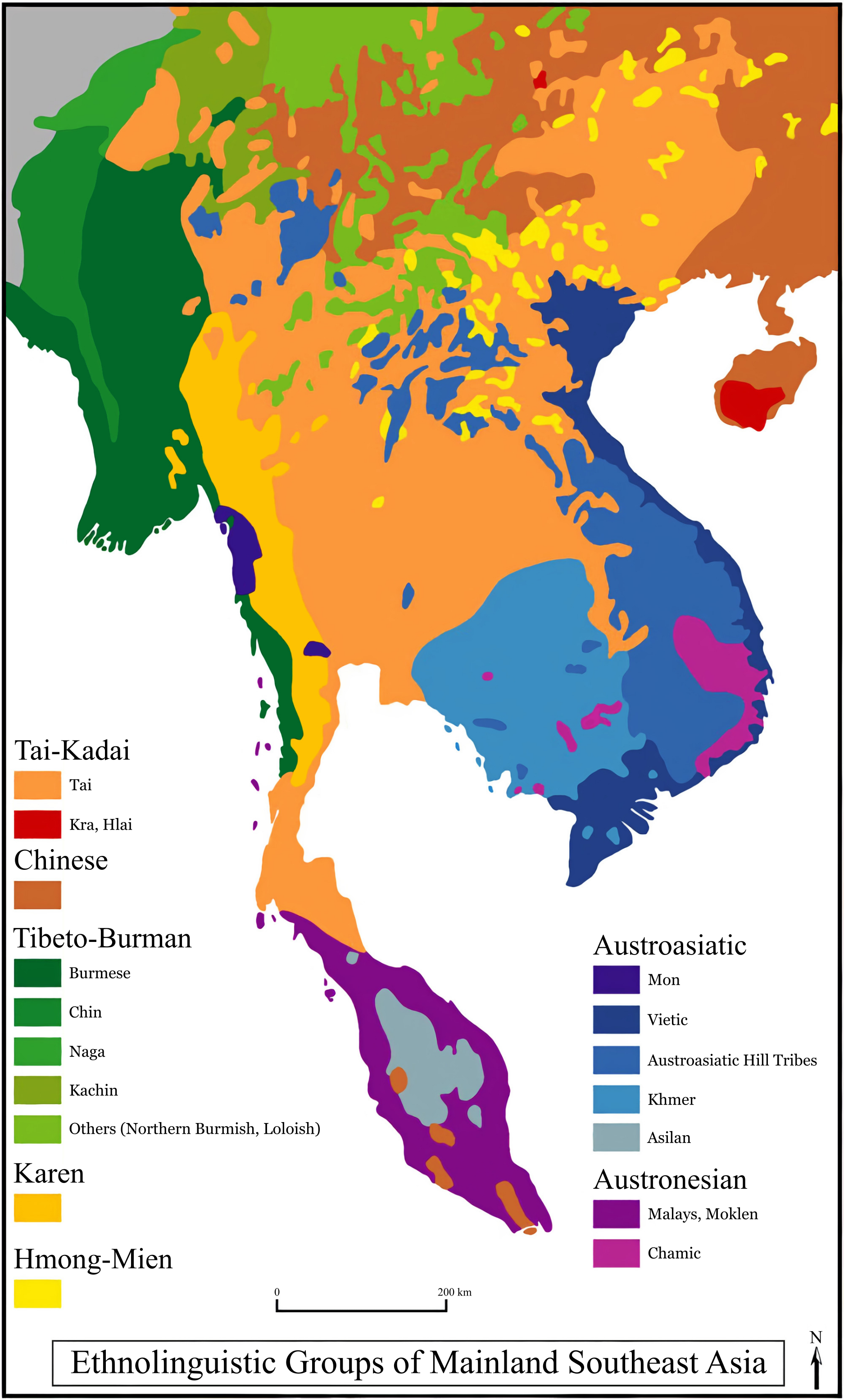
Overview of Mainland Languages

== See also ==
- Languages of China
- SEAlang Library
- Writing systems of Southeast Asia
- Category:Linguists of Southeast Asian languages
- Category:Linguists of Austronesian languages
- Vocabulary lists of Southeast Asian languages (Wiktionary)
