= Proto-Kam–Sui language =

Reconstructed ancestor of the Kam–Sui languages

Proto-Kam–Sui
- Reconstruction of: Kam–Sui languages
- Region: South China
- Reconstructed ancestor: Proto-Kra–Dai

Proto-Kam–Sui (typically abbreviated as PKS) is the reconstructed ancestor of the Kam–Sui languages.

== Reconstructions ==
A preliminary reconstruction of Proto-Kam–Sui has been published by Graham Thurgood (1988). Ostapirat (1994a, 1994b) addressed issues such as breathiness and preglottalized nasals in Proto-Kam-Sui. Ostapirat (2006) also proposed that presyllables in Proto-Kam–Sui had contrastive accent.

Another reconstruction of Proto-Kam–Sui, mostly based on Thurgood's reconstruction, was proposed by Ilia Peiros as part of his reconstruction of Tai-Kadai, which was done without taking the Kra languages into account.

A new reconstruction of Proto-Kam–Sui is currently being undertaken by Peter K. Norquest. Norquest (2021) reconstructs velarized consonantal onsets and retroflexes such as *ɭ in Proto-Kam–Sui.

== History ==
Liang & Zhang (1996) consider western Guangdong to be the original homeland of Proto-Kam–Sui. According to Liang & Zhang (1996:25–29), based on evidence from Chinese written historical records, Kam-Sui languages were originally spoken in western Guangdong, but Kam-Sui peoples later started to migrate out of Guangdong during the Sui dynasty and Tang dynasty (from the years 600–800). Sui and Maonan migrations were completed by the Song dynasty, around the years 1000–1100, while the Lakkia migrated to their current location in Guangxi from Huaiji County and Fengkai County, Guangdong during the beginning of the Ming dynasty (years 1300–1400).

== Lexicon ==
Thurgood's (1988: 209–218) reconstructed Proto-Kam–Sui forms are listed below.

- *hwaːt^{7} 'angry'
- *hnaːn^{5} 'angry'
- *taːp^{7} 'to answer'
- *mwit^{8} 'ant'
- *laːk^{8} 'arm'
- *k-xiːn^{1} 'arm'
- *khjaːk^{7} 'armpit'
- *taŋ^{1} 'arrive, reach'
- *cha^{5} 'ascend'
- *phwuːk^{7} 'ashes'
- *phlaːu^{5} 'ashes'
- *pa^{3} 'aunt'
- *hlaːi^{1} 'back(bone)'
- *lun^{2} 'back, behind'
- *hwaːi^{6} 'bad, cruel'
- *thruk^{7} 'bamboo strip'
- *xwan^{1} 'bamboo'
- *pwaŋ^{5} 'bank, shore'
- *khrau^{5} 'to bark'
- *ɗuŋ^{3} 'basket, winnowing'
- *ʔaːp^{7} 'bathe'
- *ʔmuːi^{1} 'bear'
- *m-luːt^{8} 'beard'
- *hȵiŋ^{1} 'bedbug'
- *mit^{8} 'bee'
- *daːŋ^{2} 'bee'
- *ʔdlu^{1} 'bee, wasp'
- *te^{3} 'below'
- *mluk^{8} 'bird'
- *krip^{7} 'bite; chew'
- *kam^{1} 'bitter'
- *ʔnam^{1} 'black'
- *ɓuːt^{7} 'blind'
- *phlaːt^{7} 'blood'
- *hwaːt^{7} 'blow (wind)'
- *dzup^{8} 'to blow'
- *thrun^{1} 'body'
- *tlaːk^{7} 'bone'
- *cam^{3} 'bow, bend'
- *duːi^{4} 'bowl, cup'
- *ʔŋa^{5} 'branch'
- *ciŋ^{5} 'branch'
- *praːk^{7} 'break, tear'
- **kraːŋ^{1} 'bright'
- *ɣwaːi^{4} 'brother, older'
- *dzuːk^{8} 'to bundle'
- *hmuk^{7} 'bury'
- *trai^{3} 'to buy'
- *kaːt^{7} 'cabbage'
- *laːp^{8} 'candle'
- *ʔma^{5} 'carry on back'
- *kjap^{7} 'catch, grasp'
- *kaːm^{1} 'cave'
- *khryap^{7} 'centipede'
- *tak^{7} 'chest (body)'
- *hmaːk^{7} 'to chew'
- *hnaːi^{5} 'to chew'
- *kaːi^{5} 'chicken'
- *hŋlaːŋ^{5} 'young chicken'
- *hmaːk^{7} 'to chop'
- *pram^{3} 'to chop'
- *khlap^{7} 'close (eyes)'
- *m-xwa^{3} 'cloud'
- *hnu^{1} 'cold'
- *paŋ^{1} 'collapse'
- *hma^{1} 'come; return'
- *kjaːp^{7}' 'to connect'
- *duŋ^{2} 'copper'
- *ȵai^{6}' 'count'
- *hraːŋ^{5} 'a cover'
- *khruːi^{1} 'cowry (money), shell(fish)'
- *hlaːi^{5} 'to crawl'
- *da^{6} 'cross, pass'
- *ka^{1} 'a crow'
- *kat^{7} 'to cut'
- *kaːt^{7} 'to cut'
- *hŋwan^{1} 'day'
- *ɗak^{7} 'deaf'
- *ʔyam^{1} 'deep'
- *hluːi^{5} 'descend'
- *laːi^{4} 'devil, ghost'
- *pjai^{1} 'to die'
- *di^{6} 'dirt, earth'
- *ɓja^{5} 'disgusted'
- *k-hma^{1} 'dog'
- *tu^{1} 'door'
- *gwau^{2} 'dove'
- *tak^{7} 'draw water'
- *te^{3} 'draw water'
- *pwjan^{1} 'dream'
- *trwap^{7} 'to drink'
- *tuk^{7} 'drop, fall'
- *tuk^{7} 'drop, fall'
- *dip^{8} 'dull'
- *mpraːŋ^{1} 'ear of grain'
- *khra^{1} 'ear'
- *khjam^{1} 'early'
- *caːn^{1} 'eat'
- *krai^{5} 'egg'
- *pjaːt^{7} 'eight'
- *phe^{1} 'end, tip'
- *ʔȵam^{5} 'evening'
- *hlik^{7} 'exchange'
- *ke^{4} 'excrement'
- *mpiŋ^{1} 'expensive'
- *ɗap^{7} 'extinguish'
- *thla^{1} 'eye'
- *ʔna^{3} 'face, in front'
- *lai^{4} 'to fall'
- *klaːi^{1} 'far'
- *tut^{7} 'fart'
- *gjaːŋ^{4} 'feed, raise'
- *traːi^{5} 'dry field'
- *ʔra^{5} 'paddy field'
- *ʔdlyap^{7}? 'fingernail'
- *pwai^{1} 'fire'
- *kuːn^{5} 'first'
- *mlit^{8} 'fish (loach)'
- *mprai^{3} 'fish'
- *pa^{1} 'fish'
- *mum^{6} 'fish'
- *ŋu^{4} 'five'
- *k-hmat^{7} 'flea'
- *naːn^{4} 'flesh, meat'
- *nuk^{7}'' 'flower'
- *muk^{8} 'fog'
- *praːk^{7} 'forehead'
- *ɗuŋ^{1} 'forest'
- *laːm^{2} 'to forget'
- *kup^{7} 'field frog'
- *k-wai^{3} 'small frog'
- *tiːk^{7} 'full'
- *ɗai^{3} 'to get, gain'
- *ʔȵaːk^{7} 'gills'
- *khjaːi^{1} 'to give'
- *ʔuːk^{7} 'to go out, out'
- *paːi^{1} 'to go, walk'
- *mwaːŋ^{1} 'god, ghost'
- *ɗaːi^{1} 'good'
- *gju^{4} 'granary'
- *khlaːn^{1} 'grandchild'
- *thrak^{7} 'grasshopper'
- *pram^{1} 'hair, head'
- *k-mja^{1} 'hand'
- **kra^{3} 'hard'
- *pram^{1} 'to hatch'
- *ʔnaŋ^{1} 'to have'
- *me^{2} 'to have'
- *kru^{3} 'head'
- *dai^{2} 'to hit'
- *ʔŋam^{1} 'to hold in mouth'
- *ʔuːm^{3} 'hold (child)'
- *ȵam^{1} 'to hold'
- *hŋuːm^{3} 'to hold'
- *m-kwaːu^{1} 'horn'
- *ma^{4} 'horse'
- *hraːn^{1} 'house'
- *ɓjaːk^{7} 'hungry'
- *ʔre^{1} 'husband'
- *mpaːk^{7} 'insane'
- *ȵak^{8} 'to insert'
- *tshaːp^{7} 'to insert'
- *khjaːi^{3} 'intestine'
- *khlit^{7} 'iron'
- *daːp^{8} 'to kick'
- *gruk^{8} 'to kneel'
- *miːt^{8} 'knife'
- *mbra^{4} 'knife, sword'
- *khwe^{1} 'late'
- *kru^{1} 'to laugh'
- *khlut^{7} 'lazy'
- *laːn^{4} 'lazy'
- *pwa^{5} 'leaf'
- *ʔniŋ^{3} 'to lean'
- *mpliŋ^{1} 'leech'
- *kla^{1} 'left over'
- *kwa^{1} 'leg'
- *tiːn^{1} 'leg, foot'
- *lja^{2}? 'lick'
- *ljaːm^{5}? 'lick'
- *ɓau^{1} 'light, to float'
- *ʔdlaːp^{7} 'lightning'
- *maŋ^{4} 'to like'
- *tap^{7} 'liver'
- *ʔraːi^{3} 'long'
- *kraːk^{7} 'loom'
- *tuk^{7} 'to lose, misplace'
- *nan^{1}'' 'louse'
- *mprai^{1} 'louse, chicken'
- *mprum^{1} 'to love (child)'
- *thram^{5} 'low'
- **ʔnuːn^{1} 'maggot'
- *mpaːn^{1} 'male (person)'
- *ʔme^{1} 'mark'
- *hle^{1} 'mark'
- *mpraːŋ^{1} 'mat (straw)'
- *ŋe^{2} 'meal, early'
- *mbrau^{2} 'meal, late'
- *gja^{2} 'medicine, to cure'
- *ta^{5} 'middle'
- *muːn^{6} 'monkey'
- *nüaːn^{1}'' 'moon, month'
- *hjit^{7} 'morning'
- *paːk^{7} 'mouth'
- *muːk^{8} 'mucus'
- *khlum^{5} 'mud, dirt'
- *naːm^{5} 'mud, dirt'
- *hŋla^{1} 'mushroom'
- *taːk^{7} 'to nail'
- *ɓlwa^{1} 'navel'
- *phlai^{5} 'near'
- *ke^{1} 'net (to cast)'
- *hmai^{5} 'new'
- *ʔnaŋ^{1} 'nose, face'
- *man^{2} 'oil'
- *kaːu^{5} 'old (things)'
- *ke^{5} 'old (vegetables)'
- *ɓjaːn^{3} 'otter, beaver'
- *chaːt^{7} 'otter, beaver'
- *ʔŋluːk^{7} 'outside'
- *phwa^{3} 'palm (hand)'
- *lin^{6} 'pangolin'
- *laːk^{8} 'person, child'
- *kjaːk^{7} 'pestle'
- *cup^{7} 'to pick up'
- *ɓit^{7} 'to pick (flowers)'
- *laːi^{6} 'to pick, select'
- *k-hmu^{5} 'pig'
- *ʔdlaːi^{5} 'wild pig'
- *dap^{8} 'to pile'
- *ʔlaːu^{1} 'pillar'
- *liːn^{2} 'pipe, water'
- *ljum^{2} 'to plant'
- *mpra^{1} 'to plant'
- *ʔdram^{1} 'to transplant'
- *pwak^{7} 'pod, sheath'
- *hŋlaːn^{1} 'shoulder pole'
- *ʔmiːn^{3} 'porcupine, wild pig'
- *ʔdlaːk^{7} 'to pull'
- *zuk^{8} 'pus'
- *kat^{7} 'to put'
- *naːŋ^{1} 'raft, bamboo'
- *xwin^{1} 'to rain'
- *hnu^{3} 'rat, mouse'
- *ɗip^{7} 'raw, live'
- *duk^{8} 'to read'
- *hwa^{1} 'right side'
- *zuk^{8} 'ripe, cooked'
- *hma^{3} 'to rise (river)'
- *ʔnja^{1} 'river'
- *pra^{1} 'rock, cliff'
- *kjaːŋ^{1} 'root'
- *ʔlaːk^{7} 'rope'
- *laːn^{6} 'to rot'
- *naːu^{6} 'rotten'
- **krin^{5} 'scales'
- *khjaːn^{5} 'to scare'
- *tak^{7} 'to scoop'
- *ʔlun^{1} 'to see'
- *ɗai^{3} 'to see'
- *pwan^{1} 'seed'
- *kla^{3} 'rice seedling'
- *kwe^{1} 'to sell'
- *ʔŋra^{1} 'sesame'
- *tau^{1} 'shadow'
- *ŋaːu^{2} 'to shake'
- *m-hliːn^{5}? 'shallow'
- *hraːi^{5} 'be sharp'
- *gwan^{2} 'to sharpen'
- *khjam^{1} 'sharpened, pointed'
- *ɗau^{5} 'spiral shell'
- *thrin^{3} 'short'
- *pjau^{5} 'shuttle'
- *nu^{4} 'younger sibling'
- *ʔram^{1} 'to sink'
- *dzuːi^{6} 'to sit'
- *ljuk^{8} 'six'
- *hŋra^{1} 'skin'
- *ʔrwum^{1}? 'skinny, lean'
- *ɓun^{1} 'sky'
- *nuːn^{2} 'to sleep'
- *nun^{4} 'to smell'
- *dzuːi^{2} 'snake'
- *ʔnuːi^{1} 'snow'
- *hma^{5} 'soak, pickle'
- *maːt^{8} 'socks'
- *ʔma^{3} 'soft'
- *khjum^{3} 'sour'
- *tljaːi^{3}? 'sparrow'
- *m-hljaːn^{5} 'spicy (hot)'
- *pha^{5} 'to split'
- *hmaːk^{7} 'to split'
- *ŋa^{2} 'sprout, a'
- *khlak^{7} 'stake, post'
- *ʔdraːu^{1} 'star'
- *hmlut^{7} 'star'
- *ŋjaːu^{6} 'to stay, live'
- *hljak^{7} 'to steal'
- *luŋ^{2} 'stomach'
- *mpwaːŋ^{1} 'straw'
- *kruːi^{3} 'stream'
- *kjak^{7} 'to stuff'
- *hwit^{7}' 'to stuff'
- *ʔuːi^{3} 'sugar cane'
- *ʔiːn^{5} 'a swallow'
- *phjit^{7}? 'to sweep'
- *khwaːn^{1} 'sweet'
- *khjut^{7} 'tail'
- *ʔaːu^{1} 'to take'
- *ɓraːk^{7} 'taro'
- *ʔna^{1} 'thick'
- *ʔnak^{7} 'thick, viscous'
- *ɓwaːŋ^{1} 'thin'
- *naːi^{6} 'this'
- *tiːn^{3} 'thunder'
- *lai^{6} 'thunder'
- *pra^{3} 'thunder, lightning'
- *mum^{4} 'tiger'
- *khwe^{3} 'tired'
- *ʔni^{5} 'tired'
- *ma^{2} 'tongue'
- *pjwan^{1} 'tooth'
- *hȵa^{5} 'trace, dregs'
- *mai^{4} 'tree, wood'
- *kjaːt^{7} 'to twist'
- *hra^{1} 'two'
- *ta^{1} 'uncle'
- *kam^{3} 'upside down'
- *juŋ^{6} 'to use'
- *ʔma^{1} 'vegetable'
- *hruːi^{1} 'vestige'
- *ɓaːn^{3} 'village'
- *trwak^{7} 'to vomit'
- *kra^{3} 'to wait'
- *chaːm^{3} 'to walk, crawl'
- *aːu^{1} 'to want'
- *ʔlak^{7} 'to wash clothes'
- *zuːk 'to wash hands'
- *ȵam^{3} 'water'
- *traːu^{1} 'we (incl.)'
- *tan^{3} 'to wear'
- *tam^{3} 'to weave'
- *kjaːn^{1} 'to weave, plait'
- *ne^{1}'' 'to weed'
- *ʔȵe^{3} 'to weep, cry'
- *ɓun^{5} 'well, spring'
- *ɓu^{5} 'well, spring'
- *thlam^{1} 'well, pond, pool'
- *ʔrak^{7} 'wet'
- *hlwum^{1} 'wind'
- *khlaːu^{3} 'rice wine'
- *pwa^{5} 'wing'
- *ɓjaːk^{7} 'woman, girl'
- *trit^{7} '(fire)wood'
- *dzan^{4} 'worm'
- *tuːk^{7} 'to wrap, bundle'
- *ɓjuːt^{7}? 'to wring towel'
- *kjaːt^{7} 'to write'
- *man^{2} 'yam'
- *mpe^{1} 'year'

== Comparison with Proto-Tai ==
Some Proto-Kam-Sui lexical items are cognate with Proto-Tai but differ in proto-tone.

Gloss	Proto-Kam-Sui	Proto-Tai
‘pig’	*qʰ-muːh	*m̥uː
‘rat’	*hnɔːʔ	*n̥uː
‘long’	*ʔraːjʔ	*rɯj

The reconstructions above are those of Norquest (2021).
