= Peter K. Norquest =

American linguist (born 1971)

- Born: Peter Kristian Norquest; August 31, 1971 (age 55); Boise, Idaho, United States
- Occupation: Linguist

Academic background
- Education: University of Arizona
- Thesis: A Phonological Reconstruction of Proto-Hlai (2007)
- Doctoral advisor: Jane H. Hill and Diana B. Archangeli

Academic work
- Discipline: Historical linguistics
- Institutions: University of Arizona
- Main interests: Kra–Dai languages
- Notable works: A Phonological Reconstruction of Proto-Hlai (2015)

Peter K. Norquest (born August 31, 1971) is an American linguist who specializes in Kra–Dai historical linguistics.

== Education ==
Norquest attended the University of Arizona's Joint PhD program in Anthropology and Linguistics, where he studied under Jane H. Hill and Diana B. Archangeli. As part of his doctoral research, he participated in a Fulbright fellowship in Hainan, China from 2003 to 2004, where he collected field data on various Hlai languages such as Nadou. In 2007, he completed his doctoral dissertation on the reconstruction of Proto-Hlai.

== Career ==
After obtaining his Ph.D. in 2007, Norquest was employed as a postdoctoral researcher under J. Stephen Lansing at the University of Arizona, where he worked on quantitative comparative-historical linguistic reconstruction methods and on the Austronesian languages of Nusa Tenggara.

From 2015 to 2016, Norquest was the principal investigator of Reconstructing Language Change and Variation, a National Science Foundation project that aims to provide a revised reconstruction of Proto-Kam–Sui.

Norquest is currently working on a reconstruction of Proto-Kra–Dai. Parts of his reconstructions have been published in Norquest (2020, 2021).

== Monographs and chapters ==
- Norquest, Peter (2015). A Phonological Reconstruction of Proto-Hlai. Brill. doi:10.1163/9789004300521. hdl:10150/194203. ISBN 978-90-04-30052-1.
- Norquest, Peter (2021). "Classification of (Tai-)Kadai/Kra-Dai languages". The Languages and Linguistics of Mainland Southeast Asia. De Gruyter. pp. 225–246. doi:10.1515/9783110558142-013. ISBN 9783110558142. S2CID 238672319.

== Selected articles ==
- Norquest, Peter (2020). A Hypothesis on the Origin of Preglottalized Sonorants in Kra-Dai. 38th West Coast Conference on Formal Linguistics. Vancouver: Department of Linguistics, University of British Columbia. doi:10.14288/1.0389866
- Norquest, Peter (2016). "Revisiting the question of Austronesian implosives". Mother Tongue. 20 (In Memory of Harold Crane Fleming (1926-2015)).
- Norquest, Peter (2013). "A Revised Inventory of Proto Austronesian Consonants: Kra-Dai and Austroasiatic Evidence" (PDF). Mon-Khmer Studies. 42: 102–126.
- Tumonggor, Meryanne K; Karafet, Tatiana M; Downey, Sean; Lansing, J Stephen; Norquest, Peter; Sudoyo, Herawati; Hammer, Michael F; Cox, Murray P (2014). "Isolation, contact and social behavior shaped genetic diversity in West Timor". Journal of Human Genetics. 59 (9). Springer Science and Business Media LLC: 494–503. doi:10.1038/jhg.2014.62. ISSN 1434-5161. PMC 4521296. PMID 25078354.
- Downey, Sean S.; Hallmark, Brian; Cox, Murray P.; Norquest, Peter; Lansing, J. Stephen (2008). "Computational Feature-Sensitive Reconstruction of Language Relationships: Developing the ALINE Distance for Comparative Historical Linguistic Reconstruction". Journal of Quantitative Linguistics. 15 (4). Informa UK Limited: 340–369. doi:10.1080/09296170802326681. ISSN 0929-6174. S2CID 4849552.
- Norquest, Peter (2005). "Word structure in Chamic: prosodic alignment versus segmental faithfulness". In Grant, A. and Sidwell, P. editors, Chamic and Beyond: Studies in mainland Austronesian languages. PL-569:147-188. Pacific Linguistics, The Australian National University. doi:10.15144/PL-569.147
- Norquest, Peter (1998). "Greenberg's Visit to Arizona". Mother Tongue Newsletter 31:25f.

== See also ==
- Jerold A. Edmondson
- Li Fang-Kuei
