= Proto-Kra–Dai language =

Reconstructed ancestor of the Kra–Dai languages

Proto-Kra–Dai
- PKD
- Reconstruction of: Kra–Dai languages
- Region: Pearl River region
- Reconstructed ancestor: Proto-Austro-Tai (proposed)
- Lower-order reconstructions: Proto-Kam–Sui; Proto-Kra; Proto-Hlai; Proto-Tai

Proto-Kra–Dai (typically abbreviated as PKD) is the proposed reconstructed ancestor of the Kra–Dai languages.

== Background ==
No full reconstruction of Proto-Kra–Dai has been published to date, although tentative reconstructions of many Proto-Kra–Dai roots have been attempted from time to time. Some preliminary Proto-Kra–Dai forms have been reconstructed by Benedict (1975) and Wu (2002). Wu (2002) presents a reconstruction of Proto-Kra–Dai phonemes, which is based on data from the Tai, Kam-Sui, Hlai, and Kra branches.

Liang & Zhang (1996) propose a reconstruction of Proto-Kra–Dai (Chinese: 原始侗台语) initials and finals, using data from all Kra–Dai branches except for Kra and Jiamao.

== Phonology ==
Proto-Kra–Dai has the finals *-l and *-c, which have been lost in most present-day Kra–Dai languages. It also has the final stops *-p, *-t, *-k and final nasals *-m, *-n, *-ŋ.

Ostapirat (2023) proposes the following consonant inventory for Proto-Kra–Dai, which is relatively simple compared to that of Proto-Tai and other lower-level reconstructions.

Proto Kra-Dai consonants Ostapirat (2023)
		Labial	Coronal	Palatal	Velar	Uvular	Glottal
Nasal		m	n	ɲ	ŋ		
Plosive	Voiceless	p	t, ts	c	k	q	ʔ
Plosive	Voiced	b	d	ɟ	ɡ		
Fricative			θ, s				
Approximant		w	r, l	j			

Norquest (2020) proposes the preglottalized sonorants *ʔb, *ʔd, *ʔɖ, *ʔɟ for Proto-Kra–Dai, as part of a four-way phonation distinction in Kra-Dai sonorants consisting of preaspirated, voiceless, plain, and preglottalized sonorants. Norquest (2020) also reconstructs velarized initial consonants (*Cˠ-) in Proto-Kra–Dai.

Below is a table of Proto-Kra–Dai pre-syllables and their developments as proposed by Norquest (2020).

p-Kra-Dai	p-Lakkja	p-Kam-Sui	p-Ong-Be	p-Tai	p-Hlai
*C-b	*w̥	*C-b	*ʔb	*C-b	*ʋ
*C-d	*l̥	*C-ʔɖ	*r̥	*C-d	*ɾ
*C-ɖ	*j̊ (< *r̥)	*C-ʔɖ	*r	*C-ɖ	*ɾ
*C-ɟ	*l̥	*ʔj	*j̊	*ʔj	*hj
*Cəʔb	*ʔb	*ʔb	*ʔb	*ʔb	*ɓ
*Cəʔd	*l̥	*ʔd	*r̥	*ʔd	*ɗ
*Cəʔɖ	*l̥	*ʔɖ	*r̥	*ʔd	*ɗ
*Cəʔɟ	*j̊	*ʔɟ	*j̊	*ʔɟ	*tɕ
*Cəm	*m̥	*ʔm	*m̥	*m̥	*ʔm
*Cən	*n̥	*ʔn	*n̥	*n̥	*ʔn
*Cəȵ	*ȵ̥	*ʔȵ	*ȵ̥	*ȵ̥	*ʔȵ
*Cəŋ	*ŋ̊	*ʔŋ	*ŋ̊	*ŋ̊	*ʔŋ
*Cəl	*l̥	*l̥	*l̥	*l̥	*ʔl
*Cər	*j̊ (< *r̥)	*ʔr	*ʃ	*Cr	*hr
*Cəʀ	(*j̊)	*ʔʀ	(*ʃ)	(*ʀ̥)	(*hr)
*Cəw	*w̥	*ʔw	*w̥	*ʔw	(*ʔw)
*Cəj	*j̊	*ʔj	*j̊	*ʔj	(*ʔj)

Ostapirat (2023) considers many Proto-Tai spirants and rhotics to have developed from the intervocalic lenition of Proto-Kra–Dai medial obstruents. Voicing in the Proto-Tai initial is determined by the voicing of the preceding consonant in the Proto-Kra–Dai form.

p-Kra–Dai	p-Tai
*(C)-p-	*v- [β]
*(C̥)-p-	*f- [βʰ]
*(C)-t-	*r-
*(C̥)-t-	*rʰ-
*(C)-ts-	*z- [ɮ]
*(C̥)-ts-	*s-
*(C)-k-	*ɣ-
*(C̥)-k-	*x-
*-q-	*-ɢ-

Some Proto-Kra–Dai sesquisyllabic consonant onsets reconstructed by Ostapirat (2023) are:

Gloss	p-Kra–Dai	p-Tai	p-Kam–Sui
taro	*b.r-	*prɨak D	*ʔraːk D
thin	*b.r-	*proːm A	*ʔruːm A
forehead	*p.r-	*praːk D	*praːk D
hair	*p.r-	*prom A	*pram A
ribs	*g.r-	*kraːŋ C	
"Kra"; slave	*k.r-	*kraː C	

=== Liang & Zhang (1996) ===
Liang & Zhang (1996) propose the following reconstructions of Proto-Kra–Dai (Chinese: 原始侗台语) initials and finals, using data from all Kra–Dai branches except for Kra and Jiamao.

Initial consonants

- Plain stop initials
  - *p, *pw, *pl, *plw, *pr
  - *t, *tl, *tr
  - *k, *kw, *kl, *klw, *kr, *krw
  - *q, *ql, *qr, *ʔ
  - *b, *bw, *bl, *blw, *br
  - *d, *dl, *dr
  - *g, *gw, *gl, *glw, *gr, *grw, *ɢ
- Voiced aspirated initials
  - *bɦ, *bwɦ, *brɦ
  - *dɦ, *ndlɦ
  - *gɦ, *gwɦ
  - *ɣɦ, *ɣwɦ, *ɢɦ, *ʁɦ, *sɢrɦ
- Preglottalized initials
  - *ʔb, *ʔbw, *ʔbl, *ʔblw
  - *ʔd, *ʔdl, *ʔdr
  - *ʔm, *ʔml, *ʔmr
  - *ʔn, *ʔnl, *ʔnr, *ʔȵ, *ʔŋ, *ʔŋw
- Voiceless nasal initials
  - *m̥, *m̥w, *m̥l, *m̥r, *m̥rw
  - *n̥, *n̥l, *ȵ̥, *ȵ̥w, *ŋ̊, *ŋ̊w
- Plain nasal initials
  - *m, *mw, *ml, *mr
  - *n, *nr, *ȵ, *ŋ, *ŋw, *ŋr, *ɴl
- Prenasalized initials
  - *mp, *mpl, *mpr
  - *nt, *ntl, *ntr
  - *ŋk, *ŋkw, *ŋkl
  - *mb, *mbl, *mbr
  - *nd, *ndl, *ndr
  - *ŋg, *ŋgl, *ŋgr
- Glide and liquid initials
  - *ʔw, *ʔr, *ʔj
  - *w̥, *l̥, *r̥, *j̥
  - *w, *l, *r, *j
- Fricative initials
  - *s, *sw, *sl, *sr, *ɕ, *x, *xw, *xl, *xr, *h
  - *z, *zl, *zr, *ʑ, *ɣ, *ɣw, *ɣl, *ʁ, *ɦ
- Initial clusters beginning with fricatives
  - *xp, *xpl, *xpr, *xt, *xk, *xkw, *xkl, *xklw, *xkr, *xkrw, *xq, *xql
  - *sp, *spw, *spl, *st, *stl, *str, *sk, *skw, *skl, *skr, *skrw, *sq, *sqr
  - *zb, *zd, *zdw, *zgr

Vowels and diphthongs

- *a, *a, *i̯a, *u̯a, *ɯ̯a
- *ə̯, *i̯ə, *u̯ə
- *ɛ, *i̯ɛ, *e, *i̯e
- *ɔ, *u̯ɔ, *ɯ̯ɔ, *o, *i̯o, *u̯o, *ɯ̯o
- *i̯, *u̯i, *ie, iə, *ia, *iɛ
- *u, *i̯u, *ɯ̯u, *ue, *uə, *ua, *uo, *uɔ, *uɯ
- *ɯ, *ɯe, *ɯə, *ɯa, *ɯɔ, *ɯu

== Lexicon ==
=== Ostapirat (2018, 2023) ===
Weera Ostapirat (2018a) reconstructs disyllabic forms for Proto-Kra–Dai, rather than sesquisyllabic or purely monosyllabic forms. His Proto-Kra–Dai reconstructions also contains the finals */-c/ and */-l/. Ostapirat (2018b:113) lists the following of his own Proto-Kra–Dai reconstructions.

Notes:

- */K-/: either /k-/ or /q-/
- */C-/: unspecified consonant
- */T-/ and */N-/ are distinct from */t-/ and */n-/.

Gloss	Proto-Kra–Dai
blood	*pɤlaːc
bone	*Kudɤːk
ear	*qɤrɤː
eye	*maTaː
hand	*(C)imɤː
nose	*(ʔ)idaŋ
tongue	*(C)əmaː
tooth	*lipan
dog	*Kamaː
fish	*balaː
horn	*paquː
louse	*KuTuː
fire	*(C)apuj
stone	*KaTiːl
star	*Kadaːw
water	*(C)aNam
I (1.SG)	*akuː
thou (2.SG)	*isuː; amɤː
one	*(C)itsɤː
two	*saː
die	*maTaːj
name	*(C)adaːn
full	*pətiːk
new	*(C)amaːl

Some additional tentative Proto-Kra–Dai reconstructions by Ostapirat (2023) include the following.

Gloss	Proto-Kra–Dai
chin	*ləqaːŋ A
shoulder pole	*ləqaːn A
person	*niqun A
bitter	*təqam A (Note: cf. Biao tʰam¹ < *t-qam)
excrement	*taqiː C (Note: cf. Biao tʰai³ < *t-q-)
rice	*rəquː C
young chicken	*rəqaːŋ B
fire	*apuy A
tooth	*ipan A
rain	*kipun A
millet	*kipaːŋ C
vomit	*utaːk D
we (incl.)	*atuː A
carry on pole	*kətaːp D
break	*kətak D
pestle	*tsaːk D
sour	*qatsum C
wash	*(C)atsak D
left	*(C)itsaːy
thatch grass	*ikaː A
field dike	*ikal A
knee	*tukuː B
to crow	*tikal A
moon	*bulaːn A
flower	*baluːk D
to weed	*bəlaːy A (Note: The proto-tone is from Pittayaporn's (2009) Proto-Tai reconstruction.)
spotted	*bəlaːŋ B (Note: The proto-tone is from Pittayaporn's (2009) Proto-Tai reconstruction.)

=== Norquest (2020) ===
Norquest (2020) lists the following of his own Proto-Kra–Dai and other lower-level reconstructions.

Gloss	p-Kra-Dai	p-Lakkja	p-Kam-Sui	p-Ong-Be	p-Tai	p-Hlai
thin	*C-báːŋ	*w̥aːŋ	*C-baːŋ	*ˀbjaŋ	*C-baːŋ	–
bone	*Cudə́ːk	–	*C-ˀɖaːk	*r̥ɯk	*C-dwoːk	*Cuɾɯːk
boat	*Cuɖáː	*j̊waː	*C-ˀɖrwaː	*rwaː	*C-ɖwaː	*Cuɾaː
borrow	*C-ɟáːm	*l̥aːm	*ˀjaːm	–	*ˀjɯːm	–
village	*Cəˀbáːnʔ	*ˀbaːnʔ	*ˀbaːnʔ	–	*ˀbaːnʔ	–
winnow basket	*Cəˀdóŋʔ	*l̥oŋʔ	*ˀdɔŋʔ	*r̥oːŋ X	*ˀdoŋʔ	*ɗoŋʔ
to stand	*Cəˀɟún	*j̊uːn	*ˀɟun	*j̊un	*ˀɟɯn	*tɕuːn
dog	*kʰ[u]máː	*kʰ-mwaː	*k-hmaː	*m̥aː	*m̥aː	*hmaː
ditch	*[t]-m̥ˠáːŋ	–	*T-m̥jaːŋ	*m̥aŋ	*m̥ɯəŋ	–
ant	*r-móȶ	*mot	*r-mət	*muːʔ	*moc	*hmuȶ
bear	*kəˀmˠúj	*k-Nuːj	*ˀmjeː	–	*m̥wiː	*ˀmuj
thick	*tsəˀnáː	*ts-Naː	*ˀɳaː	*n̥aː	*n̥aː	*ˀnaː
cold	*kəˀȵít	*k-Niːt	*ˀȵit	*n̥iːt	*n̥it	–
stupid	*Cəˀŋáːŋh	*ˀŋaːŋh	*ˀŋaːŋh	*ŋ̊əːŋ X	–	–
gills	*Cəˀŋˠáːk	–	*ˀȵaːk	*ŋaːk	*ŋ̊ɯək	*ˀŋaːk
taro	*pəˀrˠáːk	*j̊aːk (< *r̥aːk)	*ˀrjaːk	*ʃaːk	*prɯək	*hraːk
moan	*gəˀráːŋ	*j̊aːŋ (< *r̥aːŋ)	*ˀraːŋ	–	*graːŋ	–
hungry	*məˀjáːk	–	*m-ˀjaːk	*j̊ak	*ˀjaːk	–
stupid	*Cəˀwáːʔ	–	*ˀwaːʔ	–	*ˀwaːʔ	–

== Lower-level reconstructions ==
Norquest (2021) provides the following lower-level reconstructions for each branch of Kra–Dai.

Gloss	p-Biao–Lakkja	p-Kam–Sui	p-Kra	p-Hlai	p-Be	p-Tai
house	*ljaːk	*r̥aːn	*qran	*hrɯːn	*raːn	*rɤːn
road	*tsaːŋ	*qʰwən	*qron	*kuːn	*ʃwən	*r̥wɤn
heavy	*N-tsak	*C-dʑan	*qχəl	*kʰɯn	*xən	*n̥ak
leg	*puk	*p-qaː	*C-qaː	*kʰok	*kok	*f-qaː
neck	*ʔən	*ʔdənʔ	*C-joː	*hljoŋʔ	*liəŋX	*ɣoː
beard	*m-luːt	*m-nrut	*mumʔ	*hmɯːmʔ	*mumX	*mumh
wet field	*raːh	*ʔraːh	*naː	*hnaːɦ	*njaː	*naː
crow	*kaː	*qaː	*ʔak	*ʔaːk	*ʔak	*kaː
needle	*tɕʰəm	*tɕʰəm	*ŋot	*hŋuc	*ŋaːʔ	*qjem
mortar	–	*krˠəm	*ʔdru	*ɾəw	*ɦoːk	*grok
tongue	*m-laː	*maː	*l-maː	*hliːnʔ	*liːnX	*linʔ
wing	–	*C-faːh	*ʀwaː	*pʰiːk	*pik	*piːk
skin	–	*ŋʀaː	*taː	*n̥əːŋ	*n̥aŋ	*n̥aŋ
to shoot	–	*pɛŋh	–	*hɲɯː	*ɲəː	*ɲɯː
to fly	*[C-]pənh	*C-pˠənʔ	–	*ɓin	*ʔbjən	*ʔbil
bee	*mlet	*luk	*reː	*kəːj	*ʃaːŋX	*prɯŋʔ
vegetable	–	*ʔmaː	*ʔop	*ɓɯː ʈʂʰəj	*ʃak	*prak
red	–	*hlaːnʔ	–	*hraːnʔ	*r̥iŋ	*C-djeːŋ
to bite	*kat	*klət	*ʈajh	*hŋaːɲʔ	*gap	*ɢɦap
to descend	*lojʔ	*C-ɭuːjh	*caɰʔ	*l̥uːj	*roːŋ	*N-ɭoŋ

Note that like Jiamao, Proto-Be does not distinguish between tone categories B and C, but rather only has an X category, which Chen (2018) names as tone category BC.

== See also ==
- Austro-Tai languages
- Old Chinese
- Proto-Austronesian language
- Proto-Hmong–Mien language
- Proto-Austroasiatic language
