= Proto-Tai language =

Reconstructed ancestor of the Tai languages

Proto-Tai
- Reconstruction of: Tai languages
- Reconstructed ancestor: Proto-Kra–Dai

Proto-Tai is the reconstructed proto-language (common ancestor) of all the Tai languages, including modern Lao, Shan, Tai Lü, Tai Dam, Ahom, Northern Thai, Standard Thai, Bouyei, and Zhuang. The Proto-Tai language is not directly attested by any surviving texts, but has been reconstructed using the comparative method.

It was reconstructed in 1977 by Li Fang-Kuei and by Pittayawat Pittayaporn in 2009.

== Phonology ==
=== Consonants ===
The following table shows the consonants of Proto-Tai according to Li Fang-Kuei's A Handbook of Comparative Tai (1977), considered the standard reference in the field. Li does not indicate the exact quality of the consonants denoted here as [tɕ, tɕʰ and dʑ], which are indicated in his work as [č, čh, ž] and described merely as palatal affricate consonants.

Proto-Tai consonants (Li 1977)
Type		Labial	Alveolar	Palatal	Velar	Glottal
Stop	Voiceless	p	t	tɕ	k	
Stop	Voiceless aspirated	pʰ	tʰ	tɕʰ	kʰ	
Stop	Voiced	b	d	dʑ	ɡ	
Stop	Glottalized	ˀb	ˀd	ˀj		ʔ
Fricative	Voiceless	f	s		x	h
Fricative	Voiced	v	z		ɣ	
Nasal	Voiceless	m̥	n̥	ɲ̊	ŋ̊	
Nasal	Voiced	m	n	ɲ	ŋ	
Liquid or semivowel	Voiceless	w̥	r̥ l̥			
Liquid or semivowel	Voiced	w	r l	j		

The table below lists the consonantal phonemes of Pittayawat Pittayaporn's reconstruction of Proto-Tai.^{: p. 70} Some of the differences are simply different interpretations of Li's consonants: the palatal consonants are interpreted as stops, rather than affricates, and the glottalized consonants are described using symbols for implosive consonants. However, Pittayaporn's Proto-Tai reconstruction has a number of real differences from Li:

1. Pittayaporn does not allow for aspirated consonants, which he reconstructs as secondary developments in Southwestern Tai languages (after Proto-Tai split up into different languages).
2. He also reconstructs a contrastive series of uvular consonants, namely */q/, */ɢ/, and */χ/. No modern dialect preserves a distinct series of uvular consonants. Pittayaporn's reconstruction of the sounds is based on irregular correspondences in differing modern Tai dialects among the sounds /kʰ/, /x/ and /h/, in particular in the Phuan language and the Kapong dialect of the Phu Thai language. The distinction between /kʰ/ and /x/ can be reconstructed from the Tai Dón language. However, words with /x/ in Tai Dón show three different types of correspondences in Phuan and Kapong Phu Thai: some have /kʰ/ in both languages, some have /h/ in both, and some have /kʰ/ in Phuan but /h/ in Kapong Phu Thai. Pittayaporn reconstructs the correspondence classes as reflecting Proto-Tai /x/, /χ/ and /q/, respectively.

There is a total of 33–36 consonants, 10–11 consonantal syllable codas and 25–26 tautosyllabic consonant clusters.

Proto-Tai consonants (Pittayaporn 2009)
Type		Labial	Alveolar	Palatal	Velar	Uvular	Glottal
Stop	Voiceless	p	t	c	k	q	
Stop	Voiced	b	d	ɟ	ɡ	ɢ	
Stop	Glottalized	ɓ	ɗ	ˀj			ʔ
Fricative	Voiceless		s	(ɕ)	x	χ	h
Fricative	Voiced		z	(ʑ)	ɣ		
Nasal	Voiceless	m̥	n̥	ɲ̊	(ŋ̊)		
Nasal	Voiced	m	n	ɲ	ŋ		
Liquid or semivowel	Voiceless	w̥	r̥ l̥				
Liquid or semivowel	Voiced	w	r l				

Tai languages have many fewer possible consonants in coda position than in initial position. Li (and most other researchers) construct a Proto-Tai coda inventory that is identical with the system in modern Thai.

Proto-Tai consonantal syllabic codas (Li 1977)
Type	Labial	Alveolar	Palatal	Velar	Glottal
Stop	-p	-t		-k	-ʔ
Nasal	-m	-n		-ŋ	
semivowel	-w		-j		

Pittayaporn's Proto-Tai reconstructed consonantal syllable codas also include *-l, *-c, and possibly *-ɲ, which are not included in most prior reconstructions of Proto-Tai.^{: p. 193} Below is the consonantal syllabic coda inventory:

Proto-Tai consonantal syllabic codas (Pittayaporn 2009)
Type	Labial	Alveolar	Palatal	Velar
Stop	-p	-t	-c	-k
Nasal	-m	-n	(-ɲ)	-ŋ
Liquid or semivowel	-w	-l	-j	

Norquest (2021) reconstructs the voiceless retroflex stop /ʈ/ for Proto-Tai. Examples of voiceless retroflex stops in Proto-Tai:

Gloss	proto-Tai	p-North Tai	p-Central Tai	p-Southwest Tai
‘lift’	*ʈaːm	*r̥aːm	*tʰraːm	*haːm
‘head louse’	*ʈaw	*r̥aw	*tʰraw	*haw
‘to see’	*ʈaȵ	*r̥aȵ	*tʰran	*hen
‘eye’	*p-ʈaː	*p-ʈaː	*p-tʰraː	*taː
‘die’	*p-ʈaːj	*p-ʈaːj	*p-tʰraːj	*taːj
‘grasshopper’	*p-ʈak	*p-ʈak	*p-tʰrak	*tak

Norquest (2021) also reconstructs a series of breathy voiced initials (*bʱ, *dʱ, *ɡʱ, *ɢʱ) for Proto-Tai. Examples of breathy voiced initials in Proto-Tai:

Gloss	proto-Tai	p-North Tai	p-Central Tai	p-Southwest Tai
‘person’	*bʱuːʔ	*buːʔ	*pʰuːʔ	*pʰuːʔ
‘bowl’	*dʱuəjʔ	*duəjʔ	*tʰuəjʔ	*tʰuəjʔ
‘eggplant’	*ɡʱɯə	*gɯə	*kʰɯə	*kʰɯə
‘rice’	*ɢʱawʔ	*ɣawʔ	*kʰawʔ	*kʰawʔ

Some sound correspondences among Proto-Tai, Proto-Northern Tai, and Proto-Southern Tai (i.e., the ancestor of the Central and Southwestern Tai languages) uvular initials given in Ostapirat (2023) are as follows.

p-Tai	p-Northern Tai	p-Southern Tai
*q-	*k-	*x-
*ɢ-	*ɣ-	*g-
*ɢʰ-	*ɣ-	*kʰ-

Initial velar correspondences, on the other hand, are identical.

p-Tai	p-Northern Tai	p-Southern Tai
*x-	*x-	*x-
*ɣ-	*ɣ-	*ɣ-

=== Consonant clusters ===
Li (1977) reconstructs the following initial clusters:

Proto-Tai consonant clusters (Li 1977)
Type	Labial	Alveolar	Velar
Unvoiced Stop	pr-, pl-	tr-, tl-	kr-, kl-, kw-
Aspirated unvoiced stop	pʰr-, pʰl-	tʰr-, tʰl-	kʰr-, kʰl-, kʰw-
Voiced Stop	br-, bl-	dr-, dl-	ɡr-, ɡl-, ɡw-
Implosive	ʔbr-, ʔbl-	ʔdr-, ʔdl-	
Voiceless Fricative	fr-		xr-, xw-
Voiced Fricative	vr-, vl-		
Nasal	mr-, ml-	nr-, nl-	ŋr-, ŋl-, ŋw-
Liquid			

Pittayaporn (2009) reconstructs two types of complex onsets for Proto-Tai:

1. Tautosyllabic clusters – considered one syllable.
2. Sesquisyllabic clusters – "one-and-a-half" syllables. ("Sesquisyllabic" is a term coined by James Matisoff.) However, sesquisyllabic clusters are not attested in any modern Tai language.

Tautosyllabic consonant clusters from Pittayaporn^{: p. 139} are given below, some of which have the medials *-r-, *-l-, and *-w-.

Proto-Tai consonant clusters (Pittayaporn 2009)
Type	Labial	Alveolar	Palatal	Velar	Uvular
Unvoiced Stop	pr-, pl-, pw-	tr-, tw-	cr-	kr-, kl-, kw-	qr-, qw-
Implosive	br-, bl-, bw-			ɡr-, (ɡl-)	ɢw-
Fricative		sw-		xw-, ɣw-	
Nasal	ʰmw-	nw-	ɲw-	ŋw-	
Liquid		ʰrw-, rw-			

Pittayaporn's Proto-Tai reconstruction also has sesquisyllabic consonant clusters. Michel Ferlus (1990) had also previously proposed sesquisyllables for Proto-Thai-Yay. The larger Tai-Kadai family is reconstructed with disyllabic words that ultimately collapsed to monosyllabic words in the modern Tai languages. However, irregular correspondences among certain words (especially in the minority non-Southwestern-Tai languages) suggest to Pittayaporn that Proto-Tai had only reached the sesquisyllabic stage (with a main monosyllable and optional preceding minor syllable). The subsequent reduction to monosyllables occurred independently in different branches, with the resulting apparent irregularities in synchronic languages reflecting Proto-Tai sesquisyllables.

Examples of sesquisyllables include:

Voiceless stop + voiceless stop (*C̥.C̥-)

- *p.t-
- *k.t-
- *p.q-
- *q.p-

Voiceless obstruent + voiced stop (*C̥.C̬-)

- *C̥.b-
- *C̥.d-

Voiced obstruent + voiceless stop (*C̬.C̥-)

- *C̬.t-
- *C̬.k-
- *C̬.q-

Voiceless stops + liquids/glides (*C̥.r-)

- *k.r-
- *p.r-
- *C̥.w-

Voiced consonant + liquid/glide

- *m.l-
- *C̬ .r-
- *C̬ .l-

Clusters with non-initial nasals

- *t.n-
- *C̬ .n-

Other clusters include *r.t-, *t.h-, *q.s-, *m.p-, *s.c-, *z.ɟ-, *g.r-, *m.n-; *gm̩.r-, *ɟm̩ .r-, *c.pl-, *g.lw-; etc.

=== Vowels ===
Below are Proto-Tai vowels from Pittayaporn.^{: p. 192} Unlike Li's system, Pittayaporn's system has vowel length contrast. There is a total of 7 vowels with length contrast and 5 diphthongs.

Proto-Tai vowels (Pittayaporn 2009)
Type	Front		Back			
Type	unrounded		unrounded		rounded	
Type	short	long	short	long	short	long
Close	/i/	/iː/	/ɯ/	/ɯː/	/u/	/uː/
Mid	/e/	/eː/	/ɤ/	/ɤː/	/o/	/oː/
Open			/a/	/aː/		

The diphthongs from Pittayaporn (2009) are:

- Rising: */iə/, */ɯə/, */uə/
- Falling: */ɤɰ/, */aɰ/

=== Tones ===
Proto-Tai had three contrasting tones on syllables ending with sonorant finals ("live syllables"), and no tone contrast on syllables with obstruent finals ("dead syllables"). This is very similar to the situation in Middle Chinese. For convenience in tracking historical outcomes, Proto-Tai is usually described as having four tones, namely *A, *B, *C, and *D, where *D is a non-phonemic tone automatically assumed by all dead syllables. These tones can be further split into a voiceless (*A1 [1], *B1 [3], *C1 [5], *D1 [7]) and voiced (*A2 [2], *B2 [4], *C2 [6], *D2 [8]) series. The *D tone can also be split into the *DS (short vowel) and *DL (long vowel) tones. With voicing contrast, these would be *DS1 [7], *DS2 [8], *DL1 [9], and *DL2 [10]. Other Kra–Dai languages are transcribed with analogous conventions.

Proto-Tai tone notation
Type of voicing	*A	*B	*C	*D
Voiceless series (Letter notation)	A1	B1	C1	D1
Voiceless series (Numerical notation)	1	3	5	7
Voiced series (Letter notation)	A2	B2	C2	D2
Voiced series (Numerical notation)	2	4	6	8

The following table of the phonetic characteristics of Proto-Tai tones was adapted from Pittayaporn.^{: p. 271} Note that *B and *D are phonetically similar.

Proto-Tai tonal characteristics (Pittayaporn 2009)
Type	*A	*B	*C	*D
Type of final	sonorant	sonorant	sonorant	obstruent
Pitch height	mid	low	high	low
Contour	level	low rising	high falling	low rising
Vowel duration	–	long	short	–
Voice quality	modal	creaky	glottal constriction	–

Proto-Tai tones take on various tone values and contours in modern Tai languages. These tonal splits are determined by the following conditions:

1. "Friction sounds": Aspirated onset, voiceless fricative, voiceless sonorant
2. Unaspirated onset (voiceless)
3. Glottalized/implosive onset (voiceless)
4. Voiced onset

In addition, William J. Gedney developed a "tone-box" method to help determine historical tonal splits and mergers in modern Tai languages. There is a total of 20 possible slots in what is known as the Gedney's Tone Box.

Gedney Box template
Type	*A	*B	*C	*DS	*DL
Voiceless (friction)	A1	B1	C1	DS1	DL1
Voiceless (unaspirated)	A1	B1	C1	DS1	DL1
Voiceless (glottalized)	A1	B1	C1	DS1	DL1
Voiced	A2	B2	C2	DS2	DL2

Proto-Tai tones correspond regularly to Middle Chinese tones. (Note that Old Chinese did not have tones.) The following tonal correspondences are from Luo (2008). Note that Proto-Tai tone *B corresponds to Middle Chinese tone C, and vice versa.

Sinitic–Tai tonal correspondences
Proto-Tai Tone	Notes (Written Thai orthography)	Middle Chinese Tone	Chinese name	Notes (Middle Chinese)
*A	Unmarked	A	平 Level (Even)	Unmarked
*B	Marked by -่ (mai ek)	C	去 Departing	Marked by -H in Baxter's notation (mai tho), historically perhaps from [-s] later [-h]
*C	Marked by -้ (mai tho)	B	上 Rising	Marked by -X in Baxter's notation, historically perhaps from [-ʔ]
*D	Unmarked or marked by -๊ (mai tri)	D	入 Entering	Marked by -p, -t, -k

Gedney (1972) also included a list of diagnostic words to determine tonal values, splits, and mergers for particular Tai languages. At least three diagnostic words are needed for each cell of the Gedney Box. The diagnostic words preceding the semicolons are from Gedney (1972), and the ones following the semicolons are from Somsonge (2012) and Jackson, et al. (2012). Standard Thai (Siamese) words are given below, with italicised transcriptions.

Diagnostic words for Tai tones
Type	*A	*B	*C	*DS	*DL
1: Voiceless (friction)	huu หู ear, khaa ขา leg, hua หัว head; sɔɔŋ สอง two, maa หมา dog	khay ไข่ egg, phaa ผ่า to split, khaw เข่า knee; may ใหม่ new, sii สี่ four	khaaw ข้าว rice, sɨa เสื้อ shirt, khaa ฆ่า to kill, khay ไข้ fever, haa ห้า five; thuay ถ้วย cup, mɔɔ หม้อ pot, naa หน้า face, to wait	mat หมัด flea, suk สุก cooked/ripe, phak ผัก vegetable; hok หก six, sip สิบ ten	khaat ขาด broken/torn, ŋɨak เหงือก gums, haap หาบ to carry on a shoulder pole; khuat ขวด bottle, phuuk ผูก to tie, sɔɔk ศอก elbow, khɛɛk แขก guest, fruit
2: Voiceless (unaspirated)	pii ปี year, taa ตา eye, kin กิน to eat; kaa กา teapot, plaa ปลา fish	paa ป่า forest, kay ไก่ chicken, kɛɛ แก่ old; taw เต่า turtle, paw เป่า to blow, pii ปี flute, short (height)	paa ป้า aunt (elder), klaa กล้า rice seedlings, tom ต้ม to boil; kaw เก้า nine, klay ใกล้ near, short (length)	kop กบ frog, tap ตับ liver, cep เจ็บ to hurt; pet เป็ด duck, tok ตก to fall/drop	pɔɔt ปอด lung, piik ปีก wing, tɔɔk ตอก to pound; pɛɛt แปด eight, paak ปาก mouth, taak ตาก to dry in the sun, to embrace
3: Voiceless (glottalized)	bin บิน to fly, dɛɛŋ แดง red, daaw ดาว star; bay ใบ leaf, nose	baa บ่า shoulder, baaw บ่าว young man, daa ด่า to scold; ʔim อิ่ม full, (water) spring	baan บ้าน village, baa บ้า crazy, ʔaa อ้า to open (mouth); ʔɔy อ้อย sugarcane, daam ด้าม handle, daay ด้าย string	bet เบ็ด fishhook, dip ดิบ raw/unripe, ʔok อก chest; dɨk ดึก late, to extinguish	dɛɛt แดด sunshine, ʔaap อาบ to bathe, dɔɔk ดอก flower; ʔɔɔk ออก exit
4: Voiced	mɨɨ มือ hand, khwaay ควาย water buffalo, naa นา ricefield; ŋuu งู snake, house	phii พี่ older sibling, phɔɔ พ่อ father, ray ไร่ dry field; naŋ นั่ง to sit, lɨay เลื่อย to saw, ashes, urine, beard	nam น้ำ water, nɔɔŋ น้อง younger sibling, may ไม้ wood, maa ม้า horse; lin ลิ้น tongue, thɔɔŋ ท้อง belly	nok นก bird, mat มัด to tie up, lak ลัก to steal; sak ซัก to wash (clothes), mot มด ant, lep เล็บ nail	miit มีด knife, luuk ลูก (one's) child, lɨat เลือด blood, nɔɔk นอก outside; chɨak เชือก rope, raak ราก root, nasal mucus, to pull

Note that the diagnostic words listed above cannot all be used for other Tai-Kadai branches such as Kam–Sui, since tones in other branches may differ. The table below illustrates these differences among Tai and Kam–Sui etyma.

Tai vs. Kam–Sui tones
Gloss	Tai	Kam–Sui
pig	A1	B1
dog	A1	A1
rat	A1	C1
ricefield	A2 (na)	B1 (ja)
tongue	A2 (lin)	A2 (ma)

=== Proto-Southern Kra-Dai ===
In 2007, Peter K. Norquest undertook a preliminary reconstruction of Proto-Southern Kra-Dai, which is ancestral to the Hlai languages, Ong Be language, and Tai languages. There are 28 consonants, 5–7 vowels, 9 closed rimes (not including vowel length), and at least 1 diphthong, *ɯa(C).

Proto-Southern Kra-Dai consonants Norquest (2007)
Type	Labial	Alveolar	Retroflex	Palatal	Velar	Uvular	Glottal
Unvoiced Stop	(C-)p	(C-)t	ʈ	(C-)c	(C-)k	(C-)q	(Cu)ʔ
Voiced Stop	(C-)b	(Ci/u)d	(Cu)ɖ	(C-)ɟ	(Ci/u)g	(C-ɢ)	
Unvoiced Fricative	f	s		ɕ	x		h
Voiced Fricative	(C[i])v	z			ɣ		
Voiced Nasal	(H-)m	(H-)n		ɲ	(H-)ŋ(w)		
Liquid or Semivowel	(H-)w, j	(H-)l, r					

Proto-Southern Kra-Dai medial consonants also include:

- *C^{(V)}-m
- *C^{(V)}-n
- *C^{(V)}-ɲ
- *C^{(V)}-ŋ
- *C^{(V)}(i)l
- *C(u)r
- *p(i)l
- *k-l

Proto-Southern Kra-Dai open rimes Norquest (2007)
Height	Front	Central	Back
Close	/iː/	/ɯː/	/uː/
Mid	(/eː/)		(/oː/)
Open	/ɛː/	/aː/	

Proto-Southern Kra-Dai closed rimes Norquest (2007)
Height	Front	Central	Back
Close	/i(ː)C/	/ɯ(ː)C/	/u(ː)C/
Mid	/e(ː)C/	/ə(ː)C/	/o(ː)C/
Open	/ɛːC/	/aːC/	/ɔC/

Proto-Southern Kra-Dai also includes the diphthong *ɯa(C).

=== Syllable structure ===
Unlike its modern-day monosyllabic descendants, Proto-Tai was a sesquisyllabic language (Pittayaporn 2009). Below are some possible Proto-Tai syllable shapes from Pittayaporn.^{: p. 64}

Proto-Tai syllable structure (Pittayaporn 2009)
Type	Open syllable	Closed syllable
Monosyllable	*C(C)(C)V(:)^{T}	*C(C)(C)V(:)C^{T}
Sesquisyllable	*C(C).C(C)(C)V(:)^{T}	*C(C).C(C)(C)V(:)C^{T}

Legend:

- C = consonant
- V = vowel
- (:) = optional vowel length
- ^{T} = tone

During the evolution from Proto-Tai to modern Tai languages, monosyllabification involved a series of five steps.^{: p. 181}

1. Weakening (segment becomes less "consonant-like")
2. Implosivization
3. Metathesis
4. Assimilation
5. Simplification (syllable drops at least one constituent)

== Morphology ==
Robert M. W. Dixon (1998) suggests that the Proto-Tai language was fusional in its morphology because of related sets of words among the language's descendants that appear to be related through ablaut.

== Syntax ==
Proto-Tai had a SVO (subject–verb–object) word order like Chinese and almost all modern Tai languages. Its syntax was heavily influenced by Chinese.

== Lexical isoglosses ==
Examples of Kra-Hlai-Tai isoglosses as identified by Norquest (2021):

Gloss	p-Tai	p-Be	p-Hlai	p-Kra	p-Kam-Sui	p-Biao-Lakkja
‘beard’	*mumh	*mumX	*hmɯːmʔ	*mumʔ	*m-nrut	*m-luːt
‘wet field’	*naː	*njaː	*hnaːɦ	*naː	*ʔraːh	*raːh
‘crow’	*kaː	*ʔak	*ʔaːk	*ʔak	*qaː	*kaː
‘needle’	*qjem	*ŋaːʔ	*hŋuc	*ŋot	*tɕʰəm	*tɕʰəm
‘mortar’	*grok	*ɦoːk	*ɾəw	*ʔdru	*krˠəm	–

Examples of Hlai-Be-Tai isoglosses as identified by Norquest (2021):

Gloss	p-Tai	p-Be	p-Hlai	p-Kra	p-Kam-Sui	p-Biao-Lakkja
‘tongue’	*linʔ	*liːnX	*hliːnʔ	*l-maː	*maː	*m-laː
‘wing’	*piːk	*pik	*pʰiːk	*ʀwaː	*C-faːh	–
‘skin’	*n̥aŋ	*n̥aŋ	*n̥əːŋ	*taː	*ŋʀaː	–
‘to shoot’	*ɲɯː	*ɲəː	*hɲɯː	–	*pɛŋh	–
‘to fly’	*ʔbil	*ʔbjən	*ɓin	–	*C-pˠənʔ	*[C-]pənh

Examples of Be-Tai isoglosses as identified by Norquest (2021):

Gloss	p-Tai	p-Be	p-Hlai	p-Kra	p-Kam-Sui	p-Biao-Lakkja
‘bee’	*prɯŋʔ	*ʃaːŋX	*kəːj	*reː	*luk	*mlet
‘vegetable’	*prak	*ʃak	*ɓɯː ʈʂʰəj	*ʔop	*ʔmaː	–
‘red’	*C-djeːŋ	*r̥iŋ	*hraːnʔ	–	*hlaːnʔ	–
‘to bite’	*ɢɦap	*gap	*hŋaːɲʔ	*ʈajh	*klət	*kat
‘to descend’	*N-ɭoŋ	*roːŋ	*l̥uːj	*caɰʔ	*C-ɭuːjh	*lojʔ

== Proto-Tai prenasalized nasals and Old Chinese ==
Ostapirat (2023) notes that as in Proto-Hmong–Mien, prenasalized consonant initials in Proto-Tai often correspond with prenasalized consonant initials in Old Chinese (with the Old Chinese reconstructions below from Baxter & Sagart 2014).

Gloss	Proto-Tai	Old Chinese
collapse	*mbaŋ A	崩 *Cə.pˤəŋ
daughter-in-law	*mbaɰ C	婦 *mə.bəʔ
bet	*ndaː C	賭 *mə.tˤaʔ
ford	*ndaː B	渡 *[d]ˤak-s
price	*ŋgaː B	價 *mə.qˤaʔ-s (?)
hold in mouth	*ŋgam A	含 *Cə-m-kˤ[ə]m
early	*ndʑaw C	早 *Nə.tsˤuʔ

== See also ==
- List of Proto-Tai reconstructions (Wiktionary)
- Proto-Kra language
- Proto-Hlai language
- Proto-Austronesian language
- Austro-Tai languages
