= Proto-Kra language =

Reconstructed ancestor of the Kra languages

Proto-Kra
- Reconstruction of: Kra languages
- Region: South China
- Reconstructed ancestor: Proto-Kra–Dai

Proto-Kra is the reconstructed ancestor of the Kra languages. It was reconstructed in 2000 by Weera Ostapirat in his Ph.D. dissertation.

== Lower-level reconstructions ==
Ostapirat (2000) provided preliminary phonological reconstructions for several lower-level groupings before attempting a reconstruction of Proto-Kra.

- Proto-Kra
  - Proto-South-Western Kra
    - Proto-Western Kra (Gelao, Lachi)
    - Proto-Southern Kra (Laha)
  - Proto-Central-East Kra
    - Proto-Central Kra (Paha)
    - Proto-Eastern Kra (Buyang, Qabiao)

== Phonology ==
=== Consonants ===
Proto-Kra has a total of 32 consonants, seven of which (marked in green) can occur as syllable finals (Ostapirat 2000:224, 236).

Proto-Kra consonants
		Labial	Alveolar	Postalveolar	Retroflex	Palatal	Velar	Glottal
Nasal		m	n		ɳ	ɲ	ŋ	
Plosive	Voiceless	p	t		ʈ	c	k	ʔ
Plosive	Voiced	b	d		ɖ	ɟ	ɡ	
Affricate	Voiceless		ts	tʃ	ʈʂ			
Affricate	Voiced		dz	dʒ	ɖʐ			
Fricative	Voiceless		s	ʃ			x	
Fricative	Voiced		z	ʒ			ɣ	
Approximant		w	l			j		
Trill			r					

=== Miyake (2008, 2021) ===
Marc Miyake (2008, 2021) proposes alternative reconstructions for Ostapirat's (2000) Proto-Kra retroflex consonants, suggesting that many of them were actually non-retroflexes that had been influenced by pre-syllables, in particular with alveolar consonants leniting in intervocalic position. In synchronic Kra languages, reflexes are often attested as voiced fricatives, which Miyake (2021) does not believe to have developed from historical initial retroflex consonants. Some examples of Miyake's (2008) revised Proto-Kra reconstructions are provided below.

- *tsəm 'one' (Ostapirat's Proto-Kra *tʂəm^{C})
- *tsun 'teach' (Ostapirat's Proto-Kra *tʂun^{A})
- *N-tsu 'pillar' (Ostapirat's Proto-Kra *m-tʂu^{A})
- *nok 'bird' (Ostapirat's Proto-Kra *ɳok^{D})
- *nui 'snow' (Ostapirat's Proto-Kra *ɳui^{A})
- *nəl 'fat' (Ostapirat's Proto-Kra *(m-)ɳəl^{A})
- *CV-nəŋh 'salty' (Ostapirat's Proto-Kra *ʔ-ɳəŋ^{B})
- *na 'thick' (Ostapirat's Proto-Kra *C-na^{A})
- *nak 'give' (Ostapirat's Proto-Kra *nak^{D})
- *klep 'fingernail' (Ostapirat's Proto-Kra *ʈ-lep^{D})
- *(k/tV-)loŋ 'vegetable' (Ostapirat's Proto-Kra *ɖ-loŋ^{A})

Miyake (2021) reconstructs some disyllabic lexical forms for Proto-Kra, including *mata^{A} 'eye', *manok^{D} 'bird', and *kVtu^{A1} 'louse'.

Additionally, Miyake (2008) revises Ostapirat's Proto-Kra *pwl- as *CV-pl-, *bwl- as *CV-bl-, *m-pl- as *pl-, *(p/d/k)-l- as *(p/d/k)V-l-, *ʈ-l- as k-l-, and *ɖ-l- as *(k/tV)-l-. Proto-Kra consonants in Miyake (2021) as compared to Ostapirat (2000) are:

Ostapirat (2000)	Miyake (2021)
*ʈ-	*CVt-
*ɖ-	*CVd-
*ɳ-	*CVn-
*ɭ-	*CVl-
*d-l-	*CVl-
*tʂ-	*CVts-
*dʐ-	*CVdz-
*hr-	*hr-
*r-	*r-

=== Vowels ===
Proto-Kra has a total of 6 vowels (Ostapirat 2000:235).

Proto-Kra vowels
Height	Front	Central	Back
Close	i		u
Mid	e	ə	o
Open		a	

Proto-Kra has 4 diphthongs, which are not found in closed syllables.

- *-ai
- *-aɯ
- *-ui
- *-au

=== Tones ===
Proto-Kra had an A–B–C–D tonal system typical of other Tai–Kadai languages (see Proto-Tai language#Tones). The tonal descriptions below are from Ostapirat (2000:237).

1. *A: *A is one of the most common tones.
2. *B: *B and *D are phonetically similar, as reflexes of tone *D are often the same as those of *B. This regularly occurs in all Kra languages except for Qabiao.
3. *C: *C is usually accompanied by glottal constriction and may have originally had a creaky or tense laryngeal quality. Some Gelao varieties and Yalang Buyang display the same reflex for *B and *C.
4. *D: *D is the only tone to occur exclusively in closed syllables.

The following table of phonetic characteristics of Proto-Kra tones was adapted from Ostapirat (2000:237).

Proto-Kra Tonal Characteristics
	*A	*B	*C	*D
Type of final	sonorants, vowels	lax larynx (?)	tense larynx	stops
Voicing	voiced	unvoiced	unvoiced	unvoiced
Vocal cords	vibrating	wide open	closed	closed
Vowel duration	long	medium	short	medium

== Lexicon ==
Below are reconstructed Proto-Kra forms from Ostapirat (2000).

Body parts and bodily functions

- *tai^{C} 'armpit (1)'
- *lje^{A} 'armpit (2)'
- *mum^{C} 'beard'
- *hmok^{D} 'belly'
- *plat^{D} 'blood (1)'
- *kɣa^{C} 'blood (2)'
- *plaɯ^{C} 'boil (n.)'
- *dək^{D} 'bone'
- *m-la^{B} 'cheek/face'
- *tək^{D} 'chest'
- *kaŋ^{C} 'chin'
- *k-ra^{A} 'ear'
- *kai^{C} 'excrement (1)'
- *ʔik^{D} 'excrement (2)'
- *m-ʈa^{A} 'eye'
- *C-tot^{D} 'fart'
- *ʈ-lep^{D} 'fingernail'
- *kok^{D} 'foot'
- *C-dəŋ^{A} 'forehead'
- *m-di^{A} 'gall bladder'
- *mot^{D} 'hair'
- *m-səm^{A} 'hair (head)'
- *mja^{A} 'hand'
- *krai^{B} 'head'
- *hlul^{C} 'heart'
- *C-si^{C} 'intestine'
- *C-ku^{B} 'knee'
- *C-ka^{A} 'leg'
- *təp^{D} 'liver'
- *ʔaɯ^{C} 'meat'
- *ŋuŋ^{A} 'mouth (1)'
- *mul^{B} 'mouth (2)'
- *m-ɖaɯ^{A} 'navel'
- *C-jo^{A} 'neck'
- *hŋət^{D} 'nose (1)'
- *teŋ^{C} 'nose (2)'
- *hŋwu^{B} 'pus'
- *t-ru^{B} 'saliva'
- *m-ba^{B} 'shoulder'
- *kwau^{B} 'skin (1)'
- *ta^{A} 'skin (2)'
- *boŋ^{A} 'skin (3)'
- *hloŋ^{A} 'stomach'
- *ʒa^{C} 'tear (n.)'
- *ɣwjən^{A} 'tendon (1)'
- *ŋen^{A} 'tendon (2)'
- *t-roŋ^{A} 'throat (1)'
- *kɣe^{A} 'throat (2)'
- *l-ma^{A} 'tongue'
- *l-pən^{A} 'tooth (1)'
- *C-tʃuŋ^{A} 'tooth (2)'
- *t-lu^{C} 'waist'

Animals

- *mot^{D} 'ant'
- *C-me^{A} 'bear'
- *re^{A} 'bee'
- *ɳok^{D} 'bird'
- *kwai^{A} 'buffalo'
- *ku^{C} 'cat (wild)'
- *ki^{A} 'chicken'
- *ni^{A} 'cow'
- *d-rat^{D} 'crab'
- *ʔak^{D} 'crow (n.)'
- *dit^{D} 'deer'
- *x-ma^{A} 'dog'
- *blaɯ^{A} 'duck (1)'
- *kap^{D} 'duck (2)'
- *ʈəm^{A} 'egg'
- *p-la^{A} 'fish'
- *x-mət^{D} 'flea'
- *me^{C} 'goat'
- *d-laŋ^{C} 'hawk'
- *C-ku^{A} 'horn'
- *ŋja^{C} 'horse'
- *C-ʈu^{A} 'louse (head)'
- *m-drəl^{A} 'louse (body)'
- *kʒət^{D} 'maggot'
- *tai^{C} 'monkey (1)'
- *krok^{D} 'monkey (2)'
- *m-lu^{A} 'monkey (gibbon)'
- *dʒaŋ^{A} 'mosquito'
- *x-mu^{A} 'pig'
- *hlai^{C} 'rat'
- *tʃui^{A} 'shellfish'
- *C-tʃot^{D} 'tail'
- *ŋa^{A} 'snake'
- *(k-)di^{A} 'tiger'
- *gwja^{A} 'wing'

Plants

- *tok^{D} 'banana'
- *m-te^{C} 'beans'
- *m-pwa^{B} 'bran'
- *ka^{A} 'cogon grass'
- *m-tiŋ^{A} 'cucumber'
- *C-kən^{A} 'ear of grain'
- *hŋa^{C} 'flower (1)'
- *bal^{A} 'flower (2)'
- *C-mak^{D} 'fruit'
- *C-sui^{B} 'garlic (1)'
- *kɣa^{A} 'garlic (2)'
- *kɣiŋ^{A} 'ginger'
- *t-laɯ^{A} 'grass/tobacco'
- *ɖiŋ^{A} 'leaf'
- *l-ka^{A} 'mushroom'
- *ca^{A} 'paddy (grain)'
- *m-pləŋ^{A} 'peach'
- *mla(ɯ)^{C} 'rice (cooked)'
- *sal^{A} 'rice (husked)'
- *kʒaŋ^{A} 'rice'
- *tsaŋ^{A} 'root'
- *pe^{A} 'seed'
- *l-ŋa^{A} 'sesame'
- *ʒaŋ^{A} 'sorghum'
- *p-ɣak^{D} 'taro (1)'
- *rwau^{C} 'taro (2)'
- *ŋjan^{C} 'thorn'
- *ti^{A} 'tree'
- *ɖ-loŋ^{A} 'vegetable (1)'
- *ʔop^{D} 'vegetable (2)'
- *məl^{A} 'yam'

Nature

- *m-tu^{B1} 'ash'
- *la^{B} 'coal'
- *muk^{D} 'cloud/fog'
- *lu^{B} 'earth'
- *ʔut^{D} 'earth (soil/mud)'
- *na^{A} 'field (wet)'
- *za^{C} 'field (dry)'
- *pui^{A} 'fire'
- *sui^{A} 'firewood'
- *l-me^{A} 'frost'
- *tsep^{D} 'hail'
- *kjəl^{C} 'iron'
- *m-ɖjan^{A} 'moon (1)'
- *(C-)tjan^{A} 'moon (2)'
- *dʐu^{A} 'mountain'
- *mon^{A} 'rain'
- *jəl^{A} 'rain'
- *kron^{A} 'road'
- *t-la^{B} 'rock (1)'
- *ʔuŋ^{A} 'rock (2)'
- *p-ra^{A} 'rock (3)'
- *hŋai^{A} 'sand'
- *praɯ^{B} 'silver (1)'
- *ŋjən^{A} 'silver (2)'
- *m-kwən^{A} 'smoke'
- *ɳui^{A} 'snow'
- *d-luŋ^{A} 'star'
- *t-laŋ^{A} 'sunlight'
- *(l-)wən^{A} 'sun'
- *ʔuŋ^{C} 'water'
- *gwjən^{A} 'wind'

Material culture

- *kwan^{A} 'ax'
- *da^{A} 'boat'
- *dzaɯ^{B/C} 'chopsticks'
- *C-ʃe^{A} 'comb'
- *trau^{C} 'den/nest'
- *x-ŋo^{A} 'door'
- *d-luŋ^{A} 'drum'
- *t-lop^{D} 'hat (bamboo)'
- *kran^{A} 'house'
- *kwli^{A} 'ladder (1)'
- *kɣuŋ^{A} 'ladder (2)'
- *plu^{A} 'liquor (1)'
- *C-ka^{C} 'liquor (2)'
- *t-laɯ^{A} 'medicine'
- *dru^{A} 'mortar'
- *ŋlot^{D} 'needle'
- *tsak^{D} 'pestle'
- *m-tʂu^{A} 'pillar'
- *hɲe^{A} 'pillow'
- *C-ʃak^{D} 'rope'
- *ɲo^{A} 'salt'
- *gwaŋ^{A} 'sieve'
- *ʔen^{C} 'skirt'
- *ʒun^{B} 'thread'
- *mɣai^{A} 'village'

Kinship and pronouns

- *tai^{A} 'brother (elder)'
- *ʒaɯ^{B} 'brother (younger)'
- *lak^{D} 'child'
- *ba^{A} 'father'
- *pa^{B1} 'father'
- *m-li^{B} 'female-in-law'
- *klal^{A} 'grandchild'
- *m-pau^{B} 'grandfather'
- *ja^{C} 'grandmother'
- *ku^{A} 'I (1)'
- *ʔe^{A} 'I (2)'
- *C-paɯ^{C} 'male/husband'
- *se^{A} 'male/husband'
- *dʒu^{C} 'male-in-law'
- *mai^{C} 'mother'
- *n(ʒ)i^{A} 'name'
- *bɣuŋ^{C} 'orphan'
- *pi^{C} 'sister (elder)'
- *ʔon^{C} 'sister (younger)'
- *ŋun^{A} 'spirit'
- *r-maŋ^{A} 'spirit'
- *ʒan^{A} 'strength'
- *t-ɣu^{A} 'we'
- *ʔ-nau^{A/C} 'who'
- *mə^{A/B} 'you'

Adjectives

- *kəm^{A} 'bitter'
- *hl/dəm^{A} 'black'
- *ʔaŋ^{C} 'bright'
- *ŋəl^{C} 'deaf'
- *(h)lək^{D} 'deep'
- *r-me^{A} 'drunk'
- *kʒa^{B} 'dry'
- *k-li^{A} 'far'
- *(m-)ɳəl^{A} 'fat'
- *m-tik^{D} 'full'
- *ʔai^{A} 'good'
- *kʒəl^{A} 'heavy'
- *piŋ^{C} 'hot'
- *dok^{D} 'itchy'
- *pren^{A} 'lazy'
- *kʒa^{C} 'light (not heavy)'
- *ri^{C} 'long'
- *ʔi^{B} 'many'
- *d-la^{C} 'near'
- *mal^{A} 'new'
- *ku^{B} 'old (1)'
- *kja^{C/B} 'old (2)'
- *(k-)ɖep^{D} 'raw'
- *ŋ(w)a^{B} 'real'
- *hŋwu^{B} 'ripe'
- *roŋ^{B} 'rotten'
- *ʔ-ɳəŋ^{B} 'salty'
- *tʃi^{B} 'satiated'
- *ɖjel^{C/B} 'shallow'
- *hɲan^{C} 'short (not long 1)'
- *ti^{C} 'short (not long 2)'
- *ta^{B/C} 'short (not tall)'
- *gjaɯ^{C} 'skinny'
- *bwlat^{D} 'sour'
- *ʔet^{D} 'small'
- *mu^{B} 'smelly'
- *tjel^{C} 'sweet'
- *k-ɣwaŋ^{A} 'tall'
- *C-na^{A} 'thick'
- *ɣwə^{C} 'thin'
- *tu^{C} 'warm (1)'
- *ʔun^{B} 'warm (2)'
- *rək^{D} 'wet'
- *r-ʔuk^{D} 'white'
- *C-ŋil^{C} 'yellow'

Verbs

- *p-la^{A} 'afraid'
- *pluŋ^{C} 'alive'
- *tsi^{C} 'ask'
- *m-plau^{B} 'bark (v.)'
- *ʔap^{D} 'bathe'
- *ʈai^{B} 'bite'
- *rəm^{C} 'bite'
- *tsol^{A} 'buy'
- *pa^{C} 'carry on back (1)'
- *m-blik^{D} 'carry on back (2)'
- *s-le^{B} 'choose'
- *kləp^{D} 'close eye (1)'
- *nəp^{D} 'close eye (2)'
- *(C-)ma^{A} 'come'
- *m-duŋ^{A} 'come (return)'
- *ɖəŋ^{A} 'crow (v.)'
- *te^{C} 'cut (1)'
- *hrən^{C} 'cut (2)'
- *caɯ^{C} 'descend (1)'
- *d-loŋ^{A} 'descend (2)'
- *pɣon^{A} 'die'
- *du^{A} 'do'
- *l-pən^{A} 'dream'
- *hrom^{C} 'drink'
- *m-ʈak^{D} 'dry in sun'
- *kan^{A} 'eat'
- *tok^{D} 'fall'
- *t-lui^{A} 'flow'
- *dəp^{D} 'forget'
- *nak^{D} 'give'
- *pwən^{B} 'get (1)'
- *m-to^{B} 'get (2)'
- *ɣwa^{C} 'go'
- *kəm^{C} 'hatch'
- *ʔən^{A} 'have'
- *dʒək^{D} 'hear'
- *kom^{A} 'hold in mouth (1)'
- *ʔom^{A} 'hold in mouth (2)'
- *p-ɣon^{A} 'kill'
- *so^{A} 'know'
- *k-so^{A} 'laugh'
- *lim^{C} 'lick'
- *(h)ŋwai^{A/B} 'love'
- *təm^{C} 'plant (v.)'
- *bet^{D} 'pluck'
- *(ʔ)jəŋ^{A/C} 'rest'
- *ʔi^{B} 'scold (1)'
- *kən^{C} 'scold (2)'
- *hɲan^{B} 'scold (3)'
- *kai^{A} 'see'
- *ti^{C} 'see (look)'
- *s-ɣwi^{A} 'sell'
- *səl^{B} 'shake/shiver'
- *d-ri^{C} 'sick'
- *ŋu^{B} 'sleep (1)'
- *ʔu^{B} 'sleep (2)'
- *mu^{B} 'smell'
- *pɣa^{B} 'split (1)'
- *de^{B} 'split (2)'
- *lum^{C} 'steal'
- *tsu^{C} 'steam (v.)'
- *d-lwal C/A 'swallow (v.)'
- *klut^{D} 'take off'
- *tʂun^{A} 'teach'
- *hŋa(ɯ)^{A} 'wait'
- *C-pwi^{A} 'walk'
- *le^{C} 'wear'
- *ɲit^{D} 'weep'

Space, time, and deictics

- *lju^{A} 'above'
- *lon^{A} 'back/behind'
- *dəŋ^{C} 'back/behind'
- *kun^{A} 'before/front'
- *ɲun^{B/C} 'below'
- *(h)wən^{A} 'day'
- *t-luŋ^{C} 'inside'
- *mjaŋ^{B} 'left'
- *m-ɖjan^{A} 'month'
- *ri^{C} 'outside'
- *(x-)mit^{D} 'right'
- *ʔ-ɲa^{C/B} 'that'
- *ʔ-ni^{C/B} 'this'
- *m-(p)ɣiŋ^{A} 'year'

Numerals

- *tʂəm^{C} 'one'
- *sa^{A} 'two'
- *tu^{A} 'three'
- *pə^{A} 'four'
- *r-ma^{A} 'five'
- *x-nəm^{A} 'six'
- *t-ru^{A} 'seven'
- *m-ru^{A} 'eight'
- *s-ɣwa^{B} 'nine'
- *pwlot^{D} 'ten'
- *kjən^{A} 'hundred'

== See also ==
- Proto-Austronesian language
- Proto-Hlai language
- Proto-Kam–Sui language
- Proto-Tai language
- Austro-Tai languages
