= Jiamao language =

Language of Hainan, China

Jiamao
- Sai 塞
- Tai 台
- Jiamao language
- Native to: China
- Region: Hainan
- Native speakers: (50,000 cited 1987)
- Language family: Kra-Dai or language isolate: Hlai–Jiamao?; Jiamao

Language codes
- ISO 639-3: jio
- Glottolog: jiam1236

Jiamao (Chinese: 加茂; pinyin: Jiāmào; also 台 Tái or 塞 Sāi) is a divergent Kra-Dai language or possible language isolate spoken in southern Hainan, China. Jiamao speakers' autonym is tʰai^{1}.

== Classification ==
Jiamao is often classified one of the Hlai languages, which constitute a primary branch of the Kra–Dai language family, but Norquest (2007, 2015) and others note that Jiamao has a non-Hlai substratum.

Graham Thurgood (1992) suggested that Jiamao might have an Austroasiatic substratum. Norquest (2007) identified various lexical items in Jiamao that do not reconstruct to Proto-Hlai and later firmly established it as a non-Hlai language. Hsiu (2018) notes that Jiamao also contains various words borrowed from an unknown, currently extinct Tibeto-Burman branch.

Ostapirat (2026) suggests that Jiamao originated in northern Vietnam before migrating to southern Hainan.

== Demographics ==
In the 1980s, Jiamao was spoken by 50,000 people in central and south-central Hainan, mostly in Jiamao Township (加茂镇) in Baoting Li and Miao Autonomous County. It shares less than half of its lexicon with the Hlai languages.

In Lingshui Li Autonomous County, Jiamao is spoken in Benhao (本号), Nanping (南平), Wenluo (文罗), Zuguan (祖关), Longguang (隆广), and Tianzi (田仔). In Lingshui County, Jiamao is known as Tái (台), and is also known as Sāi (塞) or Jiāwǒ (加我).

There are four Jiamao dialects, namely Jiamao (加茂), Liugong (六弓), Tianzi (田仔), and Qunying (群英).

Jiamao is spoken in the following villages and townships of southern Hainan.

- Baoting Li and Miao Autonomous County (保亭黎族苗族自治县)
  - Jiamao Township (加茂乡)
  - Liugong Township (六弓乡)
  - Shiling Town (什玲镇, in Jie 介村 and Shisheng 什胜村 villages)
- Lingshui Li Autonomous County (陵水黎族自治县)
  - Longguang Town (隆广镇)
  - Benhao Town (本号镇)
- Sanya (三亚市)
  - Haitangwan Town (海棠湾镇, northeastern part: in Longtoucai 龙头菜村, Xiepei 协配村, and Maohou 毛喉村 villages)

The Liaoergong (廖二弓) dialect is documented in Huang (2011).

== Phonology ==
=== Tones ===
Jiamao has 8 distinct tone categories (Norquest 2015:311):

Tone category	High register tone	Low register tone
A (open)	/55/ (tone 1)	/11/ (tone 4)
X (glottalized)	/51/ (tone 5)	/31/ (tone 2)
DL (long closed)	/53/ (tone 9)	/31/ (tone 8)
DS (short closed)	/55/ (tone 7)	/22/ (tone 10)

Like Proto-Be, Jiamao does not distinguish between tone categories B and C, but rather only has an X category.

As noted by Thurgood (1992) and Norquest (2015), these do not correspond to Hlai tones, but rather initials in Proto-Hlai. High register tones are derived from unvoiced initials, and low register tones from voiced initials.

== See also ==
- Jiamao vocabulary lists (Wiktionary)

== Works cited ==
- Thurgood, Graham (1992). "The Aberrancy of the Jiamao Dialect of Hlai: Speculation on its Origins and History". In Ratliff, Martha S.; Schiller, E. (eds.). Papers from the First Annual Meeting of the Southeast Asian Linguistics Society. Arizona State University, Program for Southeast Asian Studies. pp. 417–433.
- Norquest, Peter Kristian (2007). A Phonological Reconstruction of Proto-Hlai (PhD dissertation thesis). University of Arizona. hdl:10150/194203.
- Norquest, Peter K. (2015). A Phonological Reconstruction of Proto-Hlai. Brill. ISBN 978-90-04-30052-1.
