= SEAlang Library =

Online library

The SEAlang Library is an online library that hosts Southeast Asian linguistic reference materials.

Established in 2005 and publicly launched on April 1, 2006, it was initially funded from the Technological Innovation and Cooperation for Foreign Information Access (TICFIA) program of the U.S. Department of Education, with matching funds from computational linguistics research centers. In 2009, it focused on the non-Roman script languages used throughout mainland Southeast Asia. Beginning in 2010 and continuing through 2013, the concentration moved to the many languages of maritime Southeast Asia. Resources include bilingual and monolingual dictionaries; monolingual works and aligned bitext works; tools for manipulating, searching, and displaying complex scripts; and specialized reference works that include historical and etymological dictionaries.
