= Proto-Hlai language =

Reconstructed ancestor of the Hlai languages

Proto-Hlai
- Reconstruction of: Hlai languages
- Region: Hainan
- Reconstructed ancestor: Proto-Kra–Dai

Proto-Hlai is the reconstructed ancestor of the Hlai languages. Proto-Hlai reconstructions include those of Matisoff (1988), Thurgood (1991), Wu (2000), Ostapirat (2004), and Norquest (2007).

== Phonology ==
=== Consonants ===
Peter K. Norquest (2007) reconstructs 29 basic Proto-Hlai consonants (Norquest 2007:135), while Weera Ostapirat reconstructs only 19 proto-consonants (Ostapirat 2007:145).

Norquest 2007
		Labial	Alveolar	Post- alveolar	(Alveolo-) palatal	Velar	Glottal
Nasal	voiceless	*hm	*hn		*hɲ	*hŋ(w)	
Nasal	voiced	*C-m	*C-n		*C-ɲ	*C(u)ŋ	
Plosive/ Affricate	tenuis				*tɕ	*k	*(Ci/u)ʔ
Plosive/ Affricate	aspirated	*pʰ	*tʰ	*tʃʰ(w)	*tɕʰ	*kʰ	
Implosive		*ɓ	*ɗ				
Fricative	voiceless	*f(j)	*s				
Fricative	voiced	*C-β					*(Ci/u)ɦ
Approximant	voiceless	*hw			*hj		
Approximant	voiced	*ʋ					
Lateral	voiceless		*hl				
Lateral	voiced	*p-l	*C-l	*lj			
Vibrant	tap		*(Cu)ɾ	*ɾj			
Vibrant	trill		*(Cu)r				

Norquest additionally reconstructs six onsets suggesting consonant clusters: *pl, *fj, *lj, *ɾj, *tʃʰw, *ŋ̊w. Whether these were actual consonant clusters is not clear. The clusters with a glide as a second member may have been coarticulated consonants: palatalized *fʲ, *lʲ, *ɾʲ, labialized *tʃʰʷ, *ŋ̊ʷ, while *pl may have arisen from a sesquisyllable *p-l.

Norquest also reconstructs six bisyllabic root shapes:

- *Ci + glottal: *Ciʔ-, *Ciɦ-
- *Cu + glottal: *Cuʔ-, *Cuɦ-
- *Cu + rhotic: *Cuɾ-, *Cur-

Pretonic syllables are later lost in all Hlai languages, but in these six combinations, they trigger in some languages conditional developments of the tonic syllable's onset consonant, allowing them to be distinguished in reconstruction.

In Ostapirat's (2004) reconstruction, Proto-Hlai forms can be both monosyllabic and disyllabic. Some disyllabic forms have medial consonants beginning with three penultimate vowels (*u-, *i-, *a-; the last of which is default). Vowels can also combine with *-i or *-u to form diphthongs. Tones (*A, *B, *C, *D) are also reconstructed.

Ostapirat 2004
		Labial	Alveolar	Palatal	Dorsal	Glottal
Nasal		*m	*n	*ɲ	*ŋ	
Plosive	voiceless	*p	*t	*c	*k	*ʔ
Plosive	voiced	*b	*d	*ɟ	*g	
Fricative			*s			
Approximant		*ʋ	*l	*j	*w	
Trill			*r		*ʀ	

- /*m *n *ɲ *ŋ *p *t *c *k *l/ may occur in syllable coda.

=== Vowels ===
Ostapirat (2004) reconstructs 5 vowels, which are /a, ə, i, ɨ, u/. Norquest reconstructs seven vowel qualities (Norquest 2007:238, 330).

Norquest 2007
	Front		Central		Back	
	short	long	short	long	short	long
Close	*i	*iː	*ɯ	*ɯː	*u	*uː
Mid		*eː	*ə	*əː	*o	
Open				*aː		

The short vowels *i, *ɯ, *u, *ə, *o and long *əː only appear in roots with a final consonant (Norquest 2007:330).

== Sound changes ==
The transition from Pre-Hlai (the predecessor of the Proto-Hlai language ancestral to both Hlai and Jiamao) to Proto-Hlai involved the following series of sound changes (Norquest 2007:308). (Order follows that of the table of contents – not intended to be sequential)

1. Elimination of Uvulars – loss of Pre-Hlai uvulars *q, *C-q, *C-ɢ
2. Intervocalic Lenition – -p- > -ʋ-, -t- > -ɾ-, -k- > -ɦ-, etc.
3. Initial Devoicing – loss of voiced fricatives, etc.
4. Vocalic Transfer – vowel in penultimate syllable moved to last syllable
5. Initial Aspiration
6. Monosyllabification – Pre-Hlai, which was sesquisyllabic, was reduced to monosyllabic forms in Proto-Hlai.
7. Stop and Fricative Affrication – ʈʰ > tʃʰ, cʰ > tɕʰ, etc.
8. Peripheral Vowel Raising – e(ːC) > i(ːC), o(ːC) > u(ːC), ɛː(C) > eː(C), ɔC > oC
9. Monophthongization – *ɯa(C) > *ɯə(C) > *ɯː(C), *oːy > *wiː > *iː

Or, in the sequential order given in Norquest (2007:416–417), which excludes monophthongization:

1. Intervocalic lenition
2. Elimination of uvulars
3. Peripheral vowel raising
4. Initial devoicing
5. Vocalic Transfer
6. Initial aspiration
7. Monosyllabification
8. Stop and fricative affrication

After evolving from Pre-Hlai, Proto-Hlai initials went through 4 main types of sound changes (Norquest 2007:66).

1. Temporal compression – reduction of constituents in the syllable; most common
2. Gesture reduction
3. Onset fortition – change to initial aspiration, etc.
4. Systemic realignment – mergers, etc.

After the breakup of Proto-Hlai, the following sound changes occurred in various Hlai branches.

1. Devoicing
2. Registrogenesis – creation of tone registers (i.e., register splits); most likely influenced by Hainanese Min Chinese

The following table gives the reflexes of the onset consonants in the Hlai languages, as well as Norquest and Ostapirat's reconstructions:

Norquest	Ostapirat	Bouhin	Ha Em	Lauhut	Qi group			Cunhua	Nadouhua	Meifu group		Run group		Notes
Norquest	Ostapirat	Bouhin	Ha Em	Lauhut	Tongzha	Zandui	Baoting	Cunhua	Nadouhua	Changjiang	Moyfaw	Baisha	Yuanmen	
*ɓ	*b	ɓ	ɓ	ɓ	ɓ			ɓ	ɓ	ɓ		ɓ		
*ɗ	*d	ɗ	ɗ	ɗ	ɗ			ɗ, ts	ɗ	ɗ		ɗ		
*tɕ	*ɟ	ts	ts	ts	ts			ts	ts	ts		ts	t	
*k	*g	k	k	k	k			k	k	k		k		
*pʰ	*p	pʰ	pʰ	pʰ	pʰ			pʰ	pʰ	pʰ		pʰ		
*tʰ	*t	tʰ	tʰ	tʰ	tʰ			tʰ, tsʰ	tʰ	tʰ		tʰ		
*kʰ	*k	kʰ	kʰ	kʰ	kʰ			kʰ	kʰ	kʰ		kʰ		
*tɕʰ	*c	tsʰ	tsʰ	tsʰ	tsʰ			tsʰ	s	tsʰ		tsʰ		
*tʃʰ	*C-t	tsʰ	tsʰ	tsʰ	tsʰ			h	h	tsʰ		tsʰ		
*tʃʰw	*Cut	tsʰ	tsʰ	f	tsʰ			f	f	f		f	pfʰ	
*f	*C-p	pʰ	f	f	f			f	f	f		f	pfʰ	
*fj	*Cip	pʰ	f	f	f			s	f	s		f	pfʰ	A very rare correspondence set, with only one word ('tooth', *fjən) being reflected in both key languages, Cunhua and Changjiang.
*C-β	*Cup	p	f	f	f			f	f	kʷ	ɣ	f		
*s	*s	t	t	t	t			tθ	f	s		tsʰ		*s > t is a late areal change, shared also by the only distantly related Be language.
*ɦ	*C-k	h	h	h	h			h	h	h		h		
*m̥	*C-m	m	p	p	p ↓	pʰ ↓	p ↓	ɓ ↓	p ↓	p ↓	p	p	p ↓	In these correspondence sets, nasality is retained only in Bouhin. Norquest reconstructs prenasalized stops *mb, *nd, *ɲɟ, *ŋg as the proto-non-Bouhin intermediate stage.
*n̥	*C-n	n	t	t	t ↓	tʰ ↓	t ↓	ts ↓	t ↓	t ↓	t	t	t ↓	In these correspondence sets, nasality is retained only in Bouhin. Norquest reconstructs prenasalized stops *mb, *nd, *ɲɟ, *ŋg as the proto-non-Bouhin intermediate stage.
*ɲ̊	*C-ɲ	ɲ	ts	ts	ts ↓	tsʰ ↓	ts ↓	ts ↓	ts ↓	ts ↓	ts	ts	ts ↓	In these correspondence sets, nasality is retained only in Bouhin. Norquest reconstructs prenasalized stops *mb, *nd, *ɲɟ, *ŋg as the proto-non-Bouhin intermediate stage.
*ŋ̊	*C-ŋ	ŋ	k	k	k ↓	kʰ ↓	k ↓	k ↓	k ↓	k ↓	k	k	k ↓	In these correspondence sets, nasality is retained only in Bouhin. Norquest reconstructs prenasalized stops *mb, *nd, *ɲɟ, *ŋg as the proto-non-Bouhin intermediate stage.
*C-m	*m	m	m	m	m	m ↓	m	m	m	m		m	m ↓	
*C-n	*n	n	n	n	n	n ↓	n	n	n	n		n	n ↓	
*C-ɲ	*ɲ	ɲ	ɲ	ɲ	ɲ	n ↓	ɲ	ɲ	ŋʲ	ɲ		ɲ	ɲ ↓	
*Ciɦ	*Cik	h	h	hʲ	z	z	hʲ	ɲ	ŋʲ	ɲ		ɲ	ɲ ↓	With rhinoglottophilia in Cunhua through Run: *Ciɦ > *(Ci)ɦj > *ʔɲ.
*C-ŋ	*ŋ	ŋ	ŋ	ŋ	ŋ	ŋ ↓	ŋ	ŋ	ŋ	ŋ		ŋ	ŋ ↓	
*Cuŋ	*ŋw	ŋ	ŋ	ŋʷ	ŋʷ	ŋ ↓	ŋ, ŋʷ	ŋ	ŋʷ	ŋ		ŋ	ɱ ↓	
*Cuɦ	*Cuk	h	h	hʷ	gʷ	v	hʷ	ŋ	ŋ, ŋʷ	ŋ		ŋ	ɱ ↓	Rhinoglottophilia in Cunhua through Run: *Cuɦ > *(Cu)ɦw > *ʔŋʷ.
*l̥	*C-l	ɗ	ɬ	ɬ	ɬ			tθ	l	ɬ		ɬ		
*C-l	*l	l	l	l	l	l ↓	l	l	l	l		l	l ↓	
*p-l	*p-l	l	l	pl	pl	p	pl	ɓ ↓, l ↓	pʲ ↓	p ↓	pl	pl		
*ɾ	*C-r	r	r	r	r ↓	l ↓	l ↓	l ↓	l ↓	l ↓	r	r	r ↓	
*r	*C-ʀ	r	g	g	g ↓	h ↓	h ↓	h ↓	ŋ ↓	g ↓	x	x	kʰ	
*ʔ	*ʔ	ʔ	ʔ	ʔ	ʔ			ʔ	ʔ	ʔ		ʔ		
*Ciʔ	*Ciʔ	ʔ	ʔ	ʔʲ	z	z	ʔʲ	z	ʔʲ	z		z		These onsets (as well as *Ciɦ-, *Cuɦ- above) showing characteristic cheshirization outside of Bouhin and Ha Em.
*Cuʔ	*Cuʔ	ʔ	ʔ	ʔʷ	gʷ	v	ʔʷ	v	ʔʷ	kʷ	ɣ	v		These onsets (as well as *Ciɦ-, *Cuɦ- above) showing characteristic cheshirization outside of Bouhin and Ha Em.
*Cur	*Cuʀ	r	g	gʷ	gʷ ↓	v ↓	hʷ ↓	v ↓	ŋ ↓, v ↓	kʷ	ɣ	v		These onsets (as well as *Ciɦ-, *Cuɦ- above) showing characteristic cheshirization outside of Bouhin and Ha Em.
*Cuɾ	*Cur	r	r	v	f ↓			v ↓	v ↓	kʷ	ɣ	f	f ↓	These onsets (as well as *Ciɦ-, *Cuɦ- above) showing characteristic cheshirization outside of Bouhin and Ha Em.
*ʋ	*C-ʋ	v	v	v	f ↓	v ↓	v	v ↓	v ↓	v ↓	v	v	v ↓	
*ʍ	*Vw	v	v	hʷ	v ↓	v ↓	v	v	v ↓	v ↓	v	v	v ↓	
*ŋ̊w	*Vw	v	v	hʷ	v ↓	v ↓	v	h ↓	ŋ ↓, v ↓	v ↓	v	v	v ↓	
*ȷ̊	*Vj	z	z	z	z ↓	z ↓	z	z	z ↓	z ↓	z	z	z ↓	
*lj	*il	z	z	z	ɬ ↓			l ↓	z ↓	z ↓	z	z	ts ↓	With *lj > *lʑ > *ɮ > ɬ in Qi (lowered tone still indicating earlier voicing).
*ɾj	*Cir	z	z	r	t ↓	tʰ ↓	t ↓	z ↓	l ↓	t ↓	t	t, ts	t, ts ↓	

The symbol ↓ indicates here a lowered tone on the following vowel in those Hlai languages where tone split has taken place; this normally occurs following earlier voiced consonants.

== See also ==
- Proto-Hlai reconstructions (Wiktionary)
- Proto-Tai language
- Proto-Kra language
- Proto-Austronesian language
- Austro-Tai languages

== Bibliography ==
- Norquest, Peter K. 2007. A Phonological Reconstruction of Proto-Hlai. Ph.D. dissertation. Tucson: Department of Anthropology, University of Arizona.
- Norquest, Peter K. 2015. A Phonological Reconstruction of Proto-Hlai. Languages of Asia, Volume 13. Leiden: Brill. ISBN 978-90-04-30052-1
- Ostapirat, Weera. 2004. "Proto-Hlai Sound System and Lexicons." In Studies on Sino-Tibetan Languages: Papers in Honor of Professor Hwang-cherng Gong on His Seventieth Birthday. Edited by Ying-chin Lin, Fang-min Hsu, Chun-chih Lee, Jackson T.-S. Sun, Hsiu-fang Yang, and Dah-an Ho. Institute of Linguistics. Academia Sinica, Taipei, Taiwan: 121–175.
- Matisoff, James. 1988. "Proto-Hlai initials and tones: a first approximation." In Comparative Kadai: Linguistic studies beyond Tai. Edited by Jerold A. Edmondson and David B. Solnit. Summer Institute of Linguistics and The University of Texas at Arlington Publications in Linguistics No. 86: 289–321.
- Thurgood, Graham. 1991. "Proto-Hlai (Li): a look at the initials, tones, and finals." In Kadai: Discussions in Kadai and SE Asian Linguistics III: 1–49.
- Wu Anqi 吴安其. 2000. "Liyu guyin gouni 黎语古音构拟." In Minzu Yuwen 民族语文 2000(5): 1–13.
