= Graham Thurgood =

American linguist

- Occupation: Linguist

Academic background
- Education: University of California, Berkeley
- Influences: James Matisoff

Academic work
- Institutions: California State University, Chico
- Main interests: Chamic languages, languages of East Asia

Graham Thurgood (Chinese: 杜冠明; pinyin: Dù Guānmíng) is an American retired professor of linguistics at California State University, Chico.

Thurgood graduated with a Ph.D. in linguistics from University of California, Berkeley, where he studied under James Matisoff.

Thurgood's areas of specialization include tonogenesis, historical linguistics, language contact, and second language acquisition. Thurgood has reconstructed Chamic (Austronesian), the Hlai languages (Kra-Dai and Kam-Sui), and parts of Tibeto-Burman (Sino-Tibetan).

Thurgood's tone work includes the reconstruction of tone in Chamic, internal reconstruction of tone in Jiamao, and a substantial article on tonogenesis in general.

== Selected Publications ==
- Graham Thurgood (1999). From ancient Cham to modern dialects: two thousand years of language contact and change : with an appendix of Chamic reconstructions and loanwords. University of Hawaii Press. ISBN 0-8248-2131-9.
- Graham Thurgood. (1999). From Ancient Cham to Modern Dialects: Two Thousand Years of Language Contact and Change: With an Appendix of Chamic Reconstructions and Loanwords. Oceanic Linguistics Special Publications, No. 28, pp. i, iii-vii, ix-xiii, xv-xvii, 1–259, 261–275, 277–397, 399–407.
- Graham Thurgood. (1992). The aberrancy of the Jiamao dialect of Hlai: speculation on its origins and history. Southeast Asian Linguistics Society I, Edited by Martha Ratliff and Eric Schiller. Tempe: Arizona State University Southeast Asian Studies Publication Program. pp. 417–433.
