= Austro-Tai languages =

Proposed language family

Austro-Tai
- (under consideration)
- Geographic distribution: Southeast Asia, East Asia
- Linguistic classification: proposed language family
- Subdivisions: Austronesian; Kra–Dai

Language codes
- Glottolog: None
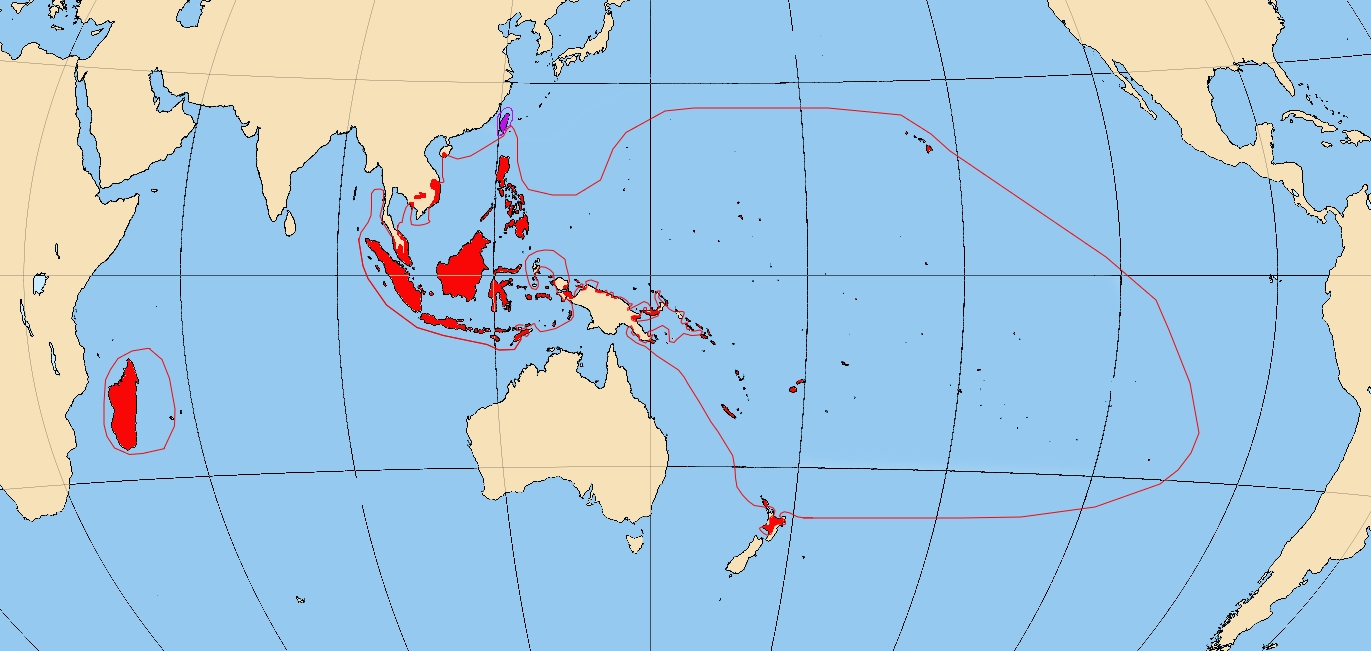
- The historical distribution of Austronesian languages

Distribution of the Tai–Kadai language family.
Kra
Kam–Sui
Be
Hlai
Northern Tai
Central Tai
Southwestern Tai

Austro-Tai (/ˌɔːstroʊˈtaɪ/ AW-stroh-TY), sometimes also spelled Austro-Thai, is a proposed language family that would link the Austronesian languages and Kra–Dai languages together as a single language family.

Similarities between the Austronesian languages and Thai were first noticed by sinologist Gustaaf Schlegel in 1901, during a study of Thai grammar. In 1942, Paul K. Benedict published a proposal for an expansion of the related Austric theory to include Kra–Dai; this was the first proposal linking the two families.

Generally, the similarities between Proto-Austronesian and Proto-Kra–Dai are considered too numerous to be explained by chance resemblance. The debate is about whether these similarities are caused by a genealogical relationship between Austronesian and Kra–Dai, or due to extensive language contact, forming a sprachbund.

== Evidence ==
=== Linguistic ===
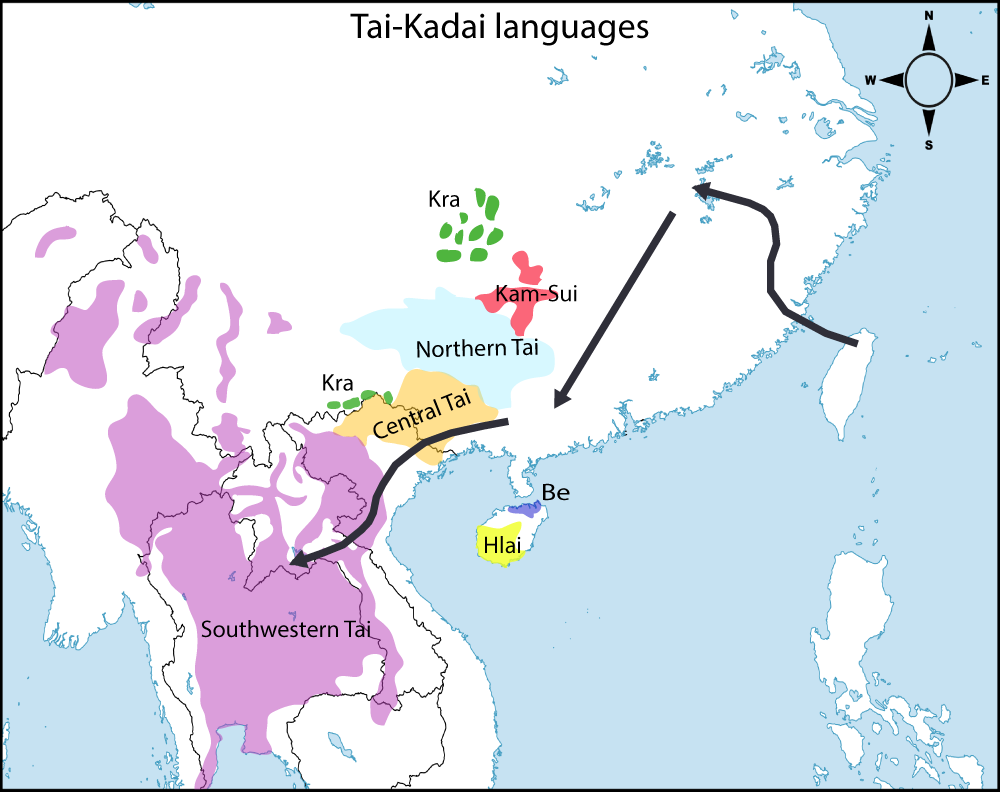
Tai-Kadai migration route according to Matthias Gerner's Northeast to Southwest Hypothesis.

"Tooth" in Kra-Dai languages. Compare with Proto-Austronesian *nipən

The first proposal of a genealogical relationship was that of Paul Benedict in 1942, which he expanded upon through 1990. This took the form of an expansion of Wilhelm Schmidt's Austric phylum, and posited that Kra–Dai and Austronesian had a sister relationship within Austric, which Benedict then accepted. Benedict later abandoned Austric but maintained his Austro-Tai proposal, adding the Japonic languages to the proposal as well. The proposal remained controversial among linguists, especially after the publication of Benedict (1975) whose methods of reconstruction were idiosyncratic and considered unreliable. For example, Thurgood (1994) examined Benedict's claims and concluded that since the sound correspondences and tonal developments were irregular, there was no evidence of a genealogical relationship, and the numerous cognates must be chalked up to early language contact.

However, the fact that many of the Austro-Tai cognates are found in core vocabulary, which is generally more resistant to borrowing, continued to intrigue scholars. There were later several advances over Benedict's approach: Abandoning the larger Austric proposal; focusing on lexical reconstruction and regular sound correspondences; including data from additional branches of Kra–Dai, Hlai and Kra; using better reconstructions of Kra–Dai; and reconsidering the nature of the relationship, with Kra–Dai possibly being a branch (daughter) of Austronesian.

Sagart (2005a) cited a core of regular sound correspondences relating words belonging to the basic vocabulary in Benedict's work. He pointed out the lack of a substantial body of shared cultural words. He took these facts as indications that Benedict's Austro-Tai cannot be explained as a contact phenomenon. He further listed a number of specifically Malayo-Polynesian features in the vocabulary shared by Tai-Kadai and Austronesian, concluding that Tai-Kadai is a subgroup within Austronesian, rather than a sister group to it.

Ostapirat (2000) reconstructed proto-Kra, one of the least-well attested branches of Kra–Dai. Ostapirat (2005) later presented fifty core vocabulary items found in all five branches of Kra–Dai, and demonstrated that half of them—words such as child, eat, eye, fire, hand, head, I, you, louse, moon, tooth, water, this, etc.—can be related to proto-Austronesian by regular sound correspondences, a connection which Reid (2006) finds convincing.

Austronesian is characterized by disyllabic roots, whereas Kra–Dai is predominantly monosyllabic. It appears that in Kra–Dai, the first vowel reduced and then dropped out, leaving a consonant cluster which frequently reduced further to a single consonant. For example, the proto-Austronesian root *qudip "live, raw" corresponds to proto-Kra (k-)Dep and its reflex ktʰop in Laha, as well as Tai dip, all with the same meaning (the *-D- consonant is Ostapirat's voiced plosive of undetermined quality, probably alveolar as opposed to dental articulation).

In proto-Kra–Dai, there appear to have been three tones in words ending in a sonorant (vowel or nasal consonant), labeled simply A, B, C, plus words ending in a stop consonant, D, which did not have tone. In general, Austronesian words ending in a sonorant correspond to A, and words ending in a stop correspond to D. This accounts for most of the words. There are also a few cognates with B and C tone. From Indic borrowings it appears that tone B was originally a final h in Kra–Dai, and some of the corresponding Austronesian roots also end in h, such as AN *qəmpah "chaff", Kam–Sui paa-B (Mulam kwaa-B), though there are few examples to go on. Tone C seems to have originally been creaky voice or a final glottal stop. It may correspond to *H, a laryngeal consonant of uncertain manner, in proto-Austronesian (AN *quluH "head", Thai klau-C), but again the number of cognates is too low to draw firm conclusions.

Sagart (2004) presented data from a newly described Kra language, Buyang, which—like many other Kra languages—retains the disyllabic roots characteristic of Austronesian. Some examples are:

| Root | Buyang | Proto-MP |
|---|---|---|
| "to die" | matɛ́ | *matay |
| "eye" | matá | *mata |
| "head" | qaðù | *quluH |
| "eight" | maðû | *walu |
| "bird" | manùk | *manuk |
| "flower" | maŋà | *buŋah |

Ostapirat (2013) lists the following potential cognates between Proto-Kra-Dai and Proto-Austronesian. The Proto-Kra-Dai "C" signifies any unknown consonant; the Proto-Austronesian "C" is a phoneme tentatively reconstructed either as /t͡s/, /t/, or /ʈ/

| Meaning | Proto-Kra-Dai | Proto-Austronesian |
|---|---|---|
| "eye" | *maTaː | *maCa |
| "hand" | *(C)imɤː | *(qa)lima |
| "tongue" | *(C)əmaː | *Səma |
| "tooth" | *lipan | *nipən |
| "louse" | *KuTuː | *kuCu |
| "fire" | *(C)apuj | *Sapuy |
| "water" | *(C)aNam | *daNum |
| "I" | *akuː | *aku |
| "you", sg. | *isuː | *iSu |
| "one" | *(C)itsɤː | *əsa, *isa |
| "to die" | *maTaːj | *ma-aCay |

Sagart (2019) finds multiple examples of the correlation between the coda of Proto-Austronesian polysyllabic words and the tone of suspected Kra-Dai cognates.

- Sonorant-final Austronesian terms corresponded with tone A in Kra-Dai.
- Proto-Austronesian uvular fricative finals corresponded with tone B.
- Proto-Austronesian final sibilants and /h/ corresponded with tone C.

Proto-Kra–Dai *d- corresponds to both Proto-Austronesian *d- and *j- according to Ostapirat (2023).

Smith (2021) deduces that Proto-Austronesian final-syllable *a regularly corresponds to Proto-Tai *ɯ(ə) if penultimate Proto-Austronesian syllable contained a high vowel, like *i or *u. On the other hand, if that penultimate syllable had a low vowel instead, Proto-Austronesian *a would instead correspond to Proto-Tai *aː.

=== Genetic ===
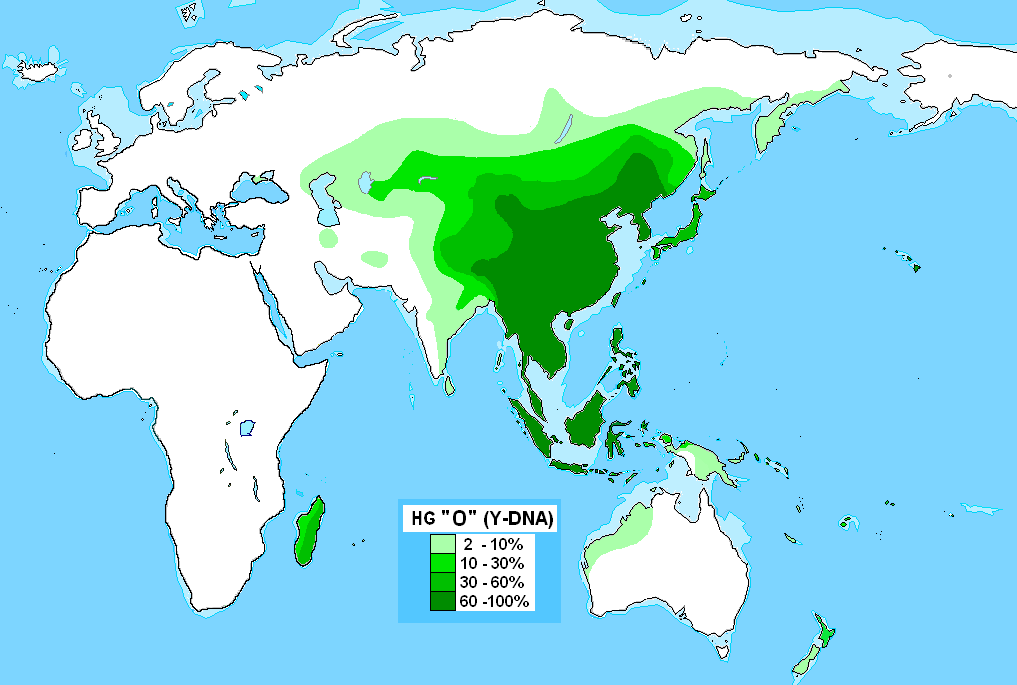
Haplogroup O (Y-DNA) distribution

Recent genetic studies have shown that many Austronesian and Daic speakers both share the same paternally inherited Y-chromosome genetic marker, namely O1a-M119 (O1a is the haplogroup name, while M119 is its defining mutation.). For instance, 69%-90% of all male Taiwanese aborigines carry the O1a-M119 marker, while 8%-58% of all male Hlai (a Daic ethnic group from Hainan, China) carry the genetic marker.

== Relationship ==
Among scholars who accept the evidence as definitive, there is disagreement as to the nature of the relationship. Benedict attempted to show that Tai–Kadai has features which cannot be accounted for by proto-Austronesian, and that therefore it must be a separate family coordinate with Austronesian (a sister relationship). Ostapirat concluded that these reconstructed linguistic features are spurious. However, he could not rule out the possibility that Tai–Kadai tone cannot be explained, and so leaves the question open pending further reconstruction of Proto-Austronesian. He supports the consensus hypothesis of several scholars that proto-Austronesian was spoken on Formosa or adjacent areas of coastal China, and that the likely homeland of Proto-Tai–Kadai was coastal Fujian or Guangdong. The spread of the Tai–Kadai peoples may have been aided by agriculture, but any who remained near the coast were eventually absorbed by the Chinese.

Sagart, on the other hand, holds that Tai–Kadai is a branch of Austronesian which migrated back to the mainland from northeastern Formosa long after Formosa was settled, but probably before the expansion of Malayo-Polynesian out of Formosa. He presents a distinct argument for subgrouping Tai-Kadai with Malayo-Polynesian: he argues that the numerals 5–10, shared by Tai-Kadai, Malayo-Polynesian and three southeastern Formosan languages, are post-proto-Austronesian innovations. Part of the problem of evidence may be due to the loss of the ancestral languages in the Philippines: the uniformity of Philippine languages suggests widespread language replacement after the expected time of the Tai–Kadai split.

Sagart (2005b) again proposes an Eastern Formosan–Malayo-Polynesian connection with Tai–Kadai, based on words such as Proto-Tai–Kadai *maNuk and Eastern Formosan *manuk "bird", as compared to Proto-Austronesian, where the word for "bird" was *qayam, and *maNuk meant "chicken" (cf. English "fowl", which once meant "bird" but has come to usually refer to chickens and other birds raised for meat), and a few other words such *-mu "thou" which have not been reconstructed for proto-Austronesian. However, Ostapirat notes Tai–Kadai retains the Austronesian *N in this word, which had been lost from Eastern Formosan and Malayo-Polynesian, and that a change in meaning from "chicken" to "bird" could easily have happened independently, for example among proto-Tai–Kadai speakers when they borrowed the mainland word *ki "chicken" (cognate with Old Chinese *kej and Hmongic /qai/).

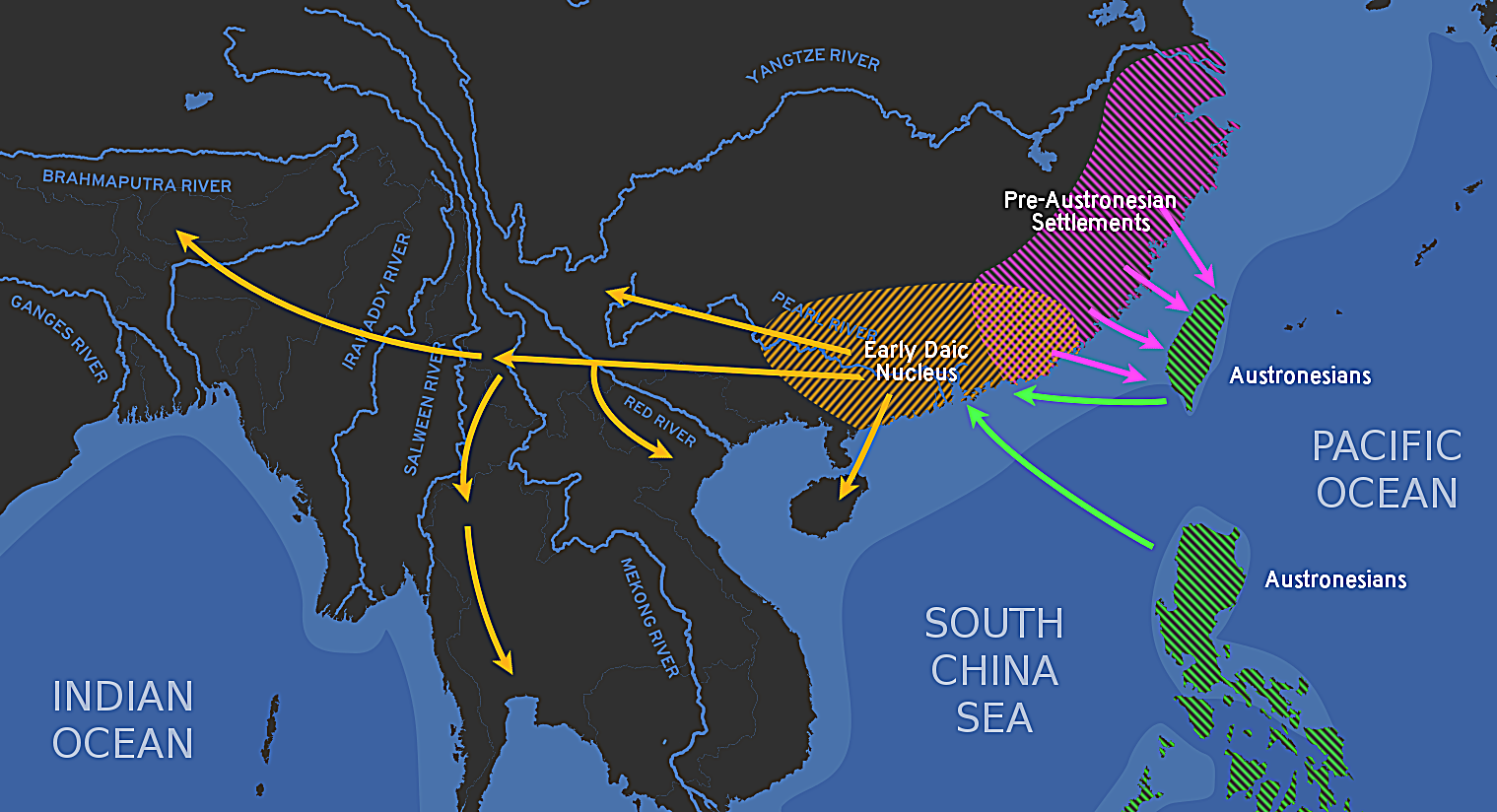
Proposed genesis of Daic languages and their relation with Austronesians (Blench, 2018)

Sagart (2005b) suggests that Austronesian (including Tai-Kadai) is ultimately related to the Sino-Tibetan languages, forming a Sino-Austronesian family. The Proto-Sino-Austronesian speakers would have originated from the Neolithic communities of the coastal regions of prehistoric North China or East China. Ostapirat disputes this view, noting that the apparent cognates are rarely found in all branches of Tai–Kadai, and almost none in core vocabulary.

Ostapirat maintains that Tai–Kadai could not descend from Malayo-Polynesian in the Philippines, and likely not from the languages of eastern Formosa either. His evidence is in the Tai–Kadai sound correspondences, which reflect Austronesian distinctions that were lost in Malayo-Polynesian and even Eastern Formosan. These are the pairs of proto-AN sounds *t/*C and *n/*N, which fell together as *t and *n in Proto-MP and Eastern Formosan, but which each correspond to pairs of distinct sounds in Proto-Tai–Kadai. Further, Proto-AN *S corresponds to *s in Proto-Tai–Kadai but was debuccalized to *h in Proto-MP. There are also Austro-Tai roots related to Proto-Austronesian roots which are not attested from Malayo-Polynesian, such as *Cumay "bear". In Sagart's model, such roots have to be treated as retentions from Proto-Austronesian only shared by Tai-Kadai and Formosan, and lost in Malayo-Polynesian.

Ostapirat (2013) concludes that Kra-Dai and Austronesian are sister languages with one common ancestor.

Roger Blench (2018) supports the genealogical relation between Kra-Dai and Austronesian based on the fundamentally shared vocabulary. He further suggests that Kra-Dai was later influenced from a back-migration from Taiwan and the Philippines.

== See also ==
- East Asian languages
- Austric languages
- Old Yue language
- Sino-Austronesian languages
- Austronesian–Ongan languages
- Proto-Kra–Dai language

== Bibliography ==
- Benedict, Paul K. (1942). "Thai, Kadai, and Indonesian: A new alignment in South-Eastern Asia" American Anthropologist 44.576-601.
- Benedict, Paul K. (1975). Austro-Thai language and culture, with a glossary of roots. New Haven: HRAF Press. ISBN 0-87536-323-7.
- Benedict, Paul K. (1990). Japanese/Austro-Tai. Ann Arbor: Karoma. ISBN 0-89720-078-0.
- Blench, Roger (2004). "Stratification in the peopling of China: how far does the linguistic evidence match genetics and archaeology?" (PDF) Paper for the Symposium : Human migrations in continental East Asia and Taiwan: genetic, linguistic and archaeological evidence. Geneva, June 10–13.
- Blench, Roger. (2010). Why we don't need Austric or any other macrophyla in SE Asia: The southern Yunnan interaction sphere (manuscript).
- Blust, Robert. (2014). "The Higher Phylogeny of Austronesian and the Position of Tai-Kadai: Another Look". In The 14th International Symposium on Chinese Languages and Linguistics (IsCLL-14).
- Carr, Michael. (1986). "Austro-Tai *Tsum(b)anget 'spirit' and Archaic Chinese *XmwângXmwet 恍惚 'bliss'". Asia-Africa Gengo Bunka Kenkyū, 32. 91–126. Tōkyō: Tōkyō Gaikokugo Daigaku.
- Chamberlain, James R. (2016). "Kra-Dai and the Proto-History of South China and Vietnam". Journal of the Siam Society, 104, 27–76.
- Li, Hui (李辉). (2005). Genetic structure of Austro-Tai populations (Doctoral dissertation). Fudan University.
- Li, Hui (李辉) et al. (2008). "Paternal genetic affinity between Western Austronesians and Daic populations". BMC Evolutionary Biology, 8, 146. doi:10.1186/1471-2148-8-146
- Liao, Hanbo; Gehrmann, Ryan (2025). "Kra-Dai tonogenesis in Austro-Tai perspective". Diachronica. 42 (3–4): 382–405. doi:10.1075/dia.24028.lia. ISSN 0176-4225.
- Luo, Y.-X. (2008). Sino-Tai and Tai-Kadai: Another Look. In A. V. N. Diller, J. A. Edmondson, & Y.-X. Luo (Eds.), The Tai-Kadai Languages (pp. 9–28). New York, NY: Routledge.
- Miyake, Marc. 2013. Thurgood's "Tai-Kadai and Austronesian: the nature of the historical relationship" (1994).
- Ostapirat, Weera. 2005. "Kra–Dai and Austronesian: Notes on phonological correspondences and vocabulary distribution." Laurent Sagart, Roger Blench & Alicia Sanchez-Mazas, eds. The Peopling of East Asia: Putting Together Archaeology, Linguistics and Genetics. London: Routledge Curzon, pp. 107–131.
- Reid, Lawrence A. (1994). "Morphological Evidence for Austric. Oceanic Linguistics, 33(2), 323–344.
- Reid, Lawrence A. (1999). "New Linguistic Evidence for the Austric Hypothesis". Selected Papers From the Eighth International Conference on Austronesian Linguistics (8ICAL) (pp. 5–30).
- Reid, Lawrence A. (2005). "The Current Status of Austric: A review and evaluation of the lexical and morphosyntactic evidence". In L. Sagart, R. Blench, & A. Sanchez-Mazas (Eds.), The Peopling of East Asia: Putting Together Archaeology, Linguistics and Genetics (pp. 132–160).
- Reid, Lawrence A. (2006). "Austro-Tai Hypotheses". In Keith Brown (Ed.), The Encyclopedia of Language and Linguistics, 2nd edition (pp. 609–610).
- Sagart, Laurent. (2004). "The higher phylogeny of Austronesian and the position of Tai-Kadai". Oceanic Linguistics, 43(2), 411–444.
- Sagart, Laurent. (2005a). "Sino-Tibetan-Austronesian: An Updated and Improved Argument". In L. Sagart, R. Blench, & A. Sanchez-Mazas (Eds.), The Peopling of East Asia: Putting Together Archaeology, Linguistics and Genetics (pp. 161–176).
- Sagart, Laurent. (2005b). "Tai-Kadai as a subgroup of Austronesian". In L. Sagart, R. Blench, & A. Sanchez-Mazas (Eds.), The Peopling of East Asia: Putting Together Archaeology, Linguistics and Genetics (pp. 177–181).
- Schmidt, Wilhelm. (1906) Die Mon-Khmer Völker, ein Bindeglied zwischen Völkern Zentralasiens und Austronesiens. Braunschweig: Friedrich Vieweg und Sohn.
- Thurgood, Graham. (1994). "Tai–Kadai and Austronesian: the nature of the relationship." Oceanic Linguistics 33.345-368.
