= Hlai languages =

Kra–Dai language family of China

Hlai
- Li
- Ha dialect Qi dialect Run dialect Meifu dialect Jiamao language
- Native to: China
- Region: Hainan
- Ethnicity: Hlai
- Native speakers: (667,000 cited 1999)
- Language family: Kra–Dai: Hlai–Jiamao?; Hlai
- Early form: Proto-Hlai (reconstructed)
- Writing system: Latin

Language codes
- ISO 639-3: Either: lic – Hlai cuq – Cun
- Glottolog: nucl1241

The Hlai languages (Chinese: 黎语; pinyin: Líyǔ) are a primary branch of the Kra–Dai language family spoken in the mountains of central and south-central Hainan in China by the Hlai people, not to be confused with the colloquial name for the Leizhou branch of Min Chinese (Chinese: 黎话; pinyin: Líhuà). They include Cun, whose speakers are ethnically distinct. A quarter of Hlai speakers are monolingual. None of the Hlai languages had a writing system until the 1950s, when the Latin script was adopted for Ha.

== Classification ==
Norquest (2007) classifies the Hlai languages as follows. There are some 750,000 Hlai speakers.

- Proto-Hlai
  - Bouhin (Hēitǔ 黑土) – 73,000
  - Greater Hlai
    - Ha Em 哈炎 (Zhōngshā 中沙) – 193,000
    - Central Hlai
      - East Central Hlai – 344,000
        - Lauhut (Bǎodìng 保定) – 166,000, the basis of the literary language
        - Qi 杞 (also known as Gei) – 178,000
          - Tongzha (Tōngshí 通什) – 125,000
          - Zandui (Qiànduì 堑对) – 29,000
          - Bǎotíng 保亭 – 24,000
      - North Central Hlai – 136,500
        - Northwest Central Hlai – 62,500
          - Cun 村语 (Ngan Fon, Gēlóng 仡隆) – 60,000
          - Nàdòu 那斗 (Dōngfāng 东方) – 2,500
        - Northeast Central Hlai – 74,000
          - Měifú 美孚 (Moifau) – 30,000
            - Chāngjiāng 昌江
            - Moyfaw (Xīfāng 西方)
          - Rùn 润 (Zwn; also known as Běndì 本地) – 44,000
            - Báishā 白沙 – 36,000
            - Yuánmén 元门 – 8,000

Nadou is spoken by approximately 4,000 people in the two villages of Nàdòu 那斗村 (in Xīnlóng Town 新龙镇) and Yuè 月村 (in Bāsuǒ Town 八所镇), in Dongfang, Hainan. Speakers refer to themselves as lai¹¹ and are officially classified by the Chinese government as ethnic Han Chinese.

Jiāmào 加茂 (52,000 speakers) is a divergent Kra-Dai language with a Hlai superstratum and a non-Hlai substratum.

== Reconstruction ==
The Proto-Hlai language is the reconstructed ancestor of the Hlai languages. Proto-Hlai reconstructions include those of Matisoff (1988), Thurgood (1991), Ostapirat (2004), and Norquest (2007).

== Phonology ==
The following displays the phonological features of the modern Hlai dialects:

=== Consonants ===
		Bilabial	Labio- dental	Alveolar		Alveolo- palatal	Velar		Glottal		
		Bilabial	Labio- dental	plain	sibilant	Alveolo- palatal	plain	labial	plain	lab.	pal.
Nasal		m	(ɱ)	n		ȵ	ŋ	ŋʷ			
Plosive/ Affricate	tenuis	p		t	ts	ȶ	k	kʷ	ʔ	ʔʷ	ʔʲ
Plosive/ Affricate	aspirated	pʰ		tʰ	tsʰ		kʰ	kʰʷ			
Plosive/ Affricate	voiced	ɓ		ɗ			ɡ	ɡʷ			
Fricative	voiceless		f	ɬ	s		x		h	hʷ	hʲ
Fricative	voiced		v		z		ɣ				
Approximant				l							
Trill				r							

- /ɓ, ɗ/ are implosives.
- [f, ɬ] mainly occur word-initially in various dialects.
  - [ɬ] may also be realized as an affricate [tɬ].
- [x, ɣ] mainly occur in the Xifang dialects.
  - [ɣ] can also occur as an allophone of /ɡ/.
- /ts, tsʰ, z/ are realized as alveolo-palatal [tɕ, tɕʰ, ɕ] in various dialects.
- /r/ may be realized as [ɾ, dɾ].
- For a brief period of time, Yuanmen had a cross-linguistically rare phonemic contrast between /m, ɱ/; the latter was derived from earlier /*ŋw/ and soon merged with /m/.

=== Vowels ===
	Front	Central	Back
Close	i	ɯ	u
Close-mid	e	ə	o
Open-mid	ɛ	ə	ɔ
Open		a	

- /ɯ/ is an unrounded back vowel.
- /a, i, e, o/ may have the allophones [ɐ, ɪ, ɛ, ɔ] in some dialects.
- /ɛ, ɔ/ are common in the Baisha and Jiamao dialects.
- /ə/ occurs in some dialects.

== History ==
Liang & Zhang (1996:18–21) conclude that the original homeland of the Hlai languages was the Leizhou Peninsula, and estimate that the Hlai had migrated across the Hainan Strait to Hainan Island about 4,000 years before present.

According to Ostapirat (2026), Hlai originated much further to the southwest from north-central Vietnam. The ancestors of present-day Hlai speakers migrated directly to southern Hainan but not northern Hainan, since they followed a migration route that skipped the Leizhou Peninsula.

== See also ==
- Proto-Hlai reconstructions (Wiktionary)
- Has Hlai grammar
- Hlai people
- Proto-Hlai language

== Bibliography ==
- Ostapirat, Weera (2005). "The Cun Language, by Ouyang Jueya. Shanghai Far East Publishers. 1998" (PDF). Linguistics of the Tibeto-Burman Area. 28 (1): 99–105.
- Ouyang, Jueya 欧阳觉亚; Zheng, Yiqing 郑贻青 (1983). Líyǔ diàochá yánjiū 黎语调查研究 [Li Language Investigation and Research] (in Chinese). Beijing: Zhongguo shehui kexue chubanshe.
