= Kra–Dai-speaking peoples =

Ethnic groups of Asia

Tai
Distribution of the Tai–Kadai (Kra–Dai)–speaking peoples:
Kra
Kam–Sui
Bê
Hlai
Northern Tai
Central Tai
Southwestern Tai

Regions with significant populations
- Cambodia, China, India, Laos, Malaysia, Burma, Singapore, Thailand and Vietnam

Languages
- Kra–Dai languages, Mandarin Chinese (in China)

Religion
- Theravada Buddhism, Animism, Shamanism

The term Kra–Dai peoples or Kra–Dai-speaking peoples refers collectively to the ethnic groups of southern China and Southeast Asia, stretching from Hainan to Northeast India and from southern Sichuan to Laos, Thailand and parts of Vietnam, who not only speak languages belonging to the Kra–Dai language family, but also share similar traditions, culture and ancestry. (Note: There is some ambiguity as to the use of the term Tai peoples, as some of the peoples speaking languages in branches of the Kra–Dai language family other than the Tai languages may also call themselves Tai. Therefore the term nuclear Tai peoples is used when discussing speakers of Tai languages.)

== Origin ==
Chamberlain (2016) proposes that the Kra–Dai language family was formed as early as the 12th century BCE in the middle of the Yangtze basin, coinciding roughly with the establishment of the state of Chu and the beginning of the Zhou dynasty. Following the southward migrations of Kra and Hlai (Rei/Li) peoples around the 8th century BCE, the Yue (Be-Tai people) started to break away and move to the east coast in the present-day Zhejiang, in the 6th century BCE, forming the state of Yue and conquering the state of Wu shortly thereafter.

According to Chamberlain, the Yue (Be-Tai) began to migrate southwards along the east coast of China to what are now Guangxi, Guizhou, and northern Vietnam after Yue was conquered by Chu around 333 BCE. There they formed the Luo Yue, who moved into Lingnan and northern Vietnam, and then westward into northeastern Laos and Sip Song Chau Tai, and later became the Central-Southwestern Tai, followed by the Xi Ou, which became the Northern Tai).

Tao et al. (2023), however, suggests that the Kra-Dai language family originated from coastal south China, around the Fujian, Guangdong, and Guangxi provinces, and underwent a radial expansion into the Guizhou-Yunnan region, Hainan Island, and Mainland Southeast Asia. This language dispersal might also be associated with environmental change and demographic changes.

Sagart (2004) hypothesized that the Kra–Dai languages may have originated in Taiwan. The Kra–Dai-speaking peoples migrated to southern China, where they brought with them the Proto-Kra–Dai language. They may originally have been associated with the Austronesian peoples. Unlike the Malayo-Polynesian-speaking group that sailed south to the Philippines and other parts of maritime Southeast Asia, the ancestors of the modern Kra–Dai people sailed west to mainland China and possibly traveled along the Pearl River, where their language greatly changed from other Austronesian languages under the influence of the Sino-Tibetan and Hmong–Mien languages. However, no archaeological evidence has been identified which would correspond to this Daic expansion in its earliest phases.

Aside from linguistic evidence, the connection between Austronesian and Kra–Dai can also be seen in shared cultural practices. Roger Blench (2008) demonstrates that tooth ablation, face tattooing, teeth blackening, and snake worship are shared between the Taiwanese indigenous peoples and the Kra–Dai peoples of southern China.

Several theories suggest that Kra-Dai peoples are closely related to Austronesians, especially Taiwanese indigenous peoples. They may have descended from a local Austronesian-related lineage in continental southeast China, ranging from Zheijiang to Guangdong, with additional gene flow from an Austroasiatic-related lineage. Genetic characteristics of the Baiyue are also well-preserved in Kra-Dai groups from South China and mainland Southeast Asia, although it's likely that the Baiyue themselves were multi-ethnic. It's believed that Austronesian and Kra-Dai lineages split around 7,000 years ago.

According to Ostapirat (2026), Be originated from the present-day borderlands of Guangxi, China and northern Vietnam, while Hlai originated much further to the southwest from north-central Vietnam. The Be migrated to northern Hainan via the Leizhou Peninsula. Meanwhile, Hlai speakers migrated directly to southern Hainan but not northern Hainan, since they followed a migration route that skipped the Leizhou Peninsula. Jiamao also originated from northern Vietnam. Kra languages display contact influence with Hmong-Mien and Austroasiatic, displaying lexical similarities with Khmuic in particular.

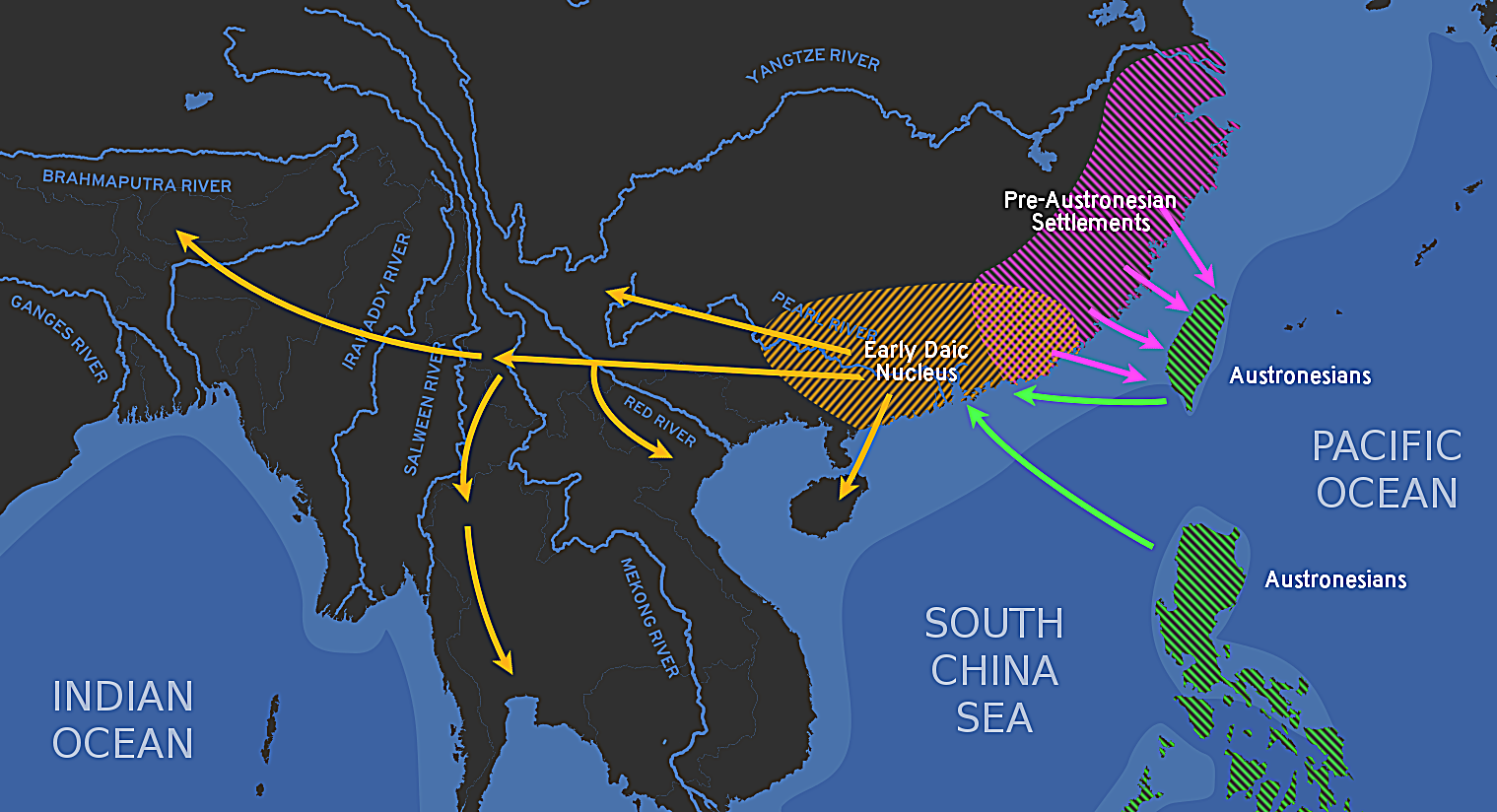
Proposed genesis of Daic languages and their relation with Austronesian languages (Blench, 2018)

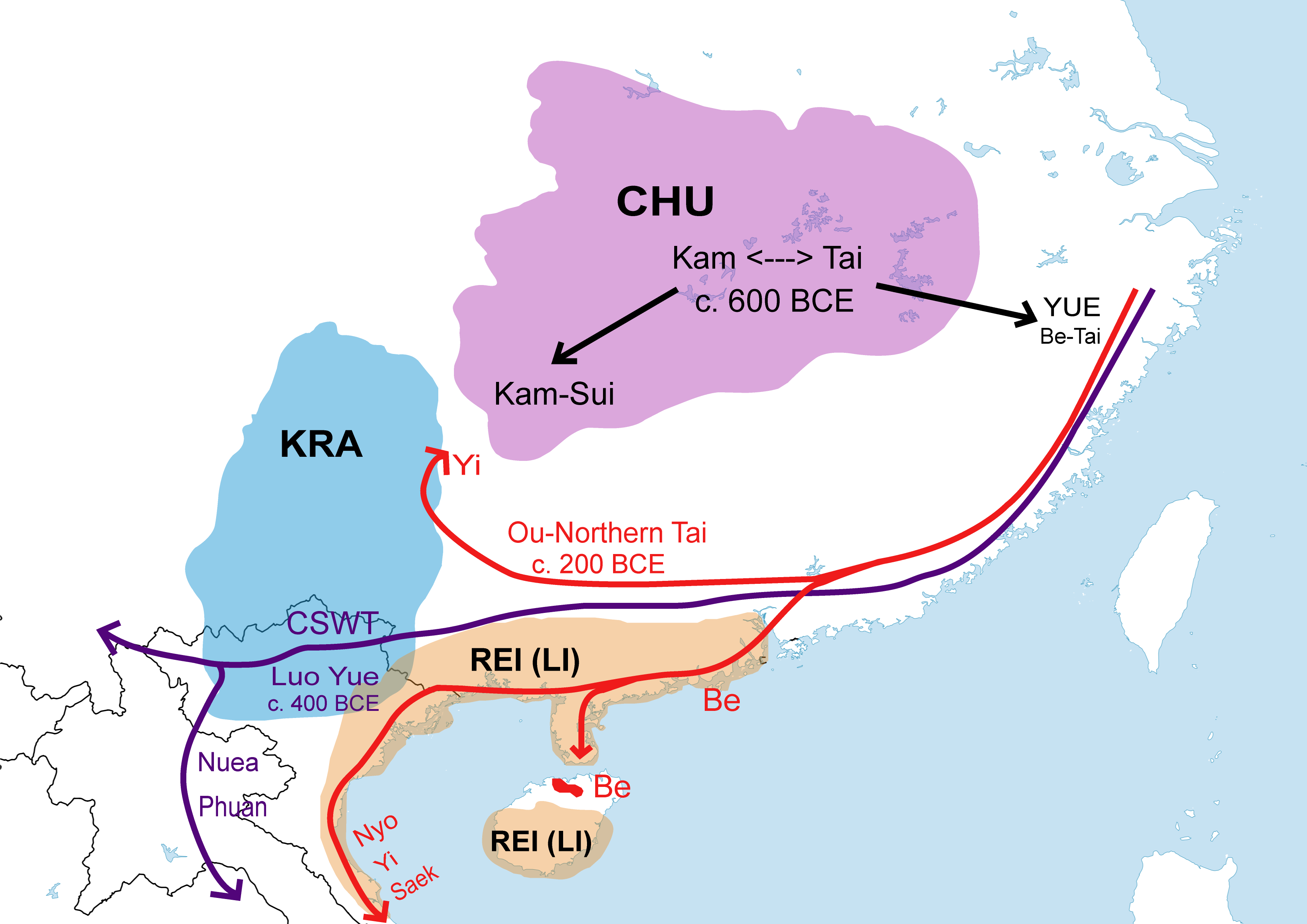
Kra-Dai migration route according to James R. Chamberlain (2016).

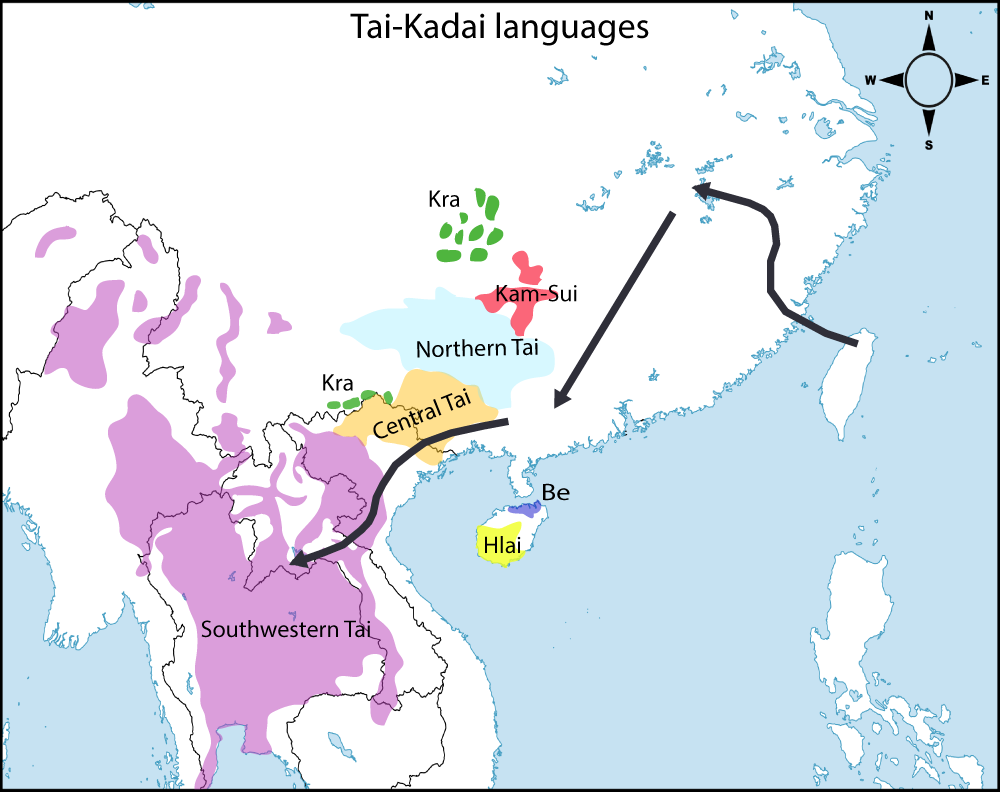
Kra–Dai migration route according to Matthias Gerner's Northeast to Southwest Hypothesis.

== Linguistic subdivisions ==
There are five established branches of the Kra–Dai languages, which may not directly correspond to ethnicity:

- the Tai peoples of China and much of Southeast Asia (including most notably the Thai, Lao, Isan, Shan and Zhuang, and Saek people of Laos and Thailand)
- the Hlai people and Be people of China, especially on Hainan
- the Kra peoples of China and Vietnam (also known as the Geyan peoples)
- the Kam–Sui peoples (which may or not include the Biao people) in central China

The Lakkia people of Guangxi Autonomous Region of China (Tai Lakka in neighboring portions of Vietnam) are ethnically of Yao, but speak a Kra–Dai language called Lakkia. These Yao were likely in an area dominated by Tai speakers and assimilated an early Kra–Dai language (possibly the language of the ancestors of the Biao people).

- The Lingao people in Hainan Province of China speak a Kra–Dai language called Be or Lincheng, although the ethnicity of the Lingao traces back to the Han nationality.

== Geographic distribution ==
The Kra-Dai have historically resided in China, continental Southeast Asia and parts of northeastern India since the early Kra-Dai expansion period. Their primary geographic distribution in those countries roughly forms an arc extending from northeastern India through southern China and down to Southeast Asia. Recent Kra-Dai migrations have brought considerable numbers of Kra-Dai peoples to Japan, Taiwan, Sri Lanka, the United Arab Emirates, Europe, Australia, New Zealand, North America and Argentina as well. The greatest ethnic diversity among the Kra-Dai is found in China, their prehistoric homeland.

The Kra peoples are clustered in the Guangxi, Guizhou, Yunnan, Hunan and Hainan provinces of China, as well as the Hà Giang, Cao Bằng, Lào Cai and Sơn La provinces of Vietnam.

The Kam–Sui peoples are clustered in China as well as neighboring portions of northern Laos and Vietnam.

=== List of Kra–Dai-speaking peoples per country ===
==== China ====
In southern China, people speaking Kra-Dai languages are mainly found in Guangxi, Guizhou, Yunnan, Hunan, Guangdong, and Hainan. According to statistics from the 1990 Chinese census, the total population of these groups was 23,262,000. Their distribution is as follows:

- Dai (or Tai) have a population of about 19 million, mainly inhabiting Guangxi, Yunnan, Guangdong and parts of Guizhou and Hunan provinces.
- Kam-Sui (Kam-Shui) have a population of about 4 million and live mainly in Hunan, Guizhou, and in Guangxi.
- Kra have a population of about 22,000 and live mostly in Yunnan, Guangxi and Hunan.

The following is a list of the Kra–Dai ethnic groups in China:

===== Tai and Rauz peoples =====
- Thai (Central Thai)
- Bouyei
- Tai Chong (Thai: ไทชอง tai chong)
- Dai (Thai: ไทลื้อ tai léu), including the Lu, Han Tai, Huayao Tai and Paxi people
- Tai Dam
- Dong (Chinese: 侗族, Thai: ต้ง), including the Northern and Southern Dong people
- E (Thai: อี๋ ĕe)
- Tai Eolai (Thai: ไทเอวลาย Tai eo laai)
- Fuma (Thai: ฟูมะ Fū ma)
- Hongjin Tai
- White Thai people
- Tai Kaihua (Thai: ไทไขหัว tai kăi hŭa)
- Kang
- Tai Lai (Thai: ไทลาย tai laai)
- Minggiay (Thai: มิงเกีย ming-gia)
- Mo
- Isan people
- Tai Nuea (Thai: ไทเหนือ tai nĕua), including the Tai Mao and Tai Pong people
- Pachen (Thai: ปาเชน bpaa chayn)
- Tai Payee (Thai: ไทปายี่ tai bpaa yêe)
- Pemiayao (Thai: เปเมียว bpay-mia wor)
- Pulachee (Thai: ปูลาจี bpoo-laa jee)
- Pulungchee (Thai: ปูลุงจี bpoo-lung-jee)
- Puyai (Thai: ปู้ใย่ bpôo)
- San Chay (also referred to as the Cao Lan people)
- Shan (Thai: ไทใหญ่ yài tai), including the Cun (Thai: ไทขึน)
- Tay (Thai: โท้)
- Thuchen (Thai: ตูเชน dtoo chayn)
- Thula (Thai: ตุลา dtù-laa)
- Tai Ya people (Thai: ไทหย่า tai yàa)
- Yoy (Thai: ไทย้อย tai yói)
- Tay (including the Tho people)
- Zhuang (Thai: จ้วง jûang), including the Buyang, Dianbao, Pusha, Tulao, Yongchun and Nùng (Thai: ไทนุง) people

===== Hlai people =====
The Hlai reside primarily, if not completely, on Hainan island province in China.

===== Kra peoples =====
The Kra peoples are clustered in the Guangxi, Guizhou, Yunnan, Hunan and Hainan provinces of China, as well as the Hà Giang, Cao Bằng, Lào Cai and Sơn La provinces of Vietnam.

===== Kam–Sui peoples =====
- Bouyei of Guizhou (including Ai-Cham, Mak and T'en, although most Bouyei are nuclear Tai)
- Kam of Guizhou, Hunan, and Guangxi, referred to as the Dong in China
- Mulao of Guizhou
- Maonan of Guangxi
- Sui of Guizhou, Yunnan, and Guangxi; also referred to as the Shui

====== Cao Miao people ======
The Cao Miao people of Guizhou, Hunan, and Guangxi speak a Kam–Sui language called Mjiuniang, although they are believed to be of Hmong–Mien descent.

====== Kang people ======
The Tay Khang of Yunnan and Laos speak a Kam–Sui language but are ethnically related to the Dai people.

===== Biao =====
The Biao are clustered in Guangdong, China.

===== Lakkia people =====
The Lakkia are an ethnic group clustered in the Guangxi Province of China and neighboring portions of Vietnam, whose members are of Yao descent, but speak a Tai–Kadai language called Lakkia. These Yao were likely in an area dominated by Tai speakers and assimilated an early Tai–Kadai language (possibly the language of the ancestors of the Biao people).

===== Lingao people =====
The Lingao are an ethnic group clustered in Hainan, China whose members are classified as Han Chinese under Chinese nationality law, but speak a Tai–Kadai language called Lincheng.

==== Laos ====
===== Nuclear Tai peoples =====
- Tai Daeng
- Tai Dam
- Tai Gapong
- Tai He
- Tay Khang
- Tai Kao
- Kongsat
- Kuan (Population of 2,500 in Laos)
- Tai Laan
- Tai Maen
- Northern Thai (Lanna)
- Lao (Population of 3,000,000 in Laos)
- Lao Lom
- Tai Long
- Dai (Population of 134,100 in Laos including the Lu people))
- Northeastern Thai (including the Lao Kaleun and Isan people)
- Tai Nuea
- Nùng
- Nyaw
- Tai Pao
- Tai Peung
- Phuan (Population of 106,099 in Laos)
- Phutai (Population of 154,400 in Laos)
- Pu Ko
- Rien
- Tai Sam
- Tayten
- Yoy
- Zhuang (including the Nùng people)
- Shan
- Yang
- Thai (Central Thai)

===== Kam–Sui peoples =====
The Kam–Sui peoples are clustered in China as well as neighboring portions of northern Laos and Vietnam.

===== Saek people =====
The center of the Saek population is the Mekong River in central Laos. A smaller Saek community makes its home in the Isan region of northeast Thailand, near the border with Laos.

==== Thailand ====
===== Nuclear Tai peoples =====
- Chiang Saeng
  - Central Thai (Thai and Khorat Thai)
  - Northern Thai (Tai Wang, Lanna and Thai Yuan)
  - Southern Thai (including the Tak Bai Thai people)
  - Tai Dam
  - Tai Daeng
  - Phuan
  - Tai Song
- Lao–Phutai
  - Lao (Lao Loum, Lao Ga, Lao Lom, Lao Ti, Lao Wiang and Lao Krang)
  - Northeastern Thai (Tai Kaleun and Isan)
  - Phutai
  - Nyaw
- Northwestern Tai
  - Shan
  - Lu
  - Tai Nuea (including the Tai Mao people)
- Tai Bueng
- Tai Gapong
- Khün
- Lao Ngaew
- Nyong
- Yoy

===== Saek people =====
The center of the Saek population is the Mekong River in central Laos. A smaller Saek community makes its home in the Isan region of northeast Thailand, near the border with Laos.

==== Vietnam ====
===== Nuclear Tai peoples =====
- Buyei
- Tày Tac
- Tai Chong
- Tai Daeng
- Tai Dam
- Giáy
- Tai La
- Tsun-Lao
- Tai Kao
- Lao
- Dai
- Tai Man Thanh
- Nang
- Zhuang (including the Nùng people)
- Phutai
- Tai Taosao
- Tay (including the Tho people)
- Tai Do (including the Tay Muoi and Tay Jo people)
- Tai Yung
- Ka Lao
- Thu Lao
- Tai So
- Tai Chiang
- Tai Lai
- Pu Thay
- Tai Hang Thong
- San Chay (also referred to as the Cao Lan people)
- Lu
- Yoy

===== Kra peoples =====
- En people
- Gelao
- Lachi
- Laha
- Qabiao
- Sui

==== Myanmar ====
- Shan (including the Khamti people)
- Dai (including the Lu people)
- Lao
- Tai Khun
- Tai Yong
- Tai Nuea (including the Tai Mao people)
- Tai Laeng
- Tai Phake
- Thai (Central Thai)
- Tai Piw
- Tenasserim Thai

==== Cambodia ====
- Thai (Central Thai) (including the Thai descent in Koh Kong)
- Lao
- Shan
- Kula

==== India ====
The following groups are found in Assam, India:

- Ahom
- Tai Phake
- Khampti
- Khamyang
- Aiton
- Turung

== Genetics of Kra–Dai-speaking peoples ==
=== Li (2008) ===
The following table of Y-chromosome DNA haplogroup frequencies of modern Kra-Dai speaking peoples is from Li, et al. (2008).

Ethnolinguistic group	Language branch	n	C	D*	D1	F	M	K	O*	O1a*-M119	O1a2-M50	O2a*-M95	O2a1-M88	O3*-M122	O3a1-M121	O3a4-M7	O3a5-M134	O3a5a-M117	P
Qau (Bijie)	Kra	13		15.4				7.7	23.1			15.4		30.8				7.7	
Blue Gelao (Longlin)	Kra	30						3.3	13.3	60.0		16.7		3.3			3.3		
Lachi	Kra	30	3.3		3.3	13.3		13.3	16.7	6.7		10.0		3.3			6.7	23.3	
Mulao (Majiang)	Kra	30	10.0					3.3	13.3	3.3	3.3	63.3		3.3					
Red Gelao (Dafang)	Kra	31	3.2					6.5	22.6	22.6		16.1		12.9				16.1	
White Gelao (Malipo)	Kra	14							35.7	14.3		42.9					7.1		
Buyang (Yerong)	Kra	16										62.5	6.3	18.8			12.5		
Paha	Kra	32		3.1		6.3		6.3	9.4	3.1		71.9							
Qabiao	Kra	25							32.0	4.0		60.0					4.0		
Hlai (Qi, Tongza)	Hlai	34							35.3	32.4		29.4						2.9	
Cun	Hlai	31	3.2					6.5	9.7	38.7				38.7				3.2	
Jiamao	Hlai	27							25.9	51.9		22.2							
Lingao	Be	30						3.3	16.7	26.7		13.3		3.3			10.0	26.7	
E	Northern Tai	31	3.2			3.2		9.7	16.1	6.5		54.8		3.2			3.2		
Zhuang, Northern (Wuming)	Northern Tai	22							13.6		4.6	72.7			4.6			4.6	
Zhuang, Southern (Chongzuo)	Central Tai	15							13.3	20.0		60.0	6.7						
Caolan	Central Tai	30	10.0					10.0	53.3	3.3		20.0					3.3		
Biao	Kam–Sui	34	2.9						5.9	14.7		17.7		52.9					5.9
Lakkia	Kam–Sui	23	4.4	52.2				4.4				8.7		26.1		4.4			
Kam (Sanjiang)	Kam–Sui	38	21.1					5.3	10.5			39.5		10.5			2.6	10.5	
Sui (Rongshui)	Kam–Sui	50				8.0		10.0		18.0		44.0					20.0		
Mak & Ai-Cham	Kam–Sui	40						2.5				87.5		5.0			2.5		2.5
Mulam	Kam–Sui	40	2.5		12.5	7.5		5.0		5.0	25.0	30.0		7.5			5.0		
Maonan	Kam–Sui	32	9.4			9.4		15.6				56.3		9.4					
Then	Kam–Sui	30		3.3					3.3	33.3		50.0						6.7	3.3
Cao Miao	Kam–Sui	33						8.2		10.0		3.0		66.7			12.1		

=== Full genome analysis ===
The core Kra-Dai population from Southern China has more Late Neolithic Fujianese-related ancestry (39.0%–53.9%) than Neolithic Mekong-related ancestry (24.9%–32.3%), which was similarly observed for present Southeastern Han Chinese (28.9%–40.3% for Late Neolithic Fujianese and 21.8%–25.2% for Neolithic Mekong). Alternatively, they are modeled as having Atayal-related ancestry at ~3–38% or 50%, with the rest being Yellow River or Tibetan-related. There's also evidence of strong affinities between Kra-Dai groups and ancient Guangxi populations, such as GaoHuaHua, BaBanQinCen, LaCen and ShenXian, who are characterized by their mixture of indigenous Guangxi ancestry and Yellow River-related Northern East Asian ancestry. Using the Dai as proxies for the ancestral Kra-Dai population, they can also be modeled as a mixture of North Indian-related (6%) and Naxi/Miao-related groups (94%).

Hlai people are considered to be one of the most isolated Kra-Dai groups, with minimal foreign admixture. They could be modeled as having Austronesian-related ancestry and to a lesser extent, Austroasiatic-related and Northeast Asian-related ancestries. In particular, they cluster with Austronesians that harbor more divergent ancestry, such as the Ami, Atayal, and Kankanaey. Compared to other Kra-Dai groups, the Hlai have less genetic input from ancient Guangxi populations and Han Chinese and tenuously have no Denisovan introgression. These findings suggest that Hlai and Ami/Atayal form a 'clean clade'. However, there is evidence of substantial Han Chinese admixture in some Hlai. In addition, the Kinh Vietnamese diverged from Hlai much earlier than the Dai diverged from Hlai. Other studies suggest that Longli Bouyei and Qiandongnan Dong are equally as good as Hlai in representing the ancestral Kra-Dai population. This is evident by how they cluster with Iron Age Taiwanese populations like Gongguan and Hanben, along with Neolithic to Bronze Age Fujianese populations like Xitoucun and Tanshishan. They also cluster with Kinh Vietnamese.

Kra-Dai groups like the Gelaos (from Daozhen, Guiyang, Longlin or Zunyi), Dong (from Hunan, Guizhou, Qiandongnan), Longli Bouyei and Guangxi Zhuang share more alleles with Ancient Northern East Asian-related groups, who are closely related to Neolithic millet farmers from the Yellow River basin. Meanwhile, groups like Dai, Hlai and other Kra-Dai groups in Southeast Asia share more alleles with Ancient Southern East Asian-related groups. However, Longli Bouyei and Qiandongnan Dong have slightly more Ancient Southern East Asian-related ancestry. Overall, a genetic cline exists for Kra-Dai groups, with Taiwan Hanben-related ancestry increasing in southern Kra-Dai groups.

A common haplogroup among Kra-Dai peoples is O1a-M119, which increases further east in China. It is also more common among Taiwanese aborigines than Austronesian populations from Southeast Asian islands. Haplogroup O1b1a1a (O-M95) is likewise common in groups like Hlai, Dai and Kinh Vietnamese. Maternal haplogroups B, C and D are common for Kra-Dai peoples in Mainland Southeast Asia whilst M7b and M7c are common for all Austronesians and Kra-Dai peoples.

==== Contributions to East and Southeast Asian populations ====
There is evidence that Kra-Dai ancestry represents the 'southern ancestry' that was introduced in the ancestors of Han Chinese although this ancestry increases further south in China. This ancestry can also be represented by Taiwan Hanben ancestry.

Han Chinese from Fujian and Guangdong show excessive ancestries from Late Neolithic Fujianese sources (35.0–40.3%). This Late Neolithic Fujianese ancestry peaks in present Ami, Atayal and Kankanaey (66.9–74.3%) and are less significant in Han Chinese from Zhejiang (22%), Jiangsu (17%) and Shandong (8%). This suggests a significant genetic contribution from Kra–Dai-speaking peoples, or groups related to them, to Southern Han Chinese. Other studies suggest actual ancient population admixture between Ami and Atayal and Han Chinese from Guangdong and Sichuan. This admixture is also present in the ancestors of Taiwanese Han. Han Chinese from Fujian and Guangdong also have ancestry from Neolithic Mekong sources but this is less significant (21.8–23.6%). Guangxi Han, who possess the lowest Northern East Asian ancestry among Han subgroups (33.8 ± 4.8%), are believed to descend from Kra-Dai speakers who adopted Chinese dialects. Both Guangxi and Hainan Han are also closely related to Guangdong Han. However, there is evidence that Han Chinese from Northern Guangxi have more Southeast Asian-related ancestry, which is closely related to Austronesian, Kra-Dai and Austroasiatic groups, than those from Southern Guangxi. Overall, Cantonese, Taiwanese Han and Fujianese are considered to be the most southern-shifted Han subgroups. Southern Chinese also significantly share a genetic component that's more abundant in Dai and Kinh Vietnamese.

Among Kra-Dai groups in Northeast Thailand near the Laos border, there is 95% Lao-related ancestry although Bru have <1% Lao-related ancestry due to being an isolated Austroasiatic group. Lao-related ancestry makes up >50% of the ancestry of Central Thai whilst southern Thai have 66% Nayu-related ancestry, which is a mixture of Austroasiatic, Austronesian and Kra-Dai. Zhuang-related ancestry also makes up 41% of the ancestry found in Kra-Dai groups in northern Thailand. These findings reflect historic migrations of Kra-Dai groups to Thailand via Laos or the heavy assimilation of Laotians by Thais. Compared to other Austroasiatic groups in Southeast Asia, Laotians have high affinities with Kra-Dai groups from China. Whilst Kinh Vietnamese also have high affinities with Kra-Dai groups, they exhibit admixture with Austroasiatic groups from Mainland Southeast Asia although this can be observed for Laotians to a lesser extent.
