= Peopling of Thailand =

History of Thailand's population groups

Chart shows the peopling of Thailand.

The peopling of Thailand refers to the process by which the ethnic groups that comprise the population of present-day Thailand came to inhabit the region.

== Gradual inland migration of Tai peoples from China ==
The Tai migration from the northern mountains into Thailand and Laos was a slow process, with the Tai generally remaining near the mountainous area in the region, where they were able to use their specialized agricultural knowledge relating to the use of mountain water for rice production. The earliest Tai settlements in Thailand were in the river valleys in the northern reaches of the country.

Eventually, the Tai settled the central plains of Thailand (which were covered with dense rainforest) and displaced and inter-bred with the pre-existing Austroasiatic population. The languages and culture of the Tai eventually came to dominate the regions of both modern-day Laos and Thailand. In more recent times, many of the Tai tribes of Laos also migrated west across the border, establishing communities in Thailand. The Laotian Tai ethnic groups, often referred to as the Lao, are largely clustered in the Isan region of Thailand.

=== Origin of the Tai peoples ===
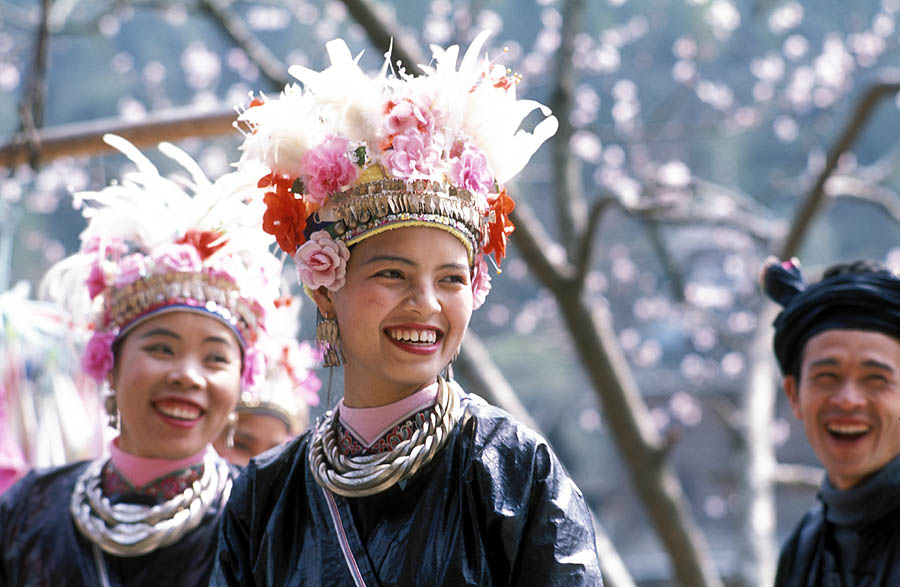
Tai-Dong people of Guizhou, China, in traditional dresses, similar to the existing tribe in northern provinces of Thailand

Comparative linguistic research seems to indicate that the Tai peoples were a Proto-Tai–Kadai speaking culture of southern China and dispersed into mainland Southeast Asia. Many linguists propose that the Tai–Kadai peoples may be genetically connected with Proto-Austronesian speaking peoples. Laurent Sagart (2004) hypothesized that the Tai–Kadai peoples migrated from a homeland on the island of Taiwan, where they spoke a dialect of Proto-Austronesian or one of its descendant languages. The ancestors of the modern Tai-Kadai peoples sailed west to mainland China and possibly traveled along the Pearl River, where their language greatly changed from other Austronesian languages under the influence of Sino-Tibetan and Hmong–Mien language infusion. Aside from linguistic evidence, the connection between Austronesian and Tai-Kadai can also be found in some common cultural practices. Roger Blench (2008) demonstrates that dental evulsion, face tattooing, teeth blackening and snake cults are shared between the Taiwanese Austronesians and the Tai-Kadai peoples of Southern China.

James R. Chamberlain (2016) proposes that the Tai-Kadai (Kra-Dai) language family was formed as early as the 12th century BCE in the middle of the Yangtze basin, coinciding roughly with the establishment of the Chu state and the beginning of the Zhou dynasty. Following the southward migrations of Kra and Hlai (Rei/Li) peoples around the 8th century BCE, the Yue (Be-Tai people) started to break away and move to the east coast in the present-day Zhejiang province, in the 6th century BCE, forming the state of Yue and conquering the state of Wu shortly thereafter. According to Chamberlain, Yue people (Be-Tai) began to migrate southwards along the east coast of China to what are now Guangxi, Guizhou and northern Vietnam, after Yue was conquered by Chu around 333 BCE. There the Yue (Be-Tai) formed the Luo Yue, which moved into Lingnan and Annam and then westward into northeastern Laos and Sip Song Chau Tai, and later became the Central-Southwestern Tai, followed by the Xi Ou, which became the Northern Tai).

The Tai peoples, from Guangxi began moving south – and westwards in the first millennium CE, eventually spreading across the whole of mainland Southeast Asia. Based on layers of Chinese loanwords in proto-Southwestern Tai and other historical evidence, Pittayawat Pittayaporn (2014) proposes that the southwestward migration of southwestern Tai-speaking tribes from the modern Guangxi to the mainland of Southeast Asia must have taken place sometime between the 8th–10th centuries. Tai speaking tribes migrated southwestward along the rivers and over the lower passes into Southeast Asia, perhaps prompted by the Chinese expansion and suppression.

=== Tai ethnic fusion ===
Over the centuries, the Tai intermarried and absorbed many of the other populations who co-inhabited and/or politically occupied the region, particularly populations of Mon–Khmer, Burmese, and Chinese descent. This fusion of ethnicity has led to considerable genetic diversity in the modern Thai people, and has resulted in a Tai population that differs in culture, language, and apparel from the Tai ethnic groups who remained in China. Many of the individual Tai ethnic groups have assumed a common Thai identity and have adopted Thai cultural norms.

=== Individual Tai ethnic groups in Thailand ===
There are presently more than 30 distinct Tai ethnic groups in Thailand, contributing nearly 85 percent of the nation's population. The genetic stratification of the ethnic clades of the Tai ethnicity is an ongoing topic of debate among linguists and other social scientists.

== Continuous diverse Chinese immigration from the 13th century ==
The history of Chinese immigration to Thailand dates back many centuries, and the specific Chinese ethnic groups which made their way to Thailand are numerous, although there is a greater concentration of Chinese from the southern provinces due to their geographic proximity to Thailand. The Chinese are part of the greater Sino-Tibetan ethnicity which also includes the Tibeto-Burmans. The Chinese immigrants were largely able to merge into the predominant Tai culture, and have contributed significantly to the economy and infrastructure of Thailand over the years.

=== Chinese immigration during the Ayutthayan Period ===
Chinese traders in Thailand, mostly from Fujian and Guangdong Provinces, began arriving in Ayutthaya by at least the 13th century. Ayutthaya was under almost constant Burmese threat from the 16th century, and the Qianlong Emperor of the Qing Empire was alarmed by Burmese military might. From 1766-1769, the Qianlong Emperor sent his armies four times to subdue the Burmese, but all four invasions failed. Ayutthaya fell to the Burmese in 1767. During the Ayutthaya period, many Chinese traders and soldiers inter-married with local Tai, infusing Chinese culture into the population early in its history.

=== 18th and 19th century male Chinese immigration ===
In the late-18th century, King Taksin of Thonburi, who was himself half-Chinese, actively encouraged Chinese immigration and trade. Settlers came from Chaozhou prefecture in large numbers. By 1825, the population of Chinese in Thailand had reached 230,000, and it grew steadily due to a constant stream of Chinese immigrants to the country throughout the 19th century. Early Chinese immigration consisted almost entirely of Chinese men, who, of necessity, married Thai women. The children of such intermarriages were called luk-jin (ลูกจีน), meaning 'children of Chinese' in Thai.

=== 20th century immigration of Chinese families ===
The Chinese population in Thailand had risen to 792,000 by 1910. By 1932, approximately 12.2 percent of the population was ethnic Chinese. The corruption of the Qing dynasty and the massive population increase in China, combined with high taxes, caused many families to leave for Thailand in search of work and a better life. Those who came before the First World War came overland or by sailboats called sampans, while after World War II most arrived by steam ship. The earlier tradition of Chinese-Thai intermarriage declined once large numbers of Chinese women immigrated in the early-20th century. New arrivals frequently came as families and resisted assimilation, retaining their Chinese culture and living in all-Chinese areas. Despite this, newer generations of Thai-Chinese have still greatly integrated into Thai culture; second generation or higher Thai-Chinese mostly speak Thai as their primary language and do not speak a Chinese dialect.

== Lolo migration from Tibet via Burma ==
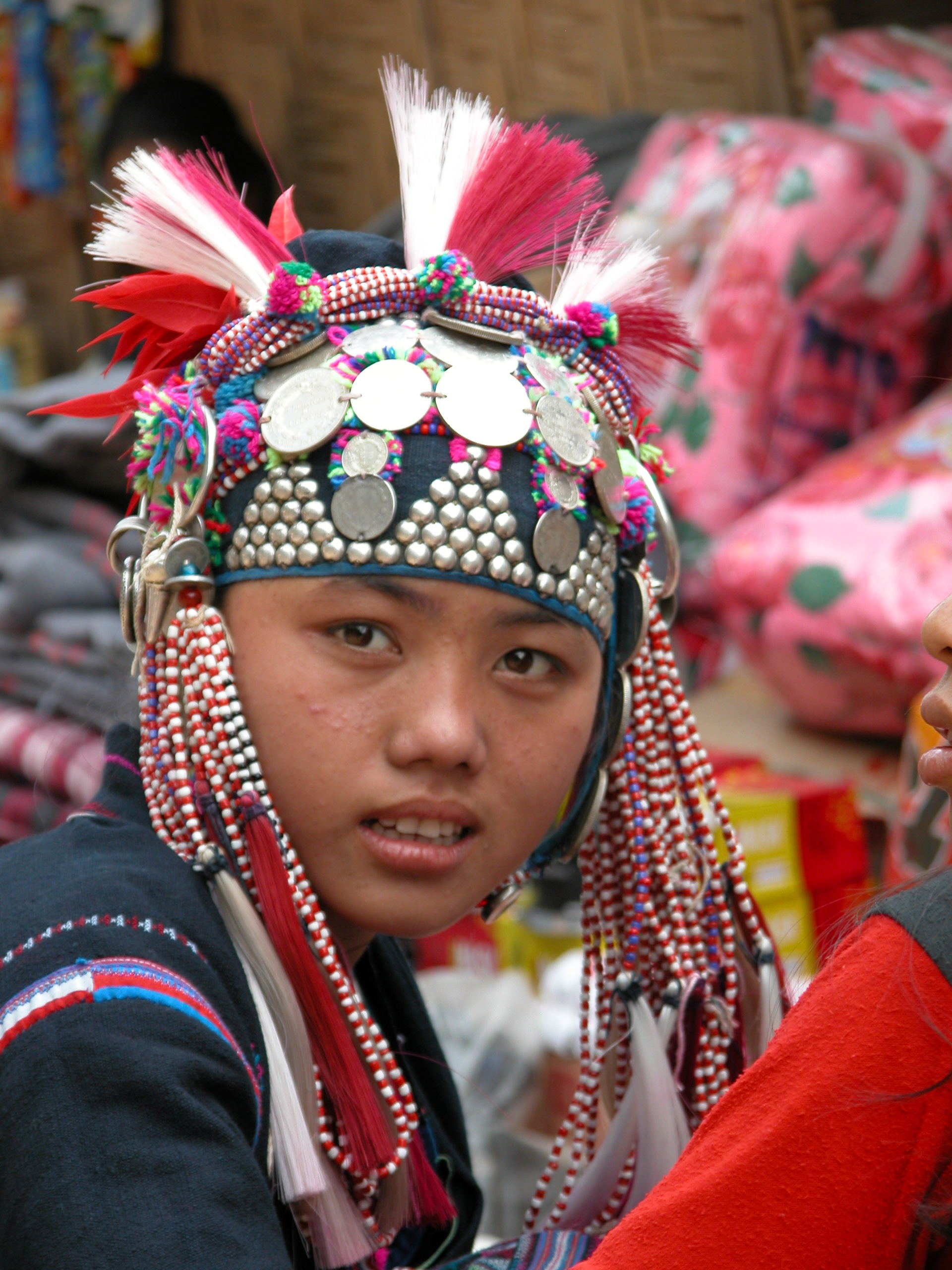
Loloish Akha tribe wearing traditional dress

Some Loloish tribes such as the Lisu arrived in Thailand as recently as 100 years ago, while others came at a much earlier date. The Lolo are believed to have descended from the ancient Qiang people of western China, who are also said to be the ancestors of the Tibetan, Naxi, and Qiang peoples. They migrated from southeastern Tibet through Sichuan and into Yunnan Province, where their largest populations can be found today.

=== Origin of the Lolo ===
The Lolo (also commonly referred to as the Yi) are one of the two major distinct Tibeto-Burmese ethnicities within present-day Thailand, along with the Karen. The Lolo migrated southeast from Burma into Thailand.

=== Individual Loloish ethnic groups in Thailand ===
The Loloish of Thailand are generally hill tribes in the northern portion of the country, near the border with Burma. A list of the Loloish ethnic groups of significant size within Thailand are as follows:

- Southern Loloish clade
  - Akha sub-clade
    - Akha (population of approximately 60,000 in Thailand, centered on Chiang Rai, Chiang Mai, and Mae Hong Son Provinces)
    - Lahu (population of approximately 52,000 in Thailand)
  - Bisu (population of approximately 1,000 in Thailand, centered on Chiang Rai and Lampang Provinces)
  - Mpi (population of approximately 1,200 within Thailand)
  - Phunoi
  - Ugong
- Northern Loloish clade
  - Lisu (population of approximately 16,000 in Thailand)

== Hmong–Mien migration from China via Laos ==
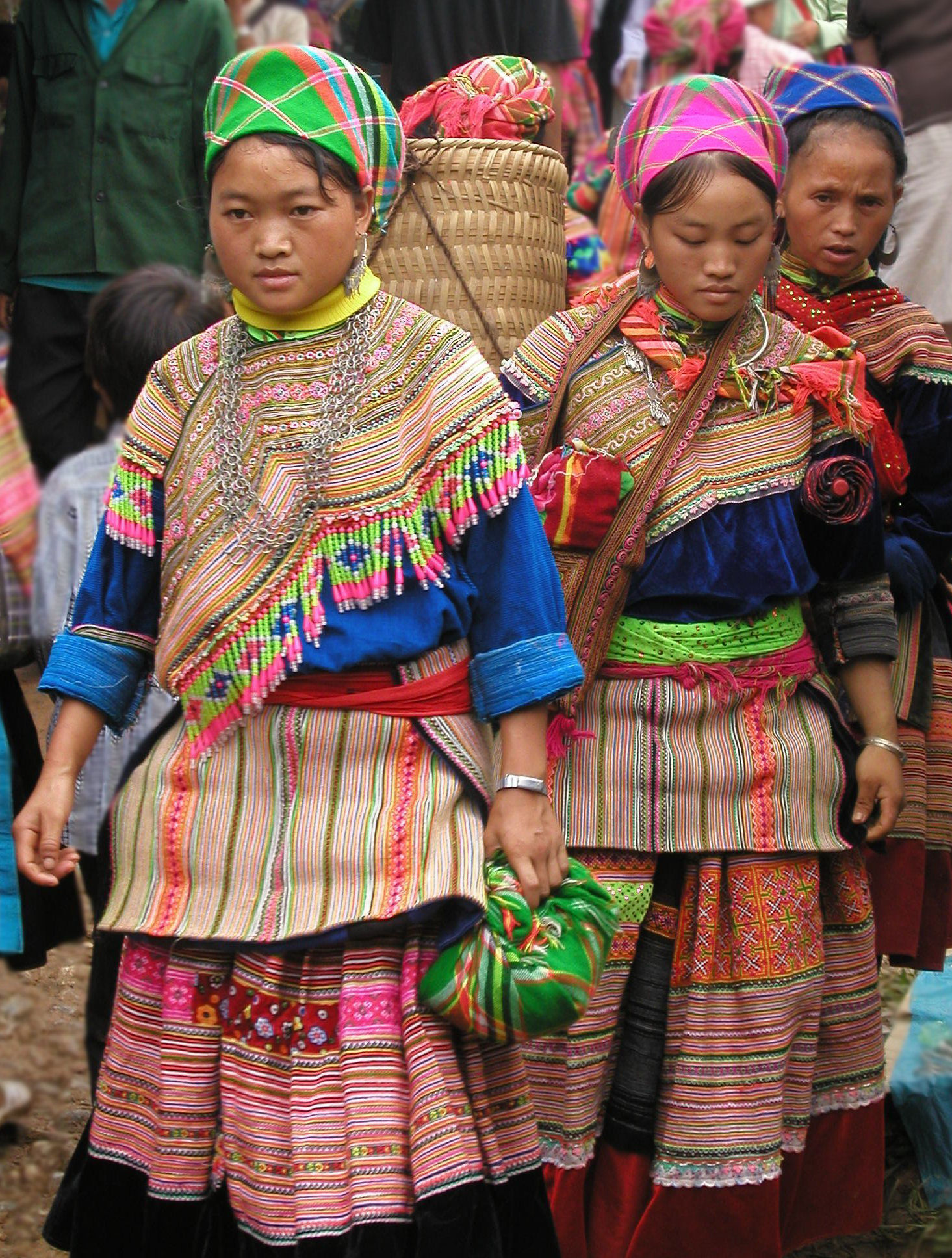
Women in traditional Hmong dress

Like the Lolo, many of the Hmong–Mien ethnic groups are among the hill tribes in Thailand. Their population is clustered in the northeastern region of Thailand near the Laotian border. The Hmong–Mien of Thailand generally migrated from China in the second half of the 19th century through Laos, where they established themselves for some time prior to their arrival in Thailand. An exception to the China-Laos-Thailand migration pattern is the Iu Mien people, who apparently passed through Vietnam during the 13th century, prior to entering Thailand through Laos. The Iu Mien arrived in Thailand approximately 200 years ago, contemporaneously with a large number of other Hmong–Mien migrants.

=== Origin of the Hmong–Mien peoples ===
The primary homeland of the Hmong–Mien ethnicity is said to be Kweichow, a province of southern China, where they settled at least 2,000 years ago.

== Karen arrival as refugees from Burma ==
The Karen left Tibet and migrated to Burma as refugees, establishing themselves along the Burmese border with Thailand. When during World War II the Japanese occupied Burma, long-term tensions between the Karen and Bamar turned into open fighting. After the war ended, Burma was granted independence in January 1948, and the Karen, led by the KNU, attempted to co-exist peacefully with the Bamar ethnic majority. However, in the fall of 1948, the Burmese government, led by U Nu, began raising and arming irregular political militias known as Sitwundan. In January 1949, some of these militias went on a rampage through Karen communities. In 2004, the BBC cited aid agencies estimates that up to 200,000 Karen were driven from their homes during decades of war, with 120,000 more refugees from Burma, mostly Karen, living in refugee camps on the Thai side of the Burmese-Thai border.

=== Origin of the Karen ===
The Karen people's ancestors were from Tibet, and are Tibeto-Burman, and therefore distantly related to the Lolo.

=== Individual Karen ethnic groups in Thailand ===
There are approximately 510,000 people of Karen descent living in Thailand. A list of the Karen ethnic groups of significant size within Thailand are:

- Pa'o
- Pwo clade
  - Phrae Pwo
  - Northern and Western Pwo
- Sgaw–Bghai clade
  - S'gaw
  - Kayah (population of approximately 100,000 in Thailand, centered on Mae Hong Son Province)

== See also ==
- Thai studies
