= Saek =

Saek may refer to:

- the Saek people
- the Saek language
