= Yongnan languages =

Kra–Dai language of southern China

Yongnan
- Yongnan Zhuang
- Region: China
- Native speakers: (1.8 million cited 2000)
- Language family: Kra–Dai: Tai; various Zhuang branches; Yongnan

Language codes
- ISO 639-3: zyn
- Glottolog: yong1275

Yongnan, or Yongnan Zhuang, is a dialect-bund sharing common features but not common innovations of Zhuang languages of southern China.

In the classification of Pittiyaporn (2009), Yongnan is not a single language, or even a natural group, but parts of two main branches of the Tai language family (clades C, I, and M):

- (clade C) Yongnan Zhuang of Chongzuo (崇左), Yongnan Zhuang of Shangsi (上思), Caolan of Vietnam*
- (clade D)
  - (clade I) Yongnan Zhuang of Qinzhou (钦州)
  - (clade J)
    - (clade M) Wuming (Shuangqiao) dialect (武鸣)*, Yongnan Zhuang proper (邕南), Yongnan Zhuang of Long'an (隆安), Yongnan Zhuang of Fusui (扶绥)
    - (clade N)* Northern Tai: Saek, Bouyei, and other Northern Zhuang

* Not considered Yongnan anywhere, nor considered Yongnan by Pittiyaporn but placed here to make the clade D monophyletic.

See Tai languages for details.

== Sources ==
- Pittayaporn, Pittayawat. 2009. The Phonology of Proto-Tai. Ph.D. dissertation. Department of Linguistics, Cornell University.
