= ZYB =

ZYB may refer to:

- ZYB, a former Danish mobile phone utility and social networking website with CEO Tommy Ahlers, sold to Vodafone in 2008
- Yongbei Zhuang, ISO 639 language code
- R-27 Zyb, a submarine-launched ballistic missile developed by the Soviet Union
- ZYB, a call sign designation used by television stations in Brazil
