= Ugong =

Ugong may refer to:

- Ugong language, an endangered language of Western Thailand, spoken in isolated pocket provinces.
- Ugong people a group of ethnic people in Thailand.
- Ugong, Pasig, a barangay in Pasig, Metro Manila, Philippines.
- Ugong Norte, Quezon City, a barangay in Quezon City, Metro Manila, Philippines.
- Ugong, Valenzuela, a barangay in Valenzuela, Metro Manila, Philippines.
