= Cao Lan language =

Tai language spoken in northern Vietnam

Cao Lan
- Man Cao-Lan
- Native to: Vietnam, China
- Native speakers: 170,000 (2009 census)
- Language family: Kra–Dai: Tai; mixed Northern Tai–Central Tai; Cao Lan

Language codes
- ISO 639-3: mlc
- Glottolog: caol1238

Cao Lan, sometimes Caolan or Man Cao-Lan, is a Tai language of northern Vietnam. It is spoken by the Cao Lan subgroup of the San Chay people. According to Pittayaporn (2009), it is closest to the Chongzuo and Shangsi Zhuang across the border in China, both of which are lumped under the apparently polyphyletic Yongnan Zhuang by Ethnologue. Together, Cao Lan, Chongzuo, and Shangsi form a primary branch of the Tai languages (Pittayaporn 2009).

== Demographics ==
Cao Lan is spoken by the Cao Lan subgroup of the San Chay people of Tuyên Quang Province. According to the people, the Cao Lan and Sán Chay peoples had arrived from southern China 400 years ago together as one group, even though they spoke two different languages. Notably, they both use Chinese characters to record their languages. Smaller numbers are also found in Xichou County, Yunnan, China and in the following provinces.

- Lào Cai
- Thái Nguyên
- Phú Thọ
- Bắc Ninh
- Lạng Sơn
- Quảng Ninh

== Classification ==
The Sán Chay speak a form of Chinese, while the Cao Lan speak a Tai language. Gregerson & Edmondson (1998) considers Caolan to have a combination of both Northern Tai and Central Tai features. Like the E language of northern Guangxi, Cao Lan also displays influences form Pinghua, a Chinese vernacular spoken in Guangxi, China. Haudricourt (1973) believes that the Cao Lan may have adopted a form of Tai when they had stopped in Guangxi during their historical southward migration. The Chinese-speaking Sán Chay, on the other hand, might have been a Yao (or Mienic-speaking) group, as the Yao of Fangcheng, Guangxi call themselves san˧ tɕai˧. Today, the Chinese-speaking Sán Chay live mostly in Quảng Ninh, whereas the Cao Lan are mostly concentrated in Tuyên Quang, Thái Nguyên, and Bắc Ninh.
