= Yoy people =

Ethnic group in Southeast Asia

Yoy
Total population
- 8,100

Regions with significant populations
- Thailand, Laos, Vietnam

Languages
- Thai, Lao, Yoy

Religion
- Theravada Buddhism

The Yoy people are an ethnic group in Southeast Asia.

== Other names and spellings ==
- Tai Jo
- Tai Yo
- Tai Yoi
- Tai Yoy
- Dioi
- Giy
- Yooi
- Yuai
- Lao Yuai
- Duoi
- Yoe
- Yooy

== Geographic distribution ==
- Population of 1,300 in Khammouan Province of Laos
- Population of 6,000 in Thailand
- Population of 800 in Vietnam

== Religions ==
- Theravada Buddhism (with Animism influence)
