= Peopling of China =

History of ancient China

In the course of the peopling of the World by Homo sapiens, East Asia was reached about 50,000 years ago (50 kya). The "recent African origin" lineage from 70 kya diverged into identifiable East Eurasian and West Eurasian lineages by about 50 kya. The East Eurasian ancestors of East Asians used a southern route to reach South and Southeast Asia, along which they rapidly diverged into the ancestors of Ancient Ancestral South Indians (AASI), Papuans, East Asians and Andamanese peoples (such as the Onge). This early East Asian lineage diverged further during the Last Glacial Maximum, spreading northwards from Mainland Southeast Asia where it significantly contributed to the peopling of the Americas via Beringia about 25 kya. After the last ice age, China was cut off from neighboring island groups. The phenotypes of early East Asians were either replaced or prevailed among more geographically distant groups.

== Genetic history ==
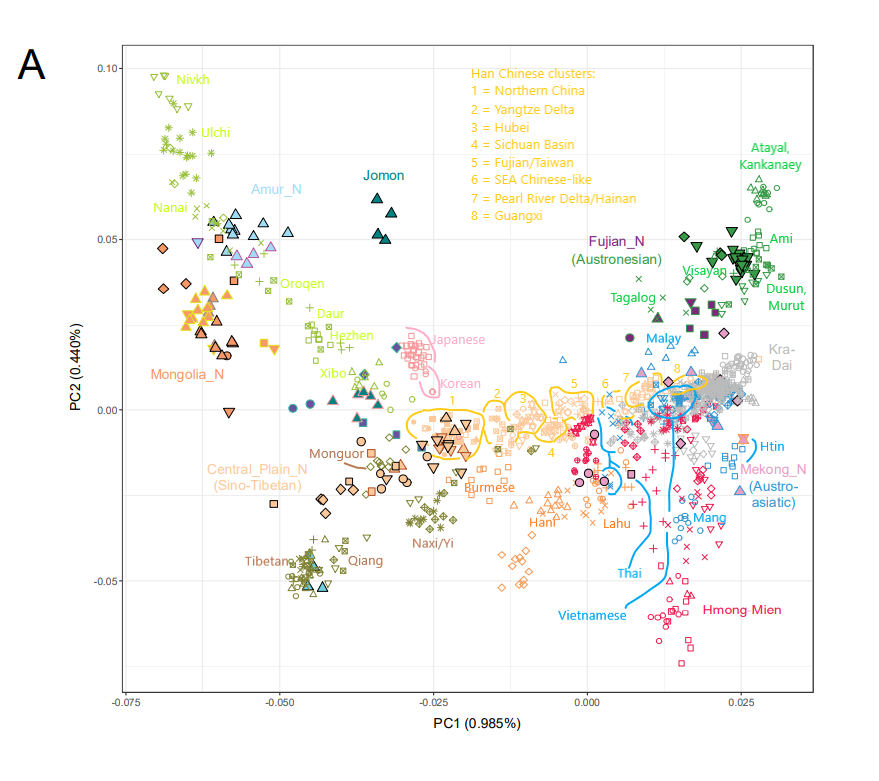
A population genomic PCA graph, showing the substructure of East Asian populations, including Han Chinese (2019)

=== Overview ===
A "Basal-East Asian population", referred to as the East and Southeast Asian lineage (ESEA), is ancestral to the Hoabinhian hunter-gatherers of Southeast Asia and the Tianyuan lineage found in Northern China and also, modern East Asians, Southeast Asians, Polynesians, and Siberians. The ESEA lineage descend from an earlier "eastern non-African" (ENA) or "Ancient East Eurasian" meta-population, which used a single southern route to reach South, Southeast Asia, and Oceania, and along which they rapidly diverged into the ancestors of Ancient South Asians (AASI), East/Southeast Asians (ESEA), as well as Australasians. This ESEA lineage later diverged into the Hoabinhian, the Tianyuan, and Ancient East Asian lineages, and expanded northward. The Ancient East Asian lineage later split into Ancient Southern East Asians and Ancient Northern East Asians. There is "a strong correlation with latitude, with diversity decreasing from south to north".

Basal Asian-related populations related to the Tianyuan man were widespread in across northern East Asia at least 40,000 years ago. However, they were replaced by an AR19K-related population near the end of the Last Glacial Maximum. This AR19K-related population carried EDAR_V370A variants, which was previously absent in East Asia. The AR19K-related population was basal to younger samples of Ancient Northern East Asians, who form a sister lineage to Ancient Southern East Asians, with both lineages diverging at least 19,000 years ago. Other studies suggest that the ancestors of ancient East Asians were a mixture of Tianyuan-related and Early Neolithic Xingyi-related lineages. Several ancient Northeast Asian individuals from inland East Asia (Yumin) and the Devil's Gate Cave (NEO240) can also be modeled as mixtures of deep lineages that are ancestral to the Jōmon and Tianyuan respectively, despite the latter being more related to the Jōmon. A distinct Ancient Northern East Asian lineage related to the ~11,000-year-old Donghulin individual from Beijing, China was detected and was believed to have diverged from the AR19K-related lineage. But other studies found that this lineage was a sublineage of AR19K and was ancestral to many inland Northern East Asians.

=== Archaeogenetic studies in the Central Plains ===
Neolithic Northern China can be divided into 4 periods: the Pre-Peiligang period (before 7000 BC), the Peiligang period (7000–5000 BC), the Yangshao period (5000–3000 BC), and the Longshan period (3000–2000 BC). The first two correlate with the initial development of Neolithic Chinese culture whilst the latter two correlate with the accelerated development of the Chinese civilization. Modern-day Shandong province in Northern China is home to a series of Neolithic archaeological cultures: Houli culture (6300–5400 BC), Beixin culture (5400–4200 BC), Dawenkou culture (4200–2600 BC), Shandong Longshan culture (2600–2000 BC) and Yueshi culture (1900–1500 BC).

The progenitors of the Han Chinese were Neolithic Yellow River farmers from the Central Plains, who constitute a distinct sublineage within Ancient Northern East Asians. They descend from Proto-Sino-Tibetan-speaking groups in the Yellow River regions, who diverged into Sinitic and Tibeto-Burman groups about 4–8 kya, and show high genetic affinities to Yumin hunter-gatherers. Yellow River groups were also genetically distinguishable from Early Neolithic Shandong hunter-gatherers, who have affinities with Ancient Northeast Asians (ANA) from the Amur River Basin and Mongolian Plateau, as well as Tibetan populations. Other studies suggest that Early Neolithic Shandong hunter-gatherers were distinct from ANA and might even precede ANA groups from coastal Northern China. Populations from coastal Northern China also contributed to the East Asian ancestries of East Asians, Jōmon peoples, East Siberians and Native Americans since the Last Glacial Maximum. According to a 2024 study, Early Neolithic Shandong hunter-gatherers were closely related to Yellow River populations but were slightly shifted towards ANA populations. Other studies likewise show notable genetic input from AR14K-related or Donghulin-related sources in Early Neolithic Shandong hunter-gatherers.

Yangshao-related Yellow River populations show high genetic similarities with the Dahecun and Wenshaobei populations from Henan and Shandong respectively. They are estimated to receive 43.5 ± 5.3% input from groups who show affinities to Yumin. Longshan-related populations show genetic differentiation, with those from Shandong receiving more input from local Shandong hunter-gatherers and Southern East Asians than those from the Central Plains. Successors of Longshan-related Yellow River population show continuity and they've impacted several East Asian groups such as West Liao River populations, Songshan populations and modern Han Chinese.

According to a 2025 study, Middle Neolithic Yellow River groups exhibit distinct substructure. For example, lower Yellow River groups are characterized by Middle Neolithic Yellow River ancestry (24%–73.1%), hunter-gatherer ancestry from Early Neolithic coastal Northern China (23.8%–46.8%), Southern East Asian-related ancestry (7.1%–57.3%; average 32.3%) and ANA-related ancestry (5.2%–16.5%). Meanwhile, upper Yellow River groups are characterized by Middle Neolithic Yellow River ancestry (21%–87.9%), Zongri5.1k-related ancestry (8.3%–55%) and ANA-related ancestry (6.5%–91.7%). Conversely, middle Yellow River groups do not exhibit significant admixture with non-Yellow River groups although admixture with ANA-related groups peak in higher-latitude regions. Zongri5.1k-related ancestry is also found in some local sites from Shaanxi and Shanxi. Some middle Yellow River groups have input from a Southern East Asian-related ancestry called "Yangtzean ancestry", which also constitutes the Southern East Asian ancestry found within lower Yellow River groups. Yangtzean ancestry derives 60% of its ancestry from Southeast China and the rest from Yellow River groups.

Among modern Han subgroups, Han Chinese from Henan, Shandong and Shanxi show the most continuity with post-Late Neolithic Yellow River groups and can even be modeled as their direct descendants. Other Han subgroups have more southern East Asian-related ancestry, especially in Southern China, although studies show that all Han subgroups have matrilineal admixture with minorities in their respective localities. Modern northern Han Chinese are also shown to be closely related to Late Neolithic Yellow River-related populations from Shimao or Neolithic Wuzhuangguoliang-related populations. Siberian and West Eurasian-related ancestry is also detected in some Northern and Central Han Chinese, along with highland Tibetan-related ancestry. Another study states that Central Plains populations show continuity from the Tang dynasty, with no significant admixture with northern Asian steppe ethnic groups, although Tang-era populations received some minimal Central Asian-related input. Post-Tang populations were also directly ancestral to modern Han Chinese from Henan and Shandong. Besides the Han Chinese, populations who are closely related to Neolithic Yellow River farmers include Naxi, Yi, Gelao, indigenous populations from the Himalayan region and western Japanese (i.e. Kansai) people.

=== Archaeogenetic studies in southern China ===
According to Wang et al. (2021), these ancient individuals from Southern China play a key role in the ethnogenesis of present-day Southern Chinese populations and the Austroasiatic and Austronesian diaspora:

- Archaic individuals from 12,000 to 10,000 BP:
  - Qihe-3 (奇和) (11,747–11,356 cal BP; Qihe Cave 奇和洞, Zhangping, Fujian) is an Upper Paleolithic individual from the mountainous interior of Fujian, located about 100 km north of present-day Zhangzhou city. Like other late Homo sapiens, Qihe-3 exhibited a long head, large cranial capacity, high narrow face, broad and low/short nasal shape and exhibits features from northern and southern populations in Neolithic China. They also have large prominent cheekbones, flat upper faces, thin narrow cheeks, larger heads and facial hair. Their features are not necessarily representative of populations living during the Neolithic and Paleolithic transition but rather, reflect the great phenotypic variation that exists. Like the Qihe-2 individual, Qihe-3 clusters closely with Austronesians and are a mixture of Longlin-related and Tianyuan-related ancestries. Alternatively, Qihe individuals can also be described as mixtures of Dushan-related and either Longlin-related or Tianyuan-related ancestries.
  - Qihe-2, a more recent specimen from a different layer of the same site dating to 8,428–8,359 cal BP, was sequenced and found to be closely related to Iron Age Taiwanese and Austronesians like Qihe-3.
  - Longlin (隆林) (10,686–10,439 cal BP; Laomocao Cave 老磨槽洞, Longlin Autonomous County, Guangxi, China) is an Upper Paleolithic individual with deeply diverging East Asian ancestry. Longlin is closely related to the Maludong, or Red Deer Cave people, and Ikawazu (ca. 2,700 BP; Ikawazu Shell Midden site (伊川津貝塚), Atsumi Peninsula, southern Aichi Prefecture, central Honshu, Japan), a Jōmon individual. They are also closely related to Ancient East Asians from Shandong and Fujian than to basal lineages like Hoabinhian before the former split into present Northern East Asians and Southern East Asians. Longlin, Ikawazu and Ancient East Asians likely all diverged from each other at the same time, with Longlin being located at the basal position on the lineage leading to M71d, sharing a maternal genetic connection with present-day populations from mainland Southeast Asia. Although diverged from Ancient East Asians like Jōmon, they were not geographically isolated. Longlin can also be modeled as an admixture of Early Neolithic Xingyi (48.8–71.5%), which is closely related to deeply diverged ghost ancestry found in ancient Tibetans, and Qihe-3-related East Asian ancestry. Despite Longlin's uniquely archaic phenotypes, they carried similar levels of archaic human ancestry as Neolithic and present-day East Asians although it is likely that their phenotypes arose from hybridization with archaic hominins.
  - Liangdao-2 (~7,600 BP; Liangdao, Fujian), was found to have mostly Qihe-3-related ancestry (82%–90%), along with northern East Asian ancestry (10%–18%), associated with Neolithic Shandong and other northern East Asian sites. Liangdao-2 lacks Basal Sunda/Australasian ancestry. Cordillerans, who are the least admixed group among the Austronesians of East Asia, are closely related to Liangdao-2 and diverged from Taiwanese aborigines quite early. They also lack the northern East Asian ancestry that was introduced in Liangdao-2 although it was later introduced in northern Philippines. However, there is evidence that Out-of-Taiwan groups have slightly more northern East Asian ancestry than Into-Taiwan groups, with present Kankanaey groups having ~33% northern East Asian ancestry, similar to what is found in Taiwan Highland/Taiwan Orchid Island groups, who have ~28–37% northern East Asian ancestry. These findings suggest considerable northern East Asian influence in Taiwan prior to the Out-of-Taiwan expansions. A 2025 study showed genetic influence from Neolithic Shandong populations in the 'proto-Austronesian' population from southeastern China. In addition, there is evidence of some Austronesian groups from northern Philippines having low-level European ancestry.
- Archaic individuals from 9,000 to 6,000 BP:
  - Dushan (独山) (8,974–8,593 cal BP; Linfeng Town 林逢镇, Tiandong County, Guangxi) is a male individual that can be modeled as a mixture of Longlin-related ancestry (17%) and Qihe-related ancestry (83%). This suggests a mass migration of ancient Fujian populations into Guangxi, where they intermixed with the indigenous inhabitants rather than completely replacing them. Overall, Dushan has higher affinities with Mán Bạc populations from Late Neolithic Vietnam, Late Neolithic Fujianese populations such as Xitoucun and Tanshishan.
    - Compared to both Qihe individuals, 4,100–2,000 year-old Late Neolithic Fujianese populations like Xitoucun and Tanshishan are closely related to Dushan-related populations. They can be modeled as a mixture of Dushan-related ancestry (34.8%–54.1%), Qihe3-related ancestry (8.2%–17%), northern East Asian-related ancestry (34.4%–44.2%) and deep ancestry represented by Indus Periphery populations (3.4%–3.9%). Taiwan Hanben populations are also closely related to Dushan-related populations. This highlights the significant role of Dushan-related ancestry in prehistoric southern China. The Longli Bouyei and Qiandongnan Dong, who are considered to be the ancestral Kra-Dai population, cluster with the aforementioned populations along with Gongguan populations from Taiwan and Kinh Vietnamese. However, the Hlai are considered to be one of the least admixed Kra-Dai populations since they did not heavily mix with ancient Guangxi populations and Han Chinese and cluster more with Austronesians with divergent ancestry like Ami, Atayal and Kankanaey.
  - Baojianshan (宝剑山) (8,335–6,400 cal BP; Baojianshan Cave site (Baojianshan Cave A), Longzhou County, Chongzuo City, Guangxi) can be modeled as a mixture of 72.3% Dushan-related ancestry and 27.7% Hoabinhian-related ancestry.
- Historical Guangxi populations from 1,500 to 500 BP:
  - Layi can be described as a mixture of Boshan-related ancestry (22%–27%) and either Longlin-related (78%) or Dushan-related (73%) ancestry.
  - Shenxian can be described a mixture of northern East Asian-related ancestry (9%–22%) and southern East Asian-related ancestry (78%–91%).
  - Yiyang can be modeled as a mixture of northern East Asian (18%–42%), and southern East Asian (Liangdao2, 58%–83%) ancestry. However, Yiyang can also be modeled as a mixture of northern East Asian-related ancestry (27%–42%) and Dushan-related ancestry (58%–73%).
  - LaCen can be described as a mixture of northern East Asian ancestry (22%–30%) and Dushan-related ancestry (70%–78%).
  - BaBanQinCen can be described as a mixture of ancestry related to Dushan (5%–64%), northern East Asians (19%–40%) and southern East Asians (5%–72%). They significantly contributed to the genetic makeup of present Kra-Dai groups in Guangxi. Zhuang and Dong from Congjiang County in Guizhou, China also cluster with BaBanQinCen, along with GaoHuaHua. BaBanQinCen also share more alleles with pre-Neolithic Amur River populations (i.e. AR14K), Neolithic to Iron Age Fujianese and prehistoric Guangxi populations.
  - GaoHuaHua can be described as a mixture of northern East Asian ancestry (Boshan, 34%) and Dushan-related ancestry (66%). They significantly contributed to the genetic makeup of Hmong-Mien groups in Guangxi. Zhuang and Dong from Congjiang County in Guizhou, China also cluster with GaoHuaHua, along with BaBanQinCen. Based on their matrilineage, BaBanQinCen and GaoHuaHua populations might've mixed with Shangshihe-related populations from Henan, who originated from the Eastern Zhou period.

=== West Eurasian mtDNA in Han Chinese ===
Genetic studies show that both Northern and Southern Han Chinese have some West Eurasian mtDNA, especially those living in Shaanxi (average of 2–5%), and Liaoning Han Chinese (~2%).

In northwestern Han this minor autosomal west Eurasian is restricted to Gansu, Ningxia and northern Shaanxi (Shaanbei) and Guanzhong in central Shaanxi, but is not found in southern Shaanxi below in the Qinling mountains in Ankang and Hanzhong. In Shaanxi province, Han Chinese from Ankang have the least West Eurasian ancestry. Han Chinese from Shaanxi have West Eurasian mitochondrial DNA Haplogroup U.. According to a 2022 study, West Eurasian ancestry was introduced in Northwestern Han Chinese about 4,500–1,200/1,300 years ago.

Some Han Chinese have mitochondrial DNA M2 in Sichuan, which is South Asian-related.

=== Paternal lineages ===
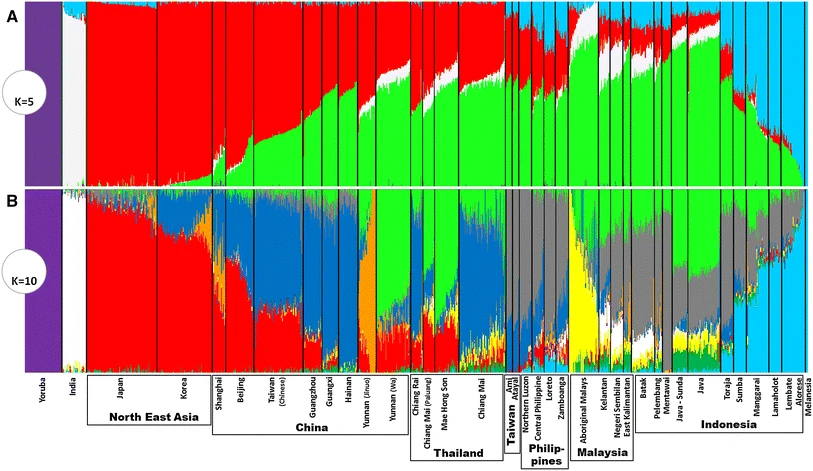
A PCA graph illustrating the genetic makeup of Han Chinese and other Asian populations.

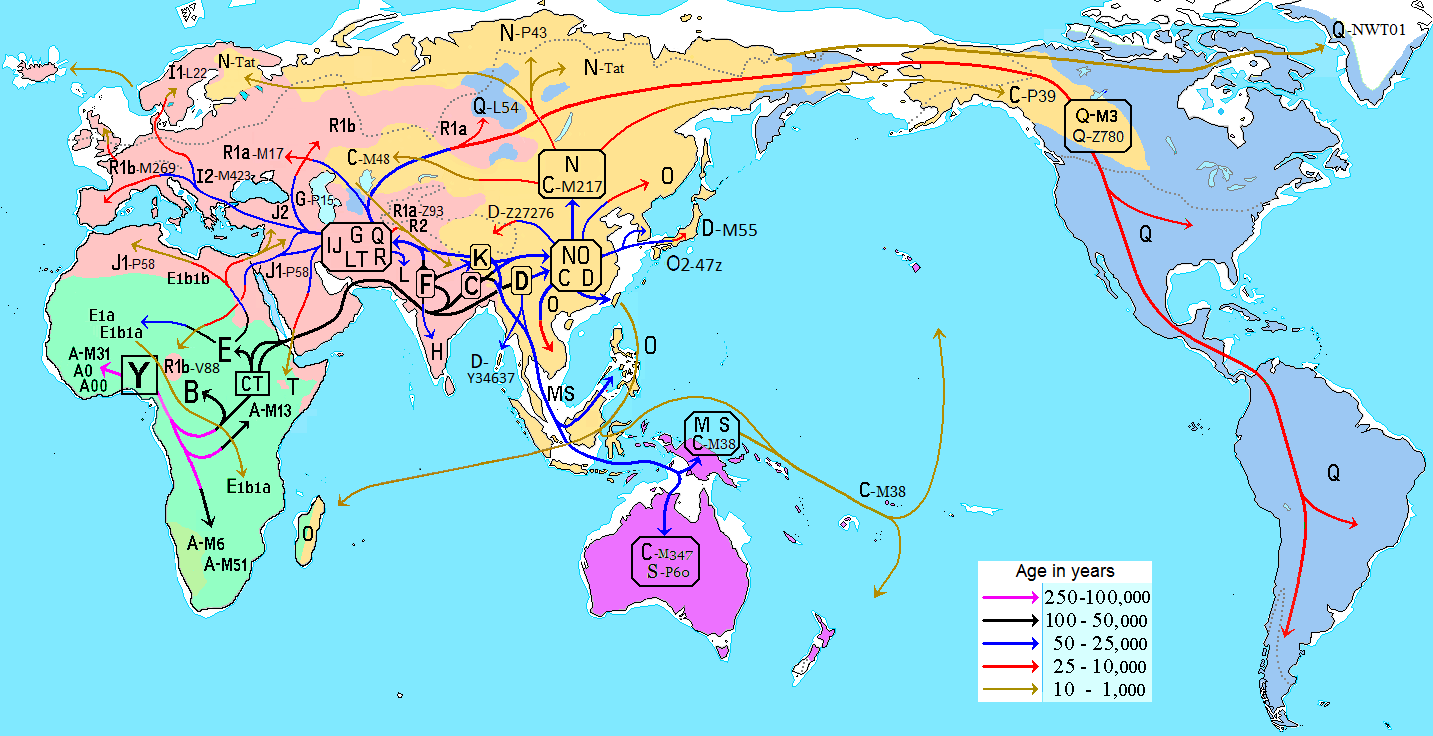
Hypothetical migration patterns of paternal human lineages

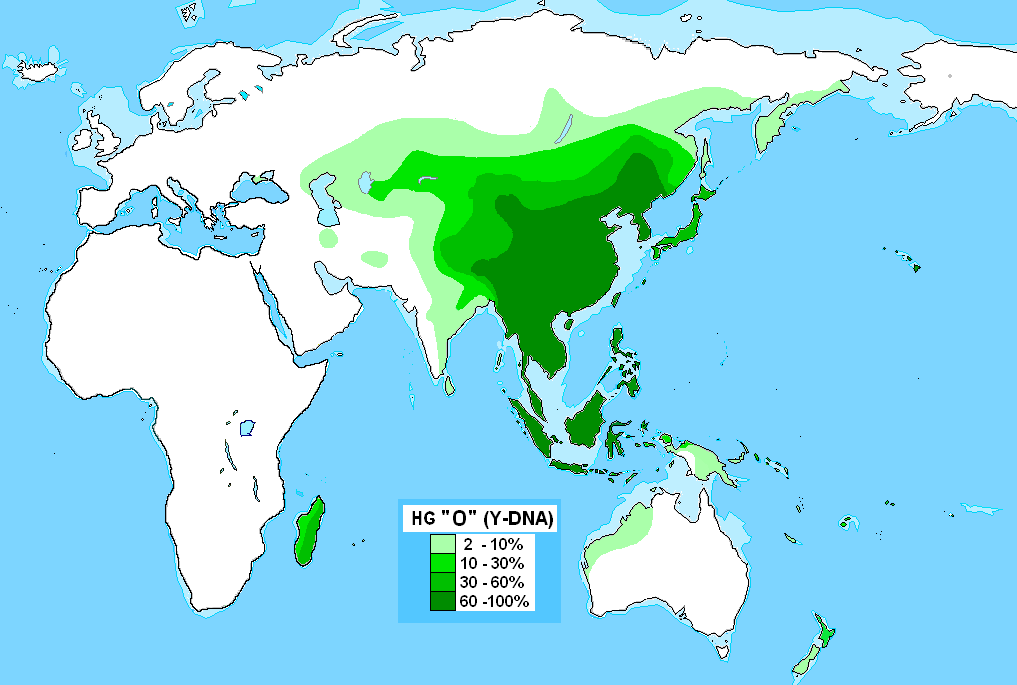
Haplogroup O, also known as O-M175, is primarily found among populations in Southeast Asia and China.

Looking at Y-DNA studies, it would seem that East Asian paternal lineages expanded in Asia approximately 50,000 years ago. People bearing genetic markers ancestral such as C, D, N, and O, as well as P (specifically Q), came through the Himalayan mountain range and proceeded to Southeast Asia. Haplogroup C moved to East Asia and Australia, with at least two subclades of the major East Asian branch migrating into the Americas, and with members of Haplogroup C-M38 spreading throughout Wallacea, New Guinea, Melanesia, and Polynesia. Another group of peoples, bearing the Y-DNA Haplogroup D, has left descendants mostly in the Andaman Islands, Tibet, and Japan. Haplogroup Q, believed to have arisen in Central Asia or Southern Siberia approximately 17,000 to 22,000 years ago, went north to populate Northern Siberia and the Americas. Some northern Chinese have this genetic marker. As part of the southern dispersal along the coastline of Asia, haplogroups N and O went on to populate first Southeast Asia and then from Southeast Asia, left for East Asia. Roughly 12,000 years ago, during the Neolithic period, farmers settled along the Yellow River. Alongside various other lineages including O2-M122, they initiated the development of agriculture. About 6,000 years ago, ancestors of the Tibetans split off from this parent group. About 5,000 years ago, Neolithic Yellow River farmers experienced rapid expansion, with notable gene flow into surrounding populations. This corresponds to the late period (2600–2000 BC) of the Longshan culture in the middle Yellow River area.

Studies of DNA remnants from the Central Plains area of China 3000 years ago show close affinity between that population and those of Northern Han today in both the Y-DNA and mtDNA. Both northern and southern Han show similar Y-DNA genetic structure.

Y-chromosome haplogroup O2-M122 is a common DNA marker in Han Chinese, as it appeared in China in prehistoric times. It is found in more than 50% of Chinese males, with frequencies tending to be high toward the east of the country (30/101 = 29.7% Guangxi Pinghua Han, 13/40 = 32.5% Guangdong Han, 11/30 = 36.7% Lanzhou Han, 26/60 = 43.3% Yunnan Han, 251/565 = 44.4% Zhaotong Han, 15/32 = 46.9% Yili Han, 23/49 = 46.9% Lanzhou Han, 32/65 = 49.2% South China Han, 18/35 = 51.4% Meixian Han, 22/42 = 52.4% Northern Han, 43/82 = 52.4% Northern Han, 18/34 = 52.9% Chengdu Han, 154/280 = 55.0% Southern Han, 27/49 = 55.1% Northern Han, 73/129 = 56.6% North China Han, 49/84 = 58.3% Taiwan Han, 35/60 = 58.3% Taiwan Minnan, 99/167 = 59.3% East China Han, 33/55 = 60.0% Fujian Han, 157/258 = 60.9% Taiwan Han, 13/21 = 61.9% Taiwan Han, 189/305 = 62.0% Zibo Han, 23/35 = 65.7% Harbin Han, 29/44 = 65.9% Northern Han, 23/34 = 67.6% Taiwan Hakka, 35/51 = 68.6% Beijing Han).

During the Zhou dynasty, or earlier, peoples with haplogroup Q-M120 likewise also contributed to the ethnogenesis of Han Chinese people. This haplogroup is implied to be widespread in the Eurasian steppe and north Asia since it is found among Cimmerians in Moldova and Bronze Age natives of Khövsgöl. But it is currently near-absent in these regions except for East Asia. In modern China, haplogroup Q-M120 can be found in the northern and eastern regions.

Han Chinese are genetically distinguishable from Yamato Japanese and Koreans, and internally the different Han Chinese subgroups are genetically closer to each other than any of them are to Koreans and Japanese. However, some Southern Han Chinese, such as Guangxi Han, are genetically closer to Vietnamese and Dai people than Northern Han. But meanwhile, when compared to Europeans genetics, the Han Chinese, Southeast Asian, Japanese and Koreans are closer to each other than Europeans and South Asians. Genealogical research has indicated extremely similar genetic profiles of a less than 1% total variation in spectrum between these three groups. Some Southern Han Chinese and Northern Han Chinese are closest to each other and show the smallest differences when they are compared to other Asians. Vietnamese Ho Chi Minh City Kinh are close to Xishuangbanna's Dai ethnic minority and Guangdong Han Chinese. Koreans are also relatively close to northern Han Chinese. Japanese are more genetically distant from Koreans than Koreans are from northern Han Chinese. However Buryat Mongols and Qinghai Mongols are further from each other than Japanese and Korean despite both being Mongols. Comparisons between the Y chromosome SNP and mtDNA of modern Northern Han Chinese and 3,000 year old Hengbei ancient samples from China's Central Plains show they are extremely similar to each other and show continuity between ancient Chinese of Hengbei and current Northern Han Chinese while Southern Han Chinese were different from the people of Hengbei. This showed that already 3,000 years ago the current northern Han Chinese genetic structure was already formed.

=== Maternal lineages ===
The mitochondrial-DNA haplogroups of the Han Chinese can be classified into the northern East Asian-dominating haplogroups, including A, C, D, G, M8, M9, and Z, and the southern East Asian-dominating haplogroups, including B, F, M7, N*, and R.

These haplogroups account for 52.7% and 33.85% of those in the Northern Han, respectively.

Haplogroup mtDNA D descend from Haplogroup M mtDNA is the modal mtDNA haplogroup among northern East Asians. Among these haplogroups, D, B, F, and A were predominant in the Northern Han, with frequencies of 25.77%, 11.54%, 11.54%, and 8.08%, respectively.

However, in the Southern Han, the northern and southern East Asian-dominating mtDNA haplogroups accounted for 35.62% and 51.91%, respectively. The frequencies of haplogroups D, B, F, and A reached 15.68%, 20.85%, 16.29%, and 5.63%, respectively.

== Climate history ==
During the Last Glacial Maximum, 29,000 to 18,000 years ago, northern China was a treeless steppe with areas of permafrost and southern China lost much of its forest cover. The sea level was much lower. Borneo, Indonesia, the Philippines, and the Japanese archipelago may have been accessible by land. With the end of the last ice age, a period of warming occurred lasting from 18,000 to 10,000 years ago. The oceans rose and inundated vast regions leaving little trace of coastal settlements used by these people. We know little about their languages. Their cultures are likely to have been diverse. There are many limestone cave sites in southern China which show human settlements. There is evidence of pottery making. The inhabitants had bone tools, fished, and hunted pigs and deer.

It is believed that the climate in southern China was warmer and wetter south of the Qinling mountains; elephants are known to have inhabited the Yangtze river region. The climate in Northeast China north of present-day Beijing was characterized as a cold steppe environment during this period. The presence of woolly mammoth is well documented.

The climate was also much warmer between 8,000 and 3,500 years ago. In the Shandong region, excavations have found the bones of alligators and elephants.

The development of agriculture about 10,000 years ago, with the domestication of millet in the Yellow River valley region and rice in the Yangtze River valley, may have been associated with accelerated growth in the number and size of settlements and the intensified development of local cultures and languages.

== Settlements ==
Early settlements in the Chinese Upper Paleolithic were either hunter-gatherer societies, or marine environment-based societies characterized by shell middens. Relatively speaking the land was sparsely populated, as the peoples followed the coastal regions and the river valleys.

Neolithic settlements have been found from the Liaoning province in the northeast to the Chengdu region in the southwest; from Gansu province in the northwest to sites in Fujian in the southeast. The settlement pattern in the Tibetan region is still unclear as there is debate as to whether there was a pre-Neolithic population movement into the region.

As the Neolithic population in China reached its peak, the number of settlements increased. In some locations, such as the basin of the Fen River in southern Shanxi, the Yellow River in western Henan (confined by the Zhongtiao Mountains and Xiao Mountains), and the coastal Rizhao plain of southeast Shandong, a few very large (over 200 ha) centers developed. In more open areas, such as the rest of Shandong, the Central Plain (in Henan) and the Wei River basin in Shaanxi, local centers were more numerous, smaller (generally 20 to 60 ha) and fairly evenly spaced. Walls of rammed earth have been found in 20 towns in Shandong, nine in the Central Plain, and one (Taosi) in southern Shanxi, suggesting conflict between polities in these areas.

The expansion and rise of these various settlements could be due to the impetus of the collective benefit of the construction of irrigation works in the late Neolithic.

The agricultural surplus would have allowed for a rapidly expanding population, which would provide more labor for irrigation. By the time of the establishment of the Xia and Shang dynasties, population estimates were at approximately 13 million people.

== See also ==
- Peopling of Southeast Asia
- List of Paleolithic sites in China
- List of Neolithic sites in China
- List of Bronze Age sites in China
- List of first human settlements
- Genetic history of East Asians § Han Chinese
