= Longsang Zhuang language =

Northern Tai language of Guangxi, China

Longsang Zhuang
- Yang
- Native to: China
- Region: Debao County, Guangxi
- Language family: Kra–Dai: Tai; Northern Tai; Longsang Zhuang

Language codes
- ISO 639-3: None (mis)
- Glottolog: None

Longsang Zhuang (Chinese: 隆桑壮语) is an underdescribed Northern Tai language spoken in Longsang Township 隆桑镇, Debao County, Guangxi, China.

Although its autonym and exonym are both jaːŋ^{A1-G}, it is completely distinct from Yang Zhuang, a Central Tai language (Liao 2016:377).

== Distribution ==
Within Longsang Township 隆桑镇, Debao County, Guangxi, China, Longsang Zhuang is spoken in the following villages (Liao 2016:377-382).

- Sanhe (三合屯; faːk33 kaw31 in Zhuang), Qiaotou Village (桥头村)
- Qiaonan (桥南屯 tɕaw^{C1} kɔːŋ^{C1} in Zhuang) village, Qiaotou Village (桥头村)
- Daji Village (大吉村)
- Longtan (龙坛屯; luŋ31 taːn55 in Zhuang), Longtan Village (龙坛村)
- Longyuan (龙苑屯), Longtan Village (龙坛村)

== Sources ==
- Liao Hanbo. 2016. Tonal development of Tai languages. M.A. dissertation. Chiang Mai: Payap University.
