= Saek language =

Tai language of Laos and Thailand

Saek
- แถร̄ก
- Native to: Laos, Thailand
- Native speakers: 10,000 (2007–2015)
- Language family: Kra–Dai: Tai; Northern Tai; Saek
- Writing system: Thai script

Language codes
- ISO 639-3: skb
- Glottolog: saek1240
- ELP: Saek
- Saek is classified as Severely Endangered by the UNESCO Atlas of the World's Languages in Danger.

Saek (Sek; Thai: ภาษาแสก) is a Tai language spoken in at least ten villages in Khammouane Province, Laos, and at least four villages in Nakhon Phanom Province in northeastern Thailand, just across the Mekong River. It is spoken by the Saek people.

== Grammar ==
A grammar of Saek (as spoken in Laos) was written by Weijian Meng in 2023.

== Phonology ==
The Saek tones are (Hudak & Gedney 2010):

- 1 = /˧˦/ (/34/) mid level, slight rise at the end
- 2 = /˩/ (/11/) low level
- 3 = /˧˩ˀ/ (/31ˀ/) falling to low, with glottal constriction
- 4 = /˦˥˦/ (/454/) high peaking
- 5 = /˥˨/ (/52/) high falling
- 6 = /˧˨ˀ/ (/32ˀ/) mid level, with slight fall and glottal constriction

Saek tonal splits are as follows (See Proto-Tai language#Tones for clarification.).

Gedney Diagram: Saek Tones
	*A	*B	*C	*DS	*DL
Aspirated	2, 1	6	3	4	6
Unaspirated	1	6	3	4	6
Glottalized	1	6	3	4	6
Voiced	4	5	6	6	5

== Locations ==
Saek is spoken in the following locations (Hudak & Gedney 2010:251-252).

=== Thailand ===
Two Saek villages are "Ban Asamat" and "Ban Phai Lom," located just off the main river road a few kilometers north of Nakhon Phanom city. Another is Ban Ba Wa Saek, located further upriver, but inland a few kilometers. However, except for the older generation, the Saek language is all but disappearing as there is a strong tendency for younger generations to use the local trade language Lao/Isan, and/or the official Central Thai language as they are assimilated into mainstream Thai society.

William Gedney lists the following Saek villages in Nakhon Phanom Province, Thailand.

1. baan3 ʔaat6 saa1 maat5 อาจสามารถ (known locally as baan3 khɔɔŋ2). 5 km north of the city of Nakhon Phanom. This is the variant recorded by William Gedney in his Saek language: glossary, texts, and translations. Variant pronunciations: ʔeek6 ʔaa1 saa1 (old name; archaic), ʔa4 sa6 maat5, ʔa6 saa1, ʔaa1 saa1, ʔaa1 sa6 maat5, ʔaa1 saa1 maat5, ʔaat6 sa6 maat5.
2. baan3 phay6 lɔɔm3, one mile inland from baan3 ʔaat6 saa1 maat5. Variant name: baan3 saw1 law3.
3. baan3 dɔŋ1 sa6 mɔɔ4 in Si Songkhram District (sii1 soŋ1 khraam4). Variant pronunciations: dɔɔn1 suʔ6 mɔɔ4, doŋ1 su6 mɔɔ4, doŋ1 sa6 mɔɔ4.
4. baan3 baa6 vaa3 in kiŋ6 naa4 vaa3 district. Variant pronunciation: baa1 vaa3.

According to Gedney, abandoned Saek villages in Thailand include:

1. baan3 thaa5 vaay4, between baan3 ʔaat6 saa1 maat5 and the city of Nakhon Phanom.
2. baan3 naa4 laʔ6 vaay4, on the road to Sakon Nakhon.

=== Laos ===
According to Gedney's texts and notebooks, Saek is spoken in the following locations in Laos.

1. baan3 thaa5 khɛɛ4
2. baan3 thɔɔk5
3. baan3 phoo4 kham3
4. baan3 phaa5 thuŋ1 - completely occupied by Saek
5. baan3 phoon3 ŋaam1 - half Lao, half Saek village

Chamberlain (1998) cites the following Saek-speaking villages in Laos. District codes are also given in parentheses (see districts of Laos).

- Khamkeut District, Borikhamxay Province (11-05)
  - Ban Na Kadok, Nam Veo Subdistrict (originally from Phu Quan village, near Đức Thọ, Hà Tĩnh Province, Vietnam). They have extensive gold mines along the Nam Houay stream bed. Settlers from Na Kadok had also founded Na Vang in Nakai District, located on the Nam Mone, when they were hiding from Thai soldiers during the Siamese occupation of Laos. The Bru people now live in Na Vang and maintain the terraces that the Saek had originally built.
  - Ban Som Sanouk, Lak Xao Subdistrict
  - Ban Nam Phao, Lak Xao Subdistrict
  - Ban Houay Toun, Lak Xao Subdistrict
  - Ban Na Tham Kwang (or Ban Nam Hoy), Khammmouane Subdistrict
- Nakai District, Khammouane Province (12-07)
  - Ban Toeng (subdistrict seat on the Nam Noy)
  - Ban Na Meo (located on the Nam Pheo, a tributary of the Nam Noy; village claimed to have been occupied for 286 years)
  - Ban Na Moey (located on the Nam Pheo)
  - Ban Beuk (located on the Nam Pheo)
- Gnommarath District, Khammouane Province (12-05)
  - Ban Pha Toung (residents originally from Ban Toeng)
  - Ban Khène (residents originally from Ban Toeng)
- Thakhek District, Khammouane Province (12-01): various villages
- Hinboun District, Khammouane Province (12-04): various villages

Morev notes that Saek is also spoken in the following districts of Khammouane Province, Laos.

- Nhommarat District (12-05)
- Mahaxay District (12-02)
- Kham Khet District (in Borikhamxay) (11-05)
- Tha Khek District (12-01)

The Saek speakers of Laos live adjacent to Bru and Mène speakers (Chamberlain 1998).

Additional data on Saek of Laos has since been collected by Jean Pacquement (2016, 2017, 2018).

=== Vietnam ===
According to Gedney, Vietnam is said to have the two following Saek villages. However, Chamberlain (1998) notes that all villages listed by Gedney to be in Vietnam are actually in Laos.

1. baan3 trɤɤŋ3 (actually in Laos according to Chamberlain (1998))
2. baan3 tɛɛn1

According to Gedney, abandoned Saek villages in Vietnam (Laos according to Chamberlain) include the following. Their equivalents in Chamberlain (1998) are given in parentheses.

1. baan3 bɯk4 naa4 tɤɤ3 (Ban Beuk)
2. baan3 sin4 naa4 mɤɤy4 (Ban Na Moey)
3. baan3 trɤɤŋ1 (Ban Toeng - subdistrict seat on the Nam Noy)
4. baan3 thruu3 (Ban Thô - next to the Houay Thô and Nam Amang confluence; just north of the mountain "Phu Kun Tho")
5. The phiaŋ4 sɤɤŋ1

=== China ===
There are perhaps some Saek speakers in China, where they are classified as Zhuang people.

== Sources ==
- Chamberlain, James R. 1998. "The Origin of the Sek: Implications for Tai and Vietnamese History". Journal of the Siam Society 86.1 & 86.2: 27–48.
- Gedney, W. J. (1993). William J. Gedney's the Saek language: glossary, texts, and translations. Michigan papers on South and Southeast Asia, no. 41. [ ]: Center for South and Southeast Asian Studies, University of Michigan. ISBN 0-89148-073-0
- Hudak, Thomas J., and William J. Gedney. 2010. William J. Gedney's concise Saek-English, English-Saek lexicon. Oceanic Linguistics special publication, no. 37. Honolulu: University of Hawai'i Press.
- Miyake, Marc. 2013. Saek.
- Morev, L. N. 1988. Yazik Sek [The Saek Language]. Moscow: Nauka.
