= Saek people =

Ethnic group of Laos and Thailand

Saek
Total population
- 10,000 (2007)

Regions with significant populations
- Thailand

Languages
- Saek, Lao, Thai

Religion
- Animism, Theravada Buddhism

The Saek (also known as Set, in Thai: แสก, RTGS: saek and IPA: [sɛːk]; Lao: xaeh) or Tai Saek are a small ethnic group of Laos and Thailand. The Saek are a part of the larger Tai ethnicity.

== History ==
A study by the Lao government on the country's ethnic minorities reports that the Saek arrived in Laos in the 17th century, having migrated from Vietnam and China. In particular, members of the village of Na Kadok claim to originate from Hà Tĩnh province, located across the Vietnamese border from Na Kadok. Specialised in finding gold in mines, it has been hypothesised that the southward migration occurred in search of new gold deposits. Saek in Thailand live in Nakhon Phanom province, in Northeastern Thailand, near the villages of the Saek settled in Laos, which are located close to the Laotian bank of the Mekong.

== Geographic distribution ==
The center of the Saek population is the Mekong River in central Laos. A smaller Saek community makes its home in the Isan region of northeast Thailand, near the border with Laos.

There were 14,000 Saek people in 1990 in Laos, where they live in the central part of the country and are divided into small groups. Some are settled in the mountainous areas of Nam Noy and Nam Pheo, in the districts of Hinboune, Nakai and Ngolamath of Khammouane province, while others live near the provincial capital Thakhek. A final group lives about one hundred kilometres further north, in the village of Na Kadok, located in the south-eastern part of Khamkheut District, in the mountainous area near the Vietnamese border of Bolikhamsai province.

Across the Mekong, there were 11,000 Saek people in 1993 in the area of Nakhon Phanom, capital of the province of the same name (Nakhon Phanom province), in Northeast Thailand.

== Culture ==
Most Saek cultural practices were either absorbed from the surrounding Lao and Thai cultures, or were practices common to the greater Tai ethnicity. However, the Saek are known for their round dances.

The Saek who have moved to the urban areas of Thakhek and Nakhon Phanom differ greatly from those who have remained in the mountain villages. While the former have integrated into the urban lifestyles of Lao and Thai society, the latter live in villages accessible only on foot and inhabit houses built on stilts about two metres above the ground. Walls and floors are made of wood and the roof is thatched. The houses are spacious and have several rooms.

Society is matriarchal and girls are usually free to choose their husbands. After marriage, couples go to live in the house of the groom's parents. The Saek also marry members of other Tai ethnic groups. At funerals in the mountain villages, the deceased is placed in a coffin and taken to the cemetery, where the body is cremated. On such occasions one or two buffaloes are sacrificed. The deceased is buried without cremation if the person is a child or a victim of an accident. Traditional costumes have largely fallen into disuse and the Saek now wear ordinary clothing purchased in nearby markets.

=== Language ===
The language of the Saek people is also called Saek, and it is part of the northern Tai branch of the Tai–Kadai language family. However, the Saek language is not mutually intelligible with Thai or Lao. In addition to speaking the various dialects of their own language, the Saek also speak Lao in Laos and Thai in Thailand, which are taught in schools. With the progressive expansion of schooling, by the end of the 20th century fewer and fewer young people were able to speak Saek.

The dialect spoken in Na Kadok differs slightly from the others spoken by the Saek, and all are related to the language of the neighbouring Tai Mène ethnic group, spoken by about 7,200 people in 1995. Despite this affinity, the Tai Mène language has been classified within the larger group of Tai languages, whereas the Saek language forms a group of its own; both belong to the Tai–Saek languages, a subgroup of the Northern Tai languages.

Many Saek have also adopted Lao.

=== Religion ===
Most of the Saek in Laos adhere to their animist traditional beliefs, which include ancestor worship, with a small number adhering to Theravada Buddhism.

Offerings are often made to spirits to prevent illness. Spirits often represent the forces of nature, and each Saek village typically has a guardian spirit. In the villages there are shamans called moiyau, who prepare medicinal remedies and organise religious ceremonies. The population worships or fears various spirits, including those that protect the house and the village, as well as those of the river, the forest and the sky.

== Economy ==
Saek people generally practise subsistence agriculture. In the lowland areas they mainly cultivate glutinous rice, while in the mountains they grow rice more suitable for dry land, making extensive use of slash-and-burn cultivation. Other crops include maize, potatoes and other vegetables. They raise buffaloes, other cattle and poultry both for food and for sale. They also raise and eat dogs. Hunting and gathering in the forests near the villages is still practised. Among the few handicraft activities is the production of baskets and mats woven from bamboo.
