= Yongbei Zhuang =

Zhuang variety of China

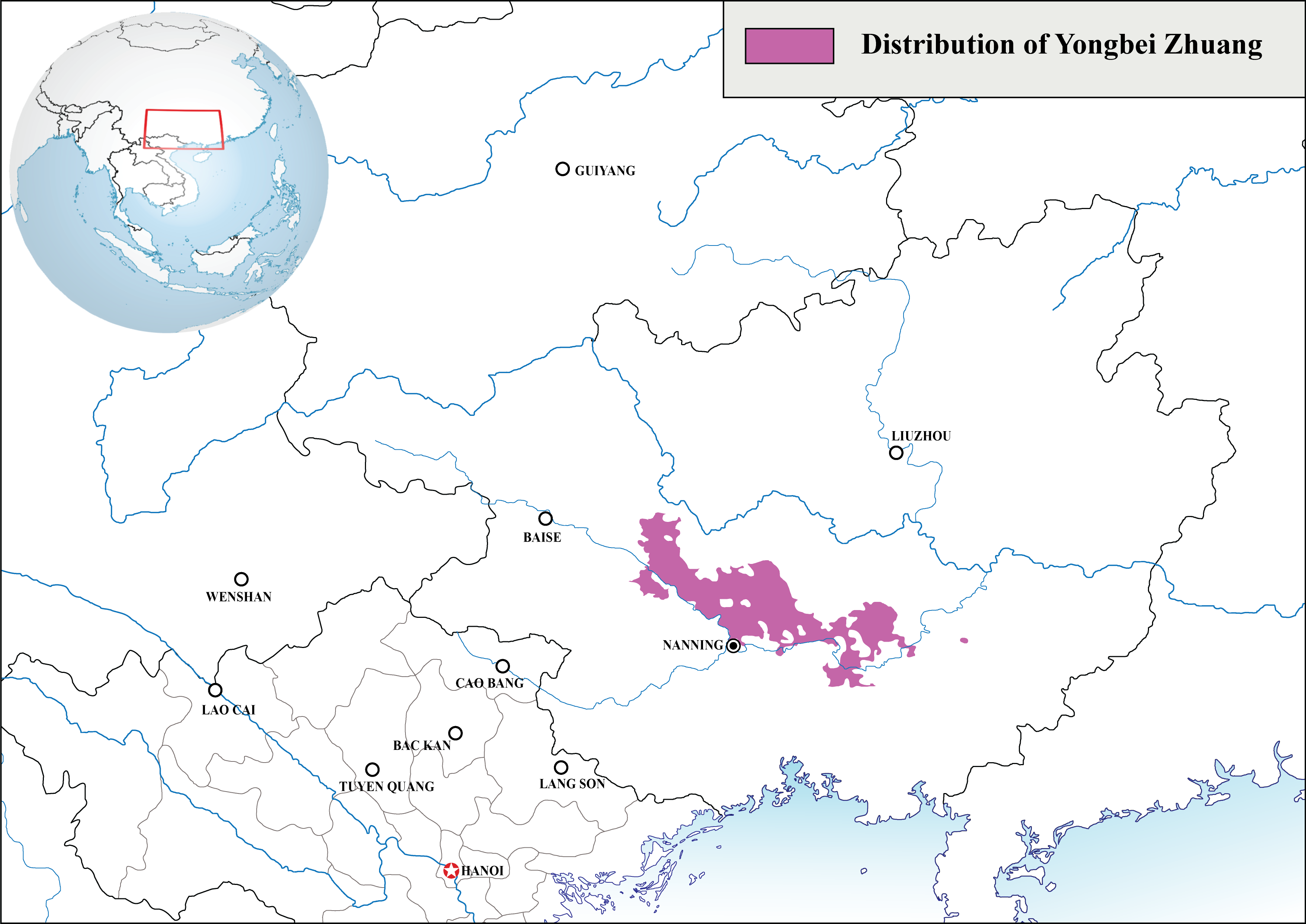
- Geographic distribution of Yongbei Zhuang
- Native to: China
- Native speakers: 2.0 million, including Wuming (2007)
- Language family: Kra–Dai: Tai; Northern Tai (Northern Zhuang); Yongbei Zhuang

Language codes
- ISO 639-3: zyb
- Glottolog: yong1276

Yongbei Zhuang is a Zhuang variety including the dialects of Yongning North, Binyang, Hengxian, and Pingguo dialects. 'Yongbei' 邕北 is Chinese and here means North of the Yongjiang river; in other contexts it can stand for the north of Yongning County, or Yongning North.

As an areal group Yongbei includes Wuming dialect, the basis of Standard Zhuang. However, Wuming falls in the Yongnan-Wuming Zhuang comparative group.
