= Yommalath district =

Yommalath district ເມືອງຍົມມະລາດ
- District
- Coordinates: 17°36′N 105°12′E
- Country: Laos
- Province: Khammouane
- Time zone: UTC+7 (ICT)

Yommalath or Nhommalath is a district (muang) of Khammouane province in mid-Laos. The district was damaged by floods caused by heavy rain in July 2011, affecting rice farmland in the district, inundating almost 700 hectares, destroying dozens of fishponds and killing 112 cattle.

== Towns and villages ==
- Ban Kenglek
