= San Chay people =

San Chay
Người Sán Chay
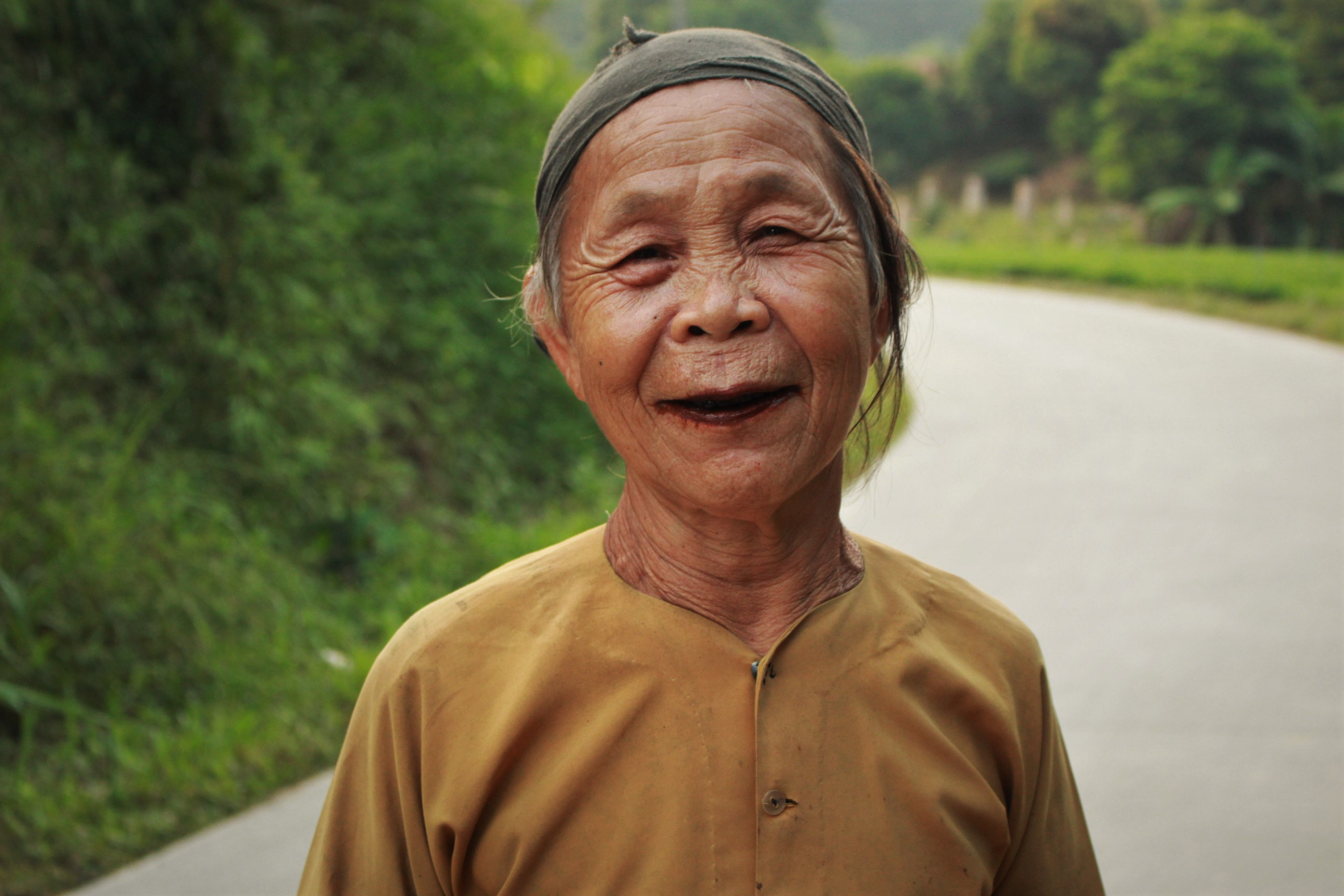

Total population
- 252.000 (2019)

Regions with significant populations
- Vietnam: 201.398 @2019 (Northern Vietnam, Central Highlands and Tuyên Quang)

Languages
- Cao Lan, Pinghua Chinese, Vietnamese

Religion
- Buddhism

Related ethnic groups
- Zhuang, Buyei

The San Chay people (Vietnamese: Người Sán Chay; also called Sán Chỉ) live in Tuyên Quang Province of the Northeast region of Vietnam, as well as some nearby provinces. The Pinghua language is a form of Chinese language. Their population was 201,398 in 2019.

Many live in remote areas, using slash-and-burn agriculture because those areas are not flat enough for paddy rice production.

They sing sình cồ (love songs) and celebrate the Slếch thlin mảy festival (New Rice festival).

The San Chay people are related with the Shanzi People in Guangxi, China.
