= Yoy language =

Language

Yoy
- Native to: Thailand, Laos
- Native speakers: (6,000 cited 1990–1995)
- Language family: Kra–Dai: Tai; Northern?; Yoy

Language codes
- ISO 639-3: yoy
- Glottolog: yoyy1238

Yoy is a Tai language of Thailand and Laos. The Yoy language is now in the critical endangered state due to a rapid language shift, which may eventually lead to complete language loss.

== Phonology ==
The phonology of Yoy, according to Phakkahn (2017).

=== Consonants ===
		Bilabial	Alveolar	Palatal	Velar	Glottal
Nasal		m	n	ɲ	ŋ	
Stop	Voiceless	p	t		k	ʔ
Stop	Aspirated	pʰ	tʰ		kʰ	ʔ
Stop	Voiced	b	d			ʔ
Affricate				tɕ		
Fricative			s			h
Approximant		w	l	j		

Only /p t k ʔ m n ŋ j w/ occur in word-final position. Yoy also has six initial consonant clusters which are /tw-/, /kw-/, /kʰw-/, /sw-/, /hw-/, and /bw-/.

Some words show alternate pronunciations between the initial syllable consonants:

/jaːk⁵/ ~ /ɲaːk⁵/ to want
/jaːw²/ ~ /ɲaːw²/ long
/joːj⁴/ ~ /ɲoːj⁴/ Yoy

=== Vowels ===
		Front	Central	Back	
		Front	Central	unr.	rnd.
Diphthongs		ia	aɯ	ɯa	ua
Monophthongs	Close	i, iː		ɯ, ɯː	u, uː
Monophthongs	Close-mid	e, eː		ɤ, ɤː	o, oː
Monophthongs	Open-mid	æ, æː			ɔ, ɔː
Monophthongs	Open		a, aː		

Yoy has two different phonemic vowel lengths. There are nine short vowels and nine long vowels. In the word-final open syllables, there is no contrast between short and long vowels, but in closed syllables and non-final open syllables, short and long vowels are distinctive.

=== Tones ===
Yoy has five phonologically distinctive tones in non-checked syllables. Checked syllables in Yoy can carry only tone 1 (mid-leveled tone), tone 2 (high-rising tone), and tone 5 (low-falling creaky).

== Vocabulary ==
=== Numerals ===
English	Yoy
one	nɯŋ¹
two	sɔːŋ³
three	saːm³
four	siː⁵
five	haː⁵
six	hok²
seven	tɕet²
eight	pæːt⁵
nine	kaw¹
ten	sip²
hundred	hoːj⁴
thousand	pʰan²

=== Verbs ===
English	Yoy
to go	paj³
to open	pɤːt⁵
to dream	pʰan³
to fall	tok²
to wash (clothes)	top²
to die	taj³
to wait	tʰaː⁵
to bite	kat²
to ask	tʰaːm³
to think	kʰɯt⁴
to throw	kʰwæŋ⁵
to smell	dom³
to burn	ʔuːt⁵
to sit	mep⁵
to like	mak⁵
to smile	ɲiːm⁴
to want	ɲaːk⁵
to eat	kin²
to do	het¹
to teach	sɔːn³
to run	læn⁴
to play	lin⁵

=== Nouns ===
English	Yoy
eye	taː³
sun	ta¹ wen²
sky	tʰɔŋ⁴ pʰaː⁵
milk	tu²
skin	kʰiːŋ²
fire	pʰaj²
mountain	pʰu¹ kʰaw³
fish	paː³
wood	pæn⁴
tree	kok¹ maj¹
tooth	kʰæːw⁵
leg	kʰaː³
chin	kʰaːŋ²
egg	kʰaj²
people	kʰon²
rice	kʰaːw⁵
leaf	baɯʔ³
soil	din³
water	naːm⁴
cloud	mek¹
dog	maː³
bird	nok⁵
blood	lɯat¹

=== Adjectives ===
English	Yoy
far	kaj³
near, short (distance)	kaɯ⁴
old	kaw¹
new	maj⁵
good	diː³
fat	pʰiː²
beautiful	tɕop²
red	dæŋ³
black	dam³
white	kʰaːw⁵
soft	ʔon⁵
stupid	pɯk²
wet	ʔɯn³
dry	hæŋ⁵
big	ɲaɯ²
few	noj⁵
