= Ugong people =

Ugong
Total population
- ~500

Regions with significant populations
- Thailand

Languages
- Thai, Ugong

Religion
- Theravada Buddhism

The Ugong are an ethnic group in Thailand. There are approximately 500 Ugong in the Suphan Buri Province of Thailand. The Ugong are Theravada Buddhists.
