= Hlai people =

Kra-Dai-speaking ethnic group on Hainan Island

Hlai, Li
黎族
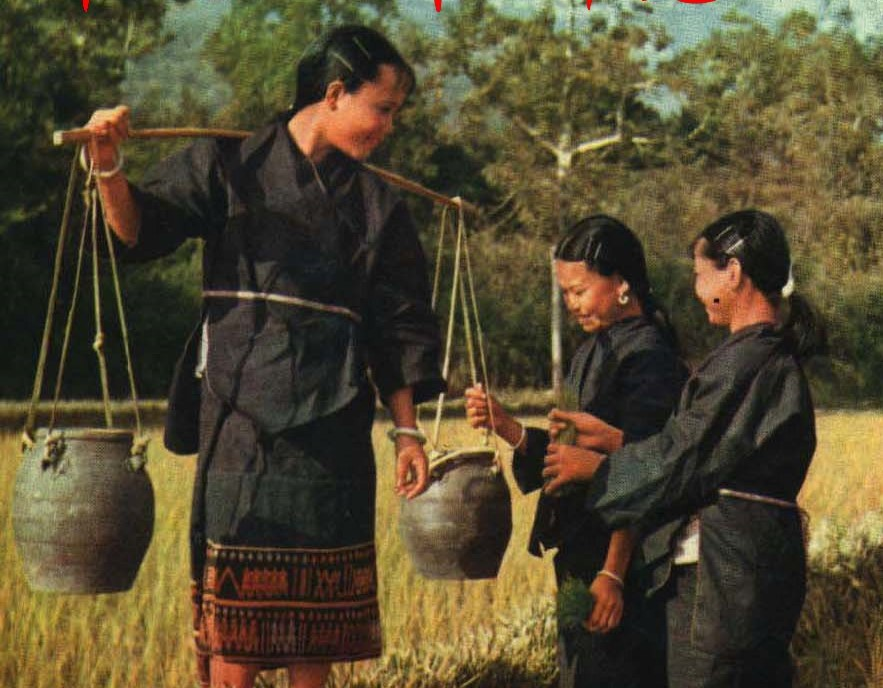

Total population
- 1,602,104 (2020)

Regions with significant populations
- predominantly in Hainan (Baisha, Changjiang, Ledong, Lingshui, Baoting, Qiongzhong,...), with minorities in Guangdong

Languages
- Hlai languages, Jiamao, Hainanese and Mandarin

Religion
- Animism, Theravada Buddhism

Related ethnic groups
- Other Tai–Kadai peoples and populations from Mainland Southern China, Utsuls

Hlai people
- Chinese: 黎
- Literal meaning: [phonetic]
Transcriptions
Standard Mandarin
- Hanyu Pinyin: Lí
- Wade–Giles: Li

Alternative Chinese name
- Chinese: 黎族
- Literal meaning: Li Ethnicity
Transcriptions
Standard Mandarin
- Hanyu Pinyin: Lízú
- Wade–Giles: Li-tsu

The Hlai, also known as Li or Lizu, are a Kra–Dai-speaking ethnic group, one of the 56 ethnic groups officially recognized by the People's Republic of China. The vast majority live off the southern coast of China on Hainan Island, where they are the largest minority ethnic group. Divided into the five branches of the Qi (Gei), Ha, Run (Zwn), Sai (Tai, Jiamao) and Meifu (Moifau), the Hlai have their own distinctive culture and customs.

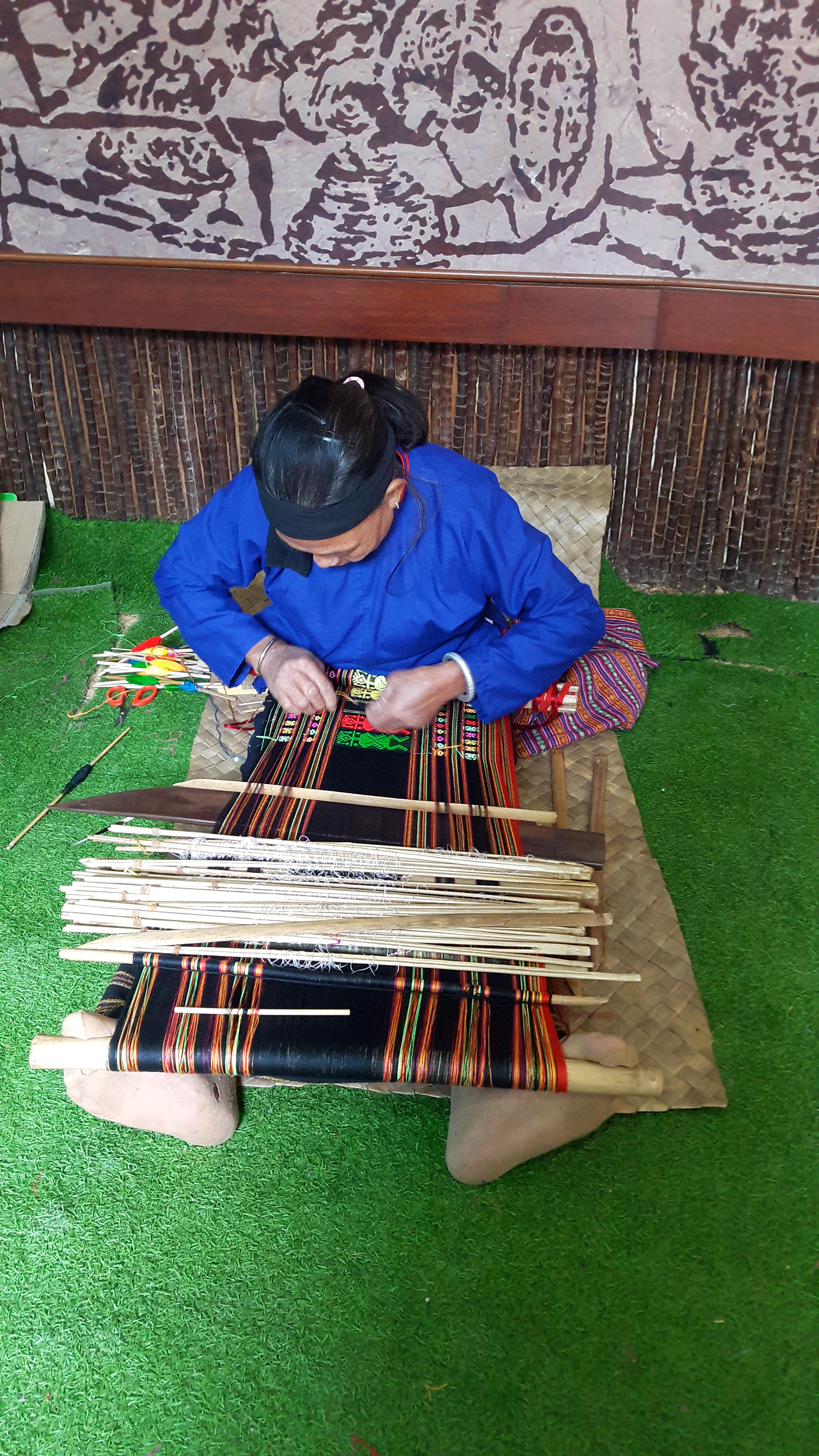
Traditional weaving methods of the Hlai on Hainan Island, China. The worker uses her feet to stretch the handloom.

== Names ==
黎 (Lí), which was pronounced *lei in Middle Chinese is the Chinese transcription of their native name, which is Hlai. They are sometimes also known as the "Sai" or "Say". During China's Sui Dynasty, their ancestors were known by various names, including Liliao (俚僚), a general term encompassing several non-Chinese ethnic groups in Southern China. The name Li first is recorded during the Later Tang period (923–937 CE).

== History ==
Liang and Zhang (1996:18–21) believe that the original homeland of the Hlai languages was the Leizhou Peninsula, and estimate that the Hlai had migrated across the Hainan Strait to Hainan island about 4,000 years before present. According to Schafer, the Li people were originally spread out across the continental coastline, covering Northern Vietnam and the area west of Guangzhou, including Hainan. Their names were converted into the Chinese clan name Li. The earliest mention of the term Li as an ethnonym was in the Han dynasty, referring to people of the highlands of Central Vietnam at Jiuzhen (Cửu Chân). After the Han dynasty these people were primarily located in Guangxi and western Guangdong.

The 3rd century Nanzhou Yiwuzhi mentioned bandits called Lǐ (俚) who lived south of Guangzhou in the five commanderies: Cangwu, Yulin, Hepu, Ningpu and Gaoliang. They lived in villages with no walls and took refuge in the mountains and narrow passes. They did not have commanders or lords. The Liu Song dynasty (420–479) set up a post called "Protector the Western Rivers" specifically to attack the Li and Lao people. After 471, the holder of that post encroached on the territory of the Li and Lao people. An army under the command of Li Sidao, the governor of Jinkang (close to modern Wuzhou), attacked the Li under the Protector's orders. During the 6th century, the Li people were united under the rule of Lady Xian, a hereditary leader who convinced tribal leaders to obey her. In the early 6th century, the Liang dynasty (502–557) waged war on the Li people, calling it the "pacification of the Li dong". In 503, governor Xun Fei of the Yulin Commandery (east central Guangxi) was killed in battle while fighting the Li. Between 523 and 545, there was open warfare with the Li and a Li commander named Chen Wenche was defeated. In the Tang dynasty, the Li people of northern Vietnam were assigned a separate administrative status among the populace of the Annan protectorate, only paying half the taxes of ordinary subjects. By the 11th century, records no longer mention the Li on the mainland.

State administration of Hainan's lowlands was indirect until the Song dynasty and state control of the inland mountains was indirect until the 1950s. By the 11th century, Chinese records state that Hlai people were living close to Chinese settlements and paid taxes to the central state. However by the end of the Ming dynasty in the mid-17th century, virtually all areas of Hainan capable of intense cultivation had been settled by Han Chinese, while the Hlai filled the niche of supplying mountain products. By 1700, the Qing dynasty had re-established administration over Hainan. Migrant merchants started entering Hainan and threatened the economic niche of the Hlai, who broke out in violent protest against these "guest merchants" in 1766.

The shu Li live in the foothills of the Five-Fingers mountains, and although their nature differs from that of Han people, still they plow and plant and pay taxes and perform corvée service. They have been marinated in Han culture for a very long time. Therefore there are many Li people in every area who have shaved their heads and want to become regular citizens [qimin]. But it has not been made a clear order, and there are many shu Li who have not shaved their heads. There is really no uniformity. We should order the Li leaders to clearly order all shu Li to shave their heads ... by requiring them universally and gradually to comply, we will make shaven heads the prevailing custom, and they will not be able to pretend to be sheng Li and cause trouble. It will gradually and imperceptibly rid them of their violent tendencies and habits.

— Yang Tingzhang

In 1751, He Xiang wrote an essay titled "Arguments against Settling the Li and Establishing Counties." In it he explained that Hainan was dangerous not because the Hlai people were fierce, but because of malaria and poisonous animals. He mocked previous campaigns against the Hlai for conquering hamlets of no value or significance while several thousand troops died of malaria. The highlands inhabited by the Hlai were also not economically valuable, and therefore had not yet been transformed. While many Chinese generals had made a name for themselves by "settling Guangdong", they all left the Hlai alone.

While its indigenous inhabitants, known in Chinese as the Li people, have frequently clashed with Han Chinese on the island, Hainan has never produced a noteworthy political or military movement that sought independence from China. There has never been a question as to Hainan's allegiance and belonging. This sets Hainan apart from other troublesome border regions of China, including Tibet, Xinjiang, Manchuria, Mongolia, and Taiwan.

— Jeremy A. Murray

During the Japanese occupation of Hainan (1939–1945), the Hlai suffered extremely heavily due to their communist resistance activities especially in western Hainan. Hlai villages were frequently targeted for extermination and rape by Japanese soldiers. In four towns alone, the Japanese slaughtered more than 10,000 Hlai people.

Because the Hlai sided with the CCP during the Chinese Civil War against the Nationalists, the Hlai are looked upon favorably by the government of the People's Republic of China.

== Language ==
The Hlai speak the Hlai languages, a member of the Kra–Dai language family, but most can understand or speak Hainanese and Standard Chinese. The Jiamao language spoken natively by the Sai (also known as Tai or Jiamao) subgroup has been noted for its dissimilarity to the dialects or languages spoken by the other subgroups of the Hlai.

A Qing dynasty report on the Hlai dated 1756 claimed that they did not have a writing system.

== Culture ==
Women were able to become political leaders in Hlai society. In 1171, a Hlai woman by the name of Wang Erniang was bestowed the title of "Lady of Suitability" by the Song court and given the post of commander-general over 36 ethnic groups in the south. She was the headwoman of the Hlai people and had a husband but nobody knew his name. She was very wealthy and adept at keeping order over her people. The Song dynasty communicated with non-Chinese southerners by relaying their orders through her. In 1181, her daughter inherited her position, and in 1216, another daughter inherited the position.

Among the Hlai, the women have a custom of tattooing their arms and backs after a certain age is reached. The Hlai play a traditional wind instrument called kǒuxiāo (口箫).

The land of the sheng Li is not governed by officials [bushu guan], but they all have leaders. Among them are some who receive pawned goods, and they use a piece of bamboo as a receipt. The Li have no writing, and the bamboo they use is split into three parts, and upon it is carved the price and amount of “hill” land. The two parties and a mediator each carry off one part as proof of the transaction. There is not one who dares to cheat. Lately, however, dishonest, sneaky people frequently make counterfeits, which starts fights. . . . The Li people do not store grain. After the harvest they tie up the grain and save it and hang it over their stoves using the stove’s smoke to cure it, and eat it after a certain number of days. . . . They see this as very convenient. Among the Li there are no markets, and there have never been sellers of grain there. Poor people who lack food borrow from those who have rice. They do not calculate interest. Whether they pay back or not is also not a weighty matter. Lately there are many dishonest, greedy people who lend in the spring and expect repayment in the fall. They get profits from very high interest; their hearts do not follow the ways of the ancients!

— Zhang Qingchang

== Religion ==
The Hlai were primarily animists. According to Hlai legends, their clans each originated from the marriage of a woman and an animal. The most prominent animal is the snake. Leigong, the God of Thunder, laid a snake on Li Mountain. From the egg hatched a woman named Limu (literally "mother of the Li") who lived off of wild fruits and nested in the trees. Eventually she married and their descendants became the Hlai people. Another version says that the woman arrived on a ship and married a dog, giving birth to the Hlai. The Hlai also worshiped other animals such as the ox, which was represented in each house by a stone that they called the "soul of the ox." The "Oxen's Festival" was celebrated on the eighth day of the third lunar month every year. On that day the oxen were forbidden to be killed or worked. They stayed at home and were fed liquor believed to protect the ox and guarantee plentiful harvest. The "najiaxila" bird of legend was worshiped as a protector god for taking care of an ancestor woman of the Hlai. Dragons and cats were worshiped as well since they are considered to be ancestors.

== Genetics ==
The Hlai are believed to be descendants of the Rau people, who settled on the island thousands of years ago. They also form a 'clean clade' with Taiwanese aborigines such as Ami and Atayal. DNA analysis carried out amongst the modern Hlai population indicate a close relationship with populations in the southern Chinese province of Guangxi. Most of them have Y-DNA O1a and O1b.

A 2019 study states that the Hlai show genetic affinities with Tai-Kadai-speaking groups (i.e. Zhuang and Dong) and Hmong-Mien-speaking groups (i.e. Miao groups). In contrast, Han Chinese from Hainan Island exhibit affinities with Tujia, Bai, She, Yunnan Yi and Sinitic-speaking populations. A 2022 study shows that Hlai are enriched with ~85% Baiyue ancestry due to their geographic isolation. They cluster with Austronesians that harbor more divergent ancestry, such as the Ami, Atayal, and Kankanaey. Compared to other Kra-Dai groups, they did not heavily mix with groups like Guangxi populations and Han Chinese. However, there is evidence of admixture between Hlai and Han Chinese about 2000 years ago, with some Hlai having about 56.56% Han ancestry as a result. In addition, there is evidence that the Kinh Vietnamese diverged earlier from the Hlai than the Dai diverged from Hlai. Other studies alternatively suggest that the Longli Bouyei and Qiandongnan Dong, whom Kinh Vietnamese cluster with, are a good representative of the 'ancestral Tai-Kadai' population.

== Notable people ==
- Su Yunying, singer

== Bibliography ==
- Churchman, Catherine (2015), Where to Draw the Line? The Chinese Southern Frontier in the Fifth and Sixth Centuries
- Csete, Anne (2006), Ethnicity, Conflict, and the State in the Early to Mid-Qing
- Murray, Jeremy A. (2017), China's Lonely Revolution
- He, Guanglin; Wang, Zheng; Guo, Jianxin; Wang, Mengge (March 2020). "Inferring the population history of Tai-Kadai-speaking people and southernmost Han Chinese on Hainan Island by genome-wide array genotyping". European Journal of Human Genetics. 28 (D1): 1111–1123. doi:10.1038/s41431-020-0599-7. PMC 7381617. PMID 32123326.
