= E language =

Sino-Tibetan mixed language from Tai and Chinese

E
- Ei, Wuse
- Kjang E
- Pronunciation: [ɛ˥], [kiaŋ˥ ɛ˥]
- Native to: China
- Region: Guangxi
- Native speakers: 5,000 (2016)
- Language family: mixed Tai–Pinghua

Language codes
- ISO 639-3: eee
- Glottolog: eeee1240
- Guangxi, of which E is spoken in a small area

E (E pronunciation: [ɛ˥]), also known as Ei, Wuse, or Wusehua, (simplified Chinese: 五色话; traditional Chinese: 五色話; pinyin: Wǔsèhuà; lit. 'colored language') is a Tai–Chinese mixed language spoken primarily in Rongshui Miao Autonomous County, Guangxi, China. It contains features of both Tai and Chinese varieties, generally adopting Chinese vocabulary into Tai grammar. E is a tonal language—distinguishing between seven tones—and contains a few rare phonemes: voiceless versions of the more common nasal consonants and alveolar lateral approximant.

== Etymology ==
The E language's unusual name, which is also an autonym, derives from the pinyin transliteration of the rare Mandarin syllable 诶; 誒; ê̄ (E pronunciation: [ɛ˥]), which conventionally denotes an expression of affirmation (and is distinguished from ē in pinyin by the use of a circumflex). The language's speakers also refer to their language as Kjang E [kiaŋ˥ ɛ˥]. Wusehua is a derogatory name for E.

== Geographical distribution ==
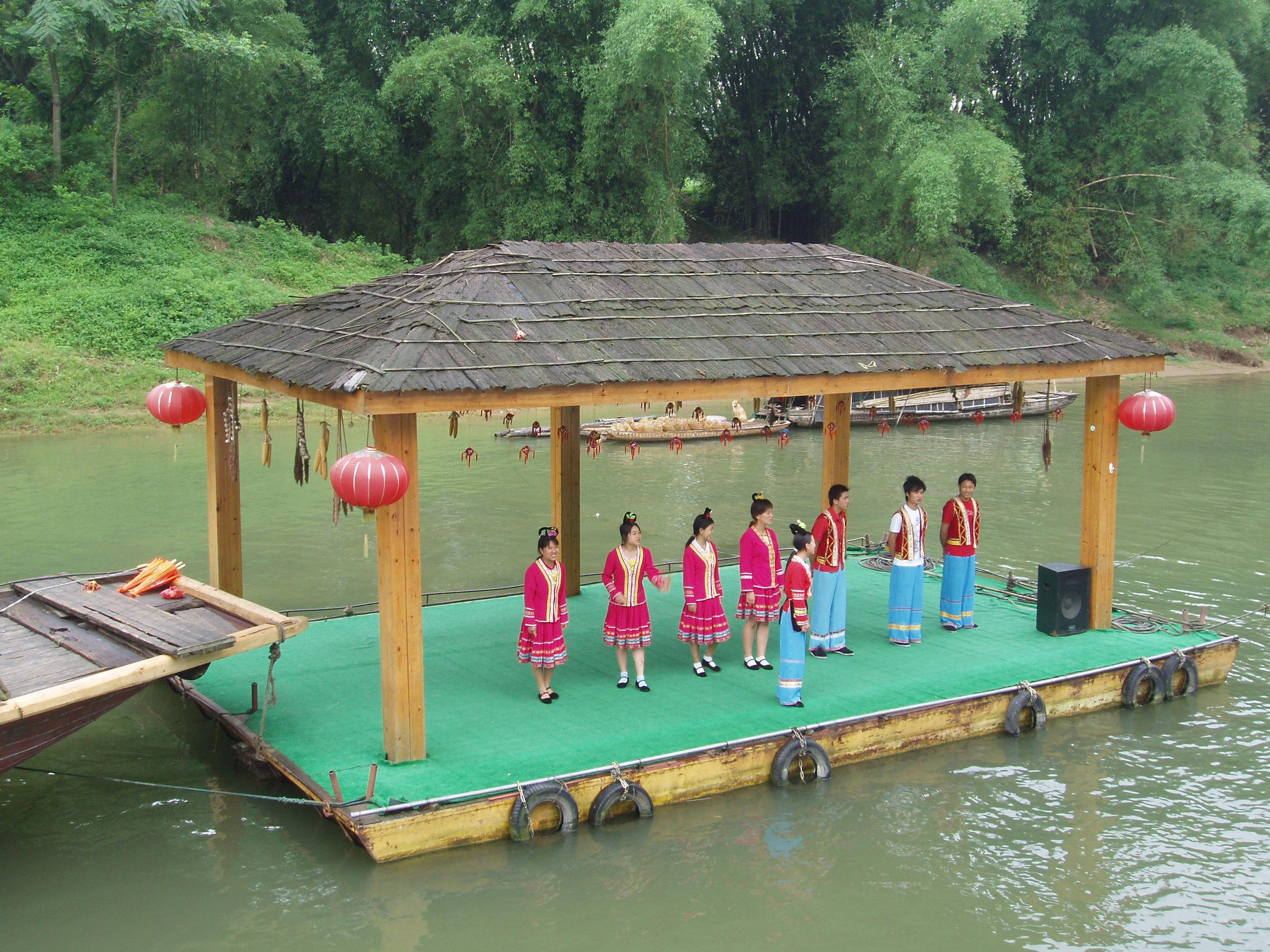
Zhuang people in Guilin

In 1992, E was spoken by about 30,000 people, but by 2008 this number had dwindled to 9,000. Gao (2016) reported that there were 5,000 speakers of E. Most E speakers are classified as Zhuang by the Chinese government. E speakers live in Rongshui Miao Autonomous County and border areas of Luocheng Mulao Autonomous County in Guangxi. In Rongshui County, the three main villages inhabited by E speakers are Xiatan 下覃村, Simo 四莫村, and Xinglong 兴隆村 in Yongle Township 永乐乡. E speakers' most commonly spoken other languages are the Liujia dialect (六甲话) of Yue Chinese and the Guiliu variant of Southwestern Mandarin.

== Phonology ==
E's consonant and vowel inventories are mostly similar to those of its parent languages. However, it contains a few unusual consonants: the voiceless nasal consonants [n̥], [ŋ̊], [m̥], and the voiceless alveolar lateral approximant [l̥]. All are voiceless versions of consonants that, in most languages, are always voiced. E allows syllabic consonants and diphthongs.

E consonants
		Labial	Dental/ Alveolar		Palatal	Velar		Glottal
		Labial	plain	sibilant	Palatal	plain	labial	Glottal
Nasal	voiced	m	n			ŋ		
Nasal	voiceless	m̥	n̥			ŋ̊		
Plosive/ Affricate	tenuis	p	t	t͡s		k	kʷ	
Plosive/ Affricate	aspirated	pʰ	tʰ	t͡sʰ		kʰ		
Fricative		f		s	ɕ			h
Approximant	voiced		l		j		w	
Approximant	voiceless		l̥					

E vowels
	Front		Central	Back
	unr.	rnd.	Central	Back
Close	i	y		u
Mid	e		ə	o
Open	ɛ		a	

=== Tone ===
Like many Mainland Southeast Asian languages, including Tai and the varieties of Chinese, E is tonal. The language is described as having seven tones, with the seventh varying allophonically with the length of the vowel it is attached to. With numbers ranging from 1 to 5, with 1 being the lowest tone and 5 the highest, the contours of the various tones in E are as follows.

Tone contours
Number		Contour	Tone letter
1.		42	˦˨
2.		231	˨˧˩
3.		44	˦
4.		35	˧˥
5.		24	˨˦
6.		55	˥
7.	short	24	˨˦
7.	long	22	˨

== Grammar and lexicon ==
E is usually classified as a mixed language deriving ultimately from the Tai-Kadai and Sino-Tibetan families, which both inhabit southern China and Southeast Asia. Some non-Chinese scholars, however, consider it a Tai-Kadai language with Chinese influence. Whatever its classification, the grammar resembles that of the Tai branch of Tai-Kadai. E's grammatical features appear to be a mix of Northern Zhuang, Mulam, and Kam. The Caolan language of Vietnam also displays many similarities with E.

The vocabulary, however, is mostly Chinese, based on Guiliu and the Tuguai variant of Pinghua. Out of the 2,000 most commonly used E words, only about 200 are of Tai-Kadai origin. E also inherits elements of these Chinese dialects' phonology and compound word formation. E morphology is primarily analytic, with concepts such as negation expressed with auxiliary words (pat^{6}, m^{2}) and no pronominal agreement.

In its pronouns, E distinguishes for person between first, second, and third; in number between singular and plural; and, in the case of the first-person plural, between inclusive and exclusive we. E does not, however, make distinctions for grammatical gender.

Pronouns
Person	Singular	Plural
1.	ku^{1}	lau^{2} (incl.) kju^{1} (excl.)
2.	ŋ^{2}	su^{1}
3.	mo^{5}	mo^{5} kjau^{1}

Numbers
No.	E	No.	E
1	je꞉t^{6}	6	l̥ok^{6} lok^{7}
2	soŋ^{1} ŋ̊i^{5}	7	tshat^{6}
3	sam^{1}	8	pe꞉t^{6}
4	si^{4}	9	kjəu^{3}
5	ŋ̊a^{3} ŋo^{3}	10	tɕəp^{7} ɕəp^{7}
