= Cun language =

Kra–Dal language of Hainan Island, China

Cun
- Cun–Nadao
- 仡隆语; Gelong
- Native to: China
- Region: western Hainan
- Native speakers: (80,000 cited 1999)
- Language family: Kra–Dai: Hlai; Central; North; Cun
- Dialects: Nadou

Language codes
- ISO 639-3: cuq
- Glottolog: cunn1236
- ELP: Nadouhua

Cun (Chinese: 村语; meaning "village language/speech"), also known as Gelong (仡隆语 / 哥隆语) or Ngan-Fon, is a Kra–Dai language spoken on Hainan Island. It is a part of the Hlai languages branch and has a lexical similarity with standard Hlai at 40%. The language has approximately 80,000 speakers, 47,200 of which are monolingual. Cun is a tonal language with 10 tones, used depending on whether a syllable is checked or unchecked. The speakers of this language are classified by the Chinese government as ethnic Han; in Hainan, Nadou and Lingao speakers are also classified as ethnic Han.

The Cun are descended from Han Chinese migrants to Hainan Island who intermarried with the local Li people. As a result, Cun has more Chinese loanwords than other Hlai languages.

Nearby, the Fuma (Chinese: 付马话, 府玛话, or 富马话) dialect, a variety of Chinese similar to Gan-Hakka that has been strongly influenced by Cun, is spoken in Fuma Village 付马村, Sigeng Town 四更镇, Dongfang City. It had about 800 speakers in 1994.

== Phonology ==
The tables below show the vowel and consonant phonemes of Cun:

=== Vowels ===
	Front	Central	Back
Close	i		ɯ, u
Mid	e	(ə)	o
Open	a		ɔ

=== Diphthongs ===
Cun has many diphthongs. With [a]: [ia], [ua]. With [ə]: [uə], [iə]. With [i]: [ai], [aːi], [ɛi], [ei], [ɔi], [oi], [ui]. With [u]: [au], [aːu], [iau], [eu], [iu], [iːu], [ɔu], [ou], [əu].

=== Consonants ===
		Bilabial	Alveolar		Alv.-palatal	Velar	Glottal
		Bilabial	Median	Lateral	Alv.-palatal	Velar	Glottal
Plosives	Voiceless		t			k	ʔ
Plosives	Aspirated	pʰ	tʰ			kʰ	
Plosives	Glottalized	ʔb	ʔd				
Fricatives	Voiceless	f			ʃ		h
Fricatives	Voiced	v			ʒ		
Affricates	Voiceless				t͡ʃ		
Affricates	Aspirated				t͡ʃʰ		
Liquids				l			
Nasals	Voiced	m	n		ɲ	ŋ	
Nasals	Labialized					ŋʷ	
Semivowels					j		

=== Tones ===
Cun is a tonal language with ten tones. Four of the tones occur only in syllables ending with a consonant: t, k, or p.

Tone	Pitch Value	Example	Meaning
1	35	ʔeŋ35	field
2	44	lai44	ear
3	42	nam42	water
4	21	ʔɔu21	to scratch, to scrape
5	13	loŋ13	path, road
6	55	kaːŋ55	to speak
7	33	tʃhut33	cloth
8	42	khat42	dog
9	21	ʔɛp21	frog
10	13	het13	thorn
