= Jinxiuite =

Sulfide mineral

General
- Category: Sulfide minerals
- Formula: Ni_{18}Bi_{2}SbAsS_{16}
- IMA symbol: Jx
- Strunz classification: 2.BB.10
- Crystal system: Tetragonal
- Crystal class: Ditetragonal dipyramidal (4/mmm)
- Space group: I4/mmm (no. 139)

Identification
- Color: Light green and grey

Jinxiuite is a sulfide mineral discovered in China in 2025. It is a nickel bismuth antimony arsenic sulfide, Ni_{18}Bi_{2}SbAsS_{16}.

== Discovery ==
The never seen before mineral was discovered in the Longhua nickel-cobalt deposit in Jinxiu Yao Autonomous County in Guangxi Zhuang Autonomous Region and was consequently named after the county.

== Composition ==
The mineral contains 17.5% nickel and 1.5% cobalt, which is nearly 80 times higher than conventional mineralization standards for cobalt or nickel ore; typical cutoffs are around 0.2% for nickel and 0.02% for cobalt.
