= Lao language =

Kra–Dai language

Lao
- ພາສາລາວ, phasa Lao
- Pronunciation: [pʰáː.sǎː láːw]
- Native to: Laos; Thailand (Isan); Cambodia (Stung Treng, Preah Vihear and Ratanakiri); Vietnam (Điện Biên, Lai Châu and Sơn La); China (Xishuangbanna)
- Ethnicity: Lao; Isan
- Speakers: L1: 3.7 million (2015); L2: 800,000 (no date)
- Language family: Kra–Dai: Tai; Southwestern; Lao–Phutai; Lao
- Dialects: Northern Lao (Louang Phrabang Lao); Northeastern Lao (Phuan); Central Lao; Southern Lao; Western Lao (Isan)
- Writing system: Lao script in Laos; Thai script in Thailand; Thai and Lao Braille

Official status
- Official language in: Laos
- Recognised minority language in: Thailand; Cambodia; Vietnam
- Regulated by: Educational Science Research Institute, Ministry of Education and Sports and Institute of Social Sciences, Faculty of Arts, National University of Laos

Language codes
- ISO 639-1: lo
- ISO 639-2: lao
- ISO 639-3: Either: lao – PDR Lao tts – Isan (Thailand Lao)
- Glottolog: laoo1244 Lao nort2741 Northeastern Thai
- Linguasphere: 47-AAA-c
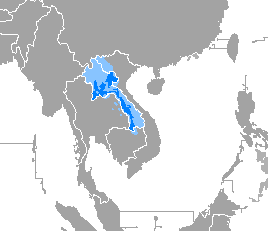

A Lao speaker

Lao (ພາສາລາວ, phasa Lao; [pʰáː.sǎː láːw]), sometimes referred to as Laotian, is a Southwestern Tai language and the official language of Laos. It is also spoken in the Isan region of northeastern Thailand, where it is usually called the Isan language. The political split of the Lao-speaking population along the Mekong River resulted from the Franco-Siamese crisis of 1893. Lao is written in the Lao script, an abugida that evolved from early Tai scripts.

Lao is a tonal and analytic language, characteristics shared with other Kra-Dai languages as well as nearby Sino-Tibetan and Austroasiatic languages. It features high mutual intelligibility with Thai and Isan, enabling direct communication between speakers despite differences in their respective writing systems. The Vientiane dialect serves as the de facto standard.

In addition to being the sole official language of Laos, Lao serves as a lingua franca among the country's ethnically and linguistically diverse population. It is also spoken by diaspora communities, primarily in the United States, France, and Australia.

== Classification ==
- Kra-Dai
  - Hlai languages
  - Kam-Sui languages
  - Kra languages
  - Be language
  - Tai languages
    - Northern Tai languages
    - Central Tai languages
    - Southwestern Tai languages
      - Northwestern Tai languages
        - Khamti language
        - Tai Lue language
        - Shan language
        - others
      - Chiang Saen languages
        - Northern Thai language
        - Sukhothai language
          - Thai language
          - Southern Thai language
      - Lao-Phuthai languages
        - Tai Yo language
        - Phuthai language
        - Lao language (PDR Lao, Isan language)

The Lao language falls within the Lao-Phuthai group of languages, including its closest relatives, Phuthai (BGN/PCGN Phouthai, RTGS Phu Thai) and Tai Yo. Together with Northwestern Tai, which includes Shan, Ahom and most Dai languages of China, the Chiang Saen languages (which include Standard Thai, Khorat Thai, and Tai Lanna) and Southern Tai form the Southwestern branch of Tai languages. Lao (including Isan) and Thai, although they occupy separate groups, are mutually intelligible and were pushed closer through contact and Khmer influence, but all Southwestern Tai languages are mutually intelligible to some degree. The Tai languages also include the languages of the Zhuang, which are split into the Northern and Central branches of the Tai languages. The Tai languages form a major division within the Kra-Dai language family, distantly related to other languages of southern China, such as the Hlai and Be languages of Hainan and the Kra and Kam-Sui languages in mainland China and in neighbouring regions of northern Vietnam.

== History ==
=== Tai migration (8th–12th century) ===
Map showing the general migration patterns and diversification of the Tai peoples and languages from the original Tai Urheimat of southeastern China

The ancestors of the Lao people were speakers of Southwestern Tai dialects that migrated from what is now southeastern China, specifically what is now Guangxi and northern Vietnam where the diversity of various Tai languages suggests an Urheimat. The Southwestern Tai languages began to diverge from the Northern and Central branches of the Tai languages, covered mainly by various Zhuang languages, sometime around 112 CE, but likely completed by the 6th century. Due to the influx of Han Chinese soldiers and settlers, the end of the Chinese occupation of Vietnam, the fall of Jiaozhi and turbulence associated with the decline and fall of the Tang dynasty led some of the Tai peoples speaking Southwestern Tai to flee into Southeast Asia, with the small-scale migration mainly taking place between the 8th and 12th centuries. The Tais split and followed the major river courses, with the ancestral Lao originating in the Tai migrants that followed the Mekong River.

=== Divergence and convergence ===
As the Southwestern Tai-speaking peoples diverged, following paths down waterways, their dialects began to diverge into the various languages today, such as the Lao-Phuthai languages that developed along the Mekong River and includes Lao and its Isan sub-variety and the Chiang Saen languages which includes the Central Thai dialect that is the basis of Standard Thai. Despite their close relationship, there were several phonological divergences that drifted the languages apart with time such as the following examples:

PSWT *ml > Lao /m/, > Thai /l/

{} {} ມື່ນ {} ลื่น
{} {} muen {} luen
*mlɯn $\rightarrow$ /mɯ̄ːn/ $\rightarrow$ /lɯ̂ːn/
'slippery' {} {} {} {}

PSWT *r (initial) > Lao /h/, > Thai /r/

{} {} ຮາກ {} ราก
{} {} hak {} rak
*raːk $\rightarrow$ /hâːk/ $\rightarrow$ /râːk/
{'to vomit'} {} {} {} {}

PSWT *ɲ > Lao /ɲ/, > Thai /j/

{} {} ຍູງ {} ยุง
{} {} nyung {} yung
*ɲuŋ $\rightarrow$ /ɲúːŋ/ $\rightarrow$ /jūŋ/
'mosquito' {} {} {} {}

Similar influences and proximity allowed for both languages to converge in many aspects as well. Thai and Lao, although separated, passively influenced each other through centuries of proximity. For instance, the Proto-Southwestern Tai *mlɛːŋ has produced the expected Lao /m/ outcome maeng (ແມງ mèng, /mɛ́ːŋ/) and the expected Thai /l/ outcome laeng (แลง /lɛ̄ːŋ/), although this is used only in Royal Thai or restricted academic usage, with the common form malaeng (แมลง /máʔ.lɛ̄ːŋ/), actually an archaic variant. In slang and relaxed speech, Thai also has maeng (แมง /mɛ̄ːŋ/), likely due to influence of Lao.

Thai and Lao also share similar sources of loan words. Aside from many of the deeply embedded Sinitic loan words adopted at various points in the evolution of Southwestern Tai at the periphery of Chinese influence, the Tais in Southeast Asia encountered the Khmer. Khmer loan words dominate all areas and registers of both languages and many are shared between them. Khmer loan words include body parts, urban living, tools, administration and local plants. The Thai, and likely the Lao, were able to make Khmer-style coinages that were later exported back to Khmer. The heavy imprint of Khmer is shown in the genetics of Tai speakers, with samples from Thai and Isan people of Lao descent showing proof of both the Tai migration but also intermarriage and assimilation of local populations. Scholars such as Khanittanan propose that the deep genetic and linguistic impact of the autochthonous Khmer and their language indicates that the earliest days of Ayutthaya had a largely bilingual population. Although evidence and research in Lao is lacking, major Lao cities were known to have been built atop existing Khmer settlements, suggesting assimilation of the locals. Isan and Lao commonly use a Khmer loan not found in Thai, khanong (ຂະໜົງ/ຂນົງ khanông, /kʰáʔ.nŏŋ/), 'doorframe', from Khmer khnâng (ខ្នង, /knɑːŋ/), which means 'building', 'foundation' or 'dorsal ridge'.

Indic languages also pushed Thai and Lao closer together, particularly Sanskrit and Pali loan words that they share. Many Sanskrit words were adopted via the Khmer language, particularly concerning Indian concepts of astrology, astronomy, ritual, science, kingship, art, music, dance and mythology. New words were historically coined from Sanskrit roots just as European languages, including English, share Greek and Latin roots used for these purposes, such as 'telephone' from Greek roots τῆλε tēle, 'distant' and φωνή phōnē which was introduced in Thai as thorasap (โทรศัพท์, /tʰōː.ráʔ.sàp/) and spread to Isan as thorasap (ໂທຣະສັບ/ໂທລະສັບ thôrasap, /tʰóː.làʔ.sáp/) from Sanskrit dura (दूर, /d̪ura/), 'distant', and śabda (शब्द, /ʃabd̪a/), 'sound'. Indic influences also came via Pali, the liturgical language of Theravada Buddhism.

The effects of Khmer and Indic vocabulary did not affect all the Tai languages of Southeast Asia equally. The Tai Dam of northern Vietnam were shielded from the influence of the Khmer language and the Indic cultural influences that came with them and remain traditionally a non-Buddhist people. Although the Tai Dam language is a Chiang Saen language, albeit with a lexicon and phonology closer to Lao, the lack of Khmer, Sanskrit and Pali loan words makes the language unintelligible to Thai and Lao speakers.

=== Lan Xang (1354–1707) ===
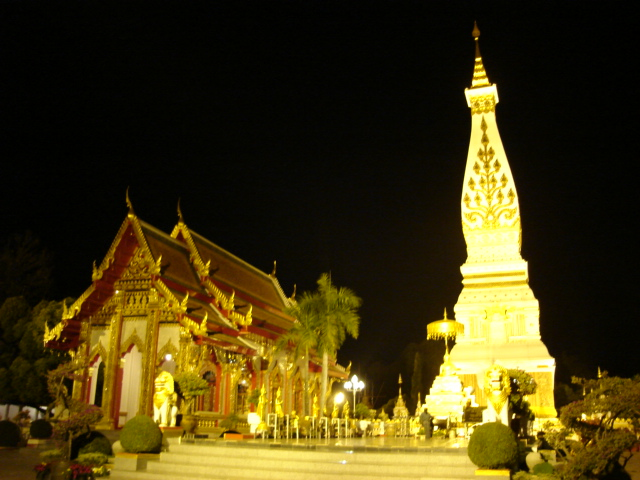
Wat Phra That Phanom in Nakhon Phanom. Built in the 16th century over earlier Khmer ruins when Isan was part of Lan Xang, the temple is an important place of pilgrimage, attracting Lao from Laos as well as Isan to its temple festivals.

Taking advantage of rapid decline in the Khmer Empire, Phra Chao Fa Ngoum (ຟ້າງູ່ມ /fâː ŋūːm/) defeated the Khmer and united the Tai mueang of what is now Laos and Isan into the mandala kingdom of Lan Xang in 1354. Fa Ngoum was a grandson of the ruler of Muang Xoua (RTGS Mueang Sawa), modern-day Louang Phrabang. Lan Xang was powerful enough to thwart Siamese designs from their base at Sukhothai and later Ayutthaya.

Khmer, and Sanskrit via Khmer, continued to influence the Lao language. Since Fa Ngoum was raised in the Khmer court, married to a Khmer princess and had numerous Khmer officials in his court, a now-extinct speech register known as rasa sap (ຣາຊາສັບ /láː.sáː sáp/) was developed to address or discuss the king and high-ranking clergy. Khmer and Sanskrit also contributed many belles-lettres as well as numerous technical, academic and cultural vocabulary, thus differentiating the Lao language from the tribal Tai peoples, but pushing the language closer to Thai, which underwent a similar process. The end of the Lao monarchy in 1975 made the Lao raxasap obsolete, but as Thailand retains its monarchy, Thai rachasap is still active.

The 16th century would see the establishment of many of the hallmarks of the contemporary Lao language. Scribes abandoned the use of written Khmer or Lao written in the Khmer alphabet, adopting a simplified, cursive form of the script known as Tai Noi that with a few modifications survives as the Lao script. Lao literature was also given a major boost with the brief union of Lan Xang with Lan Na during the reign of Xay Xétthathirat (ໄຊເສດຖາທິຣາດ /sáj sȅːt.tʰăː.tʰīʔ.lȃːt/) (1546–1551). The libraries of Chiang Mai were copied, introducing the tua tham (BGN/PCGN toua tham, RTGS tua tham) or 'dharma letters' which was essentially the Mon-influenced script of Lan Na but was used in Lao specifically for religious literature. The influence of the related Tai Lan Na language was strengthened after the capitulation of Lan Na to the Burmese, leading many courtiers and people to flee to safety to Lan Xang.

==== Theravada Buddhism ====
Lan Xang was religiously diverse, with most of the people practicing Tai folk religion albeit somewhat influenced by local Austroasiatic animism, as well as the Brahmanism and Mahayana Buddhism introduced via the Khmer and Theravada Buddhism which had been adopted and spread by the Mon people. Although Lao belief is that the era of Lan Xang began the period of Theravada Buddhism for the Lao people, it was not until the mid-16th century that the religion had become the dominant religion.

With Theravada Buddhism came its liturgical language, Pali, an Indic language derived from the Prakrit. Many Pali terms existed alongside earlier Sanskrit borrowings or were Sanskritized, leading to doublets such as Sanskrit maitri (ໄມຕີ/ໄມຕຣີ /máj.tìː/) and Pali metta (ເມດຕາ/ເມຕຕາ /mȇːt.tàː/), both of which signify 'loving kindness' although the Sanskrit term is more generally used for 'friendship'. The spread of Theravada Buddhism spread literacy, as monks served as teachers, teaching reading and writing as well other basic skills to village boys, and the Tai Noi script was used for personal letters, record-keeping, and signage, as well as to record short stories and the klon (ກອນ /kɔ̀ːn/) poetry that were often incorporated into traditional folksongs.

Shared Pali loan words from Theravada Buddhism
Pali	Isan	Thai	Lao	Gloss
पुञ्ञ puñña /puɲɲa/	บุญ bun [būn]	บุญ bun [būn]	ບຸນ bun [bùn]	'merit' 'virtue'
दुक्ख dukkha /d̪ukkʰa/	ทุกข์ thuk [tʰùk]	ทุกข์ thuk [tʰúk]	ທຸກ thuk [tʰūk]	'suffering' 'misery'
पापकम्म pāpakamma /paːpakamma/	บาปกรรม bap kam [bàːp kām]	บาปกรรม bap kam [bàːp kām]	ບາບກຳ/ບາບກັມ bap kam [bȁːp kàm]	'sin' 'transgression'
अनुमोदना anumōdanā /ʔanumoːd̪anaː/	อนุโมทนา anumo thana [ʔā.nù(ʔ).môː tʰā.nâː]	อนุโมทนา anumo thana [ʔā.nú(ʔ).mōː tʰā.nāː]	ອະນຸໂມທະນາ anoumo thana [ʔā.nū(ʔ).móː tʰā.náː]	'to share rejoicing'
सुख sukha /sukʰa/	สุข suk [sȕk]	สุข suk [sùk]	ສຸກ suk [súk]	'health' 'happiness'
विज्जा vijja /ʋiɟdʒaː/	วิชชา witcha [wìt.sâː] [wì(ʔ).sâː]	วิชชา witcha [wít.tɕʰāː]	ວິຊາ wisa [wī(ʔ).sáː]	'knowledge' 'wisdom'
च‍क्कयुग cakkayuga /tʃakkajuga/	จักรยาน chakkrayan [tɕǎk.kā.ɲâːn]	จักรยาน chakkrayan [tɕàk.krā.jāːn]	ຈັກກະຍານ chakkanyan [tɕák.kā.ɲáːn]	'bicycle'
धम्म ḍhamma /ɖʱamma/	ธรรม tham [tʰâm]	ธรรม tham [tʰām]	ທຳ/ທັມ tham [tʰám]	'dharma' 'morals'

=== Lao Three Kingdoms period (1713–1893) ===
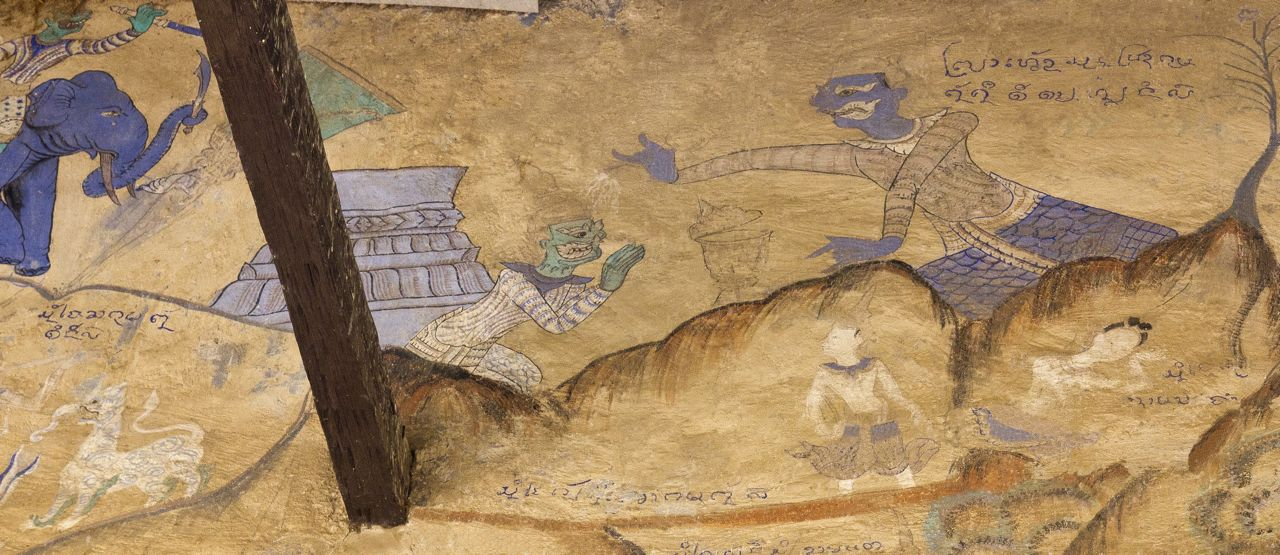
Temple mural of Wat Photaram in Maha Sarakham Province. Dating to the reign of Siamese Ruler Rama III (1788–1851), the writing is in the Tai Tham script, formerly used as a liturgical script in Lao.

Despite the long presence of Lan Xang and Lao settlements along the riverbanks, the Khorat Plateau remained depopulated since the Post-Angkor Period and a long series of droughts during the 13th–15th centuries. The Lao settlements were found only along the banks of the Mekong River and in the wetter northern areas such as Nong Bua Lamphu, Loei, Nong Khai, with most of the population inhabiting the wetter left banks. This began to change when the golden age of Lao prosperity and cultural achievements under King Sourignavôngsa (ສຸຣິຍະວົງສາ /súʔ.līʔ.ɲāʔ wóŋ.sǎː/) (1637–1694) ended with a successional dispute, with his grandsons, with Siamese intervention, carving out their separate kingdoms in 1707. From its ashes arose the kingdoms of Louang Phrabang, Vientiane and later in 1713, the Champasak. The arid hinterlands, deforested and depopulated after a series of droughts, likely led to the collapse of the Khmer Empire, was only occupied by small groups of Austroasiatic peoples and scattered outposts of Lao mueang in the far north. In 1718, Mueang Suwannaphum (ສຸວັນນະພູມ Muang Souvannaphoum, /súʔ.wán.nāʔ.pʰúːm/) in 1718 in what is now Roi Et Province, was founded as an outpost of Champasak, establishing the first major Lao presence and the beginning of the expansion of Lao settlement along the Si (ຊີ /síː/) and Mun (ມູນ) rivers.

The bulk of the Lao, however, settled after 1778 when King Taksin, Siamese king during the Thonburi Period (1767–1782) conquered Champasak and Vientiane and raided Phuan areas for slaves, seizing the Emerald Buddha and Phra Bang (although the latter was eventually returned) and forcing some of the Lao across the river to settle in Isan. Louang Phrabang was spared most of the destruction by submitting to Siamese overlordship. Although the kingdoms remained nominally autonomous, the Siamese demanded tribute and taxes, kept members of the respective royal houses as hostages to ensure loyalty and required the three Lao kings to come to the capital several times a year to hold an audience with the Siamese king. When the kingdoms revolted, the Siamese armies retaliated by rounding up entire villages, tattooing them to mark them as slaves and forced to settle what is now Isan, forced to serve as soldiers or manpower in corvée projects to build roads, to grow food, build canals, or serve as domestics. The greatest population transfer occurred after the Laotian Rebellion by Chao Anouvông (ອານຸວົງ/ອານຸວົງສ໌, /ʔàː.nùʔ.wóŋ/) in 1828 which led to the death of Anouvông and most of his family. The Siamese abducted nearly the entire population of Vientiane and its surrounding area and forced them to the right bank. Continued raids of people continued until the end of the 19th century.

In addition to forced transfers, many Lao were encouraged to settle in Isan, with some disillusioned princes granted lofty titles in exchange for loyalty and taxation, robbing the Lao kings of taxation and wealth as well as what little nominal authority they had left. This greatly expanded the Lao population of Isan and caused assimilation of the local peoples into the mix, a process that is occurring on a smaller scale even now. Siamese intervention paradoxically strengthened the Lao character of the region as the Siamese left the Lao areas alone as long as they continued to produce rice and continued to pay tribute. Direct Siamese rule did not extend past Nakhon Ratchasima, and the Lao mueang, whether paying their tribute directly to Bangkok or the remaining Lao kings and princes, were still nominally part of the separate kingdoms. Temples built in what is now Isan still featured the Tai Noi script on its murals and although Siam would intervene in some matters, daily administration was still left to the remaining kings and various Lao princes that served as governors of the larger mueang. The result of the population movements re-centered the Lao world to the right bank, as today, if Isan and Lao speakers are counted together, Isan speakers form 80 percent of the Lao-speaking population.

=== French Laos (1893–1953) ===
During French rule, missing words for new technologies and political realities were borrowed from French or Vietnamese, repurposed from old Lao vocabulary as well as coined from Sanskrit. These Sanskrit-derived neologisms were generally the same, although not always, as those that developed in Thai.

Whilst previously written in a mixture of etymological and phonetical spellings, depending on audience or author, Lao underwent several reforms that moved the language towards a purely phonetical spelling. During the restoration of the king of Louang Phabang as King of Laos under the last years of French rule in Laos, the government standardized the spelling of the Lao language, with movement towards a phonetical spelling with preservation of a semi-etymological spelling for Pali, Sanskrit and French loan words and the addition of archaic letters for words of Pali and Sanskrit origin concerning Indic culture and Buddhism.

=== Independence and Communist rule (1953–present) ===
Spelling reforms under the communist rule of Laos in 1975 were more radical, with the complete abolition of semi-etymological spelling in favor of phonetical spelling, with the removal of silent letters, removal of special letters for Indic loan words, all vowels being written out explicitly and even the elimination or replacement of the letter 'ຣ' /r/ (but usually pronounced /l/) in official publications, although older people and many in the Lao diaspora continue to use some of the older spelling conventions.

== Dialects ==
The standard written Lao based on the speech of Vientiane has leveled many lexical differences between dialects found in Laos, and although spoken regional variations remain strong, speakers will adjust to it in formal situations and in dealings with outsiders.

Lao Dialects
Dialect	Lao Provinces	Thai Provinces
Vientiane Lao	Vientiane, Vientiane Prefecture, Bolikhamxay and southern Xaisômboun	Nong Khai, Nong Bua Lamphu, Chaiyaphum, Udon Thani, portions of Yasothon, Bueng Kan, Loei and Khon Kaen (Khon Chaen)
Northern Lao; Louang Phrabang Lao	Louang Phrabang, Xaignbouli, Oudômxay, Phôngsali, Bokèo, and Louang Namtha, portions of Houaphan	Loei, portions of Udon Thani, Khon Kaen(Khon Chaen), also Phitsanulok, Phetchabun (Phetsabun) and Uttaradit (outside Isan)
Northeastern Lao; Phuan (Phouan) Lao	Xiangkhouang, portions of Houaphan and Xaisômboun	Scattered in isolated villages of Chaiyaphum, Sakon Nakhon, Udon Thani, Bueng Kan, Nong Khai and Loei (Note: Northeastern Lao is sometimes considered a separate language, as it is traditionally spoken by Phuan tribal members, a closely related but distinct Tai group. Also spoken in a few small and scattered Tai Phuan villages in Sukhothai, Uttaradit, and Phrae.)
Central Lao (ລາວກາງ)	Khammouan and portions of Bolikhamxay and Savannakhét	Mukdahan, Sakon Nakhon, Nakhon Phanom, Mukdahan; portions of Nong Khai and Bueng Kan
Southern Lao	Champasak, Saravan, Xékong, Attapeu, portions of Savannakhét	Ubon Ratchathani (Ubon Ratsathani), Amnat Charoen, portions of Si Sa Ket, Surin, Nakhon Ratchasima (Nakhon Ratsasima), and Yasothon (Note: Southern Lao gives way to Northern Khmer in Sisaket, Surin, and Buriram, and to Khorat Thai and, to some extent, Northern Khmer in Nakhon Ratchasima.)
Western Lao (Standard Isan)	* Not found in Laos	Kalasin, Roi Et (Hoi Et), Maha Sarakham, portions of Khon Kaen (Khon Chaen), Chaiyaphum (Sainyaphum), and Nakhon Ratchasima (Nakhon Ratsasima)

=== Vientiane Lao dialect ===
In Laos, the written language has been mainly based on Vientiane Lao for centuries after the capital of Lan Xang was moved in 1560. The speech of the old élite families was cultivated into Standard Lao as emulated by television and radio broadcasts from the capital as well as taught to foreign students of Lao. The speech of the Isan city of Nong Khai, which sits on the opposite bank of the Mekong, is almost indistinguishable in tone and accent from the speech of Vientiane. Vientiane Lao predominates in Vientiane City, the surrounding Vientiane Province and portions of Bolikhamxai and some areas of Xaisômboun.

In Isan, Vientiane Lao is the primary form of Isan spoken in the northern third of the region which was long settled since the days of Lan Xang and was ruled as part of the Kingdom of Vientiane, including most of Nong Khai, Nong Bua Lamphu, eastern Loei and portions of Saiyaphum and Bueng Kan. As a result of the Lao rebellion of 1826 the Tai Wiang (ໄທວຽງ), /tʰáj wíaŋ/), 'Vientiane people' of the city and surrounding parts of the kingdom, were rounded up by Siamese armies and forced to the right bank, greatly boosting the Lao population of what is now Isan. The Tai Wiang strengthened numbers in the northern third, where Vientiane Lao was traditionally spoken, but were scattered across the Isan region overall, with heavier concentrations in Yasothon, Khon Kaen, and Hoi Et provinces. This likely had a leveling effect on the Lao language as spoken in Isan, as most Isan speakers regardless of speech variety are prone to using /ʋ/ as opposed to /w/ and the informal conversion of syllable-initial /k/ to /tɕ/ in relaxed, informal speech, which in Laos, is particularly characteristic of Vientiane speech. For example, the word kaem (ແກ້ມ kèm, /kɛ̂ːm/), 'cheek', is often pronounced *chaem (*ແຈ້ມ chèm, */tɕɛ̂ːm/).

Vientiane Dialect Six-Tone Distribution
Tone Class	Inherent Tone	Mai ek (◌່)	Mai tho (◌້)	Long Vowel	Short Vowel
High	Low-Rising	Middle	Low-Falling (glottalized)	Low-Falling	Mid-Rising
Middle	Low-Rising	Middle	High-Falling (glottalized)	High-Falling	Mid-Rising
Low	High-Rising	Middle	High-Falling	High-Falling	Middle (high)

=== Northern Lao (Louang Phrabang) dialect ===
Northern Lao is a very distinct dialect, exhibiting several features and lexical differences quite apart from other Lao dialects except Northeastern Lao (Phuan). Even though it borders the Vientiane Lao dialect region, there is a sharp boundary that divides them. The dialect shares many similarities with Tai Lanna and is classified accordingly as a Chiang Saen language by Ethnologue. The dialect is not common in Isan, restricted to western portions of Loei and pockets of villages spread throughout Udon Thani provinces. The Isan people of Phitsanulok and Uttaradit provinces, particularly the narrow strip hugging the shore of the Mekong and bordering Loei, outside of Isan are generally speakers of Northern Lao. In Laos, it is the primary dialect spoken in Louang Phrabang and Xaignabouli provinces. In the other northern Laotian provinces of Oudômxai, Houaphan, Louang Namtha and Phôngsali, native Lao speakers are a small minority in the major market towns but Northern Lao, highly influenced by the local languages, is spoken as the lingua franca across ethnic groups of the area.

Northern Lao, specifically the speech of the city of Louang Phrabang was originally the prestigious variety of the language with the city serving as the capital of Lan Xang for the first half of its existence, with the kings of the city made kings of all of Laos by the French. Although the language lost its prestige to Vientiane Lao, Northern Lao is important for its history, as many of the earliest Lao literary works were composed in the dialect, and it served, in a refined form, as the royal speech of the Laotian kings until 1975 when the monarchy was abolished. Louang Phrabang remains the largest city in the northern region of Laos, serving as an important center of trade and communication with the surrounding areas.

Despite the proximity to speakers of Vientiane Lao, Northern Lao is quite distinct. Unlike other Lao dialects with six tones, Northern Lao speakers use only five. Due to the distinctive high-pitch, high-falling tone on words with live syllables starting with low-class consonants, the dialect is said to sound softer, sweeter and more effeminate than other Lao dialects, likely aided by the slower speed of speaking. Similar in tonal structure and quality to Tai Lanna, likely facilitated by the immigration of Lanna people to Louang Phrabang after Chiang Mai's fall to the Burmese in 1551, the dialect is classified apart from other Lao dialects as Chiang Saen language by Ethnologue. Northern Lao also resisted the merger of Proto-Tai */aɰ/ and */aj/ that occurred in all other Lao dialects, except Northeastern Lao. This affects the twenty or so words represented by Thai 'ใ◌' and Lao 'ໃ◌', which preserve /aɰ/ in Northern Lao. This vowel has become /aj/, similar to Thai 'ไ◌' and Lao 'ໄ◌' which is also /aj/. Northern Lao also contains numerous terms not familiar to other Lao speakers.

Lack of /aj/-/aɯ/ merger in Northern (Louang Phrabang) Lao
Source	Thai	Isan	Vientiane Lao	Northern Lao	Gloss
*/ʰmɤːl/	ใหม่ mai [màj]	ใหม่ mai [māj]	ໃຫມ່ mai [māj]	ໃຫມ່ *maue [māɯ]	'new'
*/haɰ/	ให้ hai [hâj]	ให้ hai [hàj]	ໃຫ້ hai [hȁj]	ໃຫ້ *haue [hȁɯ]	'to give'
*/cɤɰ/	ใจ chai [tɕāj]	ใจ chai [tɕàj]	ໃຈ chai [tɕàj]	ໃຈ *chaue [tɕǎɯ]	'heart'
*/C̥.daɰ/	ใน nai [nāj]	ใน nai [nâj]	ໃນ nai [náj]	ໃນ *naue [na᷇ɯ]	'inside'
*/mwaj/	ไม้ mai [máːj]	ไม้ mai [mȁj]	ໄມ້ mai [mâj]	ໄມ້ mai [ma᷇j]	'wood'. 'tree'
*/wɤj/	ไฟ fai [fāj]	ไฟ fai [fâj]	ໄຟ fai [fáj]	ໄຟ fai [fa᷇j]	'fire'

Northern Lao dialectal words
Thai	Isan	Vientiane Lao	Northern Lao	Gloss
เล่น len [lên]	หลิ้น lin [lìn]	ຫລິ້ນ/ຫຼິ້ນ lin [lȉn]	ເອວ (เอว) eo [ʔêːw]	'to joke', 'to play'
ลิง ling [līŋ]	ลิง ling [lîŋ]	ລີງ ling [líːŋ]	ລິງ (ลิง) ling [lîŋ]	'monkey'
ขนมปัง khanom pang [kʰā.nǒm pàŋ]	ข้าวจี่ ขนมปัง khao chi khanom pang [kʰà(ː)w tɕíː] [kʰā.nǒm pàŋ]	ເຂົ້າຈີ່ khao chi [kʰȁ(ː)w tɕīː]	ຂມົນປັງ (ขนมปัง) khanom pang [kʰā-, xā.nǒm pâŋ]	'bread'
ห่อ ho [hɔ̀ː]	ห่อ ho [hɔ̄ː]	ຫໍ່ ho [hɔ̄ː]	ຄູ່ (คู่) khu [kʰu᷇ː, xu᷇ː]	'parcel', 'package'

Northern Lao (Louang Phrabang) Dialect Tone Distribution
Tone Class	Inherent Tone	Mai ek (◌່)	Mai tho (◌້)	Long Vowel	Short Vowel
High	Mid-Falling Rising	Middle	High-Falling (glottalized)	High-Falling	Mid-Rising
Middle	Low-Rising	Middle	Mid-Rising (glottalized)	High-Falling	Mid-Rising
Low	Low-Rising	Middle	Mid-Rising	Mid-Rising	Middle

=== Northeastern Lao dialect (Tai Phouan) ===
The Phuan language is a Chiang Saen (Thai) language rather than part of the Lao–Phutai languages, but it is considered a Lao dialect in Laos. As a Tai language of northern Southeast Asia, it shares many similarities with Tai Dam and Tai Lan Na. In contrast to other minority languages of Isan, it is not losing ground to the Thai or Isan language in Isan.

=== Central Lao ===
Central Lao represents a transitional variety, with northern varieties closer to Vientiane Lao and southern varieties, roughly south of the confluence of the Xé Noi river with the Mekong, the speech varieties begin to approach Southern Lao. Some linguists, such as Hartmann, place Vientiane Lao and Central Lao together as a singular dialect region. More Vientiane-like speech predominates in the Isan provinces of Bueng Kan, Sakon Nakhon, most of Nakhon Phanom and some areas of Nong Khai provinces and on the Laotian side, portions of eastern and southern Bolikhamxai and Khammouan provinces. More Southern Lao features are found in the speech of Mukdahan and southern Nakhon Phanom provinces of Thailand and Savannakhét Province of Laos.

Nevertheless, the tones of the southern Central varieties, such as spoken in Mukdahan, Thailand and Savannakhét, Laos have a tonal structure more akin to Vientiane Lao, sharing certain splits and contours. These areas do, however, exhibit some Southern features of their lexicon, such as the common use of se (ເຊ xé, /sêː/), 'river', which is typical of Southern Lao as opposed to nam (ນ້ຳ, /nȃːm/), which is the more common word and also signifies 'water' in general. Mukdahan-Savannakhét area speakers also understand maethao (ແມ່ເຖົ້າ, /mɛ́ː.tʰȁw/) as a respectful term for an 'old lady' (as opposed to Vientiane 'mother-in-law') and use pen sang (ເປັນສັງ, /pȅn sȁŋ/) instead of Vientiane pen yang (ເປັນຫຍັງ, /pèn ɲăŋ/), 'what's wrong?', as is typical of Southern Lao.

Central Dialect Tone Distribution (Savannakhét)
Tone Class	Inherent Tone	Mai ek (◌່)	Mai tho (◌້)	Long Vowel	Short Vowel
High	Rising	Middle	Low-Falling	Rising	Low-Falling
Middle	High-Falling	Middle	Rising-Falling	Rising	Low-Falling
Low	High-Falling	Middle	Rising-Falling	High-Falling	Middle

=== Southern Lao ===
Southern Lao is spoken along the southern third of Isan and Laos. This region covers the Thai provinces of Surin, Buriram and Sisaket, where a large minority of speakers are Khmer people speaking the archaic northern variety of Khmer and another Austroasiatic people, the Kuy people, use Southern Lao as a second language to engage with their Isan neighbors. It is also spoken in Ubon Ratsathani, Amnat Charoen and portions of Yasothon and Nakhon Ratsasima. In Laos, it is the primary dialect of Champasak, Salavan, Attapeu and Xékong provinces. There are also small pockets of speakers located in Steung Treng Province, Cambodia or Siang Taeng (ຊຽງແຕງ, /síaŋ tɛ̀ːŋ/), particularly near the Mekong River close to the Laotian border. Many of the areas where Southern Lao is spoken were formerly part of the Kingdom of Champasak, one of the three successor states to the Kingdom of Lan Xang, prior to the division of the Lao-speaking world between France and Siam.

Compared to other Isan and Lao dialects, Southern Lao has low tones in syllables that begin with high- or middle-class consonants and have long vowels. High- and middle-class consonants marked with the mai tho tone mark are low and low-falling, respectively, but in these cases are pronounced with very strong glottalization, which can be described as 'creaky'. Combined with the somewhat faster manner of speaking and reduced tendency to soften consonants at the end of words, Southern Lao sounds very rough and harsh to speakers of other dialects. Many of these features, such as the faster speaking pace and glottalization may be influences from Austroasiatic languages as most of the region was inhabited by the Khmer, Kuy and various other Austroasiatic peoples until the 18th century when the Lao began to settle and even now, Khmer speakers comprise half the population of Surin and roughly a quarter each of the populations of Sisaket and Buriram provinces.

Specific dialectal words include don (ດອນ, /dɔːn/), 'riparian island', se (ເຊ xé, /sȅː/)) and many of the words used in Savannakhét that are more typical of Southern Lao such as mae thao (ແມ່ເຖົ້າ, /mɛ́ː tʰȁw/) as a respectful term for an 'old lady' (as opposed to Vientiane 'mother-in-law') and use pen sang (ເປັນສັງ, /pȅn sȁŋ/) instead of Vientiane pen yang (ເປັນຫຍັງ pén gnang, /pen ɲăŋ/), 'what's wrong?'. Possibly as a result of historical Khmer influence and current influences from Thai, Southern dialects tend to pronounce some words with initial Proto-Southwestern Tai */r/ as either the rhotic tap /ɾ/ or a strongly velarized /ɬ/ which is confused with /d/ by speakers of other Lao dialects which have /h/. For example, Vientiane Lao hap (ຮັບ, /hāp/), 'to receive', and hong haem (ໂຮງແຮມ hônghèm, /hóːŋ hɛ́ːm/) are pronounced as lap (ລັບ, /ɾàp/) and honglaem (ໂຮງແລມ hônglèm, /hɔ̏ːŋ ɾɛ̏ːm/), respectively but may sound like *dap and *hongdaem (hông dèm) to other Lao, but are really a strongly velarized /ɬ/ or a rhotic tap /ɾ/. Southerners also tend to use chak (ຈັກ, /tɕa᷇k/) to mean 'to know someone' as opposed to hu chak (ຮູ້ຈັກ hou chak, /hȗː tɕák/) used in all other dialects.

Southern Dialect Tone (Pakxé) Distribution
Tone Class	Inherent Tone	Mai ek (◌່)	Mai tho (◌້)	Long Vowel	Short Vowel
High	High-Rising	Lower-Middle	Low (glottalized)	Low	High-Rising
Middle	Middle	Lower-Middle	Low-Falling (glottalized)	Low	High-Rising
Low	Mid-Falling	Lower-Middle	Low-Falling	Low-Falling	Lower-Middle (short)

=== Western Lao ===
Western Lao (Standard Isan) does not occur in Laos but is the primary dialect of Khon Kaen, Kalasin, Roi Et, and Maha Sarakham in Isan, Thailand. It is also spoken in much of Chaiyaphum and portions of Nakhon Ratsasima.

Western Lao Dialect Tone Distribution (Roi Et)
Tone Class	Inherent Tone	Mai ek (◌່)	Mai tho (◌້)	Long Vowel	Short Vowel
High	Low-Rising	Middle	Low	Low	Low
Middle	Rising-Mid-Falling	Middle	Mid-Falling	Low	Low
Low	Rising-High-Falling	Low	High-Falling	Middle	Middle

== Vocabulary ==
The Lao language consists primarily of native Lao words. Because of Buddhism, however, Pali has contributed numerous terms, especially relating to religion and in conversation with members of the sangha. Due to their proximity, Lao has influenced the Khmer and Thai languages and vice versa.

Formal writing has a larger number of loanwords, especially Pali and Sanskrit, much as Latin and Greek have influenced European languages. For politeness, pronouns (and more formal pronouns) are used, plus ending statements with ແດ່ (dae /dɛ̄ː/) or ເດີ້ (doe /dɤ̂ː/). Negative statements are made more polite by ending with ດອກ (dok /dɔ̏ːk/). The following are formal register examples.

- ຂອບໃຈຫຼາຍ ໆ ເດີ້ (khop chai lai lai doe, /kʰɔ᷆ːp tɕàj lǎːj lǎːj dɤ̂ː/) Thank you very much.
- ຂ້ານ້ອຍເຮັດບໍ່ໄດ້ດອກ (kha noi het bo lai dok, /kʰa᷆ː nɔ̂ːj hēt bɔ̄ː dâj dɔ᷆ːk/) I cannot.
- ໄຂປະຕູໃຫ້ແດ່ (khai patu hai dae, /kʰǎj páʔ.tùː ha᷆j dɛ̄ː/) Open the door, please.

=== French loanwords ===
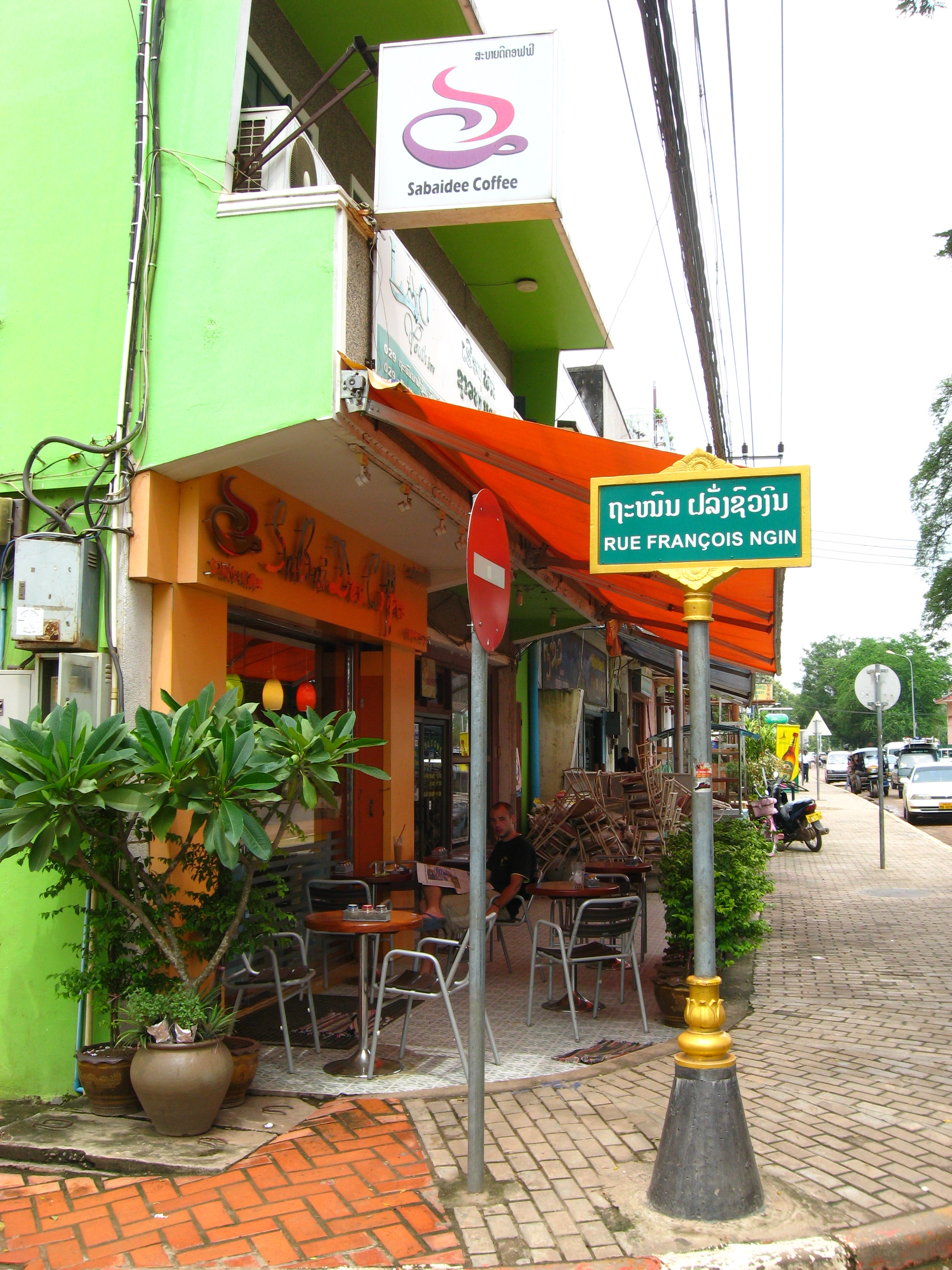
A bilingual Lao-French street sign in Vientiane. Although the influence of French on the Lao language has waned considerably, hundreds of words of French origin are used in Laos.

After the division of the Lao-speaking world in 1893, French would serve as the administrative language of the French Protectorate of Laos, carved from the Lao lands of the left bank, for sixty years until 1953 when Laos achieved full independence. The close relationship of the Lao monarchy with France continued the promotion and spread of French until the end of the Laotian Civil War when the monarchy was removed and the privileged position of French began its decline. Many of the initial borrowings for terms from Western culture were imported via French. For instance, Lao uses sangtimet (ຊັງຕີແມດ /sáŋ.tìː.mɛ́ːt/) in an approximation of French centimètre (/sɑ̃timɛtʁ/). Lao people also tend to use French forms of geographic place names, thus the Republic of Guinea is kine (/ກີເນ/ /kìː.néː/) from French Guinée (/gi ne/).

Although English has mostly surpassed French as the preferred foreign language of international diplomacy and higher education since the country began opening up to foreign investment in the 1990s, the position of French is stronger in Laos than in Cambodia and Vietnam. Since 1972, Laos has been associated with La Francophonie, achieving full-member status in 1992. Many of the royalists and high-ranking families of Laos left Laos in the wake of the end of the Laotian Civil War for France, but as of 2010, it was estimated that 173,800 people, or three percent of the population, were fluent in French and French is studied by 35% of the population as a second language as a required subject and many courses in engineering, medicine, law, administration and other advanced studies are only available in French.

Laos maintains the French-language weekly Le Rénovateur, but French-language content is sometimes seen alongside English in publications in older issues of Khaosane Phathét Lao News and sporadically on television ad radio. French still appears on signage, is the language of major civil engineering projects and is the language of the élite, especially the older generations that received secondary and tertiary education in French-medium schools or studied in France. France maintains a large Lao diaspora and some of the very well-to-do still send their children to France for study. The result of this long-standing French influence is the use of hundreds of loan words of French origin in the Lao language of Laos, although many are old-fashioned and somewhat obsolete or co-exist alongside more predominant native usages. They may be contrasted with the neighbouring languages in Thailand, which borrowed from English instead of French.

French loanwords in Lao
Isan	Thai	Lao	French	Lao alternate	Gloss
เนกไท nek thai [nê(ː)k tʰâj, -tʰáj]	เนกไท nek thai [nê(ː)k tʰāj, -tʰáj]	ກາລະວັດ/ກາຣະວັດ (*การะวัด) karawat [kàː.lā.wàt]	cravate /kʁa.vat/		'necktie'
โฮงภาพยนตร์ hong phapphayon [hôːŋ pʰȃːp.pʰā.ɲôn]	โรงภาพยนตร์ rong phapphayon [rōːŋ pʰȃːp.pʰā.jōn]	ໂຮງຊີເນມາ (*โฮงซิเนมา) hong sinema [hóːŋ sī(ː).néː.máː]	cinéma /si.ne.ma/	ໂຮງຫນັງ hong nang [hóːŋ nǎŋ]	'cinema', 'movie theater' (US)
พจนานุกรม photchananukrom [pʰòt.tɕā.nâː.nù(ʔ).kòm]	พจนานุกรม photchananukrom [pʰót.tɕā.nāː.nú(ʔ).krōm]	ດີຊອນແນ/ດີຊອນແນຣ໌ (*ดิซอนแนร์) disonnae [dì(ː).sɔ́ːn.nɛ́ː]	dictionnaire /dik.sjɔnɛʁ/	ພົດຈະນານຸກົມ photchananukom [pʰòt.tɕā.náː.nū(ʔ).kòm]	'dictionary'
แอฟริกา aepfrika [ʔɛ́(ː)p.fì(ʔ).kàː]	แอฟริกา aepfrika [ʔɛ́(ː)p.frí(ʔ).kāː]	ອາຟິກ/ອາຟຣິກ (*อาฟรีก) afik/afrik [ʔàː.fīk, -frīk]	Afrique /afʁik/	ອາຟິກາ/ອາຟຣິກາ afika/afrika [ʔàː.fì(ʔ).kàː]	'Africa'
บักแอปเปิล bak aeppoen [bǎk ʔɛ́p.pɤ̂n]	ผลแอปเปิล phon aeppoen [pʰǒn ʔɛ́p.pɤ̂n]	ຫມາກປົ່ມ/ໝາກປົ່ມ (*หมากป่ม) mak pom [mȁːk pōm]	pomme /pɔm/		'apple'
เนย noei [nɤ̂ːj]	เนย noei [nɤ̄ːj]	ເບີ/ເບີຣ໌ (*เบอร์) boe [bɤ̀ː]	beurre /bœʁ/	ເນີຍ noei [nɤ́ːj]	'butter'
ไวน์ wai [wâːj]	ไวน์ wai [wāːj]	ແວງ (*แวง) waeng [wɛ́ːŋ]	vin /vɛ̃/		'wine'
คนส่งไปรษณีย์ khon song praisani [kʰôn sōŋ pàj.sā.nîː]	คนส่งไปรษณีย์ khon song praisani [kʰōn sòŋ prāj.sā.nīː]	ຟັກເຕີ/ຟັກເຕີຣ໌ (*ฟักเตอร์) faktoe [fàk.tɤ̀ː]	facteur /faktœʁ/	ຄົນສົ່ງໜັງສື (*คนส่งหนังสือ) khon song nangsue [kʰón sōŋ nǎŋ.sɯ̌ː]	'postman', 'mailman' (US)
ปลาวาฬ pla wan [pàː wâːn]	ปลาวาฬ pla wan [plāː wāːn]	ປາບາແລນ (*ปลาบาแลน) pa balaen [pàː bàː.lɛ́ːn]	baleine /ba lɛn/	ປາວານ pa wan [pàː wáːn]	'whale'
เคมี khemi [kʰêː.mîː]	เคมี khemi [kʰēː.mīː]	ຊີມີ (*ซิมี) simi [síː.míː]	chimie /ʃi.mi/	ເຄມີ khémi [kʰéː.míː]	'chemistry'
บิลเลียด binliat [bìn.lîat]	บิลเลียด binliat [bīn.lîat]	ບີຢາ (*บียา) biya [bìː.jàː]	billard /bi.jaʁ/	ບິລລຽດ binliat [bìn.lîat]	'billiards'
ธนาณัติ thananat [tʰā.nâː.nàt]	ธนาณัติ thananat [tʰā.nāː.nát]	ມັງດາ (*มังดา) mangda [máŋ.dàː]	mandat /mɑ̃.da/	ທະນານັດ thananat [tʰā.náː.nāt]	'money order'
กรัม kram [kàm]	กรัม kram [krām]	ກາມ/ກຣາມ (*กราม) kam/kram [kàːm, -ràːm]	gramme /ɡʁam/		'gramme', 'gram'

=== Vietnamese loanwords ===
Because of the depopulation of the left bank to Siam prior to French colonization, the French who were already active in Vietnam brought Vietnamese to boost the population of the cities and help administer the region. Many Lao that received a French-language education during the period of French Indochina were educated in French-language schools in Vietnam, exposing them to French and Vietnamese languages and cultures. As the Vietnamese communists supported the Pathét Lao forces, supplying Lao communist militia with weaponry and training during the two-decade-long Laotian Civil War, large numbers of Vietnamese troops have been stationed at various times in Laos' post-independence history, although the Vietnamese military presence began to wane in the late 1980s as Laos pursued closer relations with its other neighbors and entered the market economy. Since market reforms in Vietnam, market liberalization has been the main focus between the two countries now.

Vietnamese loanwords into Lao and differences with Thai and Isan
Isan	Thai	Lao	Vietnamese	Lao alternate	Gloss
ก๋วยเตี๋ยว kuaitiao [kǔaj.tǐaw]	ก๋วยเตี๋ยว kuaitiao [kǔaj.tǐaw]	ເຝີ foe [fɤ̌ː]	phở /fə̌ː/	ກ໋ວຍຕ໋ຽວ kuaitiao [kǔaj.tǐaw]	'rice noodles with soup'
เยื้อน yuean [ɲɯ̏an]	งดเว้น ngotwen [ŋót.wén]	ກຽງ kiang [kìaŋ]	kiêng /kiə̯ŋ/	ເຍຶ້ອນ nyuean [ɲɯ̂an]	'to abstain', 'to refrain'
ฉาก chak [sàːk]	ฉาก chak [tɕʰàːk]	ອີແກ້ i kae [ʔìː kɛ̂ː]	ê-ke (Note: Itself a loan word from French équerre) /ekɛ/	ສາກ sak [sȁːk]	'carpenter's square', 'T-square'
เฮ็ดงาน het ngan [hèt ŋâːn]	ทำงาน tham ngan [tʰām ŋāːn]	ເຮັດວຽກ het wiak [hēt wîak]	việc /viə̯̣k/	ເຮັດງານ het ngan [hēt ŋáːn]	'to work', 'to labour'

== Phonology ==
=== Consonants ===
Many consonants in Lao have a labialized and plain form, thus creating a phonemic contrast. The complete inventory of Lao consonants is as shown in the table below:

==== Initial consonants ====
		Labial	Alveolar		Palatal		Velar		Glottal	
		Labial	plain	lab.	plain	lab.	plain	lab.	plain	lab.
Nasal		m	n		ɲ		ŋ	ŋʷ		
Plosive	voiced	b	d							
Plosive	voiceless	p	t		tɕ	tɕʷ	k	kʷ	ʔ	ʔʷ
Plosive	aspirated	pʰ	tʰ	tʷʰ			kʰ	kʷʰ		
Fricative		f	s	sʷ					h	
Approximant		ʋ~w	l	lʷ	j					

==== Final consonants ====
All plosive sounds (besides the glottal stop /ʔ/) are unreleased in final position. Hence, final /p/, /t/, and /k/ sounds are pronounced as [p̚], [t̚], and [k̚] respectively.

	Labial	Alveolar	Palatal	Velar	Glottal
Nasal	m	n		ŋ	
Plosive	p	t		k	ʔ^{*}
Approximant	w		j		

- The glottal stop appears at the end when no final follows a short vowel.

=== Vowels ===
All vowels make a phonemic length distinction. Diphthongs are all centering diphthongs with falling sonority. The monophthongs and diphthongs are as shown in the following tables:

Short vowel phonemes
		Front	Central	Back	
		Front	Central	unr.	rnd.
Diphthongs		iaˀ	ɯaˀ		uaˀ
Monophthongs	Close	i	ɯ		u
Monophthongs	Close-mid	e	ɤ		o
Monophthongs	Open-mid	ɛ			ɔ
Monophthongs	Open		a		

Long vowel phonemes
		Front	Central	Back	
		Front	Central	unr.	rnd.
Diphthongs		ia	ɯa		ua
Monophthongs	Close	iː	ɯː		uː
Monophthongs	Close-mid	eː	ɤː		oː
Monophthongs	Open-mid	ɛː			ɔː
Monophthongs	Open		aː		

=== Tones ===
Lao has six lexical tones. However, the Vientiane and the Luang Prabang dialects have five tones (see below) (Brown 1965; Osatananda, 1997, 2015).

==== Smooth syllables ====
There are six tones in smooth syllables, that is, in syllables ending in a vowel or other sonorant sound ([m], [n], [ŋ], [w], and [j]).

Name	Lao	Phonemic (IPA)	Phonetic (IPA)	Gloss
Rising	ຂາ	/kʰǎː/	[kʰäː˨˦] or [kʰäː˨˩˦]	leg
High	ຄາ	/kʰáː/	[kʰäː˥] or [kʰäː˦˥]	stuck
Falling	ຄ້າ	/kʰâː/	[kʰäː˦˩] or [kʰäː˥˨]	trade
Mid	ຂ່າ, ຄ່າ	/kʰāː/	[kʰäː˧]	galangal, value resp.
Low	ກາ	/kàː/	[käː˩] or [käː˨˩]	crow
Mid-fall	ຂ້າ	/kʰa᷆ː/ or /kʰȁː/	[kʰäː˧˩]	kill, servant

The tones in the Vientiane and Luang Prabang dialects in smooth syllables
Vientiane (Osatananda, 1997, p. 40)			Luang Prabang (Osatananda, 2015, p. 122)		
Name	Tone letters	Example(s)	Name	Tone letters	Example(s)
low	1(3) or ˩(˧) (Note: The tone letters are 13 (˩˧) in citation form or before a pause and 11 (˩˩) elsewhere, e.g., /haː˩˧ paː˩˧/ ຫາປາ "look for fish" becomes [haː˩˩ paː˩˧] (Osatananda, 1997, p. 119).)	/kʰaː˩(˧)/ ຂາ "leg" /kaː˩(˧)/ ກາ "crow"	high-falling-to-mid-level	533 or ˥˧˧	/kʰaː˥˧˧/ ຂາ "leg"
high	35 or ˧˥	/kʰaː˧˥/ ຄາ "stuck"	low rising	12 or ˩˨	/kʰaː˩˨/ ຄາ "stuck" /kaː˩˨/ ກາ "crow"
mid level	33 or ˧˧	/kʰaː˧˧/ ຂ່າ "galangal" /kʰaː˧˧/ ຄ່າ "value"	mid-falling (Note: This tone is realized as a low level tone (22 or ˨˨) in a checked syllable with a short vowel (e.g., [kʰap˨˨] ຄັບ "tight") (Osatananda, 2015, p. 122).)	32 or ˧˨	/kʰaː˧˨/ ຂ່າ "galangal" /kʰaː˧˨/ ຄ່າ "trade"
mid-fall	31 or ˧˩	/kʰaː˧˩/ ຂ້າ "kill"	high level-falling (Note: This tone is realized as a mid level-falling tone (332 or ˧˧˨) in a checked syllable with a long vowel (e.g., [kʰaːp˧˧˨] ຂາບ "prostrate") (Osatananda, 2015, p. 122).)	552 or ˥˥˨	/kʰaː˥˥˨/ ຂ້າ "kill"
high-fall	52 or ˥˨	/kʰaː˥˨/ ຄ້າ "trade"	mid-rising (Note: This tone is realized as a low rising tone (23 or ˨˧) in a checked syllable with a long vowel (e.g., [kʰaːp˨˧] ຄາບ "dead skin of a reptile") (Osatananda, 2015, p. 122).)	34 or ˧˦	/kʰaː˧˦/ ຄ້າ "trade"

==== Checked syllables ====
The number of contrastive tones is reduced to four in checked syllables, that is, in syllables ending in an obstruent sound ([p], [t], [k], or the glottal stop [ʔ]).

Tone	Lao	Phonemic	Phonetic	Gloss
High	ຫັກ	/hák/	[häk̚˦˥] or [häk̚˥]	break
Low	ຮັກ	/hàk/	[häk̚˨˩] or [häk̚˩]	love
Mid-fall	ຫາກ	/ha᷆ːk/ or /hȁːk/	[häːk̚˧˩]	if, inevitably
Falling	ຮາກ	/hâːk/	[häːk̚˦˩] or [häk̚˥˨]	vomit, root

=== Syllables ===
Lao syllables are of the form (C)V(C), i.e., they consist of a vowel in the syllable nucleus, optionally preceded by a single consonant in the syllable onset and optionally followed by a single consonant in the syllable coda. The only consonant clusters allowed are syllable initial clusters /kw/ or /kʰw/. Any consonant may appear in the onset, but the labialized consonants do not occur before rounded vowels.

One difference between Thai and Lao is that in Lao initial clusters are simplified. For example, the official name of Laos is Romanized as Sathalanalat Paxathipatai Paxaxon Lao or Sathalanalat Pasathipatai Pasason Lao, with the Thai analog being Satharanarat Prachathipatai Prachachon Lao (สาธารณรัฐประชาธิปไตยประชาชนลาว), indicating the simplification of Thai pr to Lao p.

Only /p t k ʔ m n ŋ w j/ may appear in the coda. If the vowel in the nucleus is short, it must be followed by a consonant in the coda; /ʔ/ in the coda can be preceded only by a short vowel. Open syllables (i.e., those with no coda consonant) and syllables ending in one of the sonorants /m n ŋ w j/ take one of the six tones, syllables ending in /p t k/ take one of four tones, and syllables ending in /ʔ/ take one of only two tones.

== Grammar ==
The majority of Lao words are monosyllabic, and are not inflected to reflect declension or verbal tense, making Lao an analytic language. Special particle words serve the purpose of prepositions and verb tenses in lieu of conjugations and declensions. Lao is a subject–verb–object (SVO) language, although the subject is often dropped. In contrast to Thai, Lao uses pronouns more frequently.

=== Numbers ===
Number		Gloss	Number		Gloss
໐ ສູນ/ສູນຍ໌ sun	/sǔːn/	0 'zero' nulla	໒໑ ຊາວເອັດ sao et	/sáːw ʔét/	21 'twenty-one' XXI
໑ ໜຶ່ງ nueng	/nɯ̄ŋ/	1 'one' I	໒໒ ຊາວສອງ sao song	/sáːw sɔ̆ːŋ/	22 'twenty-two' XXII
໒ ສອງ song	/sɔ̌ːŋ/	2 'two' II	໒໓ ຊາວສາມ sao sam	/sáːw săːm/	23 'twenty-three' XXII
໓ ສາມ sam	/sǎːm/	3 'three' III	໓໐ ສາມສິບ sam sip	/săːm síp/	30 thirty XXX
໔ ສີ່ si	/sīː/	4 four IV	໓໑ ສາມສິບເອັດ sam sip ét	/săːm síp ʔét/	31 'thirty-one' XXXI
໕ ຫ້າ ha	/hȁː/	5 'five' V	໓໒ ສາມສິບສອງ sam sip song	/săːm síp sɔ̌ːŋ/	32 'thirty-two' XXXII
໖ ຫົກ hok	/hók/	6 six VI	໔໐ ສີ່ສິບ si sip	/sīː síp/	40 'forty' VL
໗ ເຈັດ chet	/tɕét/	7 'seven' VII	໕໐ ຫ້າສິບ ha sip	/hȁː síp/	50 'fifty' L
໘ ແປດ paet	/pɛ̏ːt/	8 'eight' VIII	໖໐ ຫົກສິບ hok sip	/hók síp/	60 sixty LX
໙ ເກົ້າ kao	/kȃw/	9 nine IX	໗໐ ເຈັດສິບ chet sip	/tɕét síp/	70 'seventy' LXX
໑໐ ສິບ sip	/síp/	10 ten X	໘໐ ແປດສິບ paet sip	/pɛ̏ːt sìp/	80 'eighty' LXXX
໑໑ ສິບເອັດ sip et	/síp ʔét/	11 'eleven' XI	໙໐ ເກົ້າສິບ	/kȃw síp/	90 'ninety' XC
໑໒ ສິບສອງ	/síp sɔ̌ːŋ/	12 'twelve' XII	໑໐໐ (ໜຶ່ງ)ຮ້ອຍ	/(nɯ̄ŋ) hɔ̂ːj/	100 'one hundred' C
໑໓ ສິບສາມ	/síp săːm/	13 'thirteen' XIII	໑໐໑ (ນຶ່ງ)ຮ້ອຍເອັດ	/(nɯ̄ŋ) hɔ̂ːj ʔét/	101 'one hundred one' CI
໑໔ ສິບສີ່	/síp sīː/	14 'fourteen' XIV	໑໐໐໐ (ໜຶ່ງ)ພັນ	/(nɯ̄ŋ) pʰán/	1,000 'one thousand' M
໑໕ ສິບຫ້າ	/síp hȁːː/	15 'fifteen' XV	໑໐໐໐໐ (ໜຶ່ງ)ໝື່ນ/(ໜຶ່ງ)ຫມື່ນ	/(nɯ̄ŋ) mɯ̄ːn/	10,000 ten thousand X̅.
໑໖ ສິບຫົກ	/síp hók/	16 'sixteen' XVI	໑໐໐໐໐໐ (ໜຶ່ງ)ແສນ	/(nɯ̄ŋ) sɛ̆ːn/	100,000 'one hundred thousand' C̅.
໑໗ ສິບເຈັດ	/síp tɕét/	17 seventeen XVII	໑໐໐໐໐໐໐ (ນຶ່ງ)ລ້ານ	/(nɯ̄ŋ) lâːn/	1,000,000 'one million'
໑໘ ສິບແປດ	/síp pɛ́ːt/	18 'eighteen' XVIII	໑໐໐໐໐໐໐໐໐໐ (ນຶ່ງ)ພັນລ້ານ	/(nɯ̄ŋ) pʰán lâːn/	1,000,000,000 'one billion'
໑໙ ສິບເກົ້າ	/síp kȃw/	19 'nineteen' XIX	໑໐໐໐໐໐໐໐໐໐໐໐໐໐ (ນຶ່ງ)ລ້ານລ້ານ	/(nɯ̄ŋ) lâːn lâːn/	1,000,000,000,000 'one trillion'
໒໐ ຊາວ(ນຶ່ງ) sao(nueng)	/sáːw (nɯ̄ŋ)/	20 'twenty' XX	໑໐໐໐໐໐໐໐໐໐໐໐໐໐໐໐໐໐໐ (ນຶ່ງ)ພັນລ້ານລ້ານ	/(nɯ̄ŋ) pʰán lâːn lâːn/	1,000,000,000,000,000 'one quadrillion'

== Writing system ==
=== Lao script ===
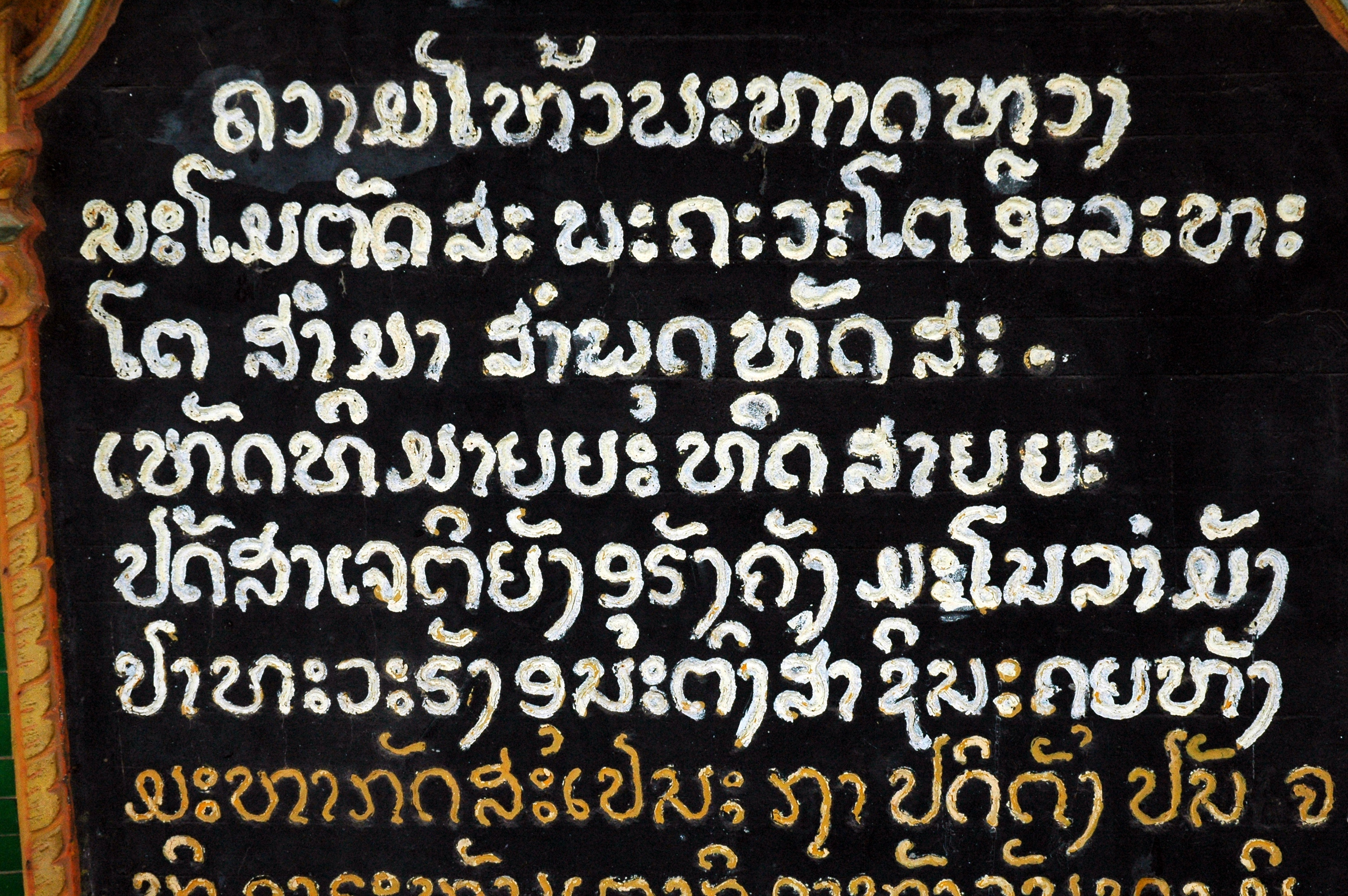
Lao script on a sign at Wat That Luang, Vientiane.

The Lao script, derived from the Khmer alphabet of the Khmer Empire in the 14th century, is ultimately rooted in the Pallava script of Southern India, one of the Brahmi scripts. Although the Lao script bears resemblance to Thai, the former contains fewer letters than Thai because by 1960 it was simplified to be fairly phonemic, whereas Thai maintains many etymological spellings that are pronounced the same.

The script is traditionally classified as an abugida, but Lao consonant letters are conceived of as simply representing the consonant sound, rather than a syllable with an inherent vowel. Vowels are written as diacritic marks and can be placed above, below, in front of, or behind consonants. The script also contains distinct symbols for numerals, although Arabic numerals are more commonly used.

Lao is written in the Tai Tham script for liturgical purposes and is still used in temples in Laos and Isan.

==== Indication of tones ====
Experts disagree on the number and nature of tones in the various dialects of Lao. According to some, most dialects of Lao and Isan have six tones, those of Luang Prabang have five. Tones are determined as follows:

Tones	Long vowel, or vowel plus voiced consonant	Long vowel plus unvoiced consonant	Short vowel, or short vowel plus unvoiced consonant	Mai ek (◌່)	Mai tho (◌້)
High consonants	rising	low falling	high	mid	low falling
Mid consonants	low rising	low falling	high	mid	high falling
Low consonants	high	high falling	mid	mid	high falling

A silent ຫ (/h/) placed before certain consonants will place the proceeding consonant in the high class tone. This can occur before the letters ງ /ŋ/, ຍ /ɲ/, ຣ /r/, and ວ /w/ and combined in special ligatures (considered separate letters) such as ຫຼ /l/, ໜ /n/, and ໝ /m/. In addition to ອ່ (low tone) and ອ້ (falling tone), there also exists the rare ອ໊ (high) ອ໋ (rising) tone marks.

=== Tai Tham script ===
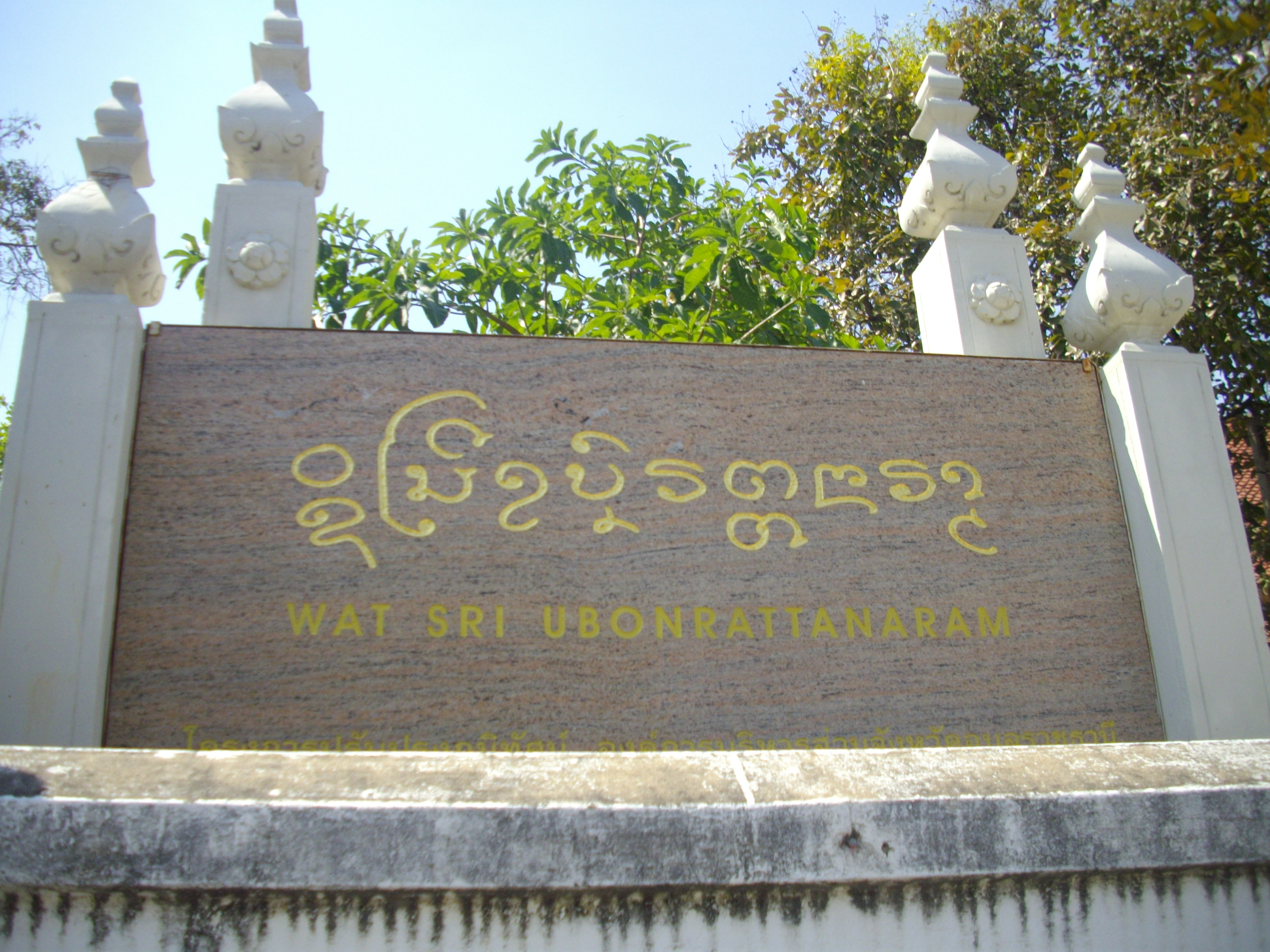
An example of the Tai Tham alphabet formerly used in Laos for religious literature

Traditionally, only secular literature was written with the Lao alphabet. Religious literature was often written in Tai Tham, a Mon-based script that is still used for the Tai Khün, Tai Lü, and formerly for Kham Mueang. The Lao style of this script is known as Lao Tham.

=== Khom script ===
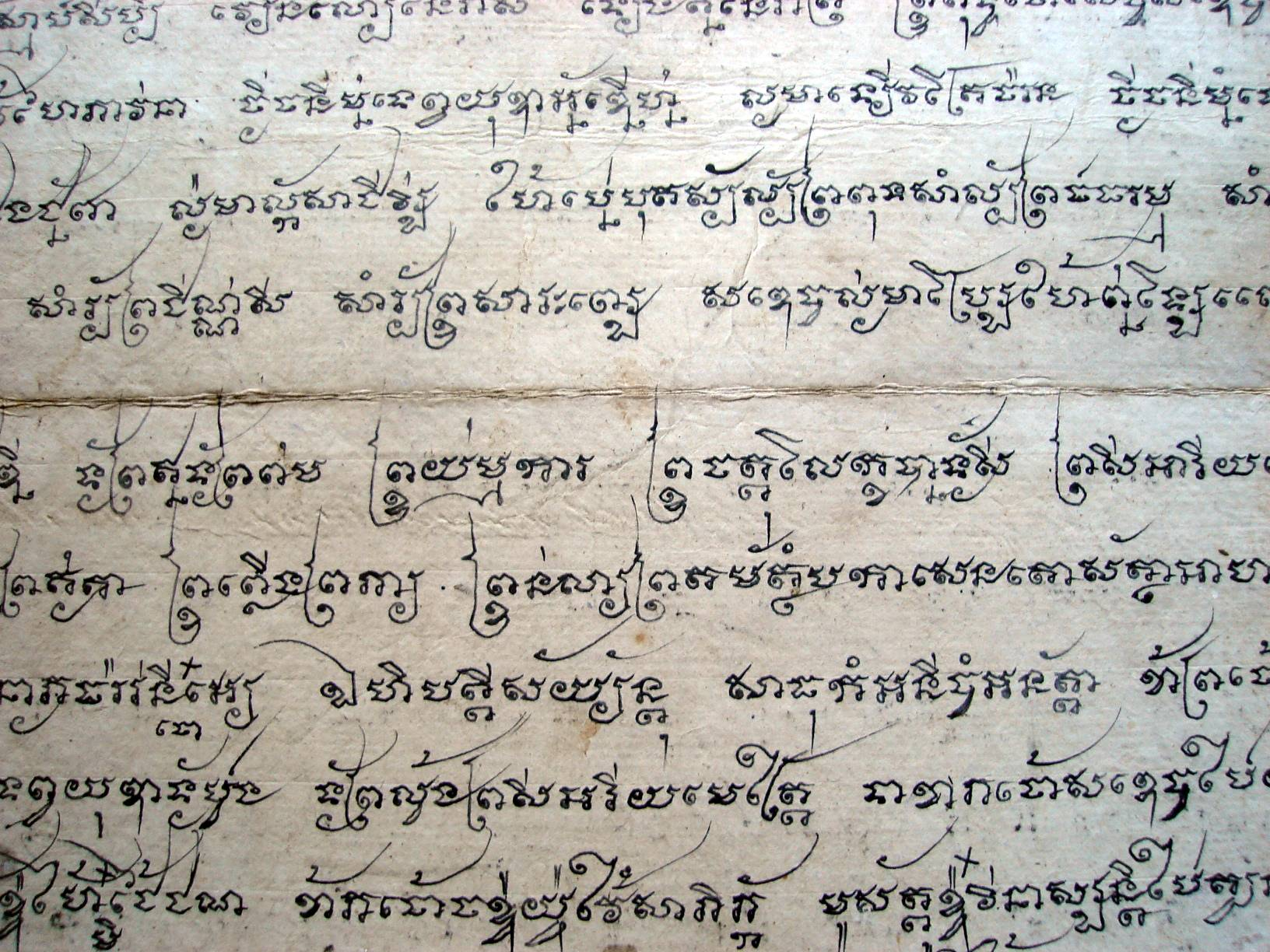
A sutra in the Khom script. This Khmer script was used to write Buddhist, Brahmanic, and ritual texts.

Mystical, magical, and some religious literature was written in Khom script (Aksar Khom), a modified version of the Khmer script.

== See also ==
- Comparison of Lao and Isan
- Comparison of Lao and Thai
- Literature of Laos
- Romanization of Lao
