= Lakkia language =

Kra–Dai language spoken in China

Lakkia
- 拉珈语; Lakkja
- Native to: China
- Region: Jinxiu Yao Autonomous County, Guangxi
- Native speakers: 9,000 (2007)
- Language family: Kra–Dai: Kam–Tai?; Biao–Lakkia?; Lakkia
- Early form: Proto-Lakkia

Language codes
- ISO 639-3: lbc
- Glottolog: lakk1238
- ELP: Lakkia

The Lakkia language (Chinese: 拉珈语; pinyin: Lājiāyǔ), also spelled Lakkja after its IPA transcription, is a Kra–Dai language spoken in Jinxiu Yao Autonomous County, Laibin, East-Central Guangxi, China.

Lakkia speakers are thought to have migrated from further east, possibly from the Biao-speaking areas of Northwestern Guangdong Province (L.-Thongkum 1992). Today, they live mostly in the Dayaoshan (Chinese: 大瑶山; lit. 'Big Yao Mountain') region of Jinxiu County.

== Names ==
Lakkia people are also known as the Cháshān Yáo 茶山瑶, meaning "Tea Mountain Yao", since they were traditionally considered by neighboring peoples to be ethnic Yao people. The name Lakkia is an autonym (self-designated name) that means "mountain people". All Lakkia dialects have 5 tones.

== Classification ==
There is currently no consensus on the classification of Lakkia within the Kra–Dai family. Solnit (1988) and Hansell (1988) classify Lakkia as a sister of the Kam–Sui branch. Additionally, Solnit (1988) classifies Biao and Lakkia together as part of a Biao–Lakkia branch that is coordinate to Kam-Sui. However, L.-Thongkum (1992) considers Lakkia to be most closely related to the Tai branch, based on the large number of shared lexical items.

Norquest (2021) proposes a Biao–Lakkja branch as the first branch to split off from Kra-Dai.

== Dialects ==
Dialects of Lakkia include (L.-Thongkum 1992):

- Jintian 金田
- Liula 六拉
- Jinxiu 金秀
- Lingzu 岭祖
- Changdong 长峒

The Lingzu dialect still preserves /kl-/ initial clusters, which corresponds to /kj-/ in most other dialects (L.-Thongkum 1992). Additionally, Changdong 长洞 and Jintian 金田 tone /˥˩/ (51) corresponds to Jinxiu 金秀 tone /˨˧˩/ (231). Also, L.-Thongkum (1992) reports that Jintian 金田 is a less conservative dialect.

Classification of Lakkia dialects by Norquest (2021):

- Lakkja
  - Western
    - Jintian 金田
  - Eastern
    - Liula 六拉
    - Jinxiu 金秀

== Distribution ==
Lakkia is spoken in the following locations.

- Jinxiu Township 金秀镇: Jinxiu 金秀, Baisha 白沙, Liula 六拉, Xidi 昔地, Changtan 长滩, Chang'er 长二, Zhaibao 寨保, Yangliu 杨柳, Liuduan 六段, Jiangjun 将军, Sanpian 三片, Tiancun 田村, Liucun 刘村, Shecun 社村, Mengcun 孟村, Meicun 美村, Jincun 金村, Jintian 金田, Luomeng 罗梦
- Changdong Township 长洞乡: Changdong 长洞, Gufang 古放, Pingdao 平道, Daojiang 道江, Dishui 滴水, Rongdong 容洞
- Sanjiao Township 三角乡: Liuding 六定
- Zhongliang Township 忠良乡: Lingzu 岭祖, Bale 巴勒
- Luoxiang Township 罗香乡: Pingzhu 平竹

== Phonology ==
=== Consonants ===
		Labial		Dental/ Alveolar		Palatal		Velar			Glottal		
		plain	lat.	plain	lab.	plain	lab.	plain	lab.	pal.	plain	lab.	pal.
Stop	voiceless	p	pˡ	t	tʷ			k	kʷ	kʲ	ʔ		
Stop	aspirated	pʰ	pʰˡ	tʰ				kʰ	kʰʷ	kʰʲ			
Stop	glottalized/vd.	ˀb	bˡ										
Affricate	voiceless			ts									
Affricate	aspirated			tsʰ	tsʰʷ								
Nasal	voiceless	m̥		n̥				ŋ̊		ŋ̊ʲ			
Nasal	voiced	m	mˡ	n				ŋ	ŋʷ	ŋʲ			
Fricative		f		s	sʷ						h	hʷ	hʲ
Approximant		w				j	jʷ						
Lateral	median			l									
Lateral	fricative			ɬ									

=== Vowels ===
Oral vowels
	Front	Central	Back
Close	i		u
Close-mid	e	ə	o
Open-mid	ɛ	ə	
Open	a		

- Other sounds /y/ and /ɹ̩/, also occur in Chinese loanwords as a result of being introduced from Chinese.

Nasal vowels
	Front	Back
Close	ĩ	ũ
Close-mid	ẽ	õ
Open-mid	ɛ̃	
Open	ã	

== Historical phonology ==
Lakkia is notable for preserving many prefixes that have been lost in most other Kra-Dai languages, including prefixes (such as *k.-) in archaic Chinese loanwords that are crucial for the reconstruction of Old Chinese.

== Lexical isoglosses ==
Some Biao–Lakkja lexical isoglosses as proposed by Norquest (2021):

Gloss	Proto-Biao–Lakkja	Proto-Kam-Sui	Proto-Kra	Proto-Hlai	Proto-Be	Proto-Tai
‘house’	*ljaːk	*r̥aːn	*qran	*hrɯːn	*raːn	*rɤːn
‘road’	*tsaːŋ	*qʰwən	*qron	*kuːn	*ʃwən	*r̥wɤn
‘heavy’	*N-tsak	*C-dʑan	*qχəl	*kʰɯn	*xən	*n̥ak
‘leg’	*puk	*p-qaː	*C-qaː	*kʰok	*kok	*f-qaː
‘neck’	*ʔən	*ʔdənʔ	*C-joː	*hljoŋʔ	*liəŋX	*ɣoː

== See also ==
- Proto-Lakkia reconstructions (Wiktionary)
