= Biao language =

Kra–Dai language spoken in China

Biao
- 标话; Kang Bau, Kang Beu
- Native to: China
- Region: Huaiji County and Fengkai County, Guangdong
- Native speakers: 80,000 (2002)
- Language family: Kra–Dai: Kam–Tai?; Biao–Lakkia?; Biao
- Early form: Proto-Biao

Language codes
- ISO 639-3: byk
- Glottolog: biao1257

The Biao language (Chinese: 标话; also known as Kang Bau or Kang Beu) is a Kra–Dai language (or perhaps three languages) spoken in southwestern Huaiji County and Fengkai County, Zhaoqing, Guangdong. Autonyms are kaːŋ11 peu̯55 and kaːŋ11 paːu̯55.

Biao speakers are officially classified as ethnic Han by the Chinese government.

== Classification ==
Like Lakkia, the genetic affiliation of the Biao language within the Kra–Dai family is uncertain, although it could be a sister of the Kam–Sui languages. Hsiu (2014) suggests that Biao could either subgroup with Lakkia, or form an independent branch of Kra–Dai on its own.

== Phonology ==
=== Consonants ===
		Labial	Dental/Alveolar		(Alveolo-) palatal	Velar	Glottal
		Labial	plain	sibilant	(Alveolo-) palatal	Velar	Glottal
Nasal		m	n		ɲ̟	ŋ	
Stop/ Affricate	voiceless	p	t	ts		k	ʔ
Stop/ Affricate	aspirated	pʰ	tʰ	tsʰ		kʰ	
Fricative		f	θ	s			h
Approximant		ʋ	l		j		

- /ʋ/ may also be pronounced as [w] in free variation.
- A labialized sound /kʷ/ may occur, but only in Chinese loanwords.

=== Vowels ===
	Front		Central	Back
Close	i	y		u
Close-mid	(e)	ø		o
Open-mid	ɛ	œ		ɔ
Open			a aː	

- Sounds /m, ŋ/ may also occur as syllabic [m̩, ŋ̍].
- /e/ only exists as a final with consonant ending in sequences /en, eŋ, ep, et, ek/. (Liang 2002: 36-42)

=== Tones ===
The tone categories and contour-tone values for three dialects of Biao are (Liang 2002: 53):

Tone category	Shidong	Yonggu	Dagang
1	˥ 55	˥ 55	˥˦ 54
2	˨˩˦ 214	˧˩ 31	˧˩ 31
3	˥˦ 54	˥˦ 54	˧˥ 35
4	˩˧˨ 132	˨˩˧ 213	˩˧˨ 132
5	˧˥ 35	˨ 22	˧˦ 34
6	˨ 22	˦˨ 42	˨ 22
7 (voiceless checked)	˥ 55	˥ 55	˥ 55
9 (voiceless checked)	˧˥ 35	˧ 33	˧˦ 34
8 (voiced checked)	˩˨ 12	˨˩ 21	˨ 22
10 (voiced checked)	˨ 22	˦˨ 42	˦˨ 42

== Dialects ==
There are three dialects of Biao (Hsiu 2014). The Shidong dialect is documented in detail by Liang (2002). Additional data from the Yonggu and Dagang dialects are documented by Hsiu (2014). A sketch of Yonggu Biao phonology is also documented in Lin (2009).

- Shidong 诗洞
- Yonggu 永固
- Dagang 大岗

Norquest (2021) classifies the Biao dialects as follows.

- Biao
  - Southern
    - Shidong 诗洞
    - Yonggu 永固
  - Northern
    - Dagang 大岗
    - Chang'an 长安

Yang (2012:73) provides the following lexical comparisons for five dialects of Biao.

English gloss	Chinese gloss	Shidong 诗洞	Hezhou 贺州	Yonggu 永固	Dagang 大岗	Liangcun 梁村
bone	骨头	iɐk8	iɐk8	iɐk8	iɐk8	iɐk8
earth, soil	土	pʰiɐn1	pʰɛn1	pøn3	piɛn1	piɛn1
body hair, feather	毛	iɐŋ1	iɐŋ6	iaŋ2	iɛŋ6	iɛŋ6
table	桌子	tsøŋ4	tsøŋ4	tsoŋ2	pɐt7tsoŋ6; tøy6	pɐt7tsoŋ6
vegetable	蔬（菜种得蔬）	lɛu5; liau5	liau5	lɛu5	ly5	ly5
long (time)	久（很久不见）	si2	si6	tsi2	tsɐi6	tsɐi6
dog	狗	mu3	mu3	mɔ1	mɔ1	mɔ1
weave (basket)	编（编簸箕）	hɔo1	hɔo1	hɔ1	hɔ1	hɔ1

Liang (2002: 53–55, 61–62) lists the following comparative data for three dialects of Biao.

English gloss	Chinese gloss	Shidong 诗洞	Yonggu 永固	Dagang 大岗	Page number
shoe	鞋	haːi4	aːi2	aːi2	53
hand	手	hy2	iə2	iə2	53
enter	进	hɔ2	ɔ4	ɔ4	53
stand up	站立	ɲyn1	ɲyn1	nyn1	53
earring	耳环		ɲɛŋ6	ɲɛŋ6	53
water	水	naːm4	ɲaːm4	nia4	54
urine	尿	ɲu6	ɲiu6	nɛu6	54
rain	雨	tsʰan1	tsʰɛn1	san1	54
year	年	pɛ1	pʰui1	pʰui1	54
bow	弓	kʰuŋ3	kuŋ1	kuŋ1	54
grapefruit	柚子	lak8pʰɔ3		lak8pø1	54
scold	骂	ly5	liə5		54
cross over	过	ty6	tiə6	liə6	54
thorn, spur	刺儿	ky3	kiə3	kiə3	54
leaf	树叶	my1	miə1	miə1	54
li (distance)	一“里”路	ly1	liə4	liə4	54
chopsticks	箸	tsy6	tsy6	tsy6	54
book	书	sy3	sy1	sy1	54
moon	月亮	pʰyn1	pʰyn1	pun1	54
release (bird)	放（鸟）	pyŋ5	puŋ5		54
garlic	蒜	θyn5	θun5		54
stand	站	ɲyn1	ɲyn1	nyn1	54
red	红	lyŋ5	luŋ5	luŋ5	54
day	天、日	jan2	wɛn2	man2	55
snake	蛇	tsʰy1	tʰo1	tsʰo1	55
sky	天	man1	man1		61
wind	风	lam2	lam2		61
frost	霜	mai1	mui1		61
pond	池塘	tsam2	tɛm2		61
paddy field	水田	jo6	jo6		61
fire	火	pai1	pai1		61
day	日	jan2	wɛn2		61
foot	脚	puk7	puk7		61
child	儿	liak8	lɛk8		61
grandchild	孙	lɔn1	lɔn1		61
sell	卖	pʰa1	pʰa1		61
come	来	naŋ1	nuŋ1		61
black	黑	muk7	muk7		61
cattle	黄牛	mɔ2	ŋau2		61
dragonfly	蜻蜓	tam1ɲɛu3	kam5tsʰe3		61
grasshopper	蚱蜢	ha1ɲak7	maːŋ3		61
tree	树	muk8	mi4		61
banana	芭蕉	muk8juk8	wai2θiəu1		61
sprout	芽	miu4	ŋa2		61
tongue	舌头	tsʰu1	pʰyə1		62
sit	坐	naŋ6	pʰɔ3		62
will, future tense	会	suk8	ui6		62
blood	血	jan2	lyt10		62
throw (away)	扔（丢）	san5	fak7		62
use	用	sai1	yuŋ6		62

== Distribution ==
Varieties of Biao include the Shidong 诗洞, Yonggu 永固, Qiaotou 桥头, and Dagang 大岗 dialects (Liang 2002:3). In Fengkai County, it is spoken in Chang'an 长安, Jinzhuang 金装, and Qixing 七星. The Fengshan County Gazetteer (1998) reports that in Fengkai County, Biao (piau42) is spoken by 7,217 people in 48 natural villages in Chang'an 长安, Baoshan 宝山, and Dongshan 东山 townships. Fengkai Biao is reported by the Fengshan County Gazetteer (1998) to be a distinct dialect from Biao of Huaiji County. Yang (2011) reports that Biao is also spoken in Liandu 莲都 and He'erkou 河儿口镇 in Fengkai County, and Shatian 沙田镇, Hezhou, Guangxi. Comparative lexical data for 4 varieties of Biao spoken in Shatian Town, Hezhou (namely Fanglin 芳林, Dapan 大盘, Qiaotou 桥头, and Guishan 桂山) are provided in Chen & Yang (2011: 99-100).

=== Yang (2010) ===
According to Yang Biwan (2010), there are more than 160,000 speakers of Biao.

- Huaiji County
  - Shidong Township 诗洞镇 (16 villages): 55,000 speakers. Baiya 白崖话 is spoken in Jianfeng 健丰, Jinsha 金沙, and Feng'an 丰安.
  - Yonggu Township 永固镇 (all 12 villages in the township): 40,000 speakers
  - Qiaotou Township 桥头镇 (3 villages): 10,000 speakers
    - Xinning 新宁: Tansi 潭泗, Rongling 榕岭
    - Xinping 新平: Jinji 金鸡, Gongxian 公弦, Dahekou 大和口, Songgenling 松根岭, Doushui 斗水
    - Hongguang 红光: Guihua 桂花, Zhiwu 植屋, Wanghaotang 旺豪塘, Tanxing 谭杏
    - Small numbers scattered in Jiuxu of Jinxing 金星旧墟, Anshe of Baofeng 保丰安社, Liuhua of Fengzhen 凤真六化
  - Dagang Township 大岗镇 (12 villages): 30,000 speakers. Xiafang 下坊话 is spoken in Shiqun 石群 and Sibao 四保.
    - Dihou 地厚 (all villages)
    - Liangshui 梁水 (all villages)
    - Fulou 富楼: Laochen 老陈, Laoxuan 老禤, Jian'gang 坚岗, Linwu 林屋, Shangcaitang 上彩塘, Xiacaitang 下彩塘
    - Tanzhu 谭珠: Dongxiang 东向, Taiping 太平, Liwu 李屋, Tangmei 塘美, Liuwu 刘屋, Tansha 谭沙, Sanwu 三屋
    - Xiulin 秀林: Baiwu 白屋, Linghui 岭惠, Langwei 浪尾, Bitang 碧塘, Hanggen 杭根, Shankou 山口, Zhuyuan 竹园, Rongshu 榕树, Fenglin 枫林, Xiulin 秀林, Pangmei 庞眉, Xiaguo 下郭
    - Shangting 上亭: Guowu 郭屋, Benji 本吉, Sanzhong 三中, Shegang 社岗, Zhuwu 朱屋, Hongshu 红树
    - Shitian 石田: Niewu 聂屋, Liancun 连村, Qidou 七斗
    - Linggang 岭岗: Shangzhai 上寨, Zhiling 知岭, Fenshui 坟水
    - Dazhong 大钟: Qilong 奇龙, Lianhui 连会, Baishi 白石, Miaozhong 庙中, Ejing 鹅劲, Miaoshang 庙上
    - Shangshi 上石: Fujing 富井, Zhongxinwu 中心屋, Shenshui 深水, Zhongxindong 中心洞, Yangshu 杨树, Shanggaowu 上高屋, Lezhai 勒寨
    - Jiyi 集义: Shuangxi 双溪, Tanbian 谭变, Shuangshimiao 双狮庙
    - Tanying 谭英: Muyuan 木园, Xiazhai 下寨, Guantang 关塘, Kangen 榄根, Liangwu 梁屋
  - Liangcun Township 梁村镇 (7 villages): 18,000 speakers. Xiafang 下坊话 is spoken in Liyang 李样 and Linwu 林屋.
    - Zhenwu 镇武 (all villages)
    - Xiangtian 湘田 (all villages)
    - Shatian 沙田: Matou 码头, Xinlou 新楼, Bailong 白龙, Dacheng 大成, Huangtang 黄塘, Tanle 谭了
    - Guangming 光明: Tanpin 谭聘, Mumian 木棉, Luokong 罗孔, Datian 大田, Nan'an 南安, Beixiang 北向, Dongxiang 东向, Nanxiang 南向
    - Liangcun 梁村: Huilonggang 回龙岗, Tanyuan 谭园
    - Yongyou 永攸: Xiayou 下攸, Xixiang 西向
    - Lanma 栏马: Lanzhong 栏中, Baiwu 白屋, Sanzhe 三折, Nansheao 南蛇凹, Dasonggen 大松根, Taiping 太平
- Fengkai County
  - Chang'an Township 长安镇 (3 villages): 7,000 speakers
    - Chang'an 长安 (80% of villages)
    - Dongshan 东山 (all villages)
    - Baoshan 宝山: Xialuochai 下罗柴, Wenlin 文林, Shandong 上东 (Dongdui 东队), Shangxi 上西 (Xidui 西队), Qiaotou 桥头, Jiongzhou 迥週, Sushui 宿水, Fankou 范口, Dakou 大口
  - Liandu Township 莲都镇 (4 villages): 1,300 speakers; ancestors from Shidong.
    - Sicun 四村: Shuilai 水来
    - Qingshui 清水: Yangmei 杨梅, Zhongxin 中心, Yonggu 涌谷, Pangu 盘古, Datang 大塘, Tongyou 桐油, Luoya 罗雅, Dajiang 大降
    - Shendi 深底: Yingxiong 英雄, Kengjiao 坑脚, Heliping 合理坪
    - Yuntang 云塘: Dalang 大浪
  - He'erkou Township 河儿口镇 (4 villages): 1,750 speakers; ancestors from Shidong.
    - Dongguan 东光 (3 natural villages)
    - Xiangyang 向阳 (all villages)
    - Sandong 三洞 (20% of villages)
    - Pingdong 平洞 (all villages)
- Hezhou
  - Shatian Township 沙田镇 (4 villages): 20 elderly speakers; ancestors from Shidong.
    - Cluster 9 of Qiaotou 桥头第9组
    - Sanzhen of Dapan 大盘三圳
    - Clusters 3 and 4 of Guishan 桂山第3、4组
    - Cluster 11 of Fanglin 芳林第11组

Yang (2012) notes that toponyms in Yonggu 永固 Township with the name “Luo 罗”, and toponyms in Shidong 诗洞 Township with “Liu 六”, “Feng 凤”, and “Nan 南” are of Biao origin.
