= Kam–Tai languages =

Proposed primary branch of Kra–Dai

Kam–Tai
- Dong–Tai; Zhuang–Dong
- Geographic distribution: Southern China, Southeast Asia, Hainan
- Linguistic classification: Kra–Dai: Kam–Tai
- Proto-language: Proto-Kam–Tai
- Subdivisions: Kam–Sui; Be–Tai (Be–Jizhao and Tai)?; Biao–Lakkia?

Language codes
- Glottolog: kamt1241

The Kam–Tai languages, also called Dong–Tai (Chinese: 侗台语支) or Zhuang–Dong (Chinese: 壮侗语族) in China, are a proposed primary branch of the Kra–Dai language family. However, since the 2000s in China, the names Dong–Tai (Chinese: 侗台语支) and Zhuang–Dong (Chinese: 壮侗语族) have been used to refer to the entire Kra–Dai language family, including the Kra languages, due to the extensive documentation and comparative work done on Kra languages in China starting from the 2000s.

== Definitions ==
The term Kam–Tai always includes at least both Tai and Kam–Sui by definition, and can refer to:

1. The entire Kra–Dai language family (as used by Chinese-speaking scholars)
2. Most Kra–Dai branches, but typically excluding Kra and Hlai (in most Western classifications, and also the definition used in this article)
3. A core Kra–Dai group that includes all Kra–Dai languages except for Biao and Lakkia (Norquest 2021)

== History of classification ==
In Western scholarship, a Kam–Tai group consisting of Kam–Sui and Tai is accepted by Edmondson & Solnit (1988). Hansell (1988) considers Be to be a sister of the Tai branch based on shared vocabulary, and proposes a Be–Tai grouping within Kam–Tai. This classification is also followed by Norquest (2015).

However, Ostapirat (2005) and various other linguists do not make use of the Kam–Tai grouping.

== Dispersal ==
Liang & Zhang (1996:18) estimate that the Kam-Sui, Tai, and Hlai branches had already formed by about 5,000 years B.P.
