= Jizhao language =

Kra-Dai language of Guangdong, China

Jizhao
- Native to: People's Republic of China
- Region: Guangdong
- Native speakers: < 100 (2017)
- Language family: Kra–Dai: Kam–Tai?; Be–Tai?; Be–Jizhao?; Jizhao

Language codes
- ISO 639-3: –
- Glottolog: jizh1234
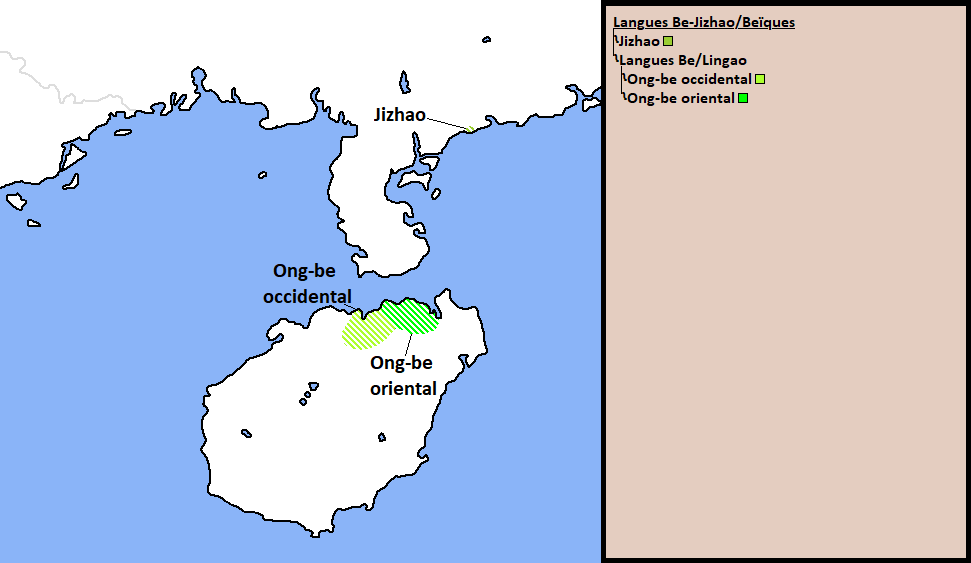

Jizhao (Chinese: 吉兆话) is an unclassified Kra-Dai language spoken in Jizhao Village (吉兆村), Tanba Town (覃巴镇), Wuchuan, Guangdong. It may be most closely related to Be. In Wuchuan, Jizhao is locally referred to as Haihua (海话), which is the term used elsewhere in Leizhou, Xuwen, and Maoming to refer to the local Southern Min dialect of Leizhou.

== Demographics ==
Jizhao is an endangered language that only has speakers above the age of 60 (Shao 2016:70). Within Jizhao Administrative Village (吉兆行政村), it is spoken in the hamlets (natural villages) of Jizhao (吉兆), Meilou (梅楼), and Hong villages (洪村). Jizhao speakers are officially classified as ethnic Han by the Chinese government.

As of 2017, there are fewer than 100 speakers of Jizhao, most of whom are above the age of 70.

== Classification ==
Shao & Meng (2016) observe some similarities with the Be language of northern Hainan, but provisionally consider Jizhao to be unclassified within the Kam-Tai (壮侗) branch. Jizhao has many loanwords from Yue Chinese and Minnan Chinese.

Weera Ostapirat (1998), analyzing data from Zhang (1992), notes that Be and Jizhao share many lexical similarities and sound correspondences, and that Jizhao may be a remnant Be-related language in China.

Li & Wu (2022) classify Jizhao as an independent subgroup of Tai, although Jizhao has many lexical innovations that are not found in the rest of the Tai languages. Li & Wu (2022) propose that Jizhao may form an "Eastern Tai" branch together with Be.

In a 100-item Swadesh list, Shao (2016) found lexical matches between Jizhao and the following languages.

- Ong Be: 56 words
- Zhuang: 6 words
- Yue Chinese: 7 words
- Min Chinese: 1 word
- No parallels: 30 words

== Phonology ==
Jizhao has 6 tones (Shao 2016:15).

1. [˨˩] 21
2. [˧˩] 31
3. [˧˨] 32
4. [˧] 33
5. [˥] 55
6. [˦˥] 45

Jizhao, like Hlai, also has the implosive consonants /ɓ/ and /ɗ/ (Li & Wu 2017).

== See also ==
- Jizhao Swadesh list (Wiktionary)

== Sources ==
- Li, Jian [李健]. 2011. Guangdong Wuchuan Jizhao Haihua de si zhong yuyan chengfen 广东吴川吉兆海话的四种语音成分 / Four Speech Sounds in the Jizhao Hai Dialect of Guangdong's Wuchuan. In Journal of Zhanjiang Normal College [湛江师范学院学报] 2011(4).
- Li, Jinfang [李锦芳]; Wu Yan [吴艳]. 2017. "Guangdong Wuchuan Jizhaohua gaikuang " [广东吴川吉兆话概况]. In Minzu Yuwen [民族语文] 2017:4.
- Shao, Lanzhu [邵兰珠]. 2016. Guangdong Jizhaohua yanjiu [广东吉兆话研究]. M.A. dissertation: Guangxi University for Nationalities [广西民族大学].
- Shao, Lanzhu [邵兰珠]; Meng Yuanyao [蒙元耀]. 2016. "Loanwords of Min dialect in Jizhao dialect in Guangdong" [广东吉兆话中的闽方言借词]. In Journal of Guangdong University of Petrochemical Technology [广东石油化工学院学报], Vol. 26, No. 2, April 2016.
- Zhang, Zhenxing [张振兴]. 1992. "Guangdongsheng Wuchuan fangyan jilve" [广东省吴川方言记略]. In Fangyan [方言] 1992(3).
