= Jinxiu Yao Autonomous County =

Jinxiu County 金秀县 · Ginhsiu Swciyen
- County
- 金秀瑶族自治县 · Ginhsiu Yauzcuz Swciyen; Jinxiu Yao Autonomous County
- Location of the seat in Guangxi
- Coordinates: 24°07′N 110°11′E
- Country: China
- Autonomous region: Guangxi
- Prefecture-level city: Laibin
- Township-level divisions: 3 towns 7 townships
- County seat: Jinxiu (金秀镇)

Area
  - Total: 2,517 km^{2} (972 sq mi)
- Elevation: 787 m (2,582 ft)

Population (2020)
  - Total: 130,313
  - Density: 51.77/km^{2} (134.1/sq mi)
- Time zone: UTC+8 (China Standard)

Jinxiu (Chinese: 金秀; pinyin: Jīnxiù; Zhuang: Ginhsiu) is a county of eastern Guangxi, China, located in an area of relatively high concentrations of the Yao people. It is administered as the Jinxiu Yao Autonomous County of Laibin City. Established in 1952, with the name of Dayaoshan Autonomous Zone, in 1966, it was renamed as Jinxiu Yao Autonomous County. It has an area of 2,517 square kilometres (972 sq mi), much of it mountainous, and a population in 2004 of approximately 150,000.

== Administrative divisions ==
The county administers 3 towns and 7 townships:

Towns:

- Jinxiu (金秀镇), Tongmu (桐木镇), Toupai (头排镇)

Townships:

- Sanjiao Township (三角乡), Zhongliang Township (忠良乡), Luoxiang Township (罗香乡), Changdong Township (长垌乡), Dazhang Township (大樟乡), Liuxiang Township (六巷乡), Sanjiang Township (三江乡)

== Ethnic groups ==
Practically isolated from the outside world until the 1930s, Jinxiu was inhabited by five different branches of Yao: Chashan 茶山, Ao 坳, Hualan 花蓝, Pan 盘, and Shanzi 山子. The first three branches (Chashan 茶山, Ao 坳, Hualan 花蓝) were considered the owners of the lands, as the dates of their first arrivals are estimated at 1,000 years ago. They lived in settled villages and enjoyed some economic stability. The Pan 盘 and Shanzi 山子 are more recent arrivals, and they lived as tenants of the other established Yao people, living a nomadic life that did not allow them to accumulate many material possessions.

== Languages ==
The languages spoken by each five Yao groups are as follows (L.-Thongkum 1993). Unless indicated otherwise, all locations are in Jinxiu County.

- Chashan 茶山 (La Jia 拉架): Lakkja (a Tai-Kadai language); spoken in Jinxiu township
- Ao 坳 (Qiong Lie 穹咧): Bjao Muen; a divergent language spoken in Hengcun 横村, Liucang, and Luoxiang 罗香. The speakers claim to have migrated from Guizhou before they settled in Jinxiu County.
- Hualan 花蓝 (Biao Men 俵门): Ciəmdi Mun (West Mun); spoken in parts of Jinxiu County, with similar dialects in Naxin and Pingli in Baise
- Pan 盘 (Mian 棉): Iu Mien; spoken in Shibajia, Jingui'ao 金龟坳, and Fenzhan 奋战; also in Gunhuai, Baise; an East Mien dialect of Xin'an 新安 and Nadui 纳兑 in Lipu County; and a North Mien dialect of Longwei 龙尾村, Yangshuo County
- Shanzi 山子 (Men 门): Kimdi Mun (East Mun); spoken in Guzhan 古占 and Wangluan

Additionally, Jiongnai is spoken in Liuxiang 六巷乡, and Longhua 龙化村 of Changdong 长垌乡. Mao Zongwu (2004) notes that Jiongnai speakers are also given the exonym "Hualan Yao" 花蓝瑶.

L.-Thongkum (1993:170) proposes the following classification scheme for the languages of the four Mienic-speaking groups, which go back to what she calls the Proto-Mjuenic language.

- Proto-Mjuenic
  - Mun
    - West Mun [Landian Yao 蓝靛瑶]
    - East Mun [Shanzi Yao 山子瑶]
  - (Mien-Muen)
    - Muen [Ao Yao 坳瑶]
    - Mien [Pan Yao 盘瑶]
      - North Mien
      - East Mien, West Mien

== Climate ==
Climate data for Jinxiu, elevation 831 m (2,726 ft), (1991–2020 normals, extremes 1981–present)
Month	Jan	Feb	Mar	Apr	May	Jun	Jul	Aug	Sep	Oct	Nov	Dec	Year
Record high °C (°F)	23.3 (73.9)	28.2 (82.8)	30.7 (87.3)	31.8 (89.2)	32.7 (90.9)	31.9 (89.4)	33.7 (92.7)	33.7 (92.7)	33.3 (91.9)	30.7 (87.3)	27.6 (81.7)	25.6 (78.1)	33.7 (92.7)
Mean daily maximum °C (°F)	13.6 (56.5)	15.5 (59.9)	18.4 (65.1)	22.6 (72.7)	25.7 (78.3)	27.3 (81.1)	28.3 (82.9)	28.4 (83.1)	26.9 (80.4)	24.1 (75.4)	20.4 (68.7)	15.9 (60.6)	22.3 (72.1)
Daily mean °C (°F)	9.3 (48.7)	11.4 (52.5)	14.7 (58.5)	18.7 (65.7)	21.7 (71.1)	23.6 (74.5)	24.3 (75.7)	23.7 (74.7)	21.9 (71.4)	18.7 (65.7)	14.9 (58.8)	10.5 (50.9)	17.8 (64.0)
Mean daily minimum °C (°F)	6.3 (43.3)	8.4 (47.1)	11.7 (53.1)	15.8 (60.4)	18.8 (65.8)	21.1 (70.0)	21.6 (70.9)	20.9 (69.6)	18.9 (66.0)	15.2 (59.4)	11.3 (52.3)	6.9 (44.4)	14.7 (58.5)
Record low °C (°F)	−4.5 (23.9)	−3.0 (26.6)	−2.3 (27.9)	3.3 (37.9)	7.5 (45.5)	11.3 (52.3)	14.0 (57.2)	15.1 (59.2)	10.4 (50.7)	2.5 (36.5)	−2.6 (27.3)	−5.5 (22.1)	−5.5 (22.1)
Average precipitation mm (inches)	62.9 (2.48)	50.4 (1.98)	99.2 (3.91)	138.3 (5.44)	229.9 (9.05)	320.5 (12.62)	273.6 (10.77)	281.1 (11.07)	154.8 (6.09)	73.8 (2.91)	56.2 (2.21)	41.5 (1.63)	1,782.2 (70.16)
Average precipitation days (≥ 0.1 mm)	12.1	11.9	16.2	15.9	18.5	21.4	19.4	19.5	13.5	7.9	8.1	8.6	173
Average snowy days	0.4	0.1	0	0	0	0	0	0	0	0	0	0.2	0.7
Average relative humidity (%)	81	82	84	83	83	85	83	85	83	79	78	76	82
Mean monthly sunshine hours	65.3	59.5	51.8	72.9	91.6	89.2	126.8	124.7	112.6	123.5	116.2	109.0	1,143.1
Percentage possible sunshine	19	19	14	19	22	22	31	31	31	35	36	33	26
Source: China Meteorological Administrationall-time October record
