= Kra–Dai languages =

Language family of Asia

Kra–Dai
- Tai–Kadai, Daic
- Geographic distribution: Southern China, Hainan Island, Southeast Asia, and Northeast India
- Ethnicity: Kra–Dai peoples
- Native speakers: est. 93 million
- Linguistic classification: One of the world's primary language families
- Proto-language: Proto-Kra–Dai
- Subdivisions: Kra; Kam–Sui; Biao–Lakkia; Be–Jizhao; Tai; Hlai–Jiamao

Language codes
- Glottolog: taik1256
Distribution of the Tai–Kadai language family.
Kra
Kam–Sui
Be
Hlai
Northern Tai
Central Tai
Southwestern Tai

The Kra–Dai languages (/ˈkrɑːdaɪ/ KRAH-dy), also known as Tai–Kadai (/ˈtaɪkədaɪ/ TY-kə-dy) and Daic (/ˈdaɪ.ɪk/ DY-ik), are a language family in mainland Southeast Asia, southern China, and northeastern India. All languages in the family are tonal, including Thai and Lao, the national languages of Thailand and Laos. Around 93 million people speak Kra–Dai languages; 60% of those speak Thai. Ethnologue lists 95 languages in the family, with 62 of these being in the Tai branch.

== Names ==
The name "Kra–Dai" was proposed by Weera Ostapirat (2000), as Kra and Dai are the reconstructed autonyms of the Kra and Tai branches, respectively. "Kra–Dai" has since been used by the majority of specialists working on Southeast Asian linguistics, including Norquest (2007), Pittayaporn (2009), Baxter & Sagart (2014), and Enfield & Comrie (2015).

The name "Tai–Kadai" was used in older references and continues to be used in Ethnologue and Glottolog, but Ostapirat (2000) and others suggest that it is problematic and confusing, preferring the name "Kra–Dai" instead. "Tai–Kadai" comes from an obsolete bifurcation of the family into two branches, Tai and Kadai, which had first been proposed by Paul K. Benedict (1942). In 1942, Benedict placed three Kra languages (Gelao, Laqua (Qabiao), and Lachi) together with Hlai in a group that he called "Kadai", from ka, meaning "person" in Gelao and Laqua and dai, a form of a Hlai autonym. Benedict's (1942) "Kadai" group was based on his observation that Kra and Hlai languages have Austronesian-like numerals. However, this classification is now universally rejected as obsolete after Ostapirat (2000) demonstrated the coherence of the Kra branch, which does not subgroup with the Hlai branch as Benedict (1942) had proposed. "Kadai" is sometimes used to refer to the entire Kra–Dai family, including by Solnit (1988). Adding to the confusion, some other references restrict the usage of "Kadai" to only the Kra branch of the family.

The name "Daic" is used by Roger Blench (2008).

== Origin ==
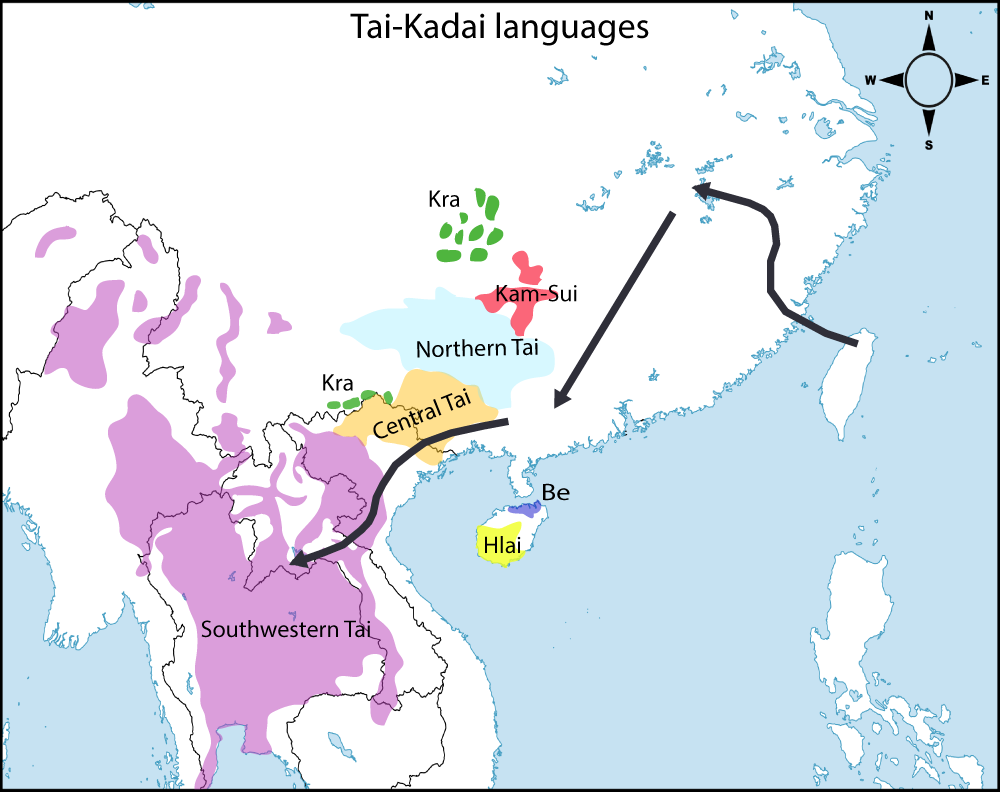
Migration route of the Kra–Dai people from their original homeland of Taiwan via China to Mainland Southeast Asia, according to Matthias Gerner's "Northeast to Southwest Hypothesis".

James R. Chamberlain (2016) proposes that the Tai–Kadai (Kra–Dai) language family was formed as early as the 12th century BCE in the middle of the Yangtze basin, coinciding roughly with the establishment of the Chu fiefdom and the beginning of the Zhou dynasty. The high diversity of Kra–Dai languages in southern China, especially in Guizhou and Hainan, points to that being an origin of the Kra–Dai language family, founding the nations that later became Thailand and Laos in what had been Austroasiatic territory. Genetic and linguistic analyses show great homogeneity among Kra–Dai-speaking people in Thailand.

Although the position of Kra–Dai in relation to Austronesian is still contested, some propose that Kra–Dai and Austronesian are genetically connected. Weera Ostapirat (2005) sets out a series of regular sound correspondences between them, assuming a model of a primary split between the two; they would then be co-ordinate branches. Ostapirat (2013) continues to maintain that Kra–Dai and Austronesian are sister language families, based on certain phonological correspondences. On the other hand, Laurent Sagart (2008) proposes that Kra–Dai is a later form of what he calls "FATK" (Formosan Ancestor of Tai–Kadai) a branch of Austronesian belonging to the subgroup "Puluqic", developed in Taiwan, whose speakers migrated back to the mainland, to Guangdong, Hainan, and north Vietnam, around the second half of the 3rd millennium BCE. Upon their arrival in this region, they underwent linguistic contact with an unknown population, resulting in a partial relexification of FATK vocabulary. Erica Brindley (2015) supports Sagart's hypothesis, arguing that the radically different Kra-Dai history of migration to the mainland (as opposed to the Philippines for Proto-Austronesian) and extended contact with Austro-Asiatic and Sinitic speakers would make the relationship appear more distant. She also suggests that the presence of only the most basic Austronesian vocabulary in Kra-Dai makes this scenario of relexification more plausible.

Besides various concrete pieces of evidence for a Kra–Dai existence in present-day Guangdong, remnants of Kra–Dai languages spoken further north can be found in unearthed inscriptional materials and non-Han substrata in Min and Wu Chinese.

Wolfgang Behr (2002, 2006, 2009, 2017) points out that most non-Sinitic words found in Chu inscriptional materials are of Kra–Dai origin. For example, the Chu graph for 'one, once' written as (? < OC *nnəŋ) in the E jun qijie 鄂君啟筯 bronze tally and in Warring States bamboo inscriptions, which represents a Kra–Dai areal word; compare Proto-Tai *hnïŋ = *hnɯŋ (Siamese ^{22}nɯŋ, Dai ^{33}nɯŋ, Longzhou nəəŋ^{A} etc.) 'one, once'.

In the early 1980s, Wei Qingwen (韦庆稳), a Zhuang linguist, proposed that the Old Yue language recorded in the Song of the Yue Boatman is in fact a language ancestral to Zhuang. Wei used reconstructed Old Chinese for the characters and discovered that the resulting vocabulary showed strong resemblance to modern Zhuang. Later, Zhengzhang Shangfang (1991) followed Wei's proposal but used Thai script for comparison, since this orthography dates from the 13th century and preserves archaisms not found in modern pronunciation. Zhengzhang notes that 'evening, night, dark' bears the C tone in Wuming Zhuang xam^{C2} and ɣam^{C2} 'night'. The item raa normally means 'we (inclusive)' but in some places, e.g., Tai Lue and White Tai, it means 'I'. However, Laurent Sagart criticizes Zhengzhang's interpretation as anachronistic, because however archaic the Thai script is, the Thai language was only written 2,000 years after the song had been recorded; even if Proto-Kam–Tai had emerged by the 6th century BCE, its pronunciation would have been substantially different from Thai.

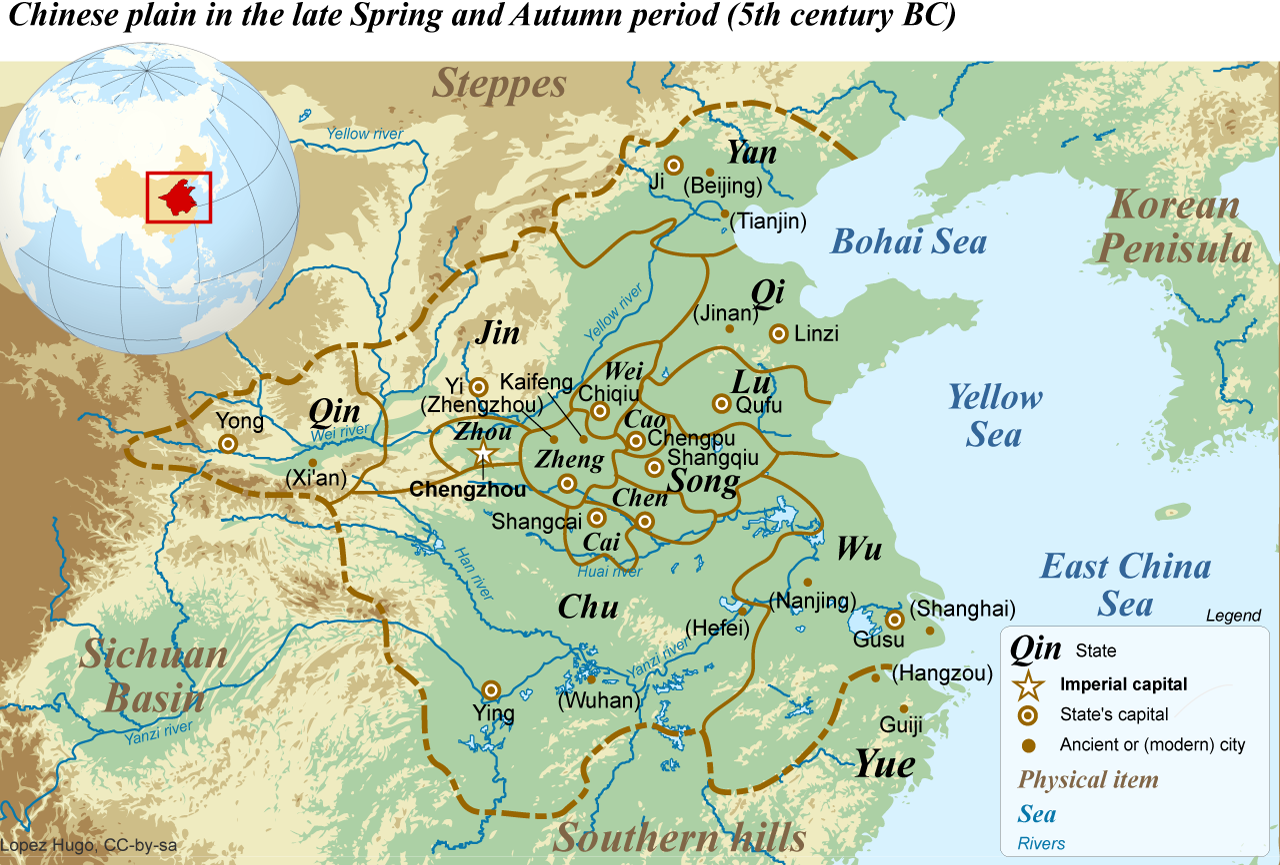
Map of the Chinese plain at the start of the Warring States Period, in the 5th century BC.

== Internal classification ==
Example of the divergence among the Kra-Dai languages, using the word for "tooth".

Kra–Dai consists of at least five well-established branches, namely Kra, Kam–Sui, Tai, Be, and Hlai (Ostapirat 2005:109).

Tai
southern China and Southeast Asia
Kra
southern China, northern Vietnam; called Kadai in Ethnologue and Geyang (仡央) in Chinese
Kam–Sui
Guizhou and Guangxi, China
Be
Hainan; possibly also includes Jizhao of Guangdong
Hlai
Hainan

Chinese linguists have also proposed a Kam–Tai group that includes Kam–Sui, Tai, and Be.

Kra–Dai languages that are not securely classified and may constitute independent Kra–Dai branches include the following:

- Lakkia and Biao, which may or may not subgroup with each other, are difficult to classify due to aberrant vocabulary but are sometimes classified as sisters of Kam–Sui (Solnit 1988).
- Jiamao of southern Hainan, China, is an aberrant Kra–Dai language traditionally classified as a Hlai language, although Jiamao contains many words of non-Hlai origin.
- Jizhao of Guangdong, China, is currently unclassified within Kra–Dai but appears to be most closely related to Be (Ostapirat 1998).

Kra–Dai languages of mixed origins are:

- Hezhang Buyi: Northern Tai and Kra
- E: Northern Tai and Pinghua Chinese
- Caolan: Northern Tai and Central Tai
- Jiamao: Hlai and other unknown elements (Austroasiatic?)

=== Edmondson and Solnit (1988) ===
An early but influential classification, with the traditional Kam–Tai clade, was Edmondson and Solnit's classification from 1988:

- Kra–Dai
  - Kra (Geyang)
  - Hlai
  - Kam–Tai
      - Lakkia–Biao
      - Kam–Sui
      - Be
      - Tai

This classification is also used by Liang and Zhang (1996), Chamberlain (2016: 38), and Ethnologue, though by 2009 Lakkia was made a third branch of Kam–Tai and Biao was moved into Kam–Sui.

=== Ostapirat (2005); Norquest (2007) ===
Weera Ostapirat (2005:128) suggests the possibility of Kra and Kam–Sui being grouped together as Northern Kra–Dai and Hlai with Tai as Southern Kra–Dai. Norquest (2007) has further updated this classification to include Lakkia and Be. Norquest notes that Lakkia shares some similarities with Kam–Sui, while Be shares some similarities with Tai. Norquest (2007:15) notes that Be shares various similarities with Northern Tai languages in particular. Following Ostapirat, Norquest adopts the name Kra–Dai for the family as a whole. The following tree of Kra–Dai is from Norquest (2007:16):

- Kra–Dai
  - Northern
    - Kra
    - Northeastern
      - Lakkia
      - Kam–Sui
  - Southern
    - Hlai
    - Be–Tai
      - Tai
      - Be

Additionally, Norquest (2007) also proposes a reconstruction for Proto-Southern Kra–Dai.

=== Norquest (2015, 2020) ===
A classification of Kra–Dai by Norquest (2015, 2020) is provided as follows:

- Kra–Dai
  - Kra
  - Eastern Kra–Dai
    - Biao
    - Lakkja–Kam–Tai
      - Lakkja
      - Kam–Tai
        - Kam–Sui
        - Western Kam–Tai
          - Hlai
          - Be–Tai
            - Ong-Be
            - Tai

=== Norquest (2021) ===
Based on shared lexical innovations, Norquest (2021) significantly revised his classification of Kra–Dai. Together, Biao and Lakkja form the most divergent subgroup of Kra–Dai. Be–Tai and Hlai are placed together as part of a "Hlai–Tai" group.

- Kra–Dai
  - Biao–Lakkja
  - Kam–Tai
    - Kam–Sui
    - Kra–Tai
      - Kra
      - Hlai–Tai
        - Hlai
        - Be–Tai
          - Be
          - Tai

== Migration routes of subgroups ==
According to Ostapirat (2026), Be originated from the present-day borderlands of Guangxi, China, and northern Vietnam, while Hlai can be traced back much further, to the southwest from north-central Vietnam. The Be migrated to northern Hainan via the Leizhou Peninsula. Meanwhile, Hlai speakers migrated directly to southern Hainan but not the north, since they followed a migration route that skipped Leizhou. Jiamao also originated from northern Vietnam. Kra languages exhibit contact influence with Hmong-Mien and Austroasiatic, displaying lexical similarities with Khmuic in particular.

== Hypotheses regarding external relationships ==
=== Austro-Tai ===
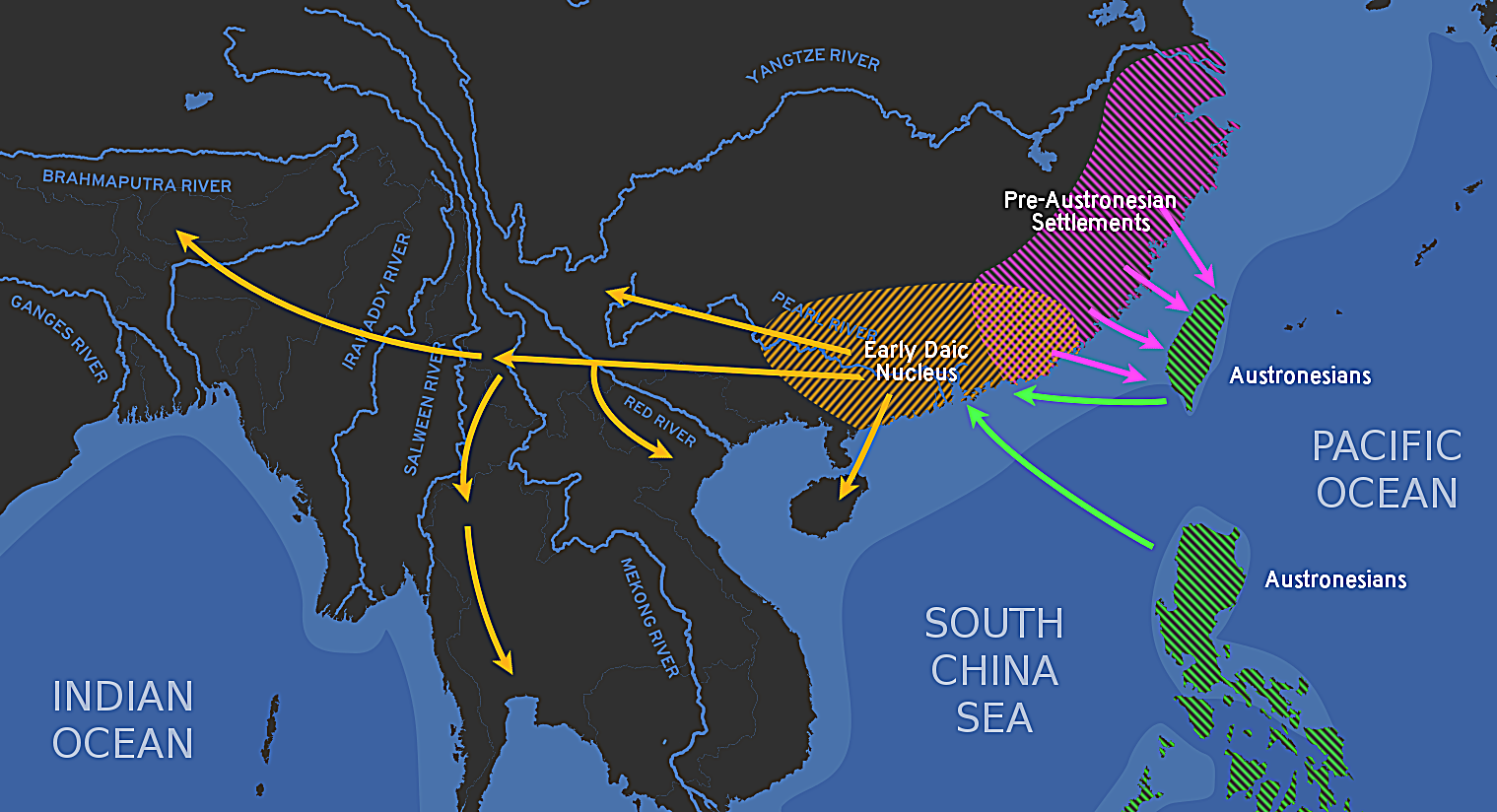
Proposed genesis of Daic languages and their relation to Austronesian languages (Blench, 2018)

Several scholars have presented evidence that Kra–Dai may be related to, or even a branch of, the Austronesian language family. There are a number of possible cognates in the core vocabulary, displaying regular sound correspondences. Among proponents, there is yet no agreement as to whether they are a sister group to Austronesian in a family called Austro-Tai, a back-migration from Taiwan to the mainland or a later migration from the Philippines to Hainan during the Austronesian expansion.

The inclusion of Japanese in the Austro-Tai family, as proposed by Paul K. Benedict in the late 20th century, is not supported by the current proponents of the Austro-Tai hypothesis.

=== Sino-Tai ===
The Kra–Dai languages were formerly considered to be part of the Sino-Tibetan family, partly because they contain large numbers of words that are similar to Sino-Tibetan languages. However, Western scholars generally consider them to be Sinitic loanwords and note that basic vocabulary words in Kra–Dai languages often have cognates with Austronesian instead. Outside China, the Kra–Dai languages are now classified as an independent family. In China, they are called Dong–Tai (侗台) or Zhuang–Dong (壮侗) languages and are generally included, along with the Hmong–Mien languages, in the Sino-Tibetan family.

=== Hmong–Mien ===
Kosaka (2002) has argued specifically for a Miao–Dai family. Based on proposed lexical cognates, he proposes a genetic relation between Hmong–Mien and Kra–Dai languages. He further suggests that similarities between Kra–Dai and Austronesian are due to later areal contact in the coastal areas of eastern and southeastern China or an older ancestral relation (Proto-East Asian).

=== Japonic ===
Vovin (2014) has proposed that the location of the Japonic Urheimat (linguistic homeland) is in southern China. He argues for typological evidence that Proto-Japanese may have been a monosyllabic, SVO syntax and isolating language, which is also characteristic of Kra–Dai languages. According to him, these common features are however not due to a genetic relationship but rather the result of intense contact.

== See also ==
- Austric languages
- Proto-Hlai language
- Proto-Hmong–Mien language
- Proto-Kam–Sui language
- Proto-Kra language
- Proto-Tibeto-Burman language
- Proto-Tai language
- Sino-Austronesian languages

== Sources ==
- Behr, Wolfgang (2017). "The language of the bronze inscriptions". In Shaughnessy, Edward L. (ed.). Kinship: Studies of Recently Discovered Bronze Inscriptions from Ancient China. The Chinese University Press of Hong Kong. pp. 9–32. ISBN 978-9-629-96639-3.
- ——— (2009). "Dialects, diachrony, diglossia or all three? Tomb text glimpses into the language(s) of Chǔ". TTW-3, Zürich, 26.-29.VI.2009, "Genius Loci": 1–48.
- ——— (2006). "Some Chŭ 楚 words in early Chinese literature". EACL-4, Budapest: 1–21.
- ——— (2002). "Stray loanword gleanings from two Ancient Chinese fictional texts". 16e Journées de Linguistique d'Asie Orientale, Centre de Recherches Linguistiques Sur l'Asie Orientale (E.H.E.S.S.), Paris: 1–6.
- Blench, Roger. 2004. Stratification in the peopling of China: how far does the linguistic evidence match genetics and archaeology? Paper for the Symposium "Human migrations in continental East Asia and Taiwan: genetic, linguistic and archaeological evidence". Geneva 10–13 June 2004. Université de Genève.
- Blench, Roger (2017) [2015]. "Origins of Ethnolinguistic Identity in Southeast Asia" (PDF). In Habu, Junko; Lape, Peter; Olsen, John (eds.). Handbook of East and Southeast Asian Archaeology. Springer. ISBN 978-1-493-96521-2.
- Brindley, Erica F. (2015). Ancient China and the Yue. Cambridge University Press. ISBN 978-1-107-08478-0.
- Edmondson, J.A. and D.B. Solnit eds. 1997. Comparative Kadai: the Tai branch. Dallas: Summer Institute of Linguistics and the University of Texas at Arlington. ISBN 0-88312-066-6
- Edmondson, Jerold A. (2007). "The power of language over the past: Tai settlement and Tai linguistics in southern China and northern Vietnam" (PDF). Studies in Southeast Asian Languages and Linguistics, Jimmy G. Harris, Somsonge Burusphat and James E. Harris, ed. Bangkok, Thailand: Ek Phim Thai Co. LTD.: 1–25. Archived from the original (PDF) on 1 January 2014.
- Holm, David (2014). "A Layer of Old Chinese Readings in the Traditional Zhuang Script". Bulletin of the Museum of Far Eastern Antiquities. 79: 1–45.
- ——— (2013). Mapping the Old Zhuang Character Script: A Vernacular Writing System from Southern China. BRILL. ISBN 978-9-004-22369-1.
- Li, Hui (2001). "Daic Background Vocabulary in Shanghai Maqiao Dialect" (PDF). Proceedings for Conference of Minority Cultures in Hainan and Taiwan, Haikou: Research Society for Chinese National History: 15–26. Archived from the original (PDF) on 27 March 2018.
- Ostapirat, Weera (2013). "Austro-Tai revisited" (PDF). Plenary Session 2: Going Beyond History: Reassessing Genetic Grouping in SEA the 23rd Annual Meeting of the Southeast Asian Linguistics Society, May 29–31, 2013, Chulalongkorn University: 1–10.
- Sagart, Laurent (2008). "The expansion of Setaria farmers in East Asia". In Sanchez-Mazas, Alicia; Blench, Roger; Ross, Malcolm D.; Peiros, Ilia; Lin, Marie (eds.). Past Human Migrations in East Asia: Matching Archaeology, Linguistics and Genetics (Routledge Studies in the Early History of Asia) 1st Edition. Routledge. pp. 133–157. ISBN 978-0-415-39923-4.
- Zhengzhang, Shangfang (1991). "Decipherment of Yue-Ren-Ge (Song of the Yue boatman)". Cahiers de Linguistique Asie Orientale. 20 (2): 159–168. doi:10.3406/clao.1991.1345.
