= Be languages =

Kra–Dai languages spoken in China

Be
- Lingao
- Native to: China
- Region: Hainan
- Native speakers: (600,000 cited 2000)
- Language family: Kra–Dai: Kam–Tai?; Be–Tai?; Be–Jizhao?; Be

Language codes
- ISO 639-3: onb
- Glottolog: ling1270
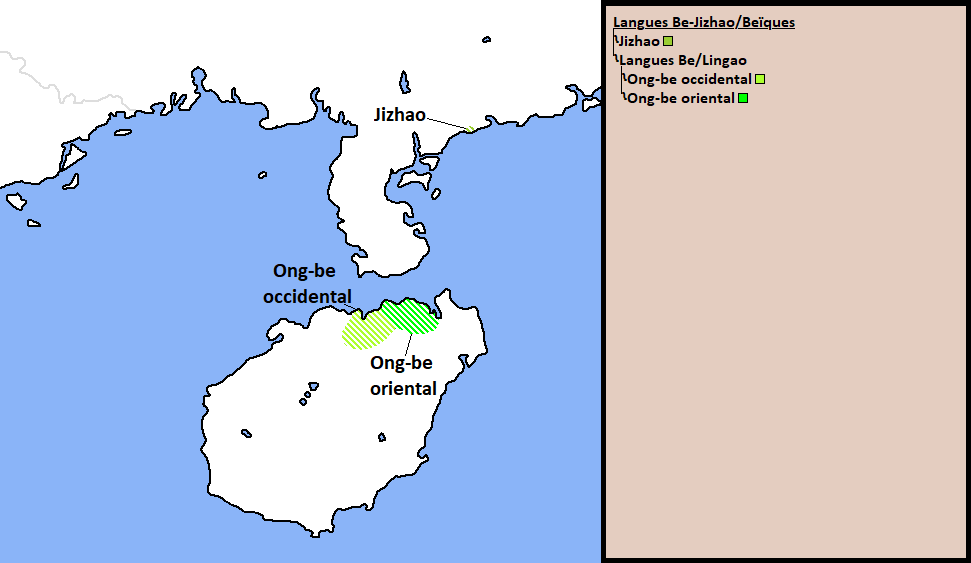

Be (native pronunciation: [ʔɑŋ˧ɓe˧]), also known as Ong Be, Bê, or Vo Limgao (Chinese: 臨高話; pinyin: Lín'gāohuà), is a pair of languages spoken by 600,000 people, 100,000 of them monolingual, on the north-central coast of Hainan Island, including the suburbs of the provincial capital Haikou. The speakers are counted as part of the Han Chinese nationality in census. According to Ethnologue, it is taught in primary schools.

== Names ==
Be speakers refer to themselves as ʔaŋ³³vo³³, with ʔaŋ³³ being the prefix for persons and vo³³ meaning 'village'. Liang (1997) notes that it is similar to the autonym ŋaːu¹¹fɔːn¹¹ (from ŋaːu¹¹ 'person' and fɔːn¹¹ 'village'), by which Gelong 仡隆 (Cun language) speakers refer to themselves.

== Classification ==
The Be languages are a pair of Kra–Dai languages, but its precise relationship to other branches within the Kra-Dai family has yet not been conclusively determined. Hansell (1988) considers Be to be a sister of the Tai branch based on shared vocabulary, and proposes a Be–Tai grouping.

Based on toponymic evidence from place names with the prefix dya- (调 diao), Jinfang Li considers Be to have originated from the Leizhou peninsula of Guangdong province. Liang (1997:16) considers Be to have migrated to Hainan from the Leizhou Peninsula of Guangdong about 2,500 years ago during the Warring States Period, but not over 3,000 years ago. Liang & Zhang (1996:21–25) also believe that Be had migrated from the Leizhou Peninsula to northern Hainan about 2,500 years ago during the Warring States period.

Weera Ostapirat (1998), analyzing data from Zhang (1992), notes that Be and Jizhao share many lexical similarities and sound correspondences, and that Jizhao may be a remnant Be-related language in China.

According to Ostapirat (2026), Be originated from the present-day borderlands of Guangxi, China and northern Vietnam. The ancestors of Be speakers migrated to northern Hainan via the Leizhou Peninsula.

== Dialects ==
Be consists of the Lincheng (临城, Western) and Qiongshan (琼山, Eastern) dialects. Liang (1997:32) documents the following varieties of Be.

- Lingao County, including Lincheng (临城镇) and Xinying (新盈镇) towns
- Bailian (白莲), Chengmai County
- Longtang Township (龙塘镇), Qiongshan District

Be of Chengmai is intermediate between the Lincheng and Qiongshan dialects, and has features of both.

Chen (2018) contains extensive comparative lexical data for the Be dialects of Changliu (长流), Yongxing (永兴), Longtang (龙塘), Qiaotou (桥头), Huangtong (皇桐), and Xinying (新盈). The Qiaotou, Huangtong, and Xinying dialects are unintelligible with the Changliu, Yongxing, Longtang, and Shishan (石山) dialects. Chen (2018) also reconstructs Proto-Ong-Be on the basis of this comparative lexical data.

=== Classification ===
Chen (2018: 82) classifies the Ong-Be dialects into two groups, which are mutually unintelligible with each other.

- Ong-Be
  - Western Ong-Be
    - Qiaotou 桥头
    - Huangtong 皇桐
    - Maniao 马袅
    - Lincheng 临城
    - Jialai 加来
    - Meiliang 美良
    - Xinying 新盈
  - Eastern Ong-Be
    - Longtang 龙塘
    - Longqiao 龙桥
    - Longquan 龙泉 (formerly Shizilu 十字路)
    - Yongxing 永兴
    - Shishan 石山
    - Changliu 长流
    - Laocheng 老城

Schmitz (2024) suggests three dialects:

- Ong-Be (Lingao)
  - Lingao County Lingao
    - Bohou 博厚
    - Jialai 加来
    - Lincheng 临城
  - Chengmai County Lingao
  - Haikou City Lingao

== Phonology ==
=== Consonants ===
==== Initials ====
Be consonant initials
		Labial	Alveolar	(Alveolo-) palatal	Velar	Glottal
Plosive	voiceless	(p)	t		k	ʔ
Plosive	glottalized	ʔb	ʔd			
Affricate			ts			
Fricative	voiceless	f	s	(ɕ)	x	h
Fricative	voiced	v				
Nasal		m	n	ȵ	ŋ	
Approximant			l	j		

- [p] is mainly heard in finals, rarely in initials.
- /s/ can also be heard as [ɕ] in free variation.
- /f/ can be heard as [pʰ] in the dialect of Xindengyi.

==== Finals ====
Be consonant finals
	Labial	Alveolar	Velar	Glottal
Plosive	p	t	k	ʔ
Nasal	m	n	ŋ	

=== Vowels ===
Be vowels
	Front	Central	Back
High	i		u
Mid	e	ə	o
Mid	(ɛ)	(ɐ)	ɔ
Low	a		

- Vowels in word-initial position are phonetically heard beginning with a glottal [ʔ].
- An open-mid vowel [ɛ] occurs in the Chengmai and Qiongshan dialects.
- A near-open central vowel sound [ɐ] also occurs in the Qiongshan dialect.

== See also ==
- List of Proto-Ong-Be reconstructions (Wiktionary)

== Works cited ==
- Liang, Min 梁敏 (1997). Língāo yǔ yánjiū 临高语研究 [A Study of Lingao] (in Chinese). Shanghai: Shanghai yuandong chubanshe 上海远东出版社.
- Chen, Yen-ling (2018). Proto-Ong-Be (PDF) (Ph.D. dissertation). University of Hawaii at Manoa. Archived from the original (PDF) on 2023-06-05.
- Schmitz, Timo. 2024. Family Tree: Tai-Kadai Languages.
