= International Conference on Sino-Tibetan Languages and Linguistics =

Annual academic conference

International Conference on Sino-Tibetan Linguistics (ICSTLL)
- Status: Active
- Frequency: Annual
- Years active: 1968–present
- People: James A. Matisoff, et al.
- Website: Main webpage

The International Conference on Sino-Tibetan Languages and Linguistics (ICSTLL) is an annual academic conference that focuses on research in Sino-Tibetan languages and linguistics, as well as the Hmong–Mien, Kra–Dai, and Austroasiatic languages. The conference has been held annually since 1968.

== List of meetings ==
A full list of meetings, including full conferences, workshops, and other meetings, is as follows.

No.	Date	Institutional host(s)	Location	Country	Committee
1	October 1968	Yale University	New Haven, Connecticut	United States	Hugh Stimson, Roy Andrew Miller, Samuel Martin
2	October 1969	Columbia University	New York City	United States	Robert Austerlitz, James A. Matisoff
3	October 1970	Cornell University	Ithaca, New York	United States	Nicholas Bodman
4	October 1971	Indiana University	Bloomington, Indiana	United States	LaRaw Maran
5	October 1972	University of Michigan	Ann Arbor, Michigan	United States	Alton Becker, William J. Gedney
6	October 1973	University of California, Berkeley	San Diego	United States	Benjamin K. T'sou
7	October 1974	Georgia State University	Atlanta	United States	William L. Ballard
8	October 1975	University of California, Berkeley	Berkeley, California	United States	James A. Matisoff
9	October 1976	Scandinavian Institute of Asian Studies	Copenhagen	Denmark	Søren Egerod, Inga-Lill Hansson
10	October 1977	Georgetown University	Washington, D.C.	United States	Paul Fu-Mien Yang
11	October 1978	University of Arizona	Tucson, Arizona	United States	Timothy Light
12	October 1979	École Normale Supérieure	Paris	France	Alexis Rygaloff, Martine Mazaudon, Viviane Alleton
13	October 1980	University of Virginia	Charlottesville, Virginia	United States	Gilbert Roy
14	October 1981	University of Florida	Gainesville, Florida	United States	Chauncey C. Chu
15	August 1982	Peking University	Beijing	China	Lü Shuxiang
16	September 1983	University of Washington	Seattle	United States	Jerry L. Norman, Marjorie K.M. Chan
17	September 1984	University of Oregon	Eugene, Oregon	United States	Scott DeLancey
18	August 1985	Mahidol University; Ramkhamhaeng University	Bangkok	Thailand	Suriya Ratanakul, Udom Warotamasikkhadit
19	September 1986	Ohio State University	Columbus, Ohio	United States	Timothy Light, Feng-sheng Hsueh
20	August 1987	University of British Columbia	Vancouver	Canada	Edwin G. Pulleyblank
21	October 1988	University of Lund	Lund	Sweden	Inga-Lill Hansson, Jan-Olof Svantesson, Kristina Lindell
22	October 1989	University of Hawaiʻi	Manoa, Hawaii	United States	Li Ying-che, Anatole Lyovin
23	October 1990	University of Texas	Arlington, Texas	United States	Jerold A. Edmondson
24	October 1991	Ramkhamhaeng University; Chiang Mai University	Bangkok; Chiang Mai	Thailand	Udom Warotamasikkhadit
25	October 1992	University of California, Berkeley	Berkeley, California	United States	James A. Matisoff
26	September 1993	National Museum of Ethnology	Osaka	Japan	Yasuhiko Nagano
27	October 1994	Centre National de la Recherche Scientifique	Sèvres/Paris	France	Martine Mazaudon, Boyd Michailovsky
28	October 1995	University of Virginia	Charlottesville, Virginia	United States	Gilbert Roy
29	October 1996	Leiden University	Leiden	Netherlands	George van Driem
30	August 1997	Minzu University	Beijing	China	Sun Hongkai, Dai Qingxia
31	October 1998	University of Lund	Lund	Sweden	Inga-Lill Hansson
32	October 1999	University of Illinois	Champaign–Urbana, Illinois	United States	F. K. Lehman
33	October 2000	Ramkhamhaeng University	Bangkok	Thailand	Udom Warotamasikkhadit
34	October 2001	Yunnan Institute for Nationalities; Nankai University	Kunming	China	Zhao Jiawen, Shi Feng
35	November 2002	Arizona State University	Tempe, Arizona	United States	Karen Adams, Thomas Hudak
36	November 2003	La Trobe University	Melbourne	Australia	David Bradley
37	October 2004	Lund University	Lund	Sweden	Inga-Lill Hansson
38	October 2005	Xiamen University	Xiamen	China	Li Rulong
39	September 2006	University of Washington	Seattle	United States	Zev J. Handel
40	September 2007	Heilongjiang University	Harbin	China	Dai Zhaoming
41	September 2008	School of Oriental and African Studies (SOAS), University of London	London	United Kingdom	Justin Watkins
42	November 2009	Payap University / SIL International	Chiang Mai	Thailand	Larin Adams
43	October 2010	Lund University	Lund	Sweden	Inga-Lill Hansson
44	October 2011	Central Institute of Indian Languages	Mysore	India	G. Devi Prasada Sastry
45	October 2012	Nanyang Technological University	Singapore	Singapore	Alexander R. Coupe
46	August 2013	Dartmouth College	Hanover, New Hampshire	United States	David A. Peterson
47	October 2014	Yunnan Normal University	Kunming	China	Yu Jinzhi, Tian Qianzi, Chen E.
48	August 2015	University of California, Berkeley	Santa Barbara, California	United States	Carol Genetti
49	November 2016	Jinan University	Guangzhou	China	Fan Junjun
50	November 2017	Chinese Academy of Social Sciences	Beijing	China	Yin Hubin, Huang Chenglong
51	September 2018	Kyoto University	Kyoto	Japan	Keisuke Huziwara
52	June 2019	The University of Sydney	Sydney	Australia	Gwendolyn Hyslop, Mark W. Post, Yankee Modi
53	October 2020	University of North Texas	Denton, Texas	United States	Shobhana Chelliah
54	October 2021	Southwest Jiaotong University	Chengdu	China	Elvis Huang, Ziwo Lama
55	September 2022	Kyoto University	Kyoto	Japan	Takumi Ikeda, Norihiko Hayashi
56	October 2023	Chulalongkorn University	Bangkok	Thailand	Pittayawat Pittayaporn
57	October 2024	Peking University	Beijing	China	Jiangping Kong, You-Jing Lin, Xiyu Wu, Yao Lu, Jie Yang
58	September 2025	University of Bern	Bern	Switzerland	Linda Konnerth et al.
58	December 2026	Nagaland University (Kohima Campus)	Meriema, Kohima district	India	Mimi Kevichüsa Ezung et al.

== See also ==
- List of linguistics conferences
- Sino-Tibetan Etymological Dictionary and Thesaurus
