= Proto-Tibeto-Burman language =

Reconstructed ancestor of the Tibeto-Burman languages

Proto-Tibeto-Burman
- PTB
- (may be equivalent to Proto-Sino-Tibetan)
- Reconstruction of: Tibeto-Burman languages
- Reconstructed ancestor: Proto-Sino-Tibetan
- Lower-order reconstructions: Proto-Loloish; Proto-Karenic; Proto Tani

Proto-Tibeto-Burman (commonly abbreviated PTB) is the reconstructed ancestor of the Tibeto-Burman languages, that is, the Sino-Tibetan languages, except for Chinese. An initial reconstruction was produced by Paul K. Benedict and since refined by James Matisoff. Several other researchers argue that the Tibeto-Burman languages sans Chinese do not constitute a monophyletic group within Sino-Tibetan, and therefore that Proto-Tibeto-Burman was the same language as Proto-Sino-Tibetan.

== Issues ==
Reconstruction is complicated by the immense diversity of the languages, many of which are poorly described, the lack of inflection in most of the languages, and millennia of intense contact with other Sino-Tibetan languages and languages of other families. Only a few subgroups, such as Lolo-Burmese, have been securely reconstructed. Benedict's method, which he dubbed "teleo-reconstruction", was to compare widely separated languages, with a particular emphasis on Classical Tibetan, Jingpho, Written Burmese, Garo, and Mizo. Although the initial consonants of cognates tend to have the same place and manner of articulation, voicing and aspiration are often unpredictable. Matisoff attributes this to the effects of prefixes that have been lost and are often unrecoverable. The reconstruction also features "allofams", variant forms of a root postulated to explain inconsistent reflexes in daughter languages. The reconstruction of such "allofams" has been heavily criticized by other researchers in the field.

== Homeland ==
Contrary to other hypotheses suggesting a Proto-Sino-Tibetan homeland in the Yellow River valley of northern China, Matisoff (1991, 2015) suggests that the Proto-Sino-Tibetan (PST) homeland was located "somewhere on the Himalayan plateau," and gives Proto-Tibeto-Burman a date of approximately 4000 B.C., which is roughly on a par with the age of Proto-Indo-European. Language diversification occurred as speakers then moved downstream through various river valleys.

== Phonology ==
The phonology of Proto-Tibeto-Burman here is from Matisoff's 2003 reconstruction, much of which is based on Benedict's earlier reconstructions.

=== Consonants ===
Proto-Tibetan–Burman has at least 23 consonants (Matisoff 2003:15). Some descendants of Proto-Tibetan–Burman, especially the Qiangic languages, have developed dozens of sibilant fricatives and affricates.

Proto-Tibeto-Burman consonants
	Labial	Alveolar	Palatalized alveolar	Palatal	Velar	Glottal
Nasal	m	n			ŋ	
Stop	p, b	t, d			k, g	
Affricate		ts, dz	tś, dź			
Fricative		s, z	ś, ź			h
Tap or trill		ɾ, r				
Approximant	w	l		j		

According to Matisoff, Proto-Tibeto-Burman also has many final nasals, stops, and liquids.

=== Vowels ===
In Matisoff's reconstruction, Proto-Tibeto-Burman vowels can be split into primary and secondary sets. Modern-day Tibeto-Burman languages have anywhere from five vowels (Written Tibetan and Jingpho) to dozens of monophthongs and diphthongs (Loloish and Qiangic languages) (Matisoff 2003:157). Matisoff (2003) also notes that languages which have greatly simplified or eliminated final consonants tend to have more vowels. The open front unrounded vowel *a is by far the most common and stable vowel in Tibeto-Burman languages.

Matisoff (2003) reinterprets diphthongs from Paul Benedict's reconstruction as long vowels.

Proto-Tibeto-Burman primary vowels
Height	Front	Central	Back
Close	ī (iy, əy)		ū (uw, əw)
Mid	ē (ey)	(-ə)	ō (ow)
Open		a	
Open	ay		aw
Open	āy		āw

Proto-Tibeto-Burman secondary vowels
Height	Front	Back
Close	ī	ū
Mid	ē	ō

=== Preservation of stops ===
According to Matisoff, Sino-Tibetan languages go through a series of four stages in which final stops and nasals gradually decay (Matisoff 2003:238-239).

1. The six final stops and nasals, *-p, *-t, *-k, *-m, *-n, *-ŋ, are all intact. Written Tibetan, Lepcha, Kanauri, Garo, and Cantonese are currently on this stage.
2. One or more final consonants have been reduced or dropped. In Jingpho and Nung, the velars (*-k) are replaced by glottal stops (-ʔ), while in other languages they are completely dropped. In Mandarin Chinese, all final stops are dropped, and *-m has merged with *-n.
3. All finals stops become glottal stops or constrictions (such as creaky voices), and final nasals may be replaced by nasality in the preceding consonant. Languages currently in this stage include modern Burmese and Lahu.
4. There are no glottal or nasal traces of the former final consonants left in the syllables.

== Syntax ==
Proto-Tibeto-Burman was a verb-final (subject–object–verb or SOV) language.

Most modern-day Tibeto-Burman branches also display SOV word order. However, due to syntactic convergence within the Mainland Southeast Asia linguistic area, three Tibeto-Burman branches, Karenic, Mruic, and Bai, display SVO (verb-medial) word order. This syntactic realignment has also occurred in Sinitic, which Scott DeLancey (2011) argues to be a result of creolization through intensive language contact and multilingualism during the Zhou dynasty.

== Morphology ==
=== Syllable structure ===
According to James Matisoff, Proto-Tibeto-Burman syllables typically consist of the following structure (Matisoff 2003:11-13).

(P_{2}) — (P_{1}) — C_{i} — (G) — V(:) — C_{f} — (s)

- P_{1}: first prefix - optional
- P_{2}: second prefix - optional
- C_{i}: initial consonant
- G: glide - optional
- V: vowel (optionally lengthened)
- C_{f}: final consonant
- s: suffix - optional

The following types of changes in syllable structure have been attested in Tibeto-Burman languages (Matisoff 2003:155). (Note: Sesquisyllable, otherwise known as a minor syllable, is a word coined by James Matisoff meaning "one-and-a-half syllables.")

- disyllable
  - disyllable → sesquisyllable
  - disyllable → complex monosyllable
  - disyllable → simple monosyllable
- sesquisyllable
  - sesquisyllable → disyllable
  - sesquisyllable → complex monosyllable
  - sesquisyllable → simple monosyllable
- complex monosyllable
  - complex monosyllable → sesquisyllable
  - complex monosyllable → simple monosyllable
- simple monosyllable
  - simple monosyllable → disyllable

Below are the sources of the syllable changes (i.e., reversal of the list above).

- disyllable
  - from sesquisyllable
  - from simple monosyllable
- sesquisyllable
  - from disyllable
  - from complex monosyllable
- complex monosyllable
  - from disyllable
  - from sesquisyllable
- simple monosyllable
  - from disyllable
  - from sesquisyllable
  - from complex monosyllable

However, Roger Blench (2019) argues that Proto-Sino-Tibetan did not have sesquisyllabic structure; instead, sesquisyllabicity in present-day Sino-Tibetan branches had been borrowed from Austroasiatic languages due to typological convergence.

=== Verbs ===
According to many authors such as James Bauman, George van Driem and Scott DeLancey, a system of verbal agreement should be reconstructed for proto-Tibeto-Burman. Verbal agreement has disappeared in Chinese, Tibetan, Lolo-Burmese and most other branches, but was preserved in Kiranti languages in particular. This is a topic of scholarly debate, however, and the existence of a PTB verbal agreement system is disputed by such authors as Randy LaPolla.

=== Prefixes ===
Matisoff postulates the following derivational prefixes.

- *s- — This prefix is used for the directive, causative, or intensive. It also appears in words for animals and body parts.
- *ʔa- / *(ʔ)ə / *ʔə̃ / *ʔaŋ / *ʔak — This glottal prefix is used for kinship functions and the third person possessive.
- *m- — Before verb roots, this prefix signifies inner-directed states or actions, such as stativity, intransitivity, durativity, and reflexivity. Before noun roots, it is used as a third person possessive prefix.
- *r- — Before verbs, this prefix is used as a "directive." It is also used before a wide variety of semantically unrelated noun roots.
- *b- — This prefix is often used before transitive verbs, and usually marks the past (with suffix *-s, creating a *b- -s circumfix) and future (with a null suffix).
- *g- — This velar prefix has a third person pronominal function before noun roots. It is also used before a wide variety of semantically unrelated noun roots. Before verb roots, it is used for the present and future tenses. In Proto-Lolo–Burmese, the unvoiced velar prefix *k- is used commonly used before animal names.

Other constructed prefixes include *l- and *d-.

=== Circumfixes ===
Circumfixes have also been reconstructed for Proto-Tibeto-Burman.

In Written Tibetan, s- -n and s- -d are collective circumfixes used in kinship terms (Matisoff 2003:453).

=== Suffixes ===
According to Matisoff, three Proto-Tibeto-Burman dental suffixes, *-n, *-t, and *-s, are highly widespread, but their semantics are difficult to reconstruct (Matisoff 2003:439). The suffixes *-s, *-h, and *-ʔ are often developed into tones in many Tibeto-Burman languages, and are thus highly "tonogenetically potent" (Matisoff 2003:474).

- *-n – This suffix has a variety of functions, including nominalizing, transitivizing, and collectivizing (or pluralizing). The nominalizing function is attested in Lepcha as -m or -n and in Written Tibetan as -n. The transitivizing form is rare, and has only been attested in Kanauri. Finally, the collectivizing/pluralizing function is found not only in many modern-day Tibeto-Burman languages but also in Old Chinese as well.
- *-t – This suffix is used as a nominalizer. It occurs in Jingpho as -t and Written Tibetan as -d. Other functions include verbalizing noun roots and making intransitive or stative verbs into transitive or causative ones (Matisoff 2003:457). In other cases, *-t appears to have no obvious function. The *-t suffix also occurs in Old Chinese, but its semantic function is unclear.
- *-s – Not easily distinguishable from *-t, this proto-suffix is preserved in written Tibetan, West Himalayish languages, Chepang, Kuki-Chin languages (as -ʔ) and some Qiangic languages. It can serve as a nominalizer (Qiang and Tibetan), locative, subordinator (Kuki-Chin languages), a stative, inner-directed, or "middle" meaning (Himalayish languages such as Kanauri), and causative (Kiranti and Kuki-Chin languages).
- *-k – This velar suffix occurs in the Kukish languages and also in Old Chinese. Its semantic function is still unknown. However, Pulleyblank assigns a distributive sense to the *-k suffix, but only in relation to pronominal forms (LaPolla 2003:26).
- *ʔay – This proto-morpheme means "to go", and can be attached to various roots as a palatal suffix to signify motion away from the deictic center. This fully syllabic proto-morpheme has now been grammaticalized and reduced to palatal offglides in modern-day Tibeto-Burman languages.
- *ya / *za / *tsa / *dza – Meaning "child" or "little one", this proto-morpheme appears in Tibeto-Burman languages as a palatal suffix (-j), and has also been reconstructed in several ways. Its purpose is mainly diminutive. Matisoff (2003) also notes that high front vowels tend to be used for diminutive functions.
- *-way / *-ray – This proto-copula can also appear as a palatal suffix (-j) and occurs in roots carrying abstract grammatical meanings, such as articles, pronouns, and deictics (Matisoff 2003:487).

== Vocabulary ==
Among other researchers, Paul K. Benedict and James Matisoff have proposed reconstructed vocabulary items for Proto-Tibeto-Burman. Matisoff's Proto-Tibeto-Burman reconstruction is by far the most cited, and with his last version published in the final release of the Sino-Tibetan Etymological Dictionary and Thesaurus (2015). Allofams (a term coined by Matisoff to mean alternate proto-forms) are marked using ⪤.

=== Stable roots ===
Matisoff (2009) lists 47 stable Tibeto-Burman roots (i.e., etyma that have cognates widely distributed in branches throughout the family) and their Proto-Tibeto-Burman reconstructions.

- Body parts (10 words): blood; bone; ear; eye; hair (body)/fur/feather; hand; nose; tail; tongue; tooth
- Animals (5 words): animal; dog; fish; pig; snake
- Numerals (6 words): three; four; five; six; eight; hundred
- Natural objects and units of time (5 words): day (of 24 hours); fire; moon; smoke; sun/daytime
- People and habitation (6 words): child/son; grandfather/elder brother; house; husband/male; man/person; name
- Plants and ingestibles (2 words): medicine/juice/paint; poison
- Pronouns (2 words): I (1st person); thou (2nd person)
- Verbs (8 words): bitter; die; dream; eat; ill; kill; lick; steal
- Abstract (3 words): copula; negative; negative imperative

Body parts

- *s-hywəy 'blood' (STEDT #230)
- *s-rus ⪤ *m-rus ⪤ *g-rus 'bone' (STEDT #232)
- *r-na 'ear' (STEDT #811)
- *s-mik ⪤ *s-myak 'eye' (STEDT #33)
- *mil ⪤ *mul 'hair (body)/fur/feather' (STEDT #363)
- *l(y)ak ⪤ *dyak; [*k(r)ut] 'hand' (STEDT #377; #712)
- *may ⪤ *mey ⪤ *mi 'tail' (STEDT #1288)
- *l(y)a ⪤ *lay ⪤ *ley 'tongue' (STEDT #621)
- *g-na 'nose' (STEDT #803)
- *swa; [*džway] 'tooth' (STEDT #632; #635)

Animals

- *sya-n 'animal/meat/flesh' (STEDT #5711, 34)
- *kʷəy 'dog' (STEDT #1764)
- *ŋ(y)a 'fish' (STEDT #1455)
- *pʷak 'pig' (STEDT #1006)
- *s-b-ruːl 'snake/vermin' (STEDT #2623)

Numerals

- *g-sum 'three' (STEDT #2666)
- *b-ləy 'four' (STEDT #2409)
- *b-ŋa ⪤ *l-ŋa 'five' (STEDT #2623)
- *d-k-ruk 'six' (STEDT #2621)
- *b-r-gyat ⪤ *b-g-ryat 'eight' (STEDT #2259)
- *b-r-gya 'hundred' (STEDT #2258)

Natural objects and units of time

- *r(y)ak 'day (24 hours)/spend the night' (STEDT #2636)
- *mey; [*bar ⪤ *par] 'fire' (STEDT #2136; #2152)
- *s-la ⪤ *g-la 'moon/month' (STEDT #1016)
- *kəw ⪤ *kun ⪤ *kut 'smoke' (STEDT #2361)
- *nəy 'sun/daytime' (STEDT #85)

People and habitation

- *tsa ⪤ *za 'child/son' (STEDT #2727)
- *bəw ⪤ *pəw 'grandfather/elder brother' (STEDT #2582)
- *k-yim ⪤ *k-yum 'house' (STEDT #1612)
- *pʷa 'husband/male' (STEDT #1612)
- *r-mi(y) 'human/person' (STEDT #1002)
- *r-miŋ; [*s-braŋ] 'name' (STEDT #2450; #2169)

Plants and ingestibles

- *tsəy; [*s-man] 'medicine/paint/juice' (STEDT #5427; #5434)
- *duk ⪤ *tuk 'poison' (STEDT #2530)

Pronouns

- *ŋa-y; [*ka-y] '1st person' (STEDT #2530)
- *naŋ ⪤ *na '2nd person' (STEDT #2489)

Verbs

- *ka-n 'bitter' (STEDT #229)
- *səy 'die' (STEDT #27)
- *r-maŋ 'dream' (STEDT #126)
- *dzya 'eat' (STEDT #36)
- *na ⪤ *nan ⪤ *nat 'ill' (STEDT #160)
- *g-sat 'kill' (STEDT #1018)
- *m-lyak; *s-lyam 'lick/tongue' (STEDT #629)
- *r-kəw 'steal' (STEDT #2365)

Abstract

- *way ⪤ *ray 'copula' (STEDT #1821)
- *ma 'negative' (STEDT #2436)
- *ta ⪤ *da 'negative imperative' (STEDT #2681)

== Reconstructed branches ==
Proto-language reconstructions for Tibeto-Burman branches include:

- Proto-TGTM (Mazaudon 1994) (list)
- Proto-Tibetic (Tournadre 2014) (list)
- Proto-Western Tibetan (Backstrom 1994) (list)
- Proto-Kiranti (Michailovsky 1991; Opgenort 2011; Jacques 2017) (list 1, list 2, list 3)
- Proto-West Himalayish (several proto-forms reconstructed by Widmer 2014, 2017) (list)
- Proto-Dura (several proto-forms reconstructed by Schorer 2016) (list)
- Proto-Himalayish [ancestral proto-language of Kiranti, Magar, and Kham] (Watters 2002)
- Proto-Kham (Watters 2002) (list)
- Proto-Siangic (Post & Blench 2011) (list)
- Proto-Puroik (Lieberherr 2015) (list)
- Proto-Hrusish (Bodt & Lieberherr 2015) (list)
- Proto-Tani (Sun 1993) (list)
- Proto-East Bodish (Hyslop 2014) (list)
- Proto-Central Naga [Ao] (Bruhn 2014) (list)
- Proto-Tangkhulic (Mortensen 2012) (list)
- Proto-Kuki-Chin (VanBik 2009) (list)
- Proto-Bodo–Garo (Joseph & Burling 2006; Wood 2008) (list)
- Proto-Northern Naga [Konyak] (French 1983) (list)
- Proto-Luish (Huziwara 2012; Matisoff 2013) (list)
- Proto-Karenic (Jones 1961; Luangthongkum 2013, 2019) (list)
- Proto-Rma (Sims 2017) (list)
- Proto-Prinmi (Sims 2017) (list)
- Proto-Ersuic (Yu 2012) (list)
- Proto-Naish (Jacques & Michaud 2011) (list)
- Proto-Lolo-Burmese (Matisoff 2003) (list)
- Proto-Loloish (Bradley 1979) (list)
- Proto-Bai (Wang 2006) (list)
- Proto-Tujia (Zhou 2020) (list)

== See also ==
- List of Proto-Tibeto-Burman reconstructions (Wiktionary)
- Vocabulary lists of Mainland Southeast Asian languages (Wiktionary)
- Sino-Tibetan Etymological Dictionary and Thesaurus
