= Proto-Sino-Tibetan language =

Reconstructed ancestor of the Sino-Tibetan languages

Proto-Sino-Tibetan
- PST, Proto-Trans-Himalayan
- Reconstruction of: Sino-Tibetan languages
- Era: 7000–5000 BCE
- Lower-order reconstructions: Proto-Sinitic; Proto-Tibeto-Burman

Proto-Sino-Tibetan (PST) is the linguistic reconstruction of the Sino-Tibetan proto-language and the common ancestor of all languages in it, including the Sinitic languages, the Tibetic languages, Yi, Bai, Burmese, Karen, Tangut, and Naga.

While Proto-Sino-Tibetan is commonly considered to have two direct descendants, Proto-Sinitic and Proto-Tibeto-Burman, in recent years several scholars have argued that this was not well-substantiated, and have taken to calling the group "Trans-Himalayan". In this case, Proto-Tibeto-Burman may be considered as equivalent to Proto-Sino-Tibetan if Sinitic is indeed not the first branch to split from Proto-Sino-Tibetan.

Recent research indicates a common origin of the Sino-Tibetan languages near the Cishan, Yangshao and Majiayao cultures.

== Features ==
Proto-Sino-Tibetan is believed to have been an agglutinative language with an elaborate system of morphological markers. Reconstructed features include prefixes such as the causative s-, the intransitive m-, the miscellaneous b-, d-, g-, and r-, suffixes -s, -t, and -n, and a set of conditioning factors that resulted in the development of tone in most languages of the family. The existence of such an elaborate system of inflectional changes in Proto-Sino-Tibetan makes the language distinctive from some of its modern descendants, such as the Sinitic languages, which have mostly or completely become analytic.

Proto-Sino-Tibetan, like Old Chinese, also included numerous consonant clusters, and was not a tonal language. Verbs and nouns were written the same but pronounced differently, which is theorized to have evolved into the tones common in many of Proto-Sino-Tibetan's daughter languages.

== Phonology ==
=== Benedict (1972) ===
Paul K. Benedict (1972) placed a particular emphasis on Old Chinese, Classical Tibetan, Jingpho, Written Burmese, Garo, and Mizo in his discussion of Proto-Sino-Tibetan. The table below shows consonant phonemes reconstructed by Benedict.

Consonants	Labial	Dent./Alv.	Post-alv./Pal.	Velar
Nasal	m	n		ŋ
Plosive	p b	t d	c	k g
Fricative		s z	ʒ	h
Approximant	w	l	j	(w)
Rhotic		r		

=== Peiros & Starostin (1996) ===
The reconstruction by Peiros & Starostin suggests a much more complex consonant inventory. The phonemes in brackets are reconstructions that are considered dubious.

Consonants	Labial	Dent./Alv.	Post-alv./Pal.	Velar	Uvular	Laryngeal
Nasal	m	n	ń	ŋ		
Plosive	p b pʰ (bʰ)	t d tʰ (dʰ)		k g kʰ (gʰ)	(q) (ɢ) (qʰ) (ɢʰ)	ʔ
Affricate		c ʒ (ƛ) cʰ (ʒʰ)	ć ʒ́ ćʰ ʒ́ʰ			
Fricative		s	ś	x ɣ	(χ)	
Approximant	w	l	j	(w)		
Rhotic		r				

=== Hill (2019) ===
The following tables show the reconstruction of Proto-Sino-Tibetan phonemes by Nathan Hill (2019).

Consonants		Labial	Coronal	Palatal	Velar	Labiovelar	Uvular	Labiouvular	Glottal
Nasal		*m	*n		*ŋ	*ŋʷ			
Plosive	voiced	*b	*d		*g		*ɢ	*ɢʷ	
Plosive	voiceless	*p	*t		*k	*kʷ	*q		*ʔ
Affricate	voiced		*dz						
Affricate	voiceless		*ts						
Fricatives			*(s) (Note: The sibilant correspondences are simply presented according to their proto-Burmish outcomes, as no patterns could be found by Hill.)						
Approximant			*l	*j (Note: This consonant can only exist as a coda.)					
Rhotic			*r (Note: This phonetic nature of this rhotic is unknown.)						

The consonants /p t k q ʔ m n ŋ l r j/ can take coda position, as well as the cluster /rl/. While Hill does not reconstruct /j/ as an initial consonant due to Baxter and Sagart's Old Chinese reconstruction lacking such a phoneme, he mentions that Jacques and Schuessler suggest a /j/ initial for some Old Chinese words due to potential Tibetan or Rgyalrongic cognates.

Vowels	Front	Central	Back
Close	i		u
Mid	e	ə	o
Open		a	

Hill also claims that his reconstruction is incomplete, as it does not account for Tibetic palatalization, proto-Burmish preglottalization, Sinitic aspirates, and the Sinitic type A and B distinction of syllables.

== Sound changes ==
=== Hill (2019) ===
The sound correspondences cited by Hill (2019) are as follows. Hill bases his correspondences to Old Chinese off of the Baxter-Sagart reconstruction, and thus that reconstruction will be used in the following correspondence tables.

==== Initials ====
Note that many cognate sets with /p t k b d g/ initials between Old Chinese, Tibetan and Burmese agree in every phoneme in a given word except for whether an initial consonant is voiced or not. Jacques explains these discrepancies as at least partially triggered by pre-syllables that were lost or decayed on the way to Chinese, Tibetan and Burmese.

Expected initial correspondences in Hill (2019)
Proto-Sino-Tibetan	Old Chinese	Tibetan	Written Burmese
*p-	*p-	p-	p-
*t-	*t-	t-	t-
*k-	*k-	k-	k-
*kʷ-	*kʷ-	k-	?
*b-	*b-	b-	p-
*d-	*d-	d-	t-
*g-	*g-	g-	g-
*q-	*q-	k(h)-	(lost)
*ɢ-	*ɢ-	g-	?
*ɢʷ-	*ɢʷ-	g-	w-
*ts-	*ts-	ts(h)-	ch-
*dz-	*dz-	(d)z-	c-

==== Vowels ====
Vowel correspondences of vowels in Hill (2019)
Proto-Sino-Tibetan	Old Chinese	Tibetan	Written Burmese
*a	*a	a o (Note: After rounded dorsal consonants.)	a
*e	*e	e i (Note: Before velar consonants.) a (Note: Before dental or liquid consonants.)	a (Note: Before velar, dental or liquid consonants. In Proto-Burmish, pre-velar *i (from *e and *i) were still both distinct from *a.)
*i	*i	i	i
*o	*o	o	wa (Note: o in Old Burmese.)
*u	*u	u	u o (Note: Before velars. Did not merge with inherited *o > Old Burmese o > Written Burmese wa.)
*uw	*u	u	ui uiw (Note: In Old Burmese.)
*ə	*ə	a	a
*əw	*o	u	u
*əj	*əj	a ~ e	i

==== Finals ====
Final correspondences according to Hill (2019)
Proto-Sino-Tibetan	Old Chinese	Tibetan	Written Burmese
*-p	*-p	-b	-p
*-t	*-t	-d	-t
*-k	*-k	-g	-k
*-kə	*-k	(lost) (Note: Except after *a, where this final instead surfaces as -' (transliterated ḫ by Hill).)	(lost)
*-q	*-ʔ	-g	-k
*-ʔ	*-ʔ	(lost)	(lost)
*-m	*-m	-m	-m
*-n	*-n	-n	-n -ñ(ñ) (Note: After *e or *i.)
*-ŋ	*-ŋ	-ng	-ng
*-l	*-j	-l	(lost) (Note: Unless after *u; in this case the final surfaces as -y.)
*-r	*-r	-r	(lost)
*-rl	*-r	-l	(lost)

=== Gong Huangcheng (2003) ===
==== Final consonant changes ====
In Gong Huangcheng's reconstruction of the Proto-Sino-Tibetan language, the finals *-p, *-t, *-k, *-m, *-n, and *-ŋ in Proto-Sino-Tibetan remained in Proto-Sinitic and Proto-Tibeto-Burman. However, in Old Chinese, the finals *-k and *-ŋ that came after the close vowel *-i- underwent an irregular change of *-k＞*-t and *-ŋ ＞*-n. In Proto-Tibeto-Burman, *-kw and *-ŋw underwent a sound change to become *-k and *-ŋ respectively, while in Old Chinese those finals remained until Middle Chinese, where the finals underwent the same sound change.

Furthermore, in Proto-Tibeto-Burman, the finals *-g, *-gw, and *-d underwent the following changes:

1. *-d＞*-y
2. *-gw＞*-w
3. *-g＞*-w when it follows the vowel *-u-
4. *-g＞*-∅ when it follows the vowel *a and *-a-.

==== Example of sound changes ====
===== Voiceless plosive finals =====
	Proto-Sino-Tibetan	Old Chinese (Li Fang-Kuei)	Proto-Tibeto-Burman
*-p	*-jəp	汲 *kjəp	*ka·p
*-p	*-jəp	泣 *khrjəp	*krap
*-p	*-jəp	立 *(g-)rjəp	*g-ryap
*-p	*-jap	接 *tsjap	*tsyap
*-p	*-jup	入 *njəp	*nup~ *nip
*-t	*-iat	八 *priat	*b-r-gyat
*-t	*-iat	殺 *r-siat	*g-sat
*-t	*-uat	脫 *hluat	*g-lwat
*-t	*-jit	一 *·jit	*it
*-k	*-ək	翼 *lək	*lak
*-k	*-jək	織 *tjək	*tak
*-k	*-jək	息 *sjək	*sak
*-k	*-jək	食 *N-ljək	*(m-)lyak
*-k	*-jək	飼 *s-ljəks	*(s-)lyak
*-k	*-ik	節 *tsik＞*tsit	*tsik
*-k	*-ik	縊 *·iks, *·jiks	*ik
*-k	*-jik	蝨 *srjik＞*srjit	*s-rik
*-k	*-juk	曲 *khjuk	*guk~kuk
*-kw	*-əkw	毒 *dəkw	*duk~*tuk
*-kw	*-jəkw	腹 *phjəkw, *bjəkw	*pu·k~*buk
*-kw	*-jəkw	六 *drjəkw	*d-ruk

===== Nasal finals =====
	Proto-Sino-Tibetan	Old Chinese (Li Fang-Kuei)	Proto-Tibeto-Burman
*-m	*-əm	含 *gəm	*gam
*-m	*-əm	頷 *gəm	*gam
*-m	*-jəm	飲 *·jəmx	*am
*-m	*-jəm	尋 *ljəm	*la[·]m
*-m	*-jim	坅 *khjamx “pit”	*kim
*-m	*-um	三 *səm	*g-sum
*-m	*-jum	尋 *ljəm	*lum
*-n	*-an	乾 *kan	*kan
*-n	*-jin	辛 *sjin	*m-sin
*-ng	*-jəng	夢 *mjəngs	*mang
*-ng	*-jəng	蒸 *tjəng	*tang
*-ng	*-jang	紡 *phjangx	*pang
*-ng	*-jang	涼 *grjang	*grang
*-ng	*-jang	迎 *ngrjang	*ngang
*-ng	*-ing	盈 *bling	*bling~pling
*-ng	*-jing	年 *ning＞*nin	*ning
*-ng	*-jing	名 *mjing	*r-ming
*-ng	*-jing	甥 *srjing	*sring
*-ng	*-jing	薪 *sjing＞*sjin	*sing
*-ng	*-jing	仁 *njing＞*njin	*s-ning
*-ngw	*-jəngw	躬 *kjəngw	*gung

===== Voiced plosive finals =====
	Proto-Sino-Tibetan	Old Chinese (Li Fang-Kuei)	Proto-Tibeto-Burman
*-b	*-əb	柔 *njəb＞*njəgw	*nəw
*-d	*-əd	𤈦 *smjədx	*məy
*-d	*-ad	簸 *padx/s	*pwa·y
*-d	*-ad	太 *tads	*tay
*-d	*-ad	蜾 *kwadx	*kwa·y
*-d	*-ad	我 *ngadx	*ngay
*-d	*-ad	移 *lad	*lay
*-d	*-id	四 *sjids	*b-liy
*-d	*-jid	妣 *pjidx	*piy
*-d	*-jid	畀 *sbjids	*biy
*-d	*-jid	几 *krjidx	*kriy
*-d	*-jid	屎 *skhljidx	*kliy
*-d	*-jid	死 *sjidx	*siy
*-g	*-əg	母 *məgx	*ma
*-g	*-jəg	負 *bjəgx	*ba, *bak
*-g	*-jəg	子 *tsjəgx	*tsa
*-g	*-jəg	慈 *dzjəg	*m-dza
*-g	*-jəg	孳 *dzjəgs	*za
*-g	*-jəg	耳 *njəgx	*r-na~*g-na
*-g	*-jəg	牛 *ngwjəg	*ngwa
*-g	*-ag	補 *pagx	*pa
*-g	*-ag	苦 *khagx	*ka
*-g	*-ag	吾 *ngag	*nga
*-g	*-ag	五 *ngagx	*l-nga~*b-nga
*-g	*-ag	狐 *gwag	*gwa
*-g	*-jag	斧 *pjagx	*r-pwa
*-g	*-jag	夫 *pjag	*(p)wa
*-g	*-jag	父 *bjagx	*pa
*-g	*-jag	無 *mjag	*ma
*-g	*-jag	魚 *ngjag	*ngya
*-g	*-jag	咀 *dzjag	*dza
*-g	*-jag	汝 *njagx	*na
*-g	*-ug	口 *khugx	*kuw
*-g	*-ug	寇 *khugs	*r-kuw
*-g	*-jug	霧 *m(r)jugs	*(r-)muw
*-g	*-jug	軀 *khjug	*(s-)kuw
*-g	*-jug	乳 *njugx	*nuw
*-gw	*-əgw	寶 *pəgwx	*puw
*-gw	*-əgw	抱 *bəgwx	*buw
*-gw	*-jəgw	鳩 *kjəgw	*kuw
*-gw	*-jəgw	九 *kjəgwx	*d-kuw
*-gw	*-jəgw	舅 *gjəgwx	*kuw
*-gw	*-agw	豪 *gagw	*m/s-gaw
*-gw	*-agw	號 *gagws	*gaw
*-gw	*-agw	熬 *ngagw	*r-ngaw
*-gw	*-agw	臊 *sagw	*sa·w
*-gw	*-jagw	飄/漂 *phjagw	*pyaw

===== Liquid finals =====
	Proto-Sino-Tibetan	Old Chinese (Li Fang-Kuei)	Proto-Tibeto-Burman
*-l	*-al	肝 *kan	*m-kal
*-l	*-ul	本 *pən	*bul~*pul
*-l	*-jul	銀 *ngjən	*(d)-ngul
*-l	*-jul	閩 *mjən	*s-brul
*-l	*-jal	疲 *brjal	*bal
*-l	*-il	洒 *silx	*(m-)s(y)il
*-r	*-ar	播 *s-bars	*bwar
*-r	*-ar	皤 *bar, *par	*pwa:r
*-r	*-jar	販 *pjans	*par
*-r	*-jar	鮮 *sjan	*sar
*-r	*-uar	酸 *suan	*swa·r
*-r	*-jur	飛 *pjər	*pur~*pir

== Vocabulary ==
Words which do not have reliable Sinitic parallels are accompanied by a (TB).

=== Social terms ===
English	Reconstruction by		Old Chinese (Baxter-Sagart) (Note: For Old Chinese notations in the Baxter–Sagart system: Parentheses "()" indicate uncertain presence; Square brackets "[]" indicate uncertain identity, e.g. *[t] as coda may in fact be *-t or *-p; Angle brackets "<>" indicate infix; Hyphen "-" indicates morpheme boundary; Period "." indicates syllable boundary.)
English	I. Peiros & S. Starostin	J. Matisoff	Old Chinese (Baxter-Sagart)
Person (in general)	*mĭ	*mi	民 *mi[ŋ]
Male	*pă	*pʷa	父 *p(r)aʔ
Female	*mǝw	*mow	母 *mˤoʔ (or məʔ)
Name (of a person)	*miǝŋ	*miŋ	名 *C.meŋ

=== Natural phenomena ===
English	Reconstruction by		Old Chinese (Baxter-Sagart)
English	I. Peiros & S. Starostin	J. Matisoff	Old Chinese (Baxter-Sagart)
Earth	*ƛăy	*ley ~ *lǝy	地 *[l]ˤej-s
Stone	*ƛɨāŋ ~ *ƛɨāk	*luŋ ~ *luk	琭 *[r]ˤok
Sand	*srāy	*sa	沙 *sˤraj
Fire	*mēyH	*mey	火 *[qʷʰ]ˤəjʔ (Note: See also the dialectal 𤈦 /*m̥əjʔ/ and 燬 /*m̥ajʔ/.)
Smoke	*gʰiw	*kǝw	熏 *qʰu[n]
Water	*tujʔ	*t(w)i(y)	水 *s.turʔ
Rain	*(r-)qʰʷăH	*rwa ~ *wa	雨 *C.ɢʷ(r)aʔ
Sun	*nĭy	*nǝy	日 *C.nik
Moon (TB)	*(s-)lăH	*la	N/A (Note: Chinese 月 /*[ŋ]ʷat/ is a descendant of another PST word, *s-ŋʷ(j)a-t.)
Star	*(s-)q(ʰ)ār	*kar	扈 *m-qˤaʔ (Note: Unclear. The more common word is 星 /*s-tsʰˤeŋ/, which is possibly related to 清 /*tsʰeŋ/, in turn from PST *(t)s(j)aŋ.)
Night	*yăH	*ya	夜 *[ɢ]Ak-s
Tree	*sĭŋ	*siŋ ~ *sik	薪 *[s]i[n]
Leaf	*lăp	*lap	葉 *l[a]p
Plant root	*bʰūl	*bul ~ *pul	本 *C.pˤə[n]ʔ

=== Qualitative features of an object ===
English	Reconstruction by		Old Chinese (Baxter-Sagart)
English	I. Peiros & S. Starostin	J. Matisoff	Old Chinese (Baxter-Sagart)
Black, dark (TB)	*nǝk	*nak	黑 *m̥ˤək (Note: It is possible that *s-nak is a descendant of *s-maŋ ~ s-mak (whence OC /*m̥ˤək/).)
White	wār	*hwār	皤 *[b]ˤar (Note: The more commonly used 白 /*bˤrak/ might be a derivation of it.)
Big	*tayH	*tay	大 *lˤa[t]-s
Cold	*(k-)răŋ ~ *(k-)răk	*glak ~ *glaŋ ~ *graŋ	涼 *C.raŋ
Warm	*lɨm	*lim ~ *lum	融 *luŋ
Long (TB)	*rĭŋ	*riŋ	N/A
New	*cʰăr	*sar	鮮 *s[a]r

=== Verb stems ===
English	Reconstruction by		Old Chinese (Baxter-Sagart)
English	I. Peiros & S. Starostin	J. Matisoff	Old Chinese (Baxter-Sagart)
To eat	*ʒʰa	*dzya	咀 *dzaɁ
To drink	*dʰɨn ~ *dʰɨŋ	*daŋ ~ *doŋ	
To bite/chew	*wā	*wa	
To die	*sĭy(H)	*sǝy	死 *sijʔ
To know, to think	*siǝH	*syey	悉 *[s]i[t]
To hear (TB)	*tʰa(s)	*ta	N/A
To sleep	*mĭyH	*mwǝy	寐 *mi[t]-s
To stand	*ryǝp	*r(y)ap	立 *k.rәp
To sit	*tūŋ ~ *tūk	*duŋ ~ *duk ~ *tuŋ ~ *tuk	住 *dro(ʔ)-s
Give	*pĭy	*bǝy	畀 *pi[k]‑s

=== Numbers ===
Number	Reconstruction by		Old Chinese (Baxter-Sagart)	Old Tibetan	Old Burmese
Number	I. Peiros & S. Starostin	J. Matisoff	Old Chinese (Baxter-Sagart)	Old Tibetan	Old Burmese
1	*dyiǝk	*dik ~ *t(y)ik ~ *t(y)ak	一 *ʔi[t], 隻 *tek	gcig	ac, tac
2	*nĭy	*ni	二 *ni[j]-s	gnyis	nhac < *nhik
3	*sɨm	*sum	三 *s.rum	gsum	sumḥ
4	*lĭy	*lǝy	四 *s.li[j]-s	bzhi	liy
5	*ŋāH	*ŋa	五 *C.ŋˤaʔ	lnga	ṅāḥ
6	*rŭk	*ruk	六 *k.ruk	drug	khrok < *khruk
7	*(s-)nĭt	*ni	七 *[tsʰ]i[t]	N/A (Note: Tibetan bdun has unknown origins, likely used to avoid confusion with the similar-sounding "two".)	khu-nac
8	*ryēt	*gyat ~ *ryat ~ *rit	八 *pˤret	brgyad	rhac < rhyat
9	*kwɨH	*gǝw ~ *kǝw	九 *[k]uʔ	dgu	kuiḥ
10	*k(ʰ)ĭp	*g(y)ip	十 *t.[g]әp	N/A (Note: Tibetan bcu is a descendant of another PST root, *tsjaj.)	kip
100	*(p-)ryā	*gya	百 *pˤrak	brgya	ryā

== See also ==
- Proto-Tibeto-Burman language
