= Proto-Loloish language =

Reconstructed ancestor of the Loloish languages

Proto-Loloish
- Reconstruction of: Loloish languages
- Reconstructed ancestor: Proto-Tibeto-Burman

Proto-Loloish is the reconstructed ancestor of the Loloish languages. Reconstructions include those of David Bradley (1979), James Matisoff (2003), and Ziwo Lama (2012).

In later publications, in place of Loloish, David Bradley instead uses the term Ngwi based on a conservative autonym in the Sanie language.

== Li (2011) ==
Li Yongsui (2011) reconstructs Proto-Lolo-Burmese (Proto-Mian-Yi 缅彝) based on 30 languages.

== Lama (2012) ==
Lama (2012) reconstructs 37 consonants for Proto-Loloish (which he calls Proto-Nisoic), 7 of which (marked in green) can occur as syllable finals. The glides /w/ and /j/ occur medially.

Proto-Nisoic consonants (Lama 2012)
		Labial	Dental	Alveolar	Alveolo-palatal	Velar	Glottal
Stops	Voiceless	p	t	ts	tɕ	k	ʔ
Stops	Voiceless aspirated	pʰ	tʰ	tsʰ	tɕʰ	kʰ	h
Stops	Voiced	b	d	dz	dʑ	ɡ	
Stops	Prenasalized	mb	nd	ndz	ndʑ	ŋɡ	
Fricatives	Voiceless			s		x	
Fricatives	Voiced			z	ʑ	ɣ	
Nasals	Voiced	m	n		ɲ	ŋ	
Liquids and Semivowels	Voiced	-w-	l	r	-j-		

- Vowels (8): /i/, /y/, /ɯ/, /u/, /e/, /o/, /ɔ/, /a/
- Tones (5): 1, 2, 3 (unchecked tones), H, L (checked tones)

== References and notes ==
- Bradley, David. 1979. Proto-Loloish. London: Curzon Press. ISBN 978-0-7007-0128-5.
- Lama, Ziwo Qiu-Fuyuan. 2012. Subgrouping Of Nisoic (Yi) Languages: A Study From The Perspectives Of Shared Innovation And Phylogenetic Estimation. Ph.D. dissertation, University of Texas at Arlington.
- Li Yongsui [李永燧]. 2011. Burmo-Yi Phonology [缅彝语音韵学]. Beijing: China Social Sciences Academy Press.
- Matisoff, James. 2003. Handbook of Proto-Tibeto-Burman: System and Philosophy of Sino-Tibetan Reconstruction. University of California publications in linguistics, v. 135. Berkeley: University of California Press. ISBN 978-0-520-09843-5.

== See also ==
- Proto-Tibeto-Burman language
- Lolo-Burmese languages
- Loloish languages
