= LTBA =

LTBA may refer to:

- Linguistics of the Tibeto-Burman Area, an academic journal
- Istanbul Atatürk Airport (ICAO airport code: LTBA)
- Lithium tri-tert-butoxyaluminum hydride (LTBA)
