= Sinosphere (disambiguation) =

The term Sinosphere usually refers to a cultural zone in East Asia and Southeast Asia that has been significantly influenced by Chinese culture.

It may also refer to:

- Sinophone world, the area (mostly East Asia and Southeast Asia) in which Chinese languages are spoken by the majority or a significant number of people
- Sinosphere (linguistics), James Matisoff's name for the Mainland Southeast Asia linguistic area
- Sinocentrism, an ideology that the lands which make up China is the cultural, political, or economic center of the world
- Greater China, a geographical region comprising mainland China, Hong Kong, Macau, and Taiwan

== See also ==
- Little China (ideology), an ideology in which various historical Japanese, Korean, and Vietnamese regimes considered themselves "China" and legitimate inheritors of the Chinese civilization
- Sinophile, one who demonstrates a strong interest and love for Chinese culture or its people
