= Jackson Sun =

Jackson Sun may refer to:

- Jackson Sun (linguist), Taiwanese linguist
- The Jackson Sun, an American newspaper
