= Sino-Tibetan Etymological Dictionary and Thesaurus =

The Sino-Tibetan Etymological Dictionary and Thesaurus
- Author: James A. Matisoff
- Language: English
- Subject: Linguistics
- Publisher: University of California Press
- Publication date: 2015
- Publication place: United States
- Website: stedt.johnblowe.com

The Sino-Tibetan Etymological Dictionary and Thesaurus (commonly abbreviated STEDT) was a linguistics research project hosted at the University of California at Berkeley. The project, which focused on Sino-Tibetan historical linguistics, started in 1987 and lasted until 2015.

James Matisoff was the director of STEDT for nearly three decades.

The Linguistics of the Tibeto-Burman Area journal, now published by Benjamins Pub. Co., was also part of the STEDT project. In addition, the International Conferences on Sino-Tibetan Languages and Linguistics (ICSTLL) were mostly organized by STEDT project members since the 1990s.

== Overview ==
In 1987, James Matisoff began the Sino-Tibetan Etymological Dictionary and Thesaurus (STEDT) project, which aimed to produce an etymological dictionary of Sino-Tibetan languages organized by semantic field. The project maintains a large, publicly accessible lexical database of nearly one million records, with data on Sino-Tibetan languages from over 500 sources. This database is used to identify and mark cognates for the purposes of better understanding the historical development of the Sino-Tibetan language family and the subgroupings of the languages therein, and to reconstruct the theoretical proto-language of the language family. The project was funded by the National Science Foundation (NSF) and the National Endowment for the Humanities (NEH).

== Members ==
Project members were known as "STEDTniks," and included Richard S. Cook, Zev J. Handel, Randy J. LaPolla, David Mortensen, Jackson Tianshin Sun, Jonathan P. Evans, Weera Ostapirat, Graham Thurgood, David Solnit, Kenneth VanBik, John B. Lowe ("J.B. Lowe"), Liberty Lidz, Daniel Bruhn, Dominic Yu, among other linguists.

== Publications ==
Preliminary results from the STEDT project were published in Matisoff's 2003 monograph Handbook of Proto-Tibeto-Burman: System and Philosophy of Sino-Tibetan Reconstruction (HPTB). In 2008, Matisoff published a monograph on Proto-Tibeto-Burman reconstructions for reproductive system vocabulary.

The final release of the Sino-Tibetan Etymological Dictionary and Thesaurus was published in 2015 by Matisoff, with an online version also available.

=== Monographs ===
The STEDT Monograph Series, published by the STEDT project, has 10 books.

- STEDT Monograph 1A: Randy J. LaPolla and John B. Lowe (eds.). Bibliography of the International Conferences on Sino-Tibetan Languages and Linguistics I-XXV.
- STEDT Monograph 2: James A. Matisoff (ed.). Languages and Dialects of Tibeto-Burman. ISBN 0-944613-26-8
- STEDT Monograph 3: Ju Namkung (ed.). Phonological Inventories of Tibeto-Burman Languages. ISBN 0-944613-28-4
- STEDT Monograph 4: David Bradley. Southern Lisu Dictionary. ISBN 0-944613-43-8
- STEDT Monograph 5: Richard S. Cook. Classical Chinese Combinatorics: Derivation of the Book of Changes Hexagram Sequence. ISBN 0-944613-44-6
- STEDT Monograph 6: Paul K. Benedict. Kinship in Southeastern Asia. ISBN 0-944613-45-4
- STEDT Monograph 7: Helga So-Hartmann. A Descriptive Grammar of Daai Chin. ISBN 0-944613-46-2
- STEDT Monograph 8: Kenneth VanBik. Proto-Kuki-Chin: A Reconstructed Ancestor of the Kuki-Chin Languages. ISBN 0-944613-47-0
- STEDT Monograph 9: Richard Cook. The Eastern Han Chinese Grammaticon. ISBN 0-944613-48-9
- STEDT Monograph 10: Christopher Button. Proto Northern Chin. ISBN 0-944613-49-7

== See also ==
- James Matisoff
- Proto-Tibeto-Burman language
- Himalayan Languages Project
- International Conference on Sino-Tibetan Languages and Linguistics
