= Jan-Olof Svantesson =

Swedish linguist

Jan-Olof Svantesson, born 1944, is a professor of Linguistics at Lund University, Sweden.

Svantesson wrote his doctoral dissertation in 1983 on the phonology and morphology of the Kammu language, and has written a book about modern Mongolian phonology and the historical development of Mongolian.

== Publications ==
- Svantesson, Jan-Olof. 1983. Kammu Phonology and Morphology. Travaux de l'Institut de Linguistique de Lund 18. Lund, Sweden: CWK Gleerup.
- Svantesson, Jan-Olof. 2001. 'Phonology of a southern Swedish idiolect'. Working Papers 49, 156–159. Lund, Sweden: Dept. of Linguistics, Lund University.
- Svantesson, Jan-Olof 1985. 'Vowel harmony shift in Mongolian'. Lingua 67: 283–327.
- Svantesson, Jan-Olof 1986. 'Acoustic analysis of Chinese fricatives and affricates'. Journal of Chinese Linguistics 14: 53–70.
- Gårding, Eva, Paul Kratochvíl, Jan-Olof Svantesson & Zhang Jialu 1986. 'Tone 4 and Tone 3 discrimination in Modern Standard Chinese'. Language and Speech 29: 281–93.
- Svantesson, Jan-Olof 1986. 'Kammu relative clauses and the Keenan-Comrie hierarchy'. Studia Linguistica 40: 48–66.
- Svantesson, Jan-Olof 1988. 'U'. Linguistics of the Tibeto-Burman Area 11: 64–133. Berkeley.
- Svantesson, Jan-Olof 1989. 'Tonogenetic mechanisms in Northern Mon-Khmer'. Phonetica 46: 60–79.
- Svantesson, Jan-Olof 1990. 'Phonetic correlates of stress in Mongolian'. Proceedings, 1990 International conference on spoken language processing 1: 617–20. Tokyo: Acoustical Society of Japan.
- Lindau, Mona, Kjell Norlin & Jan-Olof Svantesson 1990. 'Some cross-linguistic differences in diphthongs'. Journal of the International Phonetic Association 20:1: 10–14.
- Svantesson, Jan-Olof 1991. Språk och skrift i Öst- och Sydöstasien. Lund: Studentlitteratur.
- Svantesson, Jan-Olof. 1991. 'Hu – a language with unorthodox tonogenesis'. I Jeremy Davidson (ed.), Austroasiatic languages: Essays in honour of H. L. Shorto, 67–79. London: SOAS.
- Svantesson, Jan-Olof 1991. 'Tradition and reform in China's Minority languages'. International Journal of Applied Linguistics 1: 70–88.
- Svantesson, Jan-Olof 1991. 'Vowel palatalization in Mongolian'. Actes du XIIème Congres International des Sciences Phonetiques 5: 102–105. Aix-en-Provence: Université de Provence.
- Svantesson, Jan-Olof 1992. 'Iconicity in Kammu morphology'. I Berhard Hung-Kay Luk & Barry D. Steben (eds.), Contacts between cultures – Eastern Asia: literature and humanities 3: 369–72. Lewiston, Kanada: Edwin Mellen Press.
- Svantesson, Jan-Olof, Damrong Tayanin, Kristina Lindell, Thongpheth Kingsada and Somseng Xayavong 1994. Watcanaanukom khamu-laaw (Kammu-Lao dictionary). Vientiane, Laos: Ministry of Information and Culture.
- Svantesson, Jan-Olof 1994. 'Syllable constituents in Kammu reduplication'. I W. Dressler, M. Prinzhorn & J. Rennison (eds.), Phonologica 1992, 265–74. Torino: Rosenberg & Sellier.
- Svantesson, Jan-Olof 1994. 'Tense, mood and aspect in Kammu'. I C. Bache, H. Basbøll & C.-E. Lindberg (eds.), Tense, aspect and action – Empirical and theoretical contributions to language typology, 265–78. Berlin: Mouton de Gruyter.
- Svantesson, Jan-Olof 1995. 'Phonetic evidence for the great Mongolian vowel shift'. I Kjell Elenius & Peter Branderud (eds.), Proceedings of the XIIIth International Congress of Phonetic Sciences ICPhS 95 1: 416–19. . Stockholm University.
- Svantesson, Jan-Olof 1995. 'Cyclic syllabification in Mongolian'. Natural Language and Linguistic Theory 13: 755–66.
- Svantesson, Jan-Olof 1996. 'Glides in Mongolian phonology'. I Lars Heltoft & H. Haberland (eds.), Proceedings of the Thirteenth Scandinavian conference of linguistics, 209–16.
- House, David & Jan-Olof Svantesson 1996. 'Tonal timing and vowel onset characteristics in Thai'. Pan-Asiatic Linguistics, Proceedings of the Fourth International Symposium on Languages and Linguistics 1: 104–113. Bangkok.
- Svantesson, Jan-Olof 1999. 'Thirteen years of Swedish phonetics – some trends'. Proceedings Fonetik 99, The Swedish phonetics conference June 2–4, 1999 81: 125–28. Gothenburg papers in theoretical linguistics.
- Svantesson, Jan-Olof 2000. 'Mongolic vowel shifts and the classification of the Mongolic languages'. Altai Hakpo (Journal of The Altaic Society of Korea) 10: 193–207.
- Svantesson, Jan-Olof 2001. 'Tonogenesis in Southeast Asia – Mon-Khmer and beyond'. I Shigeki Kaji (ed.), Proceedings of the Symposium Cross-linguistic studies of tonal phenomena, 45–58. Tokyo: Tokyo University of Foreign Studies.
- Svantesson, Jan-Olof 2003. 'Comments on Suwilai Premsrirat: Khmu dialects: a case of register complex and tonogenesis'. I S. Kaji (ed.), Proceedings of the Symposium Cross-linguistic studies of Tonal Phenomena, 29–36. Tokyo: Tokyo University of Foreign Studies.
- Svantesson, Jan-Olof 2003. 'Khalkha'. I Juha Janhunen (ed.), The Mongolic languages, 154–76. London, UK: Routledge.
- Svantesson, Jan-Olof and Niclas Burenhult 2003. 'Mental landscapes in prehistoric Southeast Asia: a view from linguistics'. I Anna Karlström and Anna Källén (ed.), Fishbones and glittering emblems: Southeast Asian Archaeology 2002, 281–287. Stockholm: Östasiatiska museet.
- Svantesson, Jan-Olof and Damrong Tayanin 2003. 'Sound symbolism in Kammu expressives'. I Solé, Maria-Josep, Daniel Recasens and Joaquin Romero (ed.), Proceedings of the 15th International congress of phonetic sciences., 2689–2692. Barcelona: Universitat Autònoma de Barcelona.
- Svantesson, Jan-Olof 2003. 'Vokalisering av r i en sydsvensk idiolekt'. I L-O Delsing, C. Falk, G. Josefsson och H. Á. Sigurdsson (ed.), Grammatik i fokus: Festskrift till Christer Platzack, vol. 1, 183–191. Lund: Inst. f. Nordiska språk, Lunds universitet.
- Svantesson, Jan-Olof 2003. 'Preaspiration in Old Mongolian?'. Phonum 9: 5–8.
- Svantesson, Jan-Olof and Anastasia Mukhanova Karlsson 2004. 'Minor syllable tones in Kammu'. I Bernard Bel and Isabelle Marlien (ed.), Proceedings, International symposium on tonal aspects of languages (TAL2004), 177–80. Beijing: Chinese Academy of Social Sciences.
- Karlsson, Anastasia Mukhanova and Jan-Olof Svantesson 2004. 'Prominence and mora in Mongolian'. I Bernard Bel and Isabelle Marlien (ed.), Speech prosody 2004: proceedings, 65–58. Nara.
- Svantesson, Jan-Olof 2004. 'What happens to Mongolian vowel harmony?'. MIT Working Papers in Linguistics 46: 94–106.
