= Chinosphere =

Chinosphere may refer to:

- Cryosphere (earth sciences), an arctic geography terminology
- Sinosphere (linguistics), a term refers to the Mainland Southeast Asia linguistic area
