= Robert Van Valin Jr. =

American linguist

Robert D. Van Valin Jr. (born February 1, 1952) is an American linguist and the principal researcher behind the development of Role and Reference Grammar, a functional theory of grammar encompassing syntax, semantics, and discourse pragmatics. His 1997 book (with Randy J. LaPolla) Syntax: structure, meaning and function is an attempt to provide a model for syntactic analysis which is just as relevant for languages like Dyirbal and Lakhota as it is for more commonly studied Indo-European languages.

Instead of positing a rich innate and universal syntactic structure (see Universal Grammar), Van Valin suggests that the only truly universal parts of a sentence are its nucleus, housing a predicating element such as a verb or adjective, and the core of the clause, containing the arguments, normally noun phrases, or adpositional phrases, that the predicate in the nucleus requires. Van Valin also departs from Chomskyan syntactic theory by not allowing abstract underlying forms or transformational rules and derivations.

== Biography ==
Van Valin received a BA in linguistics from UC San Diego (1973) and a PhD in linguistics from UC Berkeley (1977). He has taught at the University of Arizona, Temple University, UC Davis, and the University at Buffalo, The State University of New York, where he served as department chair for 15 years. He is currently on leave from Buffalo and is Professor of General Linguistics at the Heinrich Heine University in Düsseldorf, Germany. He has been a visiting researcher at the Australian National University and at the Max Planck Institutes for Psycholinguistics and for Human Cognitive and Brain Sciences. He has been awarded a NSF Graduate Fellowship, a Research Award for Outstanding Scholars from Outside of Germany from the Alexander von Humboldt Foundation (2006) and a Max Planck Fellowship at the Max Planck Institute for Psycholinguistics (2008–2013). He has been an Assistant Editor for Language (1991–1993) and has served on the LSA Program Committee (1994–1996), chairing the committee in 1996 and taught at the LSA Summer Institutes at UC Berkeley in 2009 and at University of Colorado in 2011.

He has also been a visiting faculty member at Stanford University, the University of California, Berkeley, the University of Sonora, and the University of Zagreb.

== Work ==
Van Valin's research areas are syntactic theory, (neuro) cognitive aspects of language, including acquisition and sentence processing, and language typology. He has done research on two American Indian languages, Lakhota (Siouan) and Yateé Zapotec (Oto-Manguean), and has supervised research on a number of endangered languages. These themes are woven together in his work in Role and Reference Grammar. He had an NSF-funded research project with Daniel Everett on information structure in Amazonian languages from 2003 to 2006. Currently, he is project director and co-project director on two projects (B01, D04) in Cooperative Research Center 991 The structure of representations in language, cognition and science funded by the German Science Foundation (2015–2019).

He has published eight books: Functional Syntax and Universal Grammar, Advances in Role and Reference Grammar, Syntax: Structure, Meaning and Function, An Introduction to Syntax, Exploring the Syntax-Semantics Interface, Investigations of the Syntax-Semantics-Pragmatics Interface, Information Structuring of Spoken Language from a Cross-Linguistic Perspective, Nominal anchoring: Specificity, definiteness and article systems across languages, and, The Cambridge Handbook of Role and Reference Grammar,

He has more than 100 publications. He is the general editor of the Oxford Surveys in Syntax and Morphology series (Oxford UP) and serves on numerous editorial and advisory boards.
