= Scott DeLancey =

American linguist (born 1949)

- Born: 1949 (age 76–77)
- Occupation: Linguist

Academic work
- Institutions: University of Oregon
- Main interests: Sino-Tibetan languages, Penutian languages, Cognitive Linguistics
- Notable ideas: Mirative, creolization, Central Tibeto-Burman languages

Scott DeLancey (born 1949) is an American linguist from the University of Oregon. His work focuses on typology and historical linguistics of Tibeto-Burman languages as well as North American indigenous languages such as the Penutian family, particularly the Klamath. His research is known for its diversity of its thematic and theoretical reach.

He is well known for having developed the concept of mirative, for promoting the study of comparative Penutian and for being a vocal proponent of the idea that a system of agreement should be reconstructed in proto-Tibeto-Burman.

== Sino-Tibetan linguistics ==
DeLancey is currently undertaking field research on several Tibeto-Burman languages of Northeast India. Typologically, he considers Sinitic a mainland southeast Asian family. The Chinese consensus on Sino-Tibetan theory holds that the Sino-Tibetan language family descends from a single linguistic ancestor that accounts for shared features of monosyllabism, tonal features, and isolating characteristics. Some of these may, however, have arisen from early borrowing between members now included in this language family. The history of Vietnamese, to cite one example, shows how an originally atonal, polysyllabic language can, under Chinese influence, adopt the characteristics of the latter.

DeLancey has developed the hypothesis that the growth of the Shang state may have led to the adoption of its language as a lingua franca among the southern Baiyue and the Sino-Tibetan speaking Zhou to the west, creating a common lexical stock. According to this theory, the emergence of the Zhou within the Shang state strengthened a Sino-Tibetan component, which, on the accession of the Zhou to dynastic power, subjected the lingua franca to a process of creolization with a stronger Zhou Sino-Tibetan lexicon while building on a morphology inherited from Shang dynasty speakers. Sinitic in his view fits a Mainland Southeast Asian typology. The sum effect of this hypothetical Zhou diffusion of their version of the lingua franca was, he argues, one of Tibeto-Burmanization, with a concomitant shift from a SVO morphological substrate to a language with an increasing tendency towards SOV structure.

DeLancey also proposed a new Tibeto-Burman subgroup, namely Central Tibeto-Burman.

In 2013, DeLancey was honored with a Festschrift entitled Functional-Historical Approaches to Explanation.

== Bibliography ==
- DeLancey, Scott, Lon Diehl & LaRaw Maran. 1978a. A localistic account of aspect in Jinghpaw. University of Michigan Papers in Linguistics 2(4). 49–64.
- DeLancey, Scott, Lon Diehl & LaRaw Maran. 1978b. The Tibeto-Burman aspect mechanisms. University of Michigan Papers in Linguistics 2(4). 65–88.
- 1981. An interpretation of split ergativity and related patterns. Language 57.3:626-57.
- Delancey, Scott (1982). "Modern Tibetan: A case study in ergative typology". Journal of Linguistic Research. 2 (1): 21–31.
- Delancey, Scott (1984). "Transitivity and ergative case in Lhasa Tibetan". Proceedings of the Tenth Annual Meeting of the Berkeley Linguistics Society. 10: 131–140. doi:10.3765/bls.v10i0.1976.
- (1984). "Categories of non-volitional actor in Lhasa Tibetan." A. Zide et al., eds., Proc. of the Conference on Participant Roles: South Asia and Adjacent Areas, pp. 58–70. IULC.
- (1984). "Agentivity in syntax." Chicago Linguistic Society Parasession on Agentivity and Causation.
- (1985). "On active typology and the nature of agentivity." F. Plank, ed., Relational Typology. Mouton.
- DeLancey, Scott. 1985. Lhasa Tibetan evidentials and the semantics of causation. In Mary Niepokujet et al. (eds.) Proceedings of the Eleventh Annual Meeting of the Berkeley Linguistics Society. 65–72.
- (1986). "Evidentiality and volitionality in Tibetan." W. Chafe and J. Nichols, eds., Evidentiality: The Linguistic Coding of Epistemology, pp. 203–13.
- Delancey, Scott (1990). "Ergativity and the cognitive model of event structure in Lhasa Tibetan". Cognitive Linguistics. 1 (3): 289–321. doi:10.1515/cogl.1990.1.3.289. S2CID 143931344.
- Delancey, Scott (1990). "Tibetan evidence for Nungish metathesis". Linguistics of the Tibeto-Burman Area. 12 (2): 25–31.
- Delancey, Scott (1990). "Contour tones from lost syllables in Central Tibetan". Linguistics of the Tibeto-Burman Area. 12 (2): 33–34.
- Delancey, Scott (1991). "The origins of verb serialization in Modern Tibetan". Studies in Language. 15 (1): 1–23. doi:10.1075/sl.15.1.02del.
- Delancey, Scott (1992). "The historical status of the conjunct/disjunct pattern in Tibeto-Burman". Acta Linguistica Hafniensia. 25: 39–62. doi:10.1080/03740463.1992.10412277.
- Delancey, Scott (1997). "Mirativity: the grammatical marking of unexpected information". Linguistic Typology. 1: 33–52. doi:10.1515/lity.1997.1.1.33. S2CID 122264213.
- (1998). "Semantic categorization in Tibetan honorific nouns." Anthropological Linguistics 40:109-23.
- (1999). "Relativization in Tibetan." in Yogendra Yadava and Warren Glover, eds., Studies in Nepalese Linguistics, pp. 231–49. Kathmandu: Royal Nepal Academy.
- 2002. [The mirative and evidentiality]. Journal of Pragmatics 33.3:369-382.
- DeLancey, Scott. 2003. Lhasa Tibetan. In G. Thurgood and R. LaPolla, The Sino-Tibetan Languages, 270–288. London: Routledge.
- 2010. DeLancey, Scott. 2010. 'Towards a history of verb agreement in Tibeto-Burman.' Himalayan Linguistics Journal 9.1. 1-39.
- 2011. "On the Origins of Sinitic." Proceedings of the 23rd North American Conference on Chinese Linguistics (NACCL-23), 2011. Volume 1, edited by Zhuo Jing-Schmidt, University of Oregon, Eugene. Pages 51–64.
- (2012) 'Still mirative after all these years. Linguistic Typology 16.3
- 1981. The category of direction in Tibeto-Burman. Linguistics of the Tibeto-Burman Area 6.1:83-102.
- 1997. The Penutian hypothesis: Retrospect and prospect. (with Victor Golla). International Journal of American Linguistics 63:171-202.
