= Old Chinese =

Oldest attested stage of Chinese

- Archaic Chinese
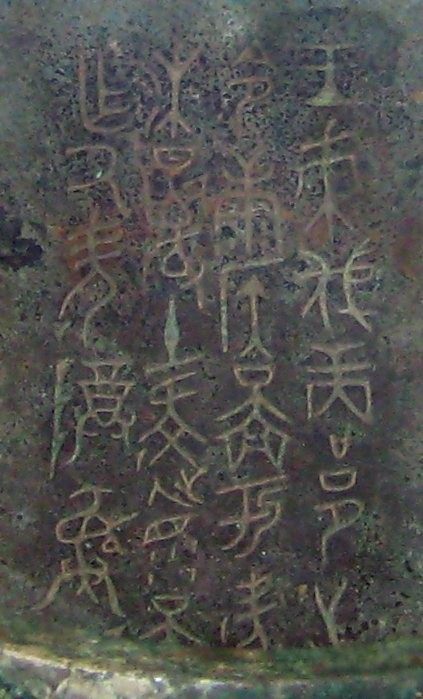
- Inscription on the Kang Hou gui (late 11th century BC)
- Native to: Ancient China
- Era: Late Shang, Zhou, Warring States period, Qin, Han (Note: The time interval assigned to Old Chinese varies between authors. Some scholars limit it to the early Zhou, based on the availability of documentary evidence of the phonology. Many include the whole Zhou period and often the earliest written evidence from the late Shang, while some also include the Qin, Han and occasionally even later periods. The ancestor of the oldest layer of the Min languages is believed to have split off from the other varieties of Chinese during the Han dynasty.)
- Language family: Sino-Tibetan: Sinitic; Chinese; Old Chinese
- Writing system: Oracle bone script; Bronze script; Seal script

Language codes
- ISO 639-3: och
- Glottolog: shan1294 Shanggu Hanyu
- Linguasphere: 79-AAA-a

Chinese name
- Traditional Chinese: 上古漢語
- Simplified Chinese: 上古汉语
Transcriptions
Standard Mandarin
- Hanyu Pinyin: Shànggǔ hànyǔ
- Wade–Giles: Shang^{4}-ku^{3} han^{4}-yü^{3}
- IPA: [ʂâŋ.kù xân.ỳ]
Hakka
- Romanization: Song-gu hon-ngi
Yue: Cantonese
- Yale Romanization: Seuhng-gú hon-yúh
- Jyutping: Soeng6-gu2 hon3-jyu5
Southern Min
- Hokkien POJ: Siōng-kó͘ hàn-gú
- Teochew Peng'im: Ziên^{6}-gou^{2} hang^{3}-ghe^{2}
Old Chinese
- Baxter–Sagart (2014): /*daŋʔ-s kˤaʔ *n̥ˤar-s *ŋ(r)aʔ/

Old Chinese, also called Archaic Chinese in older works, is the oldest attested stage of Chinese, and the ancestor of all modern varieties of Chinese. The earliest examples of Chinese are divinatory inscriptions on oracle bones from around 1250 BC, in the Late Shang period. Bronze inscriptions became plentiful during the following Zhou dynasty. The latter part of the Zhou period saw a flowering of literature, including classical works such as the Analects, the Mencius, and the Zuo Zhuan. These works served as models for Literary Chinese (or Classical Chinese), which remained the written standard until the early twentieth century, thus preserving the vocabulary and grammar of late Old Chinese.

Old Chinese was written with several early forms of Chinese characters, including oracle bone, bronze, and seal scripts. Throughout the Old Chinese period, there was a close correspondence between a character and a monosyllabic and monomorphemic word. Although the script is not alphabetic, the majority of characters were created based on phonetic considerations. At first, words that were difficult to represent visually were written using a "borrowed" character for a similar-sounding word (rebus principle). Later on, to reduce ambiguity, new characters were created for these phonetic borrowings by appending a radical that conveys a broad semantic category, resulting in compound xingsheng (phono-semantic) characters. For the earliest attested stage of Old Chinese of the late Shang dynasty, the phonetic information implicit in these xingsheng characters which are grouped into phonetic series, known as the xiesheng series, represents the only direct source of phonological data for reconstructing the language. The corpus of xingsheng characters was greatly expanded in the following Zhou dynasty. In addition, the rhymes of the earliest recorded poems, primarily those of the Classic of Poetry, provide an extensive source of phonological information with respect to syllable finals for the Central Plains dialects during the Western Zhou and Spring and Autumn periods. Similarly, the Chu Ci provides rhyme data for the dialect spoken in the Chu region during the Warring States period. These rhymes, together with clues from the phonetic components of xingsheng characters, allow most characters attested in Old Chinese to be assigned to one of 30 or 31 rhyme groups. For late Old Chinese of the Han period, the modern Southern Min languages, the oldest layer of Sino-Vietnamese vocabulary, and a few early transliterations of foreign proper names, as well as names for non-native flora and fauna, also provide insights into language reconstruction.

Although many of the finer details remain unclear, most scholars agree that Old Chinese differed from Middle Chinese in lacking retroflex and palatal obstruents but having initial consonant clusters of some sort, and in having voiceless nasals and liquids. Most recent reconstructions also describe Old Chinese as a language without tones, but having consonant clusters at the end of the syllable, which developed into tone distinctions in Middle Chinese.

Most researchers trace the core vocabulary of Old Chinese to Sino-Tibetan, with much early borrowing from neighbouring languages. During the Zhou period, the originally monosyllabic vocabulary was augmented with polysyllabic words formed by compounding and reduplication, although monosyllabic vocabulary was still predominant. Unlike Middle Chinese and the modern Chinese languages, Old Chinese had a significant amount of derivational morphology. Several affixes have been identified, including ones for the verbification of nouns, conversion between transitive and intransitive verbs, and formation of causative verbs. Like modern Chinese, it appears to be uninflected, though a pronoun case and number system seems to have existed during the Shang and early Zhou but was already in the process of disappearing by the Classical period. Likewise, by the Classical period, most morphological derivations had become unproductive or vestigial, and grammatical relationships were primarily indicated using word order and grammatical particles.

== Classification ==
Middle Chinese and its southern neighbours Kra–Dai, Hmong–Mien and the Vietic branch of Austroasiatic have similar tone systems, syllable structure, grammatical features and lack of inflection, but these are believed to be areal features spread by diffusion rather than indicating common descent. The most widely accepted hypothesis is that Chinese belongs to the Sino-Tibetan language family, together with Burmese, Tibetan and many other languages spoken in the Himalayas and the Southeast Asian Massif. The evidence consists of some hundreds of proposed cognate words, including such basic vocabulary as the following:

Sino-Tibetan cognates
Meaning	Old Chinese (Note: Reconstructed Old Chinese forms are starred, and follow Baxter (1992) with some graphical substitutions from his more recent work: *ə for *ɨ and consonants rendered according to IPA conventions.)	Old Tibetan	Old Burmese
'I'	吾 *ŋa	ṅa	ṅā
'you'	汝 *njaʔ		naṅ
'not'	無 *mja	ma	ma
'two'	二 *njijs	gñis	nhac < *nhik
'three'	三 *sum	gsum	sumḥ
'five'	五 *ŋaʔ	lṅa	ṅāḥ
'six'	六 *C-rjuk (Note: The notation "*C-" indicates that there is evidence of an Old Chinese consonant before *r, but the particular consonant cannot be identified.)	drug	khrok < *khruk
'sun'	日 *njit	ñi-ma	niy
'name'	名 *mjeŋ	myiṅ < *myeŋ	maññ < *miŋ
'ear'	耳 *njəʔ	rna	nāḥ
'joint'	節 *tsik	tshigs	chac < *chik
'fish'	魚 *ŋja	ña < *ṅʲa	ṅāḥ
'bitter'	苦 *kʰaʔ	kha	khāḥ
'kill'	殺 *srjat	-sad	sat
'poison'	毒 *duk	dug	tok < *tuk

Although the relationship was first proposed in the early 19th century and is now broadly accepted, reconstruction of Sino-Tibetan is much less developed than that of families such as Indo-European or Austronesian. Although Old Chinese is by far the earliest attested member of the family, its logographic script does not clearly indicate the pronunciation of words. Other difficulties have included the great diversity of the languages, the lack of inflection in many of them, and the effects of language contact. In addition, many of the smaller languages are poorly described because they are spoken in mountainous areas that are difficult to reach, including several sensitive border zones.

Initial consonants generally correspond regarding place and manner of articulation, but voicing and aspiration are much less regular, and prefixal elements vary widely between languages. Some researchers believe that both these phenomena reflect lost minor syllables. Proto-Tibeto-Burman as reconstructed by Benedict and Matisoff lacks an aspiration distinction on initial stops and affricates. Aspiration in Old Chinese often corresponds to pre-initial consonants in Tibetan and Lolo-Burmese, and is believed to be a Chinese innovation arising from earlier prefixes. Proto-Sino-Tibetan is reconstructed with a six-vowel system as in recent reconstructions of Old Chinese, with the Tibeto-Burman languages distinguished by the merger of the mid-central vowel *-ə- with *-a-. The other vowels are preserved by both, with some alternation between *-e- and *-i-, and between *-o- and *-u-.

== Texts ==
Timeline of early Chinese history and available texts
c. 1250 BC	Late Shang; oracle bones; short bronze inscriptions
c. 1046 BC	Western Zhou; bronze inscriptions; early Shu (Documents), Shi (Poetry), I Ching
771 BC	Spring and Autumn period; Annals, later Shu; bronze inscriptions
476 BC	Warring States period; received classic texts; excavated texts
221 BC	Qin unification

The earliest known written records of the Chinese language were found at the Yinxu site near modern Anyang identified as the last capital of the Shang dynasty, and date from about 1250 BC. These are the oracle bones, short inscriptions carved on turtle plastrons and ox scapulae for divinatory purposes, as well as a few brief bronze inscriptions. The language written is undoubtedly an early form of Chinese, but is difficult to interpret due to the limited subject matter and high proportion of proper names. Only half of the 4,000 characters used have been identified with certainty. Little is known about the grammar of this language, but it seems much less reliant on grammatical particles than Classical Chinese.

From early in the Western Zhou period, around 1000 BC, the most important recovered texts are bronze inscriptions, many of considerable length. These texts are found throughout the Zhou area. Although their language changed over time, it was highly uniform across this range at each point in time, suggesting that it reflected the prestige form used by the Zhou elite. Even longer pre-Classical texts on a wide range of subjects have also been transmitted through the literary tradition. The oldest sections of the Book of Documents, the Classic of Poetry and the I Ching, also date from the early Zhou period, and closely resemble the bronze inscriptions in vocabulary, syntax, and style. A greater proportion of this more varied vocabulary has been identified than for the oracular period.

The four centuries preceding the unification of China in 221 BC (the later Spring and Autumn period and the Warring States period) constitute the Chinese classical period in the strict sense. There are many bronze inscriptions from this period, but they are vastly outweighed by a rich literature written in ink on bamboo and wooden slips and (toward the end of the period) silk. Although these are perishable materials, a significant number of texts were transmitted as copies, and a few of these survived to the present day as the received classics. Works from this period, including the Analects, the Mencius and the Commentary of Zuo, have been admired as models of prose style by later generations. As a result, the syntax and vocabulary of Old Chinese was preserved in Literary Chinese (wenyan), the standard for formal writing in China and neighboring Sinosphere countries until the early 20th century.

== Script ==
Shang dynasty oracle bone script on an ox scapula

Each character of the script represented a single Old Chinese morpheme, originally identical to a word. Most scholars believe that these words were monosyllabic. William Baxter and Laurent Sagart propose that some words consisted of a minor syllable followed by a full syllable, as in modern Khmer, but still written with a single character. The development of characters to signify the words of the language follows the same three stages that characterized Egyptian hieroglyphs, Mesopotamian cuneiform script and the Maya script.

Some words could be represented by pictures (later stylized) such as 日 rì 'sun', 人 rén 'person' and 木 mù 'tree, wood', by abstract symbols such as 三 sān 'three' and 上 shàng 'up', or by composite symbols such as 林 lín 'forest' (two trees). About 1,000 of the oracle bone characters, nearly a quarter of the total, are of this type, though 300 of them have not yet been deciphered. Though the pictographic origins of these characters are apparent, they have already undergone extensive simplification and conventionalization. Evolved forms of most of these characters are still in common use today.

Next, words that could not be represented pictorially, such as abstract terms and grammatical particles, were signified by borrowing characters of pictorial origin representing similar-sounding words (the "rebus strategy"):

- The word lì 'tremble' was originally written with the character 栗 for lì 'chestnut'.
- The pronoun and modal particle qí was written with the character 其 originally representing jī 'winnowing basket'.

Sometimes the borrowed character would be modified slightly to distinguish it from the original, as with 毋 wú 'don't', a borrowing of 母 mǔ 'mother'. Later, phonetic loans were systematically disambiguated by the addition of semantic indicators, usually to the less common word:

- The word lì 'tremble' was later written with the character 慄, formed by adding the symbol 忄, a variant of 心 xīn 'heart'.
- The less common original word jī 'winnowing basket' came to be written with the compound 箕, obtained by adding the symbol 竹 zhú 'bamboo' to the character.

Such phono-semantic compound characters were already used extensively on the oracle bones, and the vast majority of characters created since then have been of this type. In the Shuowen Jiezi, a dictionary compiled in the 2nd century, 82% of the 9,353 characters are classified as phono-semantic compounds. In the light of the modern understanding of Old Chinese phonology, researchers now believe that most of the characters originally classified as semantic compounds also have a phonetic nature.

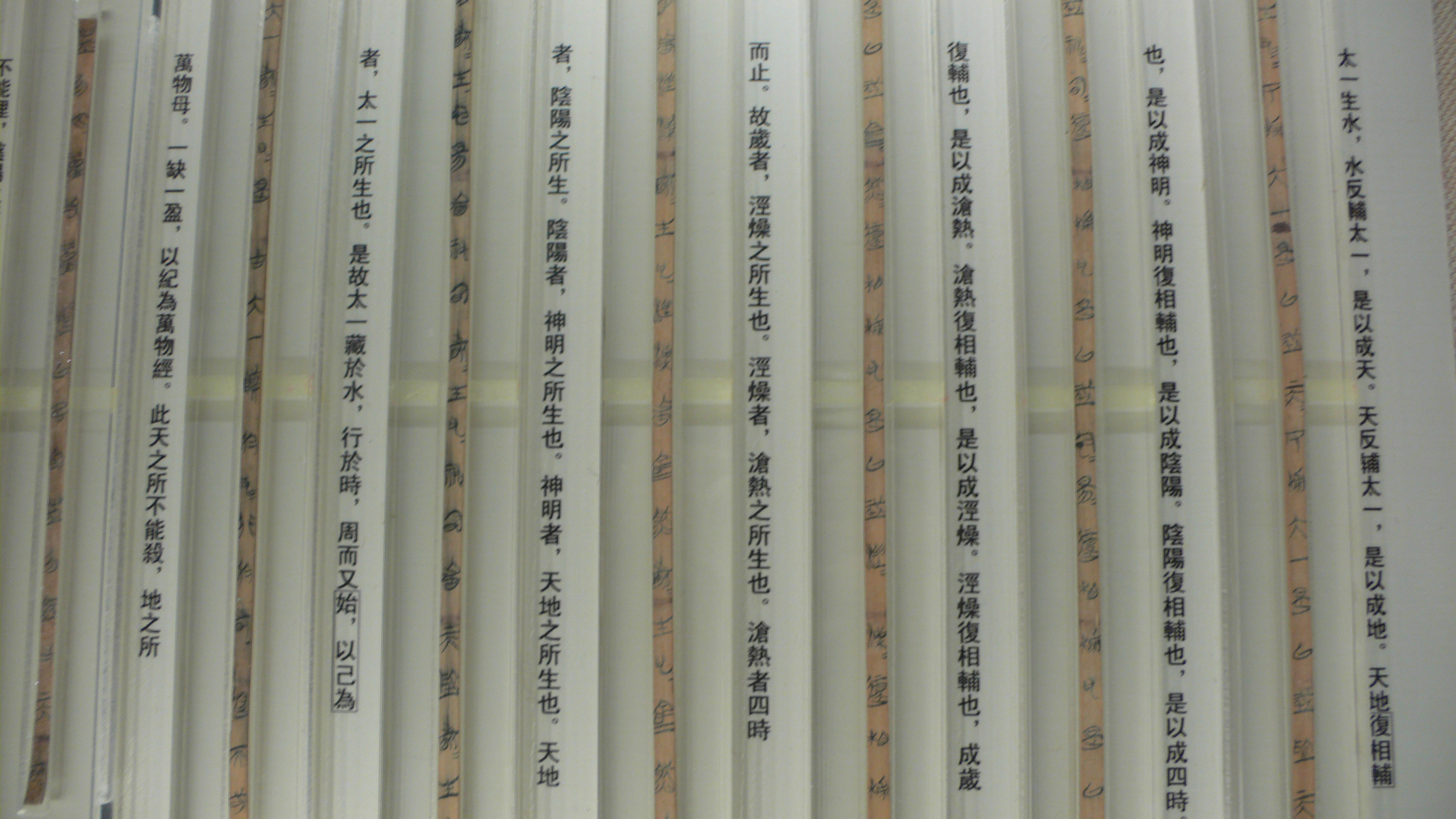
Guodian Chu Slips (c. 300 BC) with transcriptions in modern characters

These developments were already present in the oracle bone script, possibly implying a significant period of development prior to the extant inscriptions. This may have involved writing on perishable materials, as suggested by the appearance on oracle bones of the character 冊 cè 'records'. The character is thought to depict bamboo or wooden strips tied together with leather thongs, a writing material known from later archaeological finds.

Development and simplification of the script continued during the pre-Classical and Classical periods, with characters becoming less pictorial and more linear and regular, with rounded strokes being replaced by sharp angles. The language developed compound words, though almost all constituent morphemes could also be used as independent words. Hundreds of morphemes of two or more syllables also entered the language, and were written with one phono-semantic compound character per syllable. During the Warring States period, writing became more widespread, with further simplification and variation, particularly in the eastern states. The most conservative script prevailed in the western state of Qin, which would later impose its standard on the whole of China.

== Phonology ==
Old Chinese phonology has been reconstructed using a unique method relying on textual sources. The starting point is the Qieyun dictionary (601 AD), which classifies the reading pronunciation of each character found in texts to that time within a precise, but abstract, phonological system. Scholars have sought to assign phonetic values to these Middle Chinese categories by comparing them with modern varieties of Chinese, Sino-Xenic pronunciations and transcriptions. Next, the phonology of Old Chinese is reconstructed by comparing the Qieyun categories to the rhyming practice of the Classic of Poetry (early 1st millennium BC) and the shared phonetic components of Chinese characters, some of which are slightly older. More recent efforts have supplemented this method with evidence from Old Chinese derivational morphology, from Chinese varieties preserving distinctions not found in the Qieyun, such as Min and Waxiang, and from early transcriptions and loans.

Although many details are still disputed, recent formulations are in substantial agreement on the core issues. For example, the Old Chinese initial consonants recognized by Li Fang-Kuei and William Baxter are given below, with Baxter's (mostly tentative) additions given in parentheses:

Reconstructed Old Chinese initial consonants
		Labial	Dental		Palatal (Note: Baxter describes his reconstruction of the palatal initials as "especially tentative, being based largely on scanty graphic evidence".)	Velar		Laryngeal	
		Labial	plain	sibilant	Palatal	plain	labialized	plain	labialized
Stop or affricate	voiceless	*p	*t	*ts		*k	*kʷ	*ʔ	*ʔʷ
Stop or affricate	aspirate	*pʰ	*tʰ	*tsʰ		*kʰ	*kʷʰ		
Stop or affricate	voiced	*b	*d	*dz		*ɡ	*ɡʷ		
Nasal	voiceless	*m̥	*n̥			*ŋ̊	*ŋ̊ʷ		
Nasal	voiced	*m	*n			*ŋ	*ŋʷ		
Lateral	voiceless		*l̥						
Lateral	voiced		*l						
Fricative or approximant	voiceless		(*r̥)	*s	(*j̊)			*h	*hʷ
Fricative or approximant	voiced		*r	(*z)	(*j)			(*ɦ)	(*w)

Various initial clusters have been proposed, especially clusters of *s- with other consonants, but this area remains unsettled.

Bernhard Karlgren and many later scholars posited the medials *-r-, *-j- and the combination *-rj- to explain the retroflex and palatal obstruents of Middle Chinese, as well as many of its vowel contrasts. *-r- is generally accepted. However, although the distinction denoted by *-j- is universally accepted, its realization as a palatal glide has been challenged on a number of grounds, and a variety of different realizations have been used in recent constructions.

Reconstructions since the 1980s usually propose six vowels: (Note: The vowel here written as *ə is treated as *ɨ, *ə or *ɯ by different authors.) (Note: The six-vowel system represents a re-analysis of a system proposed by Li and still used by some authors, comprising four vowels *i, *u, *ə and *a and three diphthongs. Li's diphthongs *ia and *ua correspond to *e and *o respectively, while Li's *iə becomes *i or *ə in different contexts.)

Old Chinese vowels
	Front	Central	Back
Close	*i		*u
Mid	*e	*ə	*o
Open		*a	

Vowels could optionally be followed by the same codas as in Middle Chinese: a glide *-j or *-w, a nasal *-m, *-n or *-ŋ, or a stop *-p, *-t or *-k. Some scholars also allow for a labiovelar coda *-kʷ. Most scholars now believe that Old Chinese lacked the tones found in later stages of the language, but had optional post-codas *-ʔ and *-s, which developed into the Middle Chinese rising and departing tones respectively.

== Grammar ==
Little is known of the grammar of the language of the Oracular and pre-Classical periods, as the texts are often of a ritual or formulaic nature, and much of their vocabulary has not been deciphered. In contrast, the rich literature of the Warring States period has been extensively analysed. Having no inflection, Old Chinese was heavily reliant on word order, grammatical particles, and inherent word classes.

=== Word classes ===
Classifying Old Chinese words is not always straightforward, as words were not marked for function, word classes overlapped, and words of one class could sometimes be used in roles normally reserved for a different class. The task is more difficult with written texts than it would have been for speakers of Old Chinese, because the derivational morphology is often hidden by the writing system. For example, the verb *sək 'to block' and the derived noun *səks 'frontier' were both written with the same character 塞.

Personal pronouns exhibit a wide variety of forms in Old Chinese texts, possibly due to dialectal variation. There were two groups of first-person pronouns in the oracle bone inscriptions:

- *lja 余, *ljaʔ 予, (Note: In the later reading tradition, 予 (when used as a pronoun) is treated as a graphical variant of 余. In the Shijing, however, both pronoun and verb usages of 予 rhyme in the rising tone.) *ljə 台 and *lrjəmʔ 朕, used by the king to refer to himself;
- *ŋa 吾, *ŋajʔ 我 and *ŋaŋ 卬, used for the Shang people as a whole.

This distinction is largely absent in later texts, and the *l- forms disappeared during the classical period. In the post-Han period, 我 (modern Mandarin wǒ) came to be used as the general first-person pronoun.

Second-person pronouns included *njaʔ 汝, *njəjʔ 爾, *njə 而 and *njak 若. The forms 汝 and 爾 continued to be used interchangeably until their replacement by the northwestern variant 你 (modern Mandarin nǐ) in the Tang period. However, in some Min dialects the second-person pronoun is derived from 汝.

Case distinctions were particularly marked among third-person pronouns. There was no third-person subject pronoun, but *tjə 之, originally a distal demonstrative, came to be used as a third-person object pronoun in the classical period. The possessive pronoun was originally *kjot 厥, replaced in the classical period by *ɡjə 其. In the post-Han period, 其 came to be used as the general third-person pronoun. It survives in some Wu dialects, but has been replaced by a variety of forms elsewhere.

There were demonstrative and interrogative pronouns, but no indefinite pronouns with the meanings 'something' or 'nothing'. The distributive pronouns were formed with a *-k suffix:

- *djuk 孰 'which one' from *djuj 誰 'who'
- *kak 各 'each one' from *kjaʔ 舉 'all'
- *wək 或 'someone' from *wjəʔ 有 'there is'
- *mak 莫 'no-one' from *mja 無 'there is no'

As in the modern language, localizers (compass directions, 'above', 'inside' and the like) could be placed after nouns to indicate relative positions. They could also precede verbs to indicate the direction of the action. Nouns denoting times were another special class (time words); they usually preceded the subject to specify the time of an action. However the classifiers so characteristic of Modern Chinese only became common in the Han period and the subsequent Northern and Southern dynasties.

Old Chinese verbs, like their modern counterparts, did not show tense or aspect; these could be indicated with adverbs or particles if required. Verbs could be transitive or intransitive. As in the modern language, adjectives were a special kind of intransitive verb, and a few transitive verbs could also function as modal auxiliaries or as prepositions.

Adverbs described the scope of a statement or various temporal relationships. They included two families of negatives starting with *p- and *m-, such as *pjə 不 and *mja 無. Modern northern varieties derive the usual negative from the first family, while southern varieties preserve the second. The language had no adverbs of degree until late in the Classical period.

Particles were function words serving a range of purposes. As in the modern language, there were sentence-final particles marking imperatives and yes/no questions. Other sentence-final particles expressed a range of connotations, the most important being *ljaj 也, expressing static factuality, and *ɦjəʔ 矣, implying a change. Other particles included the subordination marker *tjə 之 and the nominalizing particles *tjaʔ 者 (agent) and *srjaʔ 所 (object). Conjunctions could join nouns or clauses.

=== Sentence structure ===
As with English and modern Chinese, Old Chinese sentences can be analysed as a subject (a noun phrase, sometimes understood) followed by a predicate, which could be of either nominal or verbal type.

Before the Classical period, nominal predicates consisted of a copular particle *wjij 惟 followed by a noun phrase:

予 惟 小 子
*ljaʔ *wjij *sjewʔ *tsjəʔ
I BE small child
'I am a young person.' ("Great Announcement", Book of Documents)

The negated copula *pjə-wjij 不惟 is attested in oracle bone inscriptions, and later fused as *pjəj 非. In the Classical period, nominal predicates were constructed with the sentence-final particle *ljaj 也 instead of the copula 惟, but 非 was retained as the negative form, with which 也 was optional:

其 至 爾 力 也 其 中 非 爾 力 也
*ɡjə *tjits *njəjʔ *C-rjək *ljajʔ *ɡjə *k-ljuŋ *pjəj *njəjʔ *C-rjək *ljajʔ
its arrive you strength FP its centre NEG you strength FP
(of shooting at a mark a hundred paces distant) 'That you reach it is owing to your strength, but that you hit the mark is not owing to your strength.' (Mencius 10.1/51/13)

The copular verb 是 (shì) of Literary and Modern Chinese dates from the Han period. In Old Chinese the word was a near demonstrative ('this').

As in Modern Chinese, but unlike most Tibeto-Burman languages, the basic word order in a verbal sentence was subject–verb–object:

孟子 見 梁 惠 王
*mraŋs-*tsjəʔ *kens *C-rjaŋ *wets *wjaŋ
Mencius see Liang Hui king
'Mencius saw King Hui of Liang.' (Mencius 1.1/1/3)

Besides inversions for emphasis, there were two exceptions to this rule: a pronoun object of a negated sentence or an interrogative pronoun object would be placed before the verb:

歲 不 我 與
*swjats *pjə *ŋajʔ *ljaʔ
year NEG me wait
'The years do not wait for us.' (Analects 17.1/47/23)

An additional noun phrase could be placed before the subject to serve as the topic. Like the modern language, Old Chinese used in situ questions, forming yes–no questions by adding a sentence-final particle, and open questions by substituting an interrogative pronoun for the requested element.

=== Modification ===
In general, Old Chinese modifiers preceded the words they modified. Thus relative clauses were placed before the noun, usually marked by the particle *tjə 之 (in a role similar to Modern Chinese de 的):

不 忍 人 之 心
*pjə *njənʔ *njin *tjə *sjəm
NEG endure person REL heart
'... the heart that cannot bear the afflictions of others.' (Mencius 3.6/18/4)

A common instance of this construction was adjectival modification, since the Old Chinese adjective was a type of verb (as in the modern language), but 之 was usually omitted after monosyllabic adjectives.

Similarly, adverbial modifiers, including various forms of negation, usually occurred before the verb. As in the modern language, time adjuncts occurred either at the start of the sentence or before the verb, depending on their scope, while duration adjuncts were placed after the verb. Instrumental and place adjuncts were usually placed after the verb phrase. These later moved to a position before the verb, as in the modern language.

== Vocabulary ==
The improved understanding of Old Chinese phonology has enabled the study of the origins of Chinese words (rather than the characters with which they are written). Most researchers trace the core vocabulary to a Sino-Tibetan ancestor language, with much early borrowing from other neighbouring languages. The traditional view was that Old Chinese was an isolating language. Linguists still believe that the language lacked inflection, but it has become clear that words could be formed by derivational affixation, reduplication and compounding.

=== Loanwords ===
During the Old Chinese period, Chinese civilization expanded from a compact area around the lower Wei River and middle Yellow River eastwards across the North China Plain to Shandong and then south into the valley of the Yangtze. There are no records of the non-Chinese languages formerly spoken in those areas and subsequently displaced by the Chinese expansion. However they are believed to have contributed to the vocabulary of Old Chinese, and may be the source of some of the many Chinese words whose origins are still unknown.

Jerry Norman and Mei Tsu-lin have identified early Austroasiatic loanwords in Old Chinese, possibly from the peoples of the lower Yangtze basin known to ancient Chinese as the Yue. For example, the early Chinese name *kroŋ (江 jiāng) for the Yangtze was later extended to a general word for 'river' in south China. Norman and Mei suggest that the word is cognate with Vietnamese sông (from *krong) and Mon kruŋ 'river'.

Haudricourt and Strecker have proposed a number of borrowings from the Hmong–Mien languages. These include terms related to rice cultivation, which began in the middle Yangtze valley:

- *ʔjaŋ (秧 yāng) 'rice seedling' from proto-Hmong–Mien *jaŋ^{A},
- *luʔ (稻 dào) 'unhulled rice' from proto-Hmong–Mien *mblau^{A}.

Other words are believed to have been borrowed from languages to the south of the Chinese area, but it is not clear which was the original source, e.g.

- *zjaŋʔ (象 xiàng) 'elephant' can be compared with Mon coiŋ, proto-Tai *jaŋ^{C} and Burmese chaŋ.
- *ke (雞 jī) 'chicken' versus proto-Tai *kəi^{B}, proto-Hmong–Mien *kai and proto-Viet–Muong *r-ka.

In ancient times, the Tarim Basin was occupied by speakers of Indo-European Tocharian languages, the source of *mjit (蜜 mì) 'honey', from proto-Tocharian *ḿət(ə) (where *ḿ is palatalized; cf. Tocharian B mit), cognate with English mead. (Note: Jacques proposed a different, unattested, Tocharian form as the source. Meier and Peyrot recently defended the traditional Tocharian etymology.)

=== Affixation ===
Chinese philologists have long noted words with related meanings and similar pronunciations, sometimes written using the same character. Henri Maspero attributed some of these alternations to consonant clusters resulting from derivational affixes. Subsequent work has identified several such affixes, some of which appear to have cognates in other Sino-Tibetan languages. A few of these were still productive or transparent in Old Chinese.

A common case is "derivation by tone change", in which words in the departing tone appear to be derived from words in other tones. If Haudricourt's theory of the origin of the departing tone is accepted, these tonal derivations can be interpreted as the result of a derivational suffix *-s with a range of functions. As Tibetan has a similar suffix, it may be inherited from Sino-Tibetan. The most common function was nominalization of verbs, as in the following examples:

- *drjon (傳 chuán) 'to transmit' and *drjons (傳 zhuàn) 'a record'
- *nup (納 nà) 'to bring in' and *nuts < *nups (內 nèi) 'inside'
- *tjək (織 zhī) 'to weave' and *tjəks (織 zhì) 'silk cloth' (compare Written Tibetan ʼthag 'to weave' and thags 'woven, cloth')

The *-s suffix also formed denominal verbs, as in these examples:

- *kon (冠 guān) 'cap' and *kons (冠 guàn) 'to cap'
- *ʔjəj (衣 yī) 'clothes' and *ʔjəjs (衣 yì) 'to wear, to clothe'
- *wjaŋ (王 wáng) 'king' and *wjaŋs (王 wàng) 'be king'

Another alternation involves transitive verbs with an unvoiced initial and passive or stative verbs with a voiced initial:

- *kens (見 jiàn) 'to see' and *ɡens (現 xiàn) 'to appear'
- *kraw (交 jiāo) 'to mix' and *ɡraw (殽 yáo) 'mixed, confused'
- *trjaŋ (張 zhāng) 'to stretch' and *drjaŋ (長 cháng) 'long'

Some scholars hold that the transitive verbs with voiceless initials are basic and the voiced initials reflect a de-transitivizing nasal prefix. Others suggest that the transitive verbs were derived by the addition of a causative prefix *s- to a stative verb, causing devoicing of the following voiced initial. Both postulated prefixes have parallels in other Sino-Tibetan languages, in some of which they are still productive. Several other affixes have been proposed.

The derivational affixes lost their productivity towards the end of the Zhou period, and their functions were taken over by forms such as auxiliary verbs.

=== Reduplication and compounding ===
Old Chinese morphemes were originally monosyllabic, but during the Western Zhou period many new disyllabic words entered the language. By the classical period, 25–30% of the lexicon was polysyllabic, though monosyllabic words occurred more frequently and made up 80–90% of the text. Disyllabic morphemes include the famous *ɡa-lep (胡蝶 (Note: During the Old Chinese period, the word for butterfly was written as 胡蝶. During later centuries, the 'insect' radical (虫) was added to the first character to give the modern 蝴蝶.) húdié) 'butterfly' from the Zhuangzi.

Many disyllabic, monomorphemic words, particularly names of insects, birds and plants, and expressive adjectives and adverbs, were formed by varieties of reduplication: (Note: All examples are found in the Shijing.)

- full reduplication (diézì 疊字 'repeated words'), in which the syllable is repeated, as in *ʔjuj-ʔjuj (威威 wēiwēi) 'tall and grand' and *ljo-ljo (俞俞 yúyú) 'happy and at ease'.
- rhyming semi-reduplication (diéyùn 疊韻 'repeated rhymes'), in which only the final is repeated, as in *ʔiwʔ-liwʔ (窈窕 yǎotiǎo) 'elegant, beautiful' and *meŋ-reŋ (螟蛉 mínglíng) 'bollworm'. The initial of the second syllable is often *l- or *r-.
- alliterative semi-reduplication (shuāngshēng 雙聲 'paired initials'), in which the initial is repeated, as in *tsʰrjum-tsʰrjaj (參差 cēncī) 'irregular, uneven' and *ba-bjək (匍匐 púfú) 'to crawl'.
- vowel alternation, especially of *-e- and *-o-, as in *tsʰjek-tsʰjok (刺促 qìcù) 'busy' and *ɡreʔ-ɡroʔ (邂逅 xièhòu) 'carefree and happy'. Alternation between *-i- and *-u- also occurred, as in *pjit-pjut (觱沸 bìfú) 'rushing (of wind or water)' and *srjit-srjut (蟋蟀 xīshuài) 'cricket'.

More words, especially nouns, were formed by compounding, including:

- qualification of one noun by another (placed in front), as in *mok-kʷra (木瓜 mùguā) 'quince' (literally 'tree-melon'), and *trjuŋ-njit (中日 zhōngrì) 'noon' (literally 'middle-day').
- verb–object compounds, as in *sjə-mraʔ (司馬 sīmǎ) 'master of the household' (literally 'manage-horse'), and *tsak-tsʰrek (作册 zuòcè) 'scribe' (literally 'make-writing').

However the components of compounds were not bound morphemes: they could still be used separately. Compounding became more productive during the following Han period and has continued to the present day.

A number of bimorphemic syllables appeared in the Classical period, resulting from the fusion of words with following unstressed particles or pronouns. Thus the negatives *pjut 弗 and *mjut 勿 are viewed as fusions of the negators *pjə 不 and *mjo 毋 respectively with a third-person pronoun *tjə 之.
