= Jackson Sun (linguist) =

Taiwanese linguist

Jackson T.-S. Sun
- Born: 1956 (age 69–70); Taiwan
- Education: National Taiwan Normal University (BA, MA); University of California, Berkeley (PhD)
- Scientific career
- Fields: Linguistics
- Institutions: Academia Sinica

Jackson T.-S. Sun, also known as Jackson Tianshin Sun (Chinese: 孫天心; pinyin: Sūn Tiānxīn), is a Taiwanese linguist working on languages of the Sino-Tibetan and Austroasiatic families. He is best known for his pioneering documentation and historical-comparative work in Tani, Rgyalrongic, and Tibetic languages. Sun is a research fellow at Academia Sinica in Taipei, Taiwan.

== Biography ==
Sun was born in 1956. He earned his doctorate in Linguistics at the University of California at Berkeley in 1993, where he worked under James A. Matisoff in the Sino-Tibetan Etymological Dictionary and Thesaurus (STEDT) project on the reconstruction and classification of the Tani languages. He is currently a Distinguished Research Fellow at the Institute of Linguistics of the Academia Sinica, where he served as Director from 2008 till 2011, and a Chair Professor at the Department of English at National Taiwan Normal University. He was elected an Academician of the Academia Sinica in 2018.

== Selected publications ==
=== Journal articles and book chapters ===
- 2019. The ancestry of Horpa: Further morphological evidence. In Kong, Jiangping (ed.), Ancestry of the languages and peoples of China (Journal of Chinese Linguistics Monograph Series, Number 28). Hong Kong: The Chinese University Press.
- 2018. The Synchronic and diachronic phonology of Va: A Wa-Lawa language of Yunnan. Linguistics of the Tibeto-Burman Area 41(2), 133–174.
- 2018. Evidentials and person. In Alexandra Y. Aikhenvald (ed.), The Oxford handbook of evidentiality, 47–63. Oxford: Oxford University Press.
- 2017. (共同作者：田阡子、邱振豪)〈上東谷霍爾語的發聲態對立〉.《中國語言學報》45(1). 1-19.
- 2017. Pang phonology and vocabulary. In Sun Jingtao et al. (eds.), Frontiers in Sinitic and Sino-Tibetan linguistics: studies in the languages of China festschrift in Honor of Professor Ting Pang-Hsin on his 80th birthday, 630–650. Beijing: Social Sciences Academic Press.
- 2017. (with Mark Post). Tani languages. In Graham Thurgood & Randy J. LaPolla (eds.), The Sino-Tibetan languages, 2nd Ed., 322–337. New York: Taylor & Francis.
- 2017. Tshobdun Rgyalrong. In Graham Thurgood & Randy J. LaPolla (eds.), The Sino-Tibetan Languages, 2nd Ed., 557–571. New York: Taylor & Francis.
- 2016. (with Evans, Jonathan P. & Chiu, Chenhao & Liou, Michelle). Uvular approximation as an articulatory vowel feature. Journal of the International Phonetic Association 45(3). 1-30.
- 2016. (with Jonathan Evans). Qiang. In Rint Sybesma et al. (eds.), Encyclopedia of Chinese Language and Linguistics, 517–526. Leiden: Brill.
- 2015. 〈黑水縣沙石多嘉戎語動詞人稱範疇的特點〉. 《語言暨語言學》16(5). 731–749.
- 2014. Sino-Tibetan: Part 3 Rgyalrong. In Rochelle Lieber & Pavol Štekauer (eds.), The Oxford Handbook of Derivational Morphology, 630–650. Oxford: Oxford University Press.
- 2014. Typology of Generic-Person Marking in Tshobdun Rgyalrong. In Richard VanNess Simmons & Newell Ann Van Auken (eds.), Festschrift to Honor South Coblin: Studies in Chinese and Sino-Tibetan Linguistics: Dialect, Phonology, Transcription and Text (Language and Linguistics Monograph Series 53), 225–248. Taipei: Institute of Linguistics, Academia Sinica.
- 2014. Typology of Generic-Person Marking in Tshobdun Rgyalrong. In Simmons, Richard VanNess & Van Auken, Newell Ann (eds.), Festschrift to honor South Coblin: Studies in Chinese and Sino-Tibetan linguistics: Dialect, phonology, transcription and text (Language and Linguistics Monographs 53), 225–248. Taipei: Institute of Linguistics, Academia Sinica.
- 2014. (共同作者：田阡子)〈霍爾語格西話動詞對協初探〉.《中國語言學集刊》7(2). 221–241.
- 2013. (共同作者：余文生)〈麻窩羌語元音音系再探〉.石鋒、彭剛編,《大江東去—王士元教授八十歲賀壽文集》,135-151.香港:香港城市大學出版社.
- 2012. Complementation in Caodeng rGyalrong. Language and Linguistics 13(3). 471–498.
- 2007. The irrealis category in rGyalrong. Language and Linguistics 8(3). 797–819.
- 2006. 〈嘉戎語動詞的派生形態〉.《民族語文》4. 3-14.
- 2006. 〈草登嘉戎語的關係句〉.《語言暨語言學》7(4). 905–933.
- 2004. Verb-stem variations in Showu rGyalrong. In Lin, Ying-chin et al. (eds.), Studies on Sino-Tibetan languages: Papers in honor of Professor Hwang-Cherng Gong on His seventieth birthday, 269–296. Taipei: Institute of Linguistics, Academia Sinica.
- 2004. Verb-stem variations in Showu rGyalrong. In Ying-chin Lin et al. (eds.), Language and Linguistics: Studies on Sino-Tibetan Languages: Papers in Honor of Professor Hwang-Cherng Gong on His Seventieth Birthday, 269–296. Taipei: Institute of Linguistics, Academia Sinica.
- 2003. Phonological profile of Zhongu: A new Tibetan dialect of Northern Sichuan. Language and Linguistics 4(4). 769–836.
- 2003. Tani languages. In Graham Thurgood & Randy J. LaPolla (eds.), Sino-Tibetan languages, 456–466. London and New York: Routledge.
- 2003. Variegated tonal developments in Tibetan. In David Bradley & Randy LaPolla & Boyd Michailovsky & Graham Thurgood (eds.), Pacific Linguistics: Language Variation: Papers on Variation and Change in the Sinosphere and in the Indosphere in Honour of James A. Matisoff, 35–51. Canberra: Pacific Linguistics, Research School of Pacific and Asian Studies, ANU.
- 2003. Caodeng rGyalrong. In Graham Thurgood & Randy LaPolla (eds.), Sino-Tibetan languages, 490–502. London and New York: Routledge.
- 2002. (共同作者：石丹羅)〈草登嘉戎語與「認同等第」相關的語法現象〉.《語言暨語言學》 3(1). 79–99.
- 2000. Stem alternations in Puxi verb inflection. Language and Linguistics 1(2). 211–232.
- 2000. Parallelisms in the verb morphology of Sidaba rGyalrong and Guanyinqiao in rGyalrongic. Language and Linguistics 1(1). 161–190.
- 1993. Evidentials in Amdo Tibetan. Bulletin of the Institute of History and Philology 63(4). 143–188.

=== Books ===
- In press. Tshobdun Rgyalrong spoken texts: With a grammatical Introduction. (Language and Linguistics Monograph). Taipei: Institute of Linguistics, Academia Sinica.
- Jackson T.-S. Sun (ed.). 2014. Phonological Profiles of Little-Studied Tibetic Varieties. Language and Linguistics Monograph Series 55. Taipei: Institute of Linguistics, Academia Sinica.
- Jackson T.-S. Sun. 1993. A historical-comparative study of the Tani (Mirish) branch in Tibeto-Burman. PhD dissertation, University of California at Berkeley.
- Jackson T.-S. Sun. 1986. Aspects of the phonology of Amdo Tibetan: Ndzorge Sháme Xra dialect (Monumenta Serindica No. 16). Tokyo: Institute for the Study of Languages and Cultures of Asia and Africa.
