= Paul K. Benedict =

American physician

- Born: July 5, 1912; Poughkeepsie, New York, U.S.
- Died: July 21, 1997 (aged 85); Ormond Beach, Florida, U.S.

Academic background
- Education: Harvard University; New York Medical College

Academic work
- Main interests: Sino-Tibetan languages, languages of East Asia
- Notable works: Sino-Tibetan: A conspectus (1972)
- Influenced: James Matisoff

Chinese name
- Traditional Chinese: 白保羅
- Simplified Chinese: 白保罗
Transcriptions
Standard Mandarin
- Hanyu Pinyin: Bái Bǎoluó

Paul King Benedict (traditional Chinese: 白保羅; simplified Chinese: 白保罗; pinyin: Bái Bǎoluó; July 5, 1912 – July 21, 1997) was an American anthropologist, mental health professional, and linguist who specialized in languages of East and Southeast Asia. He is well known for his 1942 proposal of the Austro-Tai language family and also his reconstruction of Proto-Sino-Tibetan and Proto-Tibeto-Burman. He was also a practicing psychiatrist in the New York area for 20 years and was also a pioneer in the field of ethnopsychiatry.

== Life and career ==
Benedict was born in Poughkeepsie, New York and graduated from Poughkeepsie High School in 1930. He attended Cornell University before transferring to University of New Mexico, earning a bachelor of arts degree there in 1934. He then attended Harvard University earning a master's degree in 1935 and a Ph.D. in anthropology in 1941. During his studies, he traveled to Asia and studied at University of California for two years.

After he received his M.D. degree at the New York Medical College, he served as Chief Psychiatrist and Director of the Diagnostic Center at the New York State Department of Corrections. Benedict later published work on mental health in other cultures before turning his attention to language studies.

Benedict's work on Proto-Sino-Tibetan reconstruction was published in the 1972 monograph Sino-Tibetan: A Conspectus. His work formed the basis for James Matisoff's work on the Sino-Tibetan Etymological Dictionary and Thesaurus, including Matisoff's Proto-Tibeto-Burman reconstructions.

Benedict died in a traffic collision in Ormond Beach, Florida.

== Selected publications ==
- Benedict, Paul K. (1942). "Thai, Kadai, and Indonesian: A new alignment in South-Eastern Asia" American Anthropologist 44.576-601.
- Benedict, Paul K. (1972). Sino-Tibetan: A Conspectus. Cambridge: Cambridge University Press.
- Benedict, Paul K. (1975). Austro-Thai language and culture, with a glossary of roots. New Haven: HRAF Press. ISBN 0-87536-323-7.
- Benedict, Paul K. (1990). Japanese/Austro-Tai. Ann Arbor: Karoma. ISBN 0-89720-078-0.
- Benedict, Paul K. “Remarks on A Comparative Vocabulary of Five Sino-Tibetan Languages, by Ilia Peiros and Sergei A. Starostin.” Mother Tongue 4:151-2.
- Benedict, Paul K., Graham Thurgood, and James A. Matisoff, and David Bradley (eds.). 1985. Linguistics of the Sino-Tibetan area: the state of the art: papers presented to Paul K. Benedict for his 71st birthday. Canberra: Pacific Linguistics.
- Benedict, Paul K. 1997. Special volume dedicated to Dr. Paul K. Benedict on the occasion of his eighty-fifth birthday (Mon-Khmer Studies, vol. 27). Salaya, Thailand: Mahidol University; Dallas, TX: Summer Institute of Linguistics.
