= Anna Källén =

Swedish archaeologist and critical heritage theorist

Anna Källén (born 18 November 1973) is a Swedish archaeologist and critical heritage theorist. As of 2024 she is professor and chair of Museology at the Department of Culture and Media Studies at Umeå University. Previously affiliated to Stockholm University, Källén is known for her work in the fields of archaeology, cultural history and cultural studies, and ancient DNA research.

== Academic career ==
As a student of archaeology, Källén began working in Southeast Asia in the mid-1990s. Her 2004 dissertation from Uppsala University was based on archaeological excavations in the site Lao Pako in Laos. Källén's work in Laos and other Southeast Asian countries drew her towards questions about the uses and appropriations of archaeological heritage in contemporary societies. After completing her PhD, Källén moved to Stockholm University, where she pursued postdoctoral research in critical heritage studies. In 2023, Källén was appointed Professor and Chair of Museology at Umeå University.

== Research ==
Källén's research is located at the intersections of archaeology, cultural studies and critical heritage studies. Identifying with post-processual archaeology, she challenges the idea of archaeology as an "objective" science and instead stresses the historical contingency of archaeological knowledge production.

In books like Stones Standing: Archaeology, Colonialism and Ecotourism in Northern Laos (2015) and articles like "Hintang and the Dilemma of Benevolence" (2012), Källén explores the relations between heritage, colonialism and hegemonic power. She is particularly interested in how lingering social and political structures from 19th and early-20th century European imperialism continue to inform present-day heritage practices, often reproducing colonialist and orientalist notions of time, history and race. Theoretically, Källén is inspired by postcolonial theory as well as feminist scholars like Donna Haraway.

In The Archaeologist In-Between: Olov Janse 1892–1985 (2021), Källén and archaeologist Johan Hegardt investigates the life and work of Olov Janse, a Swedish archaeologist whose collections from excavations in French Indochina during the 1930s have long been displayed at Östasiatiska muséet in Stockholm.

From 2018 onwards, Källén has pursued critical research about the field of ancient DNA studies. As Källén and historian of ideas Daniel Strand suggest in their introduction to the volume Critical Perspectives on Ancient DNA (2024), DNA does not offer a source of objective truth about the past. Questioning the positivist notion of DNA as a "passive artifact of the past, just waiting to be uncovered by cutting-edge scientists", they argue that scientists must use socially constructed names, labels, categories and narratives to create and communicate meaningful stories.

In 2025, Källén published The Trouble with Ancient DNA: Telling Stories of the Past with Genomic Science. In the book, she scrutinizes the storytelling techniques which underpin ancient DNA research and argues that the narratives produced by archaeogenetics are closely interwoven with contemporary political agendas and cultural conceptions of race and identity.

== Selected publications ==
- Källén, Anna; Karlström, Anna (1999). Lao Pako. Oxford: British Archaeological Reports Oxford Limited. ISBN 978-0-86054-995-6.
- European Association of Southeast Asian Archaeologists (2003). Fishbones and glittering emblems: Southeast Asian archaeology 2002. Stockholm: Museum of Far Eastern Antiquities (Östasiatiska museet. ISBN 978-91-970616-0-5.
- And Through Flows the River: Archaeology and the Pasts of Lao Pako (PhD dissertation), 2004. Uppsala: Uppsala University.
- Stones Standing: Archaeology, Colonialism and Ecotourism in Northern Laos. UCL Critical Heritage Studies Series, 2015. Walnut Creek: Left Coast Press.
- "The Invisible Archaeologist: Letters from the UNESCO secretariat 1946–1947". Journal of Social Archaeology, 14:3, 2014.
- The Trouble with Ancient DNA: Telling Stories of the Past with Genomic Science (2025). Chicago: The University of Chicago Press.
