= Randy LaPolla =

American linguist (born 1951)

Randy J. LaPolla

Academic background
- Education: SUNY Stony Brook (B.A.); University of California, Berkeley (M.A., Ph.D.)
- Thesis: Grammatical Relations in Chinese: Synchronic and Diachronic Considerations (1990)
- Doctoral advisor: James Matisoff, Robert Van Valin

Academic work
- Institutions: Nanyang Technological University; Beijing Normal University Zhuhai campus
- Main interests: Chinese linguistics, Sino-Tibetan linguistics

Chinese name
- Traditional Chinese: 羅仁地
- Simplified Chinese: 罗仁地
Transcriptions
Standard Mandarin
- Hanyu Pinyin: Luó Réndì
- Website: randylapolla.info

Randy John LaPolla (Chinese: 羅仁地; pinyin: Luó Réndì) is a professor and former Head of Division at the Division of Linguistics and Multilingual Studies in Nanyang Technological University. He is also a Fellow of the Australian Academy of the Humanities, elected 2008. He is currently Professor of Linguistics at the Center for Language Sciences at Beijing Normal University's Zhuhai campus, and Associate Fellow of CLASS, Nanyang Technological University.

LaPolla has done research in various areas of linguistics. He has worked on the typology and morphosyntactic patterns of Sino-Tibetan languages, examined methodology for carrying out linguistic work in these languages and also done language documentation in Qiang and Dulong/Rawang. He is well known as the author of a grammar of Qiang (LaPolla and Huang 2003) and as the coauthor of Van Valin and LaPolla (1997), a major work in Role and Reference Grammar.

As a doctoral student at the University of California, Berkeley, LaPolla was part of James Matisoff's STEDT project. He obtained his Ph.D. in 1990 at the University of California, Berkeley. He was first a researcher at the Academia Sinica from 1990 to 1998, then was an associate professor at the City University of Hong Kong from 1996 to 2004. From 2004 to 2012 he was the Chair of Linguistics (Chair Professor) at La Trobe University. A Cheung Kong Scholar from 2005 to 2008, he also led the Australian Linguistic Society as its President from 2007 to 2009.

== Selected publications ==
- A Grammar of Qiang, with Annotated Texts and Glossary (Mouton Grammar Library 31), by Randy J. LaPolla, with Chenglong Huang. Berlin: Mouton de Gruyter, 445 + xvii pp., Dec. 2003 (ISBN 3-11-017829-X).
- The Sino-Tibetan Languages (Routledge Language Family Series 3), edited by Graham Thurgood & Randy J. LaPolla. London & New York: Routledge, 727 + xxii pp., Jan. 2003 (ISBN 0-7007-1129-5). Paperback version released April 2007 (ISBN 978-0-415-77295-2).
- Rawang Texts, with Grammatical Analysis and English Translation, by Randy J. LaPolla & Dory Poa. Muenchen: LINCOM EUROPA, December 2001 (ISBN 3 89586 783 7).
- Syntax: Structure, Meaning, and Function (Cambridge Textbooks in Linguistics Series), by Robert D. Van Valin, Jr. & Randy J. LaPolla. Cambridge University Press, 1997 (ISBN 9780521499156).
