= Hugh M. Stimson =

American linguist

Hugh McBirney Stimson
- Born: December 5, 1931; Port Chester, New York, United States
- Died: January 24, 2011 (aged 79); Hamden, Connecticut, United States
- Known for: Study of Tang poetry
- Scientific career
- Fields: Linguistics
- Institutions: Yale University

Hugh McBirney Stimson (December 5, 1931 – January 24, 2011) was an American sinologist and linguist who specialised in the poetry of the Tang dynasty (618–907). He was particularly known for his research into Chinese historical phonology which enabled him to reconstruct the spoken language of Tang poetry.

== Biography ==
Stimson was born in Port Chester, New York in 1931, the nephew of US Secretary of War Henry L. Stimson. He studied for his undergraduate degree at Yale University, where he was a prestigious "scholar of the house" in his final year. After graduating in 1953 he stayed on at Yale to study towards a PhD, spending a year at the National Taiwan University during 1954–1955. His dissertation, completed in 1959, was a study of the Old Mandarin phonological system documented in the Zhongyuan Yinyun. After spending a year as assistant director of the Foreign Service Institute in Taiwan (1959–1960), he took up a position at Yale University, in the Department of East Asian Languages and Literatures and the Department Linguistics. He remained at Yale for his entire academic career, retiring in 2006 after forty-six years teaching at the university. During his time at Yale University he served several times as chair of the Department of East Asian Languages and Literatures and as director of undergraduate studies. He was president of the American Oriental Society for a period during the 1970s.

== Works ==
- 1966. The Jongyuan in Yunn: a guide to old Mandarin pronunciation. Yale University, Far Eastern Publications.
- 1972. One Thousand Chinese Characters with Literary Glosses. Yale University, Far Eastern Publications.
- 1975. Introduction to Chinese Pronunciation and the Pīnyīn Romanization. Yale University, Far Eastern Publications. ISBN 9780887100345
- 1976. T'ang Poetic Vocabulary. Yale University, Far Eastern Publications.
- 1976. Fifty-Five T'ang Poems: A Text in the Reading and Understanding of T'ang Poetry. Yale University, Far Eastern Publications. ISBN 9780887100260

In addition to his research on Chinese philology and poetry, Stimson contributed to a series of text books on Spoken Standard Chinese (1976–1978) and Written Standard Chinese (1980–1991), as well as a number of other pedagogical texts for teaching Mandarin Chinese.
