= Minor syllable =

Reduced syllable followed by a full tonic or stressed syllable

Primarily in Austroasiatic languages (also known as Mon–Khmer), in a typical word, a minor syllable, presyllable, or sesquisyllable, is a reduced (minor) syllable followed by a full tonic or stressed syllable. The minor syllable may be of the form /Cə/ or /CəN/, with a reduced vowel, as in colloquial Khmer, or of the form /CC/ with no vowel at all, as in Mlabri /kn̩diːŋ/ 'navel' (minor syllable /kn̩/) and /br̩poːŋ/ 'underneath' (minor syllable /br̩/), and Khasi kyndon /kn̩dɔːn/ 'rule' (minor syllable /kn̩/), syrwet /sr̩wɛt̚/ 'sign' (minor syllable /sr̩/), kylla /kl̩la/ 'transform' (minor syllable /kl̩/), symboh /sm̩bɔːʔ/ 'seed' (minor syllable /sm̩/) and tyngkai /tŋ̩kaːɪ/ 'conserve' (minor syllable /tŋ̩/).

This iambic pattern is sometimes called sesquisyllabic (lit. 'one and a half syllables'), a term coined by the American linguist James Matisoff in 1973 (Matisoff 1973:86). Although the term may be applied to any word with an iambic structure, it is more narrowly defined as a syllable with a consonant cluster whose phonetic realization is [CǝC].

== In historical linguistics ==
Sometimes minor syllables are introduced by language contact. Many Chamic languages as well as Burmese have developed minor syllables from contact with Mon-Khmer family. In Burmese, minor syllables have the form /Cə/, with no consonant clusters allowed in the syllable onset, no syllable coda, and no tone.

Some reconstructions of Proto-Tai and Old Chinese also include sesquisyllabic roots with minor syllables, as transitional forms between fully disyllabic words and the monosyllabic words found in modern Tai languages and modern Chinese.

== See also ==
- Mainland Southeast Asia linguistic area
- Stress in Khmer
