= Linguistics of the Tibeto-Burman Area =

- Discipline: Linguistics
- Language: English
- Edited by: David Bradley

Publication details
- History: 1974–present
- Publisher: John Benjamins Publishing Company
- Frequency: Biannually

Standard abbreviations
- ISO 4: Linguist. Tibeto-Burman Area

Indexing
- ISSN: 0731-3500 (print); 2214-5907 (web)
- LCCN: 82640813
- OCLC no.: 1019987917

Links
- Journal homepage

Linguistics of the Tibeto-Burman Area is a biannual peer-reviewed academic journal covering research on the Sino-Tibetan languages and other mainland Southeast Asian languages. It was established in 1974 and was closely associated with the Sino-Tibetan Etymological Dictionary and Thesaurus project led by James A. Matisoff until the project's end in 2015. Starting from volume 37 (2014), it has been published by John Benjamins Publishing Company. The journal is abstracted and indexed in Scopus.

== See also ==
- Journal of the Southeast Asian Linguistics Society
- Oceanic Linguistics
