= David Bradley (linguist) =

American linguist

David Bradley FAHA

Academic background
- Education: SOAS, University of London

Academic work
- Institutions: La Trobe University
- Main interests: Sino-Tibetan linguistics, Lolo-Burmese languages

David Bradley FAHA is a linguist who specializes in the Tibeto-Burman languages of Southeast Asia. Born in the United States, Bradley was educated at the SOAS, University of London. He has spent most of his career in Australia and is currently professor emeritus at La Trobe University. Bradley has been an invited lecturer and keynote speaker many times and throughout the world, in particular the Himalayan Languages Symposium and the International Conference on Sino-Tibetan Languages and Linguistics.

He is also the chief editor of the journal Linguistics of the Tibeto-Burman Area. He was elected a Fellow of the Australian Academy of the Humanities in 2004.
