= James Matisoff =

American linguist (born 1937)

- Born: James Alan Matisoff; July 14, 1937 (age 89); Boston, Massachusetts, U.S.
- Spouse: Susan Matisoff

Academic background
- Education: Harvard University (BA, MA); International Christian University; University of California, Berkeley (PhD)
- Thesis: A Grammar of the Lahu Language (1967)

Academic work
- Discipline: Linguistics
- Institutions: University of California, Berkeley
- Notable students: Randy LaPolla
- Main interests: Sino-Tibetan languages
- Notable works: Sino-Tibetan Etymological Dictionary and Thesaurus (STEDT)
- Notable ideas: Tonogenesis; rhinoglottophilia; sesquisyllables; graphic pejoratives

Chinese name
- Traditional Chinese: 馬蒂索夫/馬提索夫
- Simplified Chinese: 马蒂索夫/马提索夫
Transcriptions
Standard Mandarin
- Hanyu Pinyin: Mǎdìsuǒfū/Mǎtísuǒfū

James Alan Matisoff (simplified Chinese: 马蒂索夫; traditional Chinese: 馬蒂索夫; pinyin: Mǎdìsuǒfū or simplified Chinese: 马提索夫; traditional Chinese: 馬提索夫; pinyin: Mǎtísuǒfū; born July 14, 1937) is an American linguist. He is a professor emeritus of linguistics at the University of California, Berkeley. He is a noted authority on Tibeto-Burman languages and other languages of mainland Southeast Asia.

== Early life and education ==
Matisoff was born July 14, 1937, in Boston, Massachusetts, to a working-class family of Russian Jewish origins. His father, a fish seller, was an immigrant from a town near Minsk, Byelorussian SSR (now Belarus).

He attended Harvard from 1954 to 1959, where he met his wife, Susan Matisoff, later a scholar of Japanese literature, when the two shared a Japanese class. He received two degrees from Harvard: an AB in Romance Languages and Literatures (1958) and an AM in French Literature (1959). He then studied Japanese at International Christian University from 1960 to 1961.

He undertook his doctoral studies in linguistics at the University of California, Berkeley, where Mary Haas, co-founder of the department, was then chair. Haas had been a student of Edward Sapir while at University of Chicago and Yale University, and through her own extensive research in descriptive and documentary linguistics had become a specialist in Native American languages and an authority on Thai. Haas was instrumental in Matisoff's decision to research a language of mainland Southeast Asia for his dissertation.

Matisoff's doctoral dissertation was a grammar of the Lahu language, a Tibeto-Burman language belonging to the Loloish branch of the family. He spent a year in northern Thailand doing field work on Lahu during his graduate studies with support from a Fulbright-Hays Fellowship. He completed his PhD in Linguistics in 1967, and made several field studies thereafter through an American Council of Learned Societies fellowship. His Grammar of Lahu is notable both for its depth of detail and the theoretical eclecticism which informed his description of the language. He later published an extensive dictionary of Lahu (1988) and a corresponding English-Lahu lexicon (2006).

== Career ==
After four years teaching at Columbia University (1966–1969), Matisoff accepted a professorship at Berkeley. At Berkeley, his research has encompassed a wide range of topics, from historical and comparative linguistics to tonal phenomena, variational semantics, language contact, Yiddish, and Tibeto-Burman morphosyntax. Before his retirement, he taught classes on the Linguistics of Southeast Asia, Tibeto-Burman Linguistics, Historical Semantics, Morphology, and Field Methods. In Field Methods, graduate students learn the methods of language description through eliciting data from a native speaker. The languages studied in Matisoff’s field methods classes in different years include: Lai Chin, Sherpa, and Uighur, among numerous others.

He edited the journal Linguistics of the Tibeto-Burman Area for many years (subsequently edited by his student Randy LaPolla, then by LaPolla's student Alec Coupe). Matisoff participated in establishing the International Conference on Sino-Tibetan Languages and Linguistics (abbreviated ICSTLL), an annual conference held since 1968.

=== Coined terms ===
Matisoff has coined a number of terms used in linguistics, including tonogenesis, rhinoglottophilia, Sinosphere and Indosphere, Cheshirisation, which refers to the trace remains of an otherwise disappeared sound in a word, and sesquisyllabic to describe the iambic stress pattern of words in languages spoken in Southeast Asia, such as the Mon–Khmer languages.

In a 1990 paper criticizing Joseph Greenberg's tendency to lump when classifying languages, Matisoff humorously coined the term columbicubiculomania (from columbi + cubiculo + mania), which he defined as "a compulsion to stick things into pigeonholes, to leave nothing unclassified."

=== STEDT ===
In 1987, Matisoff began the Sino-Tibetan Etymological Dictionary and Thesaurus (STEDT) project, an historical linguistics project aimed at producing an etymological dictionary of Sino-Tibetan organized by semantic field. The project maintains a large, publicly accessible lexical database of nearly one million records with data on Sino-Tibetan languages from over 500 sources. This database is used to identify and mark cognates for the purposes of better understanding the historical development of the Sino-Tibetan language family and the subgroupings of the languages therein, and to reconstruct the theoretical proto-language of the language family, Proto-Sino-Tibetan.

Matisoff has authored two monographs so far presenting results from the STEDT project: The Tibeto-Burman Reproductive System: Toward an Etymological Thesaurus (2008) and The Handbook of Proto-Tibeto-Burman (2003, 800 p.).

Although Matisoff retired from Berkeley in 2002, he continues to publish extensively and was Principal Investigator for the STEDT project until its end in 2015. In 2015, the final print and software releases for STEDT were disseminated to the public, concluding the decades-long Sino-Tibetan Etymological Dictionary and Thesaurus (STEDT).

== See also ==
- Proto-Tibeto-Burman language

== Bibliography ==
- Matisoff, J. (1970). "Glottal dissimilation and the Lahu high-rising tone: A tonogenetic case-study". Journal of the American Oriental Society. 90 (1): 13–44. doi:10.2307/598429. JSTOR 598429.
- Matisoff, J. (1972). "Lahu nominalization, relativization, and genitivization". John Kimball, (ed.), Syntax and Semantics, Vol. 1, 237-57. Studies in Language Series. New York: Seminar Press.
- Matisoff, J. (1972). The Loloish tonal split revisited.
- Matisoff, J. (1973). "Tonogenesis in Southeast Asia". Larry M. Hyman, (ed.), Consonant Types and Tone, 71-95. Southern California Occasional Papers in Linguistics, No. 1. Los Angeles: UCLA.
- Matisoff, J. (1973). The grammar of Lahu, 2 ed. 1982.
- Matisoff, J. (1975). "Rhinoglottophilia: The mysterious connection between nasality and glottality". Charles Ferguson, Larry M. Hyman, and John Ohala, (eds.), Nasálfest: Papers from a Symposium on Nasals and Nasalization, 265-87. Stanford, California: Stanford University Language Universals Project.
- Matisoff, J. (1978). Variational semantics in Tibeto-Burman: The 'organic' approach to linguistic comparison.
- Matisoff, J. (1979). Blessings, curses, hopes, and fears: Psycho-ostensive expressions in Yiddish, 2 ed., 2000.
- Matisoff, J. (1988). The dictionary of Lahu.
- Matisoff, J. (1990). "On megalocomparison". Language. 66 (1): 106–20. doi:10.2307/415281. JSTOR 415281.
- Matisoff, J. (1991). "Areal and universal dimensions of grammatization in Lahu." Elizabeth C. Traugott & Bernd Heine (eds.), Approaches to Grammaticalization, 1991, Vol. II, 383–453.
- Matisoff, J. (1991). "Jiburish revisisted". Acta Orientalia. 52: 91–114.
- Matisoff, J. (1997). Sino-Tibetan Numeral Systems: prefixes, protoforms and problems, 1997.
- Matisoff, J. (2003). Handbook of Proto-Tibeto-Burman: system and philosophy of Sino-Tibetan reconstruction.
- Matisoff, J. (2003). "Lahu". Graham Thurgood and Randy LaPolla, (eds.), The Sino-Tibetan Languages, 208-221. London and New York: Routledge.
- Matisoff, J. (2003). "Southeast Asian Languages". William Frawley and Bernard Comrie, (eds.), International Encyclopedia of Linguistics, 2nd Edition, Vol. IV, 126-130. New York and Oxford: Oxford University Press.
- Matisoff, J. (2006). English-Lahu Lexicon. University of California Publications in Linguistics, Vol. 139. Berkeley, Los Angeles, London: University of California Press.
- Matisoff, J. (2008). The Tibeto-Burman Reproductive System: Toward an Etymological Thesaurus. With comments on Chinese comparanda by Zev J. Handel. University of California Publications in Linguistics, Vol 140. Berkeley, Los Angeles, London: University of California Press.
