= Neua language =

Tai language of Laos

Neua
- Tai Nuea • Thay Neua • Xamneua Lao
- Native to: Laos
- Language family: Kra–Dai: Tai; Southwestern; Chiang Saen?; Neua

Language codes
- ISO 639-3: None (mis)

Neua, also known as Tai Nuea, Thay Neua, or Xamneua Lao, is a Tai language primarily spoken in Houaphanh province, Laos. It is closely related to the Phuan language and should not be confused with the similarly-named Tai Nuea language of Yunnan and Luang Namtha.

The Tai Neua were formerly considered to be a separate ethnic group during the French colonial period. Today, speakers of Neua are considered to be part of the Lao ethnic group.

== Classification ==
According to Chamberlain (1975), Neua falls under the /ph/ group of Southwestern Tai languages, where Neua, Phuan, and Siamese (Thai) form one sub-group, while Lao and Southern Thai form another sub-group. From there, he suggests that "Old Neua" branched off from the "Ayutthaya" (Old Thai) language around the 12th century, then further branched off into the modern Neua, Phuan, Phu Thai, and Tai Yo languages.
