= Tai Daeng =

Tai Daeng (or Red Tai) can refer to:

- Tai Daeng language, a Tai language of northern Vietnam
- Tai Daeng people, an ethnic group of Vietnam
