= Sapa language =

Southwestern Tai language of Vietnam

Sapa
- Tày Sa Pa
- Native to: Vietnam
- Region: Sa Pa
- Ethnicity: Tày
- Native speakers: 300 (2002)
- Language family: Kra–Dai: Tai; Southwestern; Sapa
- Writing system: Latin (Vietnamese alphabet)

Language codes
- ISO 639-3: tys
- Glottolog: tays1238
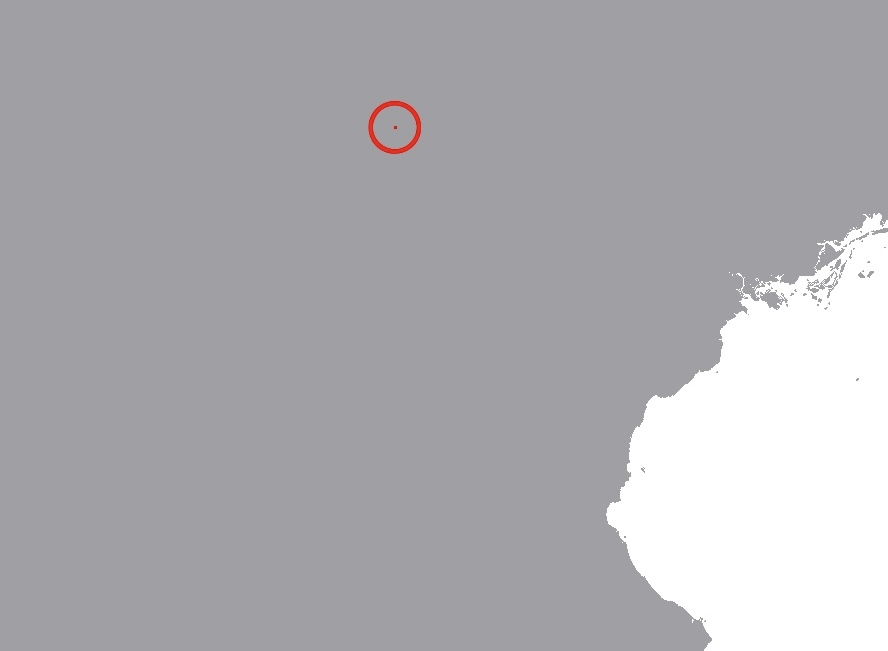

Sapa, or Tày Sa Pa, is a Southwestern Tai language of Sa Pa, Lào Cai Province, northern Vietnam. According to Pittayaporn (2009) and Glottolog, it is the closest relative of the Southwestern Tai languages, but does not share the phonological innovations that define that group. There are about 300 speakers. Tày Sa Pa speakers are classified by the Vietnamese as ethnic Tay people, most of whom speak Central Tai languages rather than Southwestern Tai languages. According to Jerold Edmondson, the phonology, tones, and lexicon of Tày Sa Pa is similar to that of Standard Thai.

A similar Southwestern Tai language called Padi [pa˧˩ zi˧˩] is spoken in Mường Khương District, Lao Cai Province, northern Vietnam.

== Sources ==
- Bùi Quốc Khánh. 2013. Tri thức dân gian trong canh tác cây lúa nước của người Pa Dí ở Lào Cai. Nhà xuất bản Thời Đại. ISBN 978-604-930-596-2
- Pittayaporn, Pittayawat, 2007. Tai dialects of Northern Vietnam: Sapa, Vinh Yen, and Cao Bang (Kra-Dai).
