= Phuan =

Phuan may refer to:

- Phuan language
- Phuan people
