= Tai Muong Vat language =

Southwestern Tai language of Vietnam

Tai Muong Vat
- Native to: Vietnam
- Language family: Kra–Dai: Tai; Southwestern (Thai); Northwestern?; Tai Muong Vat

Language codes
- ISO 639-3: None (mis)
- Glottolog: None

Tai Muong Vat (Vietnamese: Tiếng Thái Mường Vạt) is a Southwestern Tai language spoken in Yên Châu District, Sơn La Province, northwestern Vietnam. Tai Muong Vat is described in Theraphan Luang-Thongkum (2003). Theraphan's (2003) Tai Muong Vat data was collected in the following 2 villages.

- Bản Phat, Tú Nang Commune, Yên Châu District, Sơn La Province, Vietnam
- Bản Coc Lac, Chiềng Pằn Commune, Yên Châu District, Sơn La Province, Vietnam

== Classification ==
Theraphan (2003) points out that Tai Muong Vat is not the same as the Tai Dam (Black Thai) language, even though the Tai Muong Vat are surrounded by Tai Dam speakers in Yên Châu District, Vietnam. This was first noted by Chamberlain (1984), who suggests that it may be more closely related to the Tai Neua variety of Xieng Kho, Laos than to Tai Dam of Son La, Vietnam. Tai Dam is the dominant language in Yên Châu, while Ksingmul, a Khmuic language, is also spoken in both Yên Châu and Xieng Kho. As a result, the Tai Muong Vat and Ksingmul share many cultural customs with the Tai Dam, and have similar ethnic dress as well (Theraphan 2003).

Additionally, like Lao, Tai Muong Vat is a /ph/-type language, rather than a /p/-type language like Tai Dam (Theraphan 2003) (see Southwestern Tai languages#Chamberlain (1975)).

Theraphan (2003:78) lists the following lexical differences between Tai Muong Vat and Tai Dam. (Note: For an explanation of the notation system for Tai tones, see Proto-Tai language#Tones.)

Gloss	Tai Muong Vat	Old Black Tai
to shoot	ɲiŋ A2	*bɛn B1
to crave for	zaak DL1	*ʔɛ B1
cheap	hɛ A1	*tʰuʔ D1
gun	tʰuŋ B1	*ʔoŋ B1
to practice	tʰɤp DS2	*ʔɛp D1
spear	caw B1	*hɔʔ D1
soaking wet	mɯk DS1	*cɯm A2
small basket	sa-lɔ C1	*sɔŋ C1
to fan	pʰɤŋ A2	*vi ~ bi A2
dip-net	viŋ A1	*ka-sa A1
