= Red Tai language =

Red Tai language can mean the following,

- Tai Daeng language
- Tai Laing language
