= Dai Zhuang language =

Tai language spoken in China and Vietnam

Dai Zhuang
- Wen-Ma Southern Zhuang
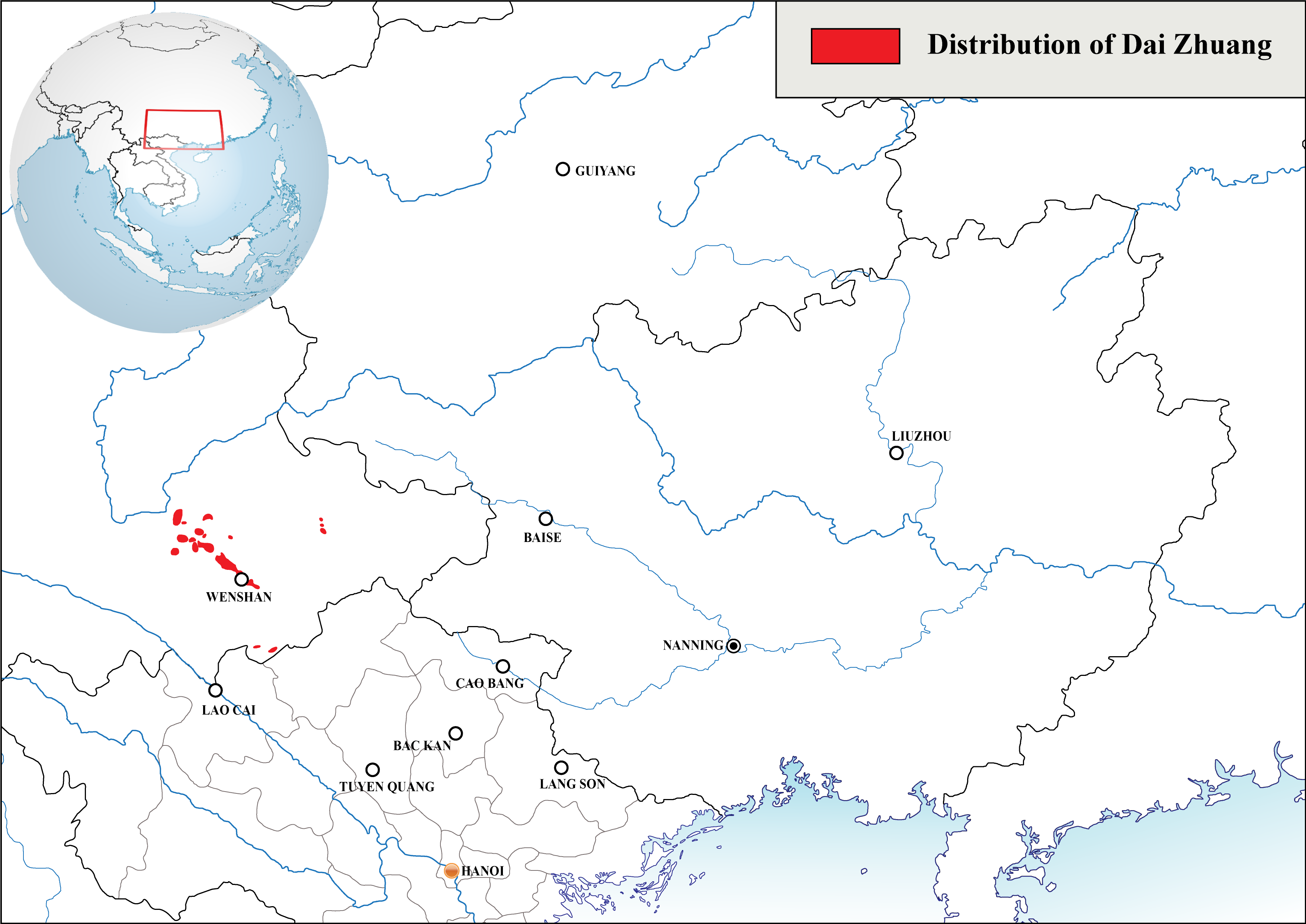
- Distribution of Dai Zhuang language
- Native to: China
- Region: Wenshan Prefecture
- Native speakers: 100,000 (2008)
- Language family: Kra–Dai: Tai; Central Tai; Dai Zhuang

Language codes
- ISO 639-3: Either: zhd – Dai Zhuang tyl – Thu Lao (duplicate code)
- Glottolog: daiz1235
- ELP: Thu Lao

Dai Zhuang or Thu Lao is a Tai language spoken in Yunnan, China and northern Vietnam. In China is it spoken in Yanshan, Wenshan, Maguan, Malipo, Guangnan counties of Wenshan Prefecture. It is also spoken in Honghe Prefecture. The largest concentrations are in Wenshan (50% of total Zhuang population) and Yanshan (20% of total Zhuang population) counties (Johnson 2011b).

== Names ==
Below are various names (both autonyms and exonyms) for speakers of Dai Zhuang (Johnson 2011a:43).

- Pu Dai (濮岱)
  - Dai Zhuang pronunciation: [pʰu55 ʔdaːi31, pʰu22 taːi11]
- Tuliao, Tulao (土僚、土老)
- Tuzu (土族)
- Pulao, Puliao (濮僚; ancient Chinese ethnonym)

== Subdivisions and distribution ==
Johnson (2011b) splits Dai Zhuang into 4 dialects according to tonal splitting patterns: Northern, Central, Southern, and Northeastern. They roughly correspond with the following ethnic subdivisions (Johnson 2011a).

- Northern: Piled Headdress Tu (Da Tou Tu, 搭头土, Daigelai, Black Tulao). Spoken in northern Wenshan and western Yanshan counties.
- Central: Flat Headdress Tu (Ping Tou Tu, 平头土, River Bank Tulao). Spoken around the city of Wenshan, and in central Wenshan County's Panzhihua (攀枝花) Township.
- Southern: Pointed Headdress Tu (Jian Tou Tu, 尖头土). Spoken in Malipo and Maguan counties.
- Northeastern: Slanted Headdress Tu (Pian Tou Tu, 偏头土). Spoken in Guangnan and eastern Yanshan counties.

In Vietnam, Thu Lao (autonym: La Hừ, meaning 'black earth') is spoken in the following 7 villages (Nguyễn 2014:14).

- Mường Khương District, Lào Cai Province
  - Tả Gia Khâu Commune
    - La Hờ (48 households, 228 individuals)
    - La Măng (26 households, 123 individuals)
    - Lũng Thắng (15 households, 71 individuals)
  - Tào Túng, Thanh Bình Commune, Mường Khương District, Lào Cai Province (5 households, 28 individuals)
- Si Ma Cai District, Lào Cai Province
  - Sin Chải, Thảo Chư Phìn Commune (42 households, 199 individuals)
  - Khuốn Pống, Bản Mộ Commune (29 households, 138 individuals)
  - Tả Chải, Nàn Sán Commune (71 households, 337 individuals)

Jerold Edmondson describes Thu Lao as a Central Tai language with about 200 speakers that retains voiced initial consonants in low tones, like Tay of Trùng Khánh District, Cao Bằng Province.

Yunnan (1979) reports that a Tai-speaking group called the Baiyi 摆彝 live in Wenshan City, Maguan County, and Qiaotou Township 桥头苗族壮族乡 of Hekou Yao Autonomous County. Yunnan (1979) suggests that it may be similar to Tai Lue. The Baiyi are classified as ethnic Dai in Hekou, and as Zhuang in Wenshan and Maguan. In 1960, the Baiyi had a population of 6,958.

== Phonology ==
Many Dai Zhuang dialects preserve voiced stops inherited from Proto-Tai (L-Thongkum 1997). L-Thongkum calls the dialects with the voiced stops "Dai Tho," and the dialects without any voiced stops "Tai Tho."

=== Consonants ===
Thu Lao initial consonants
		Bilabial	Alveolar	Palatal	Velar	Glottal
Plosive	voiceless	p	t	c	k	ʔ
Plosive	aspirated	pʰ	tʰ	cʰ	kʰ	
Plosive	voiced	b	d	ɟ	g	
Fricative	voiceless		θ	(ɕ)		h
Fricative	voiced	v	ð		ɣ	
Nasal		m	n	ɳ	ŋ	
Liquid			l	j		
Affricate			(tɕ~s)			

Thu Lao final consonants
	Bilabial	Alveolar	Palatal	Velar	Glottal
Plosive		t		k	
Nasal		n		ŋ	
Liquid	w		j	ɰ	

=== Vowels ===
Thu Lao vowels
	Front	Back
Close	i	u
Mid	e	o
Open	a	ɔ

=== Tones ===
Thu Lao has five tones:

1. mid-high-falling
2. low
3. high/high-rising
4. mid
5. mid-low-rising

== See also ==
- Tày language of Vietnam
