= Phuan people =

Thai ethnic group

Phuan
ພວນ, พวน
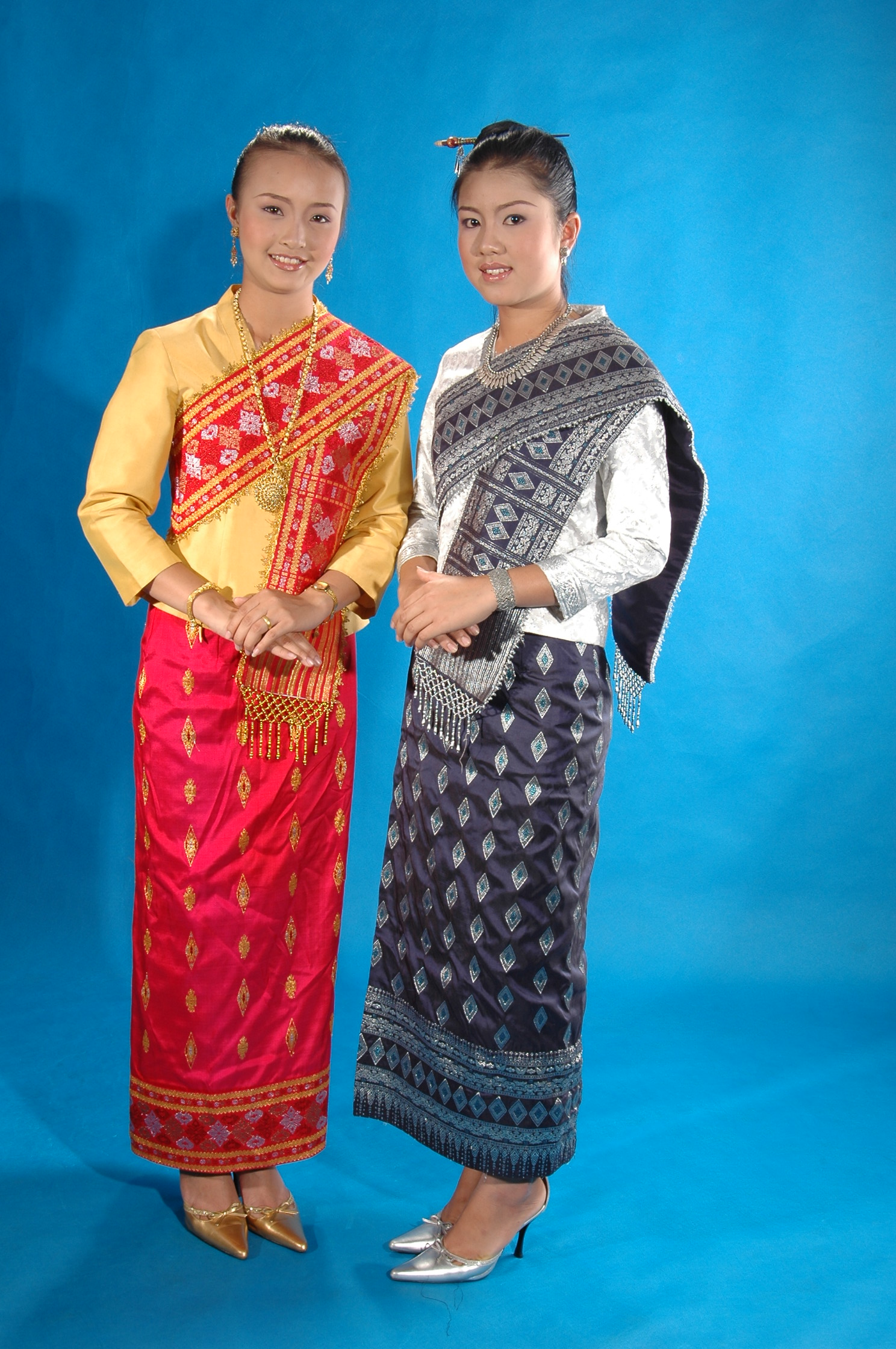
- Young Phuan women in traditional clothing. (Though Phuan have been absorbed into main Lao culture, this is not traditional Phuan clothing)

Total population
- 306,000 (SIL)

Regions with significant populations
- Thailand: 200,000
- Laos: 100,000
- Cambodia: 5,000

Languages
- Phuan, Thai, Lao, Isan, Lanna

Religion
- Theravada Buddhism, Tai folk religion

Related ethnic groups
- Tai people, Tai Lao, Tai Isan, Tai Thai

The Phuan people (Lao: ພວນ, Phouan, pronounced [pʰúan]; Thai: พวน), also known as Tai Phuan, Thai Puan (Lao: ໄຕພວນ, ໄທພວນ; Thai: ไทพวน) or Lao Phuan (Lao: ລາວພວນ), are a Theravada Buddhist Tai people who inhabit Xiangkhouang, Laos, and are spread out in small pockets across Thailand and Laos. There are also approximately 5000 Phuan in the Mongkol Borei District of Banteay Meanchey Province in Cambodia, as well in Battambang Province. According to the Ethnologue Report, the Phuan number 204,704 and that is split fairly evenly between populations in Laos and Thailand.

== History ==
The Phuan settled in the Plain of Jars after they had gained control of it from the original inhabitants (presumably Khmu people). There they formed the tribal principality of Mueang Phuan or Xieng Khouang also Siang Khwang. Legend has it that it was founded by Chet Cheuang, the youngest son of the mythical progenitor of the Tai peoples, Khun Borom. Muang Phuan fought for its independence for a long time, but was at times obliged to pay tribute by various overlords. After the conquest by Fa Ngum around 1350, Muang Phuan belonged to the mandala (sphere of influence) of Lan Xang most of the time. A revolt against the hegemony of Lan Xang has been documented around 1651/52, when the Phuan prince at that time refused to give his daughter to King Sourigna Vongsa of Lan Xang. His army then devastated the land of the Phuan and abducted about 500 families into his direct domain.

After the division of Lan Xang in 1707, Muang Phuan was the subject of battles for supremacy between Siam, Vietnam and the Laotian states in the 19th century. Thousands of Phuan families were deported as workers by the victorious armies, including to the Central Laotian Mekong Valley in today's Bolikhamsai Province and to northeast Thailand.

The British Vice Consul in Chiang Mai, Edward Blencowe Gould, described the forced relocation of Phuan from the Plain of Jars in 1876:

The captives were hurried mercilessly along, many weighted by burdens strapped to their backs, the men, who had no wives or children with them and were therefore capable of attempting escape, were tied together by a rope pursed through a sort of wooden collar. Those men who had their families with them were allowed the free use of their limbs. Great numbers died from sickness, starvation and exhaustion on the road. The sick when they became too weak to struggle on were left behind. If a house happened to be near, the sick man or woman was left with the people in the house. If no house was at hand which must have been oftener the case in the wild country they were traversing, the sufferer was flung down to die miserably in the jungle. Any of his or her companions attempting to stop to assist the poor creatures were driven on with blows. […] Fever and dysentery were still at work among them and many more will probably die. Already I was told, more than half of the original 5.700 so treacherously seized are dead.

— E.B. Gould, Letter to Knox, 4. August 1876

Due to slave raids and forced population transfers, there are small, scattered villages of Phuan in Sakon and Udon Thani provinces and another area around Bueang Kan, Nong Khai and Loei provinces in Thailand. Despite the small numbers and isolation, the Siamese kept the Phuan apart from the Lao and other Tai people in Northern and Central Thailand where small communities of Phuan also exist, forcing them to live apart and dress in black clothing. The Phuan in turn practised endogamous marriage habits and steadfastness to their language and culture. As a result of the Laotian Civil War, in which the province of Xieng Khouang was devastated by fighting and American area bombing, many Phuan moved to Vientiane.

== Culture ==
The Phuan are known for handwoven textiles, especially the striped and patterned pakama, a short sarong worn by men, and a pasin tin jok, a longer women's skirt. Some villages in the Tha Wang Pha District retain a tradition of knife making. Due to their proximity and very similar culture and language, Phuan culture is very similar to other tribal Tai groups and the Isan and Lao people with whom they are neighbours. One interesting custom is the use of elephants to parade initiates into the monastery, usually just before Songkran.

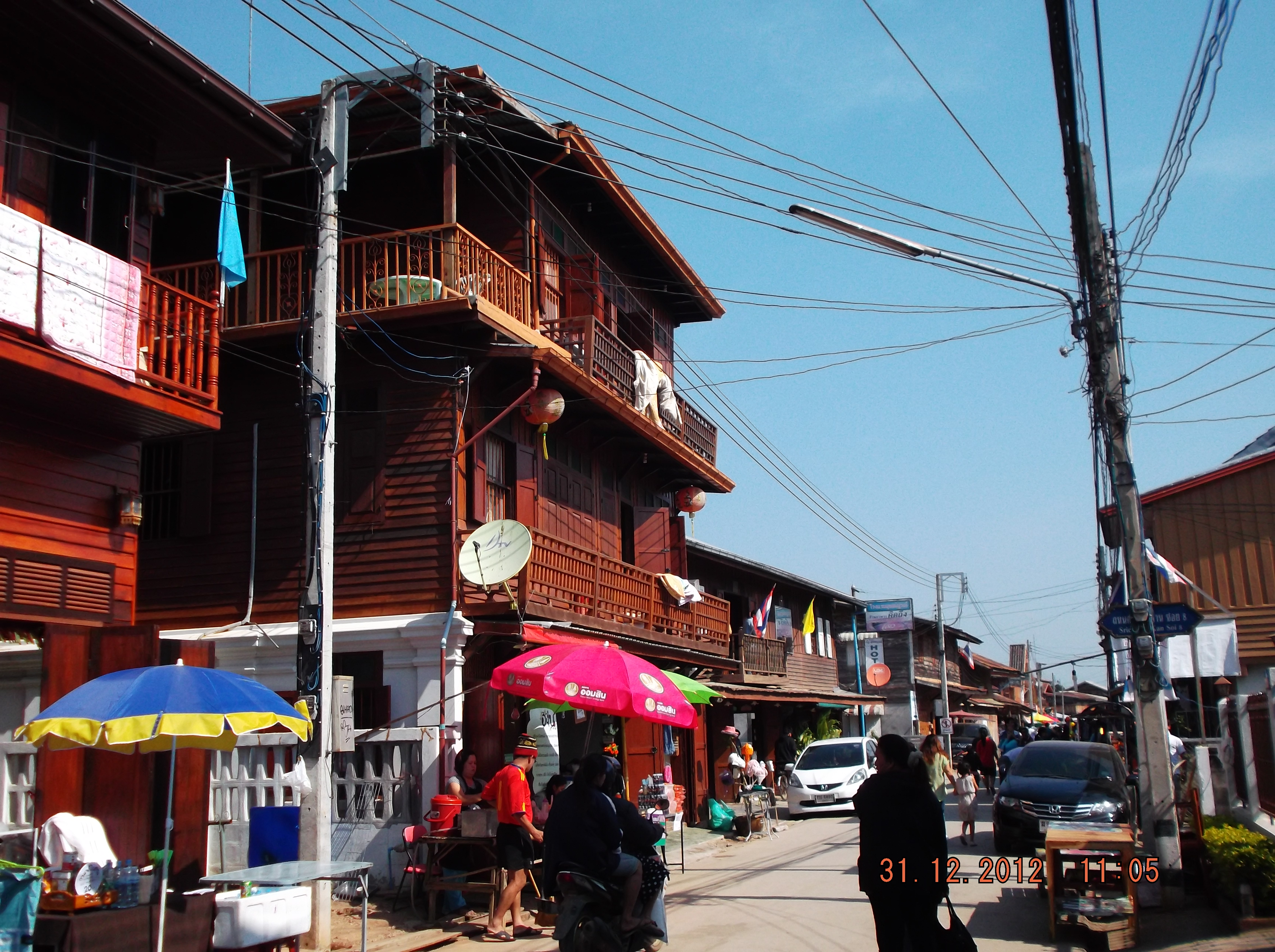
Chiang Khan in Loei Province, Thailand. The town and surrounding district has a large Phuan minority.

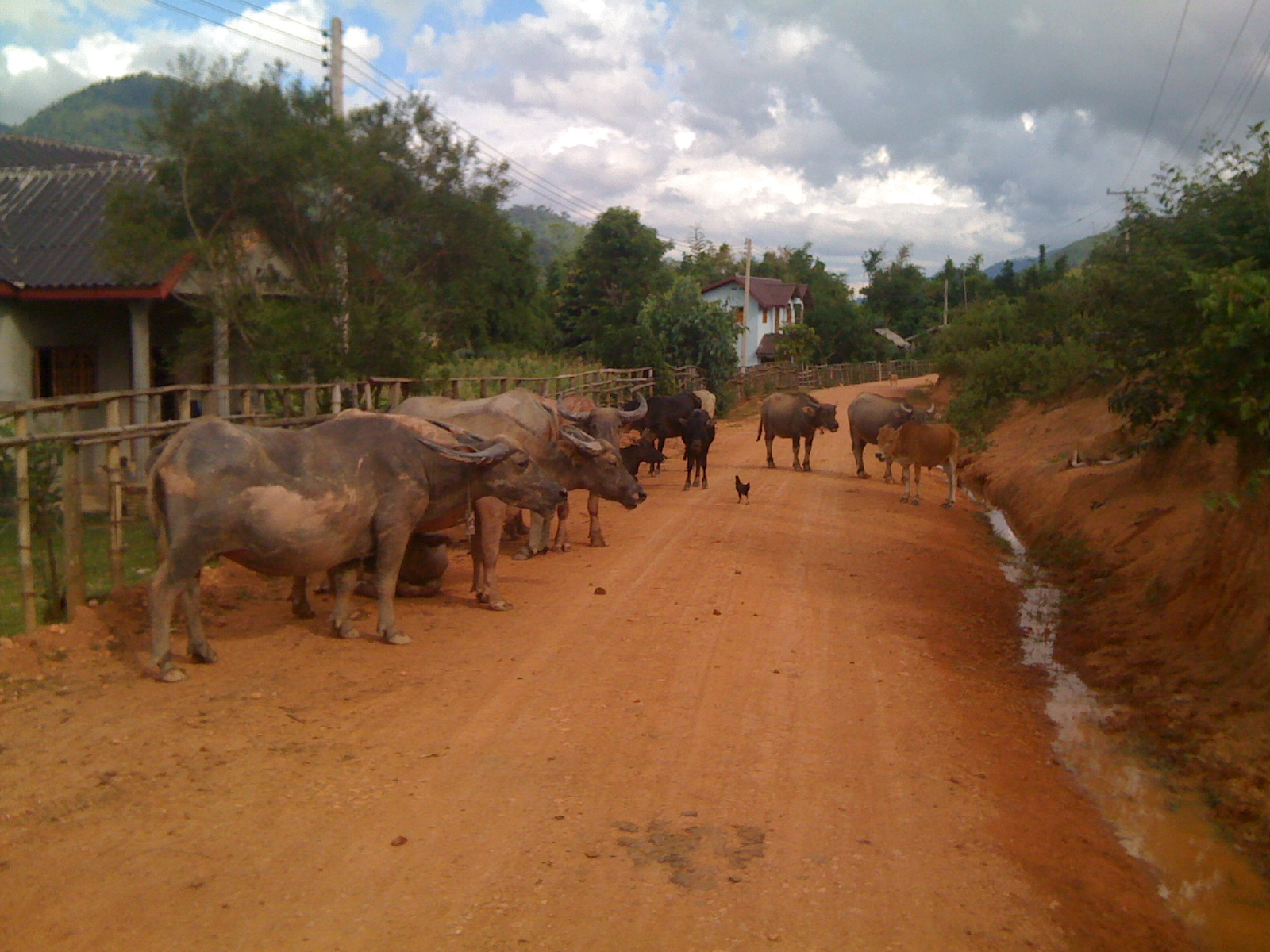
A rural road in Xiangkhouang Province. This was the original Phuan homeland and Phuan is the primary Tai language of the province.

== Language ==
The language is closely related to other tribal Tai languages, such as the Thai Dam and the Thai Loei. Unlike other tribal Tai languages in the Isan region, the Phuan language is not losing ground to the standard Thai language or the local Isan/Lao trade language.

== Bibliography ==
- Miller, Terry E. and Taywin Promnikon. "Fading Musical Memory: 150 Years of Lao Phuan Singing in Lopburi, Thailand." Journal of the Siam Society, Vol. 112, Part 1 (June 2024), pp. 71–84.
