= Phuan language =

Tai language of Southeast Asia

Phuan
- ພວນ, พวน
- Native to: Laos, Thailand
- Ethnicity: Phuan people
- Native speakers: 300,000 (2003–2009)
- Language family: Kra–Dai: Tai; Southwestern (Thai); Chiang Saen; Phuan
- Writing system: Thai, Lao, Tham

Language codes
- ISO 639-3: phu
- Glottolog: phua1239
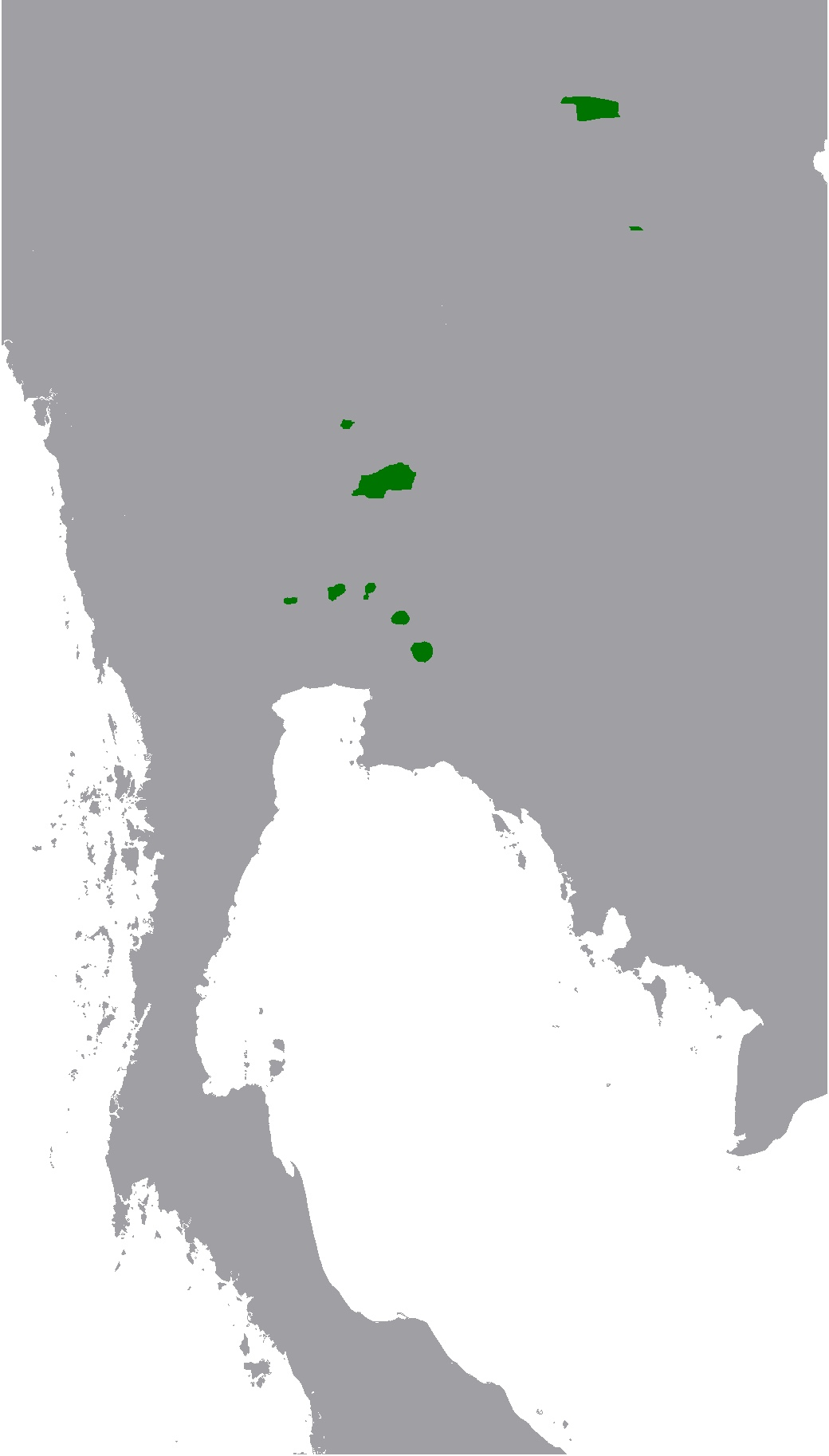

Phuan or Northeastern Lao is a Tai language spoken in Laos, Thailand and Cambodia.

== Distribution ==
The Phuan (ພວນ, พวน Phuan, /pʰúan/) are a Tai people originally inhabiting Xiangkhouang and parts of Houaphan provinces of Laos. As a result of slave raids and forced population transfers, there are small, scattered villages of Phuan in Sakon and Udon Thani provinces and another area around Bueng Kan, Nong Khai and Loei provinces in Thailand. Despite the small numbers and isolation, the Siamese kept the Phuan apart from the Lao, and in from other Thai people in Northern and Central Thailand were small communities of Phuan also exist, forcing them to live apart and dress in black clothing. The Phuan in turn practised endogamous marriage habits and steadfastness to their language and culture. It is distinct enough that Thais and Isan people generally consider it distinct, although Phuan is considered a Lao dialect in Laos. As a Tai language of northern Southeast Asia, it shares many similarities with Tai Dam and Tai Lan Na. In contrast to other minority languages of Isan, it is not losing ground to the Thai or Isan.

In Thailand, Phuan is spoken in Chachoengsao, Chaiyaphum, Lopburi, Nakhon Nayok, Phetchabun, Phichit, Prachinburi, Suphan Buri, and Saraburi provinces; it is also spoken in an isolated area of Bueng Kan Province, and in one village south of Bangkok

There are approximately 5,000 Phuan in Mongkol Borei District of Banteay Meanchey Province in Cambodia, as well in Battambang Province.

== Phonology ==
Similar to Northern Lao, Phuan has maintained the Proto-Southwestern Tai distinction of Proto-Tai */aɰ/ and */aj/, but the outcome is /ɤː/ and /aj/, respectively, similar to the Northern Lao dialects of Houaphan which has a significant Phuan presence. Similar to the Phuthai (ผู้ไท, ຜູ້ໄທ Phou Tai, /pʰȕː tʰáj/), final /k/ has been replaced by the glottal stop /ʔ/. What mainly distinguishes Phuan from all other Lao dialects are the vowel transformations that distinguish cognates, such as Thai and Lao /ua/ appearing as Phuan /oː/ and Thai and Lao /ɯa/ appearing as Phuan /ia/. This and a very distinct vocabulary make Phuan mutually intelligible but with difficulty to other Isan or Lao speakers and even harder to understand for native speakers of Central Thai.

=== Consonants ===
Phuan has the following consonant inventory:

Consonant phonemes
		Labial	Dental/ Alveolar	(Alveolo-) Palatal	Velar	Glottal
Plosive	voiceless	p	t	tɕ	k	ʔ
Plosive	aspirated	pʰ	tʰ		kʰ	
Plosive	voiced	b	d			
Fricative		f	s			h
Nasal		m	n	ɲ	ŋ	
Approximant			l	j	w	
Trill			r			

Phuan features two consonant clusters, /kʰw/ and /kw/.

=== Vowels ===
Phuan has the following vowel inventory:

	Front		Central		Back	
	unr.		unr.		rnd.	
	short	long	short	long	short	long
Close	i	iː	ɯ	ɯː	u	uː
Mid	e	eː	ɤ	ɤː	o	oː
Open	ɛ	ɛː	a	aː	ɔ	ɔː

Two diphthongs are found: /ia/ and /ua/.

==== Comparison with Lao, Isan and Thai ====
Northeastern Lao (Phuan) vowel differences
Thai	Isan	Vientiane Lao	Phuan Northeastern Lao	Gloss
Lack of /aj/-/aɯ/ merger
ให้ hai [hâj]	ให้ hai [hàj]	ໃຫ້ hai [ha᷆j]	ໃຫ້ (เห้อ) *hoe [hɤ᷆ː]	'to give'
ใจ chai [tɕāj]	ใจ chai [tɕàj]	ໃຈ chai [tɕàj]	ໃຈ (เจ่อ) *choe [tɕɤ̀ː]	'heart'
ไม้ mai [máːj]	ไม้ mai [ma᷆(ː)j]	ໄມ້ mai [mâj]	ໄມ້ (ไม้) mai [mȁj]	'wood', 'tree'
ไฟ fai [fāj]	ไฟ fai [fâj]	ໄຟ fai [fáj]	ໄຟ (ไฟ) fai [fàj]	'fire'
Thai and Lao (Isan) /ua/ > Phuan /o/
ช้อน chon [tɕʰɔ́ːn]	บ่วง buang [búaŋ]	ບ່ວງ buang [būaŋ]	ໂບ່ງ (โบ่ง) bong [bòːŋ]	'spoon'
สะพาน saphan [sā.pʰāːn]	สะพาน saphan [sā.pʰâːn]	ຂົວ khua [kʰŭa]	ໂຂ (โข) kho [kʰòː]	'bridge'
กล้วย kluai [klûaj]	กล้วย kluai [kȗaj]	ກ້ວຍ/ກ້ວຽ kuai [kȗaj]	ໂກ້ຍ/ໂກ້ຽ (โก้ย) koi [kôːj]	'banana'
Thai and Lao (Isan) /ɯa/ > Phuan /ia/ or /ɤː/
เดือน duean [dɯ̄an]	เดือน duean [dɯ̀an]	ເດືອນ duean [dɯ̀an]	ດຽນ (เดียน) *dian [dìan]	'month'
เหลือง lueang [lɯ̌aŋ]	เหลือง lueang [lɯ̌aŋ]	ເຫລືອງ/ເຫຼືອງ lueang [lɯ̆aŋ]	ຫລຽງ/ຫຼຽງ (เหลียง) *liang [lìaŋ]	'yellow'
เปลือย plueai [plɯ̄aj]	เปลือย plueai [pɯ̀aj]	ເປືອຍ/ເປືອຽ pueai [pɯ̀aj]	ເປີຍ/ເປີຽ (เปย) poei [pɤ̀ːj]	'undressed', 'nude'
Thai and Lao final /k/ > Phuan /ʔ/
ผล, มะ- phon, ma- [pʰǒn], [máʔ]	บัก bak [bǎk]	ຫມາກ/ໝາກ mak [mȁːk]	ຫມາ (หม่า) ma [màː]	'fruit'
ลูก luk [lûːk]	ลูก luk [lu᷆ːk]	ລູກ luk [lȗːk]	ລູ (ลู) lu [lùː]	'child'
กระดูก kraduk [krā.dùːk]	กระดูก kraduk [kā.dùːk]	ກະດູກ kaduk [kā.du᷆ːk]	ດູ (ดู) du [dùː]	'bone'

== Vocabulary ==
Northeastern Lao (Phuan) words
Thai	Isan	Vientiane Lao	Phuan Northeastern Lao	Gloss
โซ่ so [sôː]	โส้ so [sòː]	ໂສ້ so [so᷆ː]	ເສັຍ/ເສັຽ (เสียะ) sia [sìaʔ]	'chain'
อีแร้ง i raeng [ʔīː rɛ́ːŋ]	อีแฮ้ง i haeng [ʔìː hɛ᷆ːŋ]	ອີ່ແຮ້ງ i haeng [ʔīː hɛ̑ːŋ]	ບ້າແຮ້ງ (บ้าแฮ้ง) ba haeng [bâː hɛ᷇ːŋ]	'vulture'
พุทรา phut sa [pʰút sāː]	บักทัน bak than [bǎk tʰân]	ຫມາກກະທັນ/ໝາກກທັນ mak kathan [mȁːk kā.tʰán]	ຫມາທັນ/ໝາທັນ (หมาทัน) ma than [màː tʰàn]	'jujube'
คิดถึง khit thueng [kʰít tʰɯ̌ŋ]	คึดฮอด khuet hot [kʰɯ̀t hɔ᷆ːt]	ຄຶດຮອດ khuet hot [kʰɯ̀t hɔ̂ːt]	ຄຶດຮູ້ (คึดฮู้) khuet hu [kʰɯ̀t hûː]	'to miss someone/something'
ไหน nai [nǎj]	ใส sai [sǎj]	ໃສ sai [sǎj]	ກະເລີ (กะเลอ) kaloe [kā.lɤ̀ː]	'where'

== Tones ==
Outside of Xiangkhouang and other native areas in Laos, the scattered Phuan settlements in Thailand have been greatly influenced by the tones of the local languages, however even though most maintain six, those in Louang Phrabang or Central Thailand only have five and when spoken as a second language by tribal peoples of various languages, they may use seven. However all Phuan dialects share distinct tonal split, with syllables beginning with low-clas consonants and marked with the mai ek (may ék) tone mark pronounced differently than similar situations with other class consonants. This is also done in some varieties of Western Lao. Most other Lao dialects have the same tone when marked with the mai ek tone mark.

Tai Phuan of Ban Fai Mun, Nan Province, Thailand
Tone Class	Inherent Tone	Mai ek (◌່)	Mai tho (◌້)	Long Vowel	Short Vowel
High	Low-Rising	Low	Middle (glottalised)	Low	Mid-Rising
Middle	Mid-Rising	Low	High-Falling	Low	Mid-Rising
Low	Mid-Rising	Mid-Falling	High-Falling	Mid-Falling	Low

Tai Phouan of Xiangkhouang Province, Laos
Tone Class	Inherent Tone	Mai ek (◌່)	Mai tho (◌້)	Long Vowel	Short Vowel
High	Rising	Low	Falling	Low	Middle
Middle	Rising	Low	Falling	Low	Middle
Low	Middle	Low-Falling Rising	High-Falling	Low-Falling Rising	Low

Tai Phouan of Pak Xèng, Louang Phrabang Province, Laos
Tone Class	Inherent Tone	Mai ek (◌່)	Mai tho (◌້)	Long Vowel	Short Vowel
High	High-Falling (glottalised)	Falling	High-Rising	Falling	High-Rising
Middle	Middle	Falling	High-Rising	Falling	High-Rising
Low	Middle	High-Rising	Low-Falling	High-Rising	High-Rising
