= Tày Tac language =

Southwestern Tai language of Vietnam

Tày Tac
- Native to: Vietnam
- Language family: Kra–Dai: Tai; Southwestern (Thai); Chiang Saen; Tày Tac
- Writing system: Latin script, Tai Viet script

Language codes
- ISO 639-3: tyt
- Glottolog: tayt1241
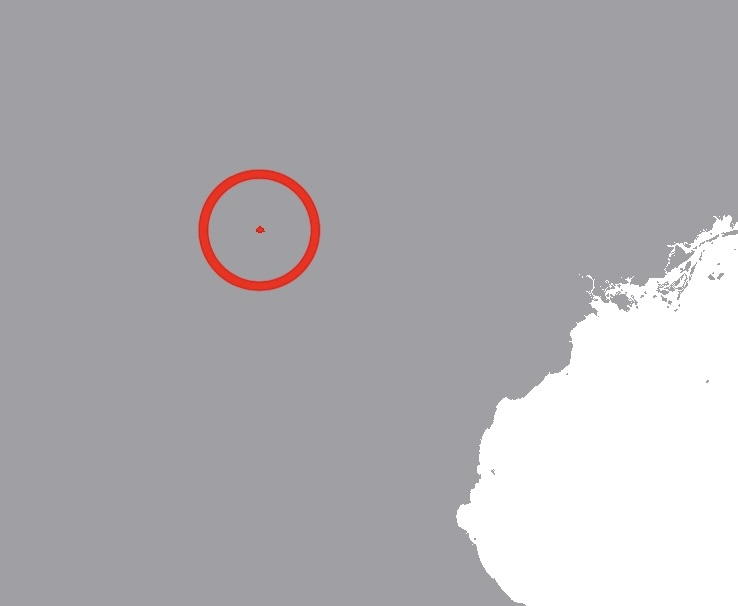

Tày Tấc (Tai Tâk) is a Southwestern Tai language spoken in Mường Tấc District (Muang Tâk), eastern Sơn La Province, Vietnam, where it is also referred to as White Tay.

== Works cited ==
- Donaldson, Jean; Edmondson, Jerold A. (1997). "A Preliminary Examination of Tay Tac". In Edmondson, Jerold A.; Solnit, David B. (eds.). Comparative Kadai: The Tai Branch. Dallas: Summer Institute of Linguistics and the University of Texas at Arlington. pp. 235–266.
