= Kuan language (Laos) =

Tai language of Laos

Kuan
- Native to: Laos
- Native speakers: 886 (2015 census)
- Language family: Kra–Dai: Tai; Southwestern?; Kuan

Language codes
- ISO 639-3: uan
- Glottolog: kuan1246

Kuan (Guan) is a Tai language of Laos. It is not easily classified within Tai, possibly due to migration.
