= Dehong Dai =

Dehong Dai may refer to:

- Dehong Dai and Jingpo Autonomous Prefecture.
- Tai Nüa language, also Dehong Dai and Chinese Shan, a language of those Dai people living in the Dehong Dai and Jingpo Autonomous Prefecture, and the Shan in Myanmar.
- Tai Nua people
- Tai Le script, used for the Tai Nüa language.
