= Southwestern Tai languages =

Branch of the Tai languages of Southeast Asia

Southwestern Tai
- Southwestern Thai
- Geographic distribution: Southeast Asia, Northeast India
- Linguistic classification: Kra–Dai: Kam–Tai ?; Be–Tai ?; Tai; Southwestern Tai
- Proto-language: Proto-Southwestern Tai (Proto-Thai)
- Subdivisions: Southern Thai; Central–Eastern Thai

Language codes
- Glottolog: sout3184
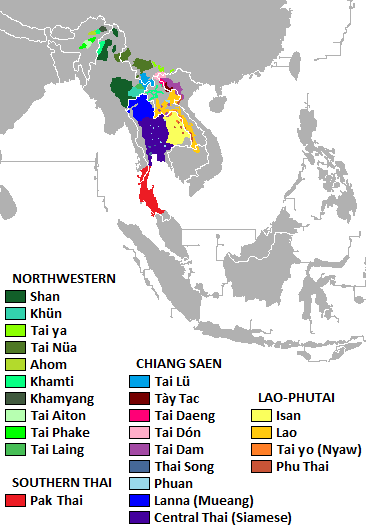
- Distribution of the Southwestern Tai languages.

The Southwestern Tai or Thai languages are a branch of the Tai languages of Southeast Asia. Its languages include Central Thai (Siamese), Northern Thai (Lanna), Lao (including Isan), Shan and others.

== Classification ==
The internal classification of the Southwestern Tai dialects is still not well agreed on.

=== Chamberlain (1975) ===
Chamberlain (1975) divides Southwestern Tai into 4 branches.

Chamberlain based his classification on the following phonological patterns. (Note: For an explanation of the notation system for Tai tones, see Proto-Tai language#Tones.)

1. /p/ vs. /ph/
2. tone *A column split/merger pattern
3. tone *BCD columns split/merger patterns
4. B-DL tonal coalescence

Proto-Southwestern Tai

- Branch with distinguishing innovation: /p/
  - Branch with distinguishing innovation: *A 1-23-4
    - Tse Fang, a variety of Tai Nuea spoken at Zhefang (遮放镇) in Mangshi, Yunnan, China
    - Tai Mao, a variety of Tai Nuea spoken at Nam Hkam, Shan State, Myanmar
    - Muang Ka, a variety of Tai Nuea spoken at Muang Ka in Muang Baw, Yunnan, China
  - Branch with distinguishing innovation: *ABCD 123-4; B=DL
    - Black Tai spoken at Sơn La, Vietnam
    - Red Tai
    - White Tai
    - Lue, a composite of varieties from many locations in several countries
    - Shan spoken at Kengtung ca. 1930s
    - Yuan, a composite of varieties spoken in the capital towns of Chiang Rai, Phrae, Nan, Lampang, and Chiang Mai, Thailand
    - Ahom
- Branch with distinguishing innovation: /ph/ (*A 1-23-4)
  - Branch with distinguishing innovation: *BCD 123-4
    - Siamese
    - Phu Tai
    - Lao Neua spoken at "Nam Tha" (perhaps referring to Luang Namtha, Laos)
    - Phuan spoken at Ban Mi, Lopburi, Thailand and Pak Seng
  - Branch with distinguishing innovation: *BCD 1-23-4; B≠DL
    - Lao
    - Southern Thai

The Tai Muong Vat of Yen Chau, Vietnam is a PH-type language like Lao, even though it is geographically surrounded by Black Tai (Theraphan 2003; Chamberlain 1984).

=== Edmondson & Solnit (1997) ===
Edmondson & Solnit (1997) divide the Southwestern Tai dialects into two major subgroups. According to this classification, Dehong Tai and Khamti are the first languages to have split off from the Southwestern Tai branch.

1. Northern: Tai Nua = Shan-Tayok (Chinese Shan), Khamti
2. Southern: Burman Shan ("Shan proper"), all other Southwestern Tai

A transition zone between the Northern and Southern groups occurs among the Tai languages (including Tai Mau) around the Burma-China border region of Mangshi, Namhkam, and Mu-se near Ruili.

This bipartite division of Southwestern Tai is argued for by Edward Robinson in his paper "Features of Proto-Nüa-Khamti" (1994). The following features set off the Nüa-Khamti group from all the other Southwestern Tai dialects.

1. Labialized velar stops have become velar stops.
2. Tripartite split of the A tone A1-23-4
3. Merger of A23 and B4
4. The low vowels /ɛ/ and /ɔ/ have merged with /e/ and /o/, respectively.
5. *ʔb > m

=== Luo (2001) ===
Luo Yongxian (2001) also recognizes the uniqueness of Dehong Tai (Tai Nuea), but argues for that it should be placed in a separate Northwestern Tai branch with Southwestern Tai as a sister branch. Luo claims that the Northwestern Tai branch has many Northern Tai and Central Tai features that are not found in Southwestern Tai. His proposed tree for the Tai branch is as follows.

- Tai
  - Northern
  - Central
  - Southwestern
  - Northwestern

=== Pittayaporn (2009) ===
According to Pittayaporn (2009:301), Southwestern Tai (his subgroup Q) is defined by a phonological shift of *kr- → *ʰr-.

Pittayaporn (2014) also suggests that Southwestern Tai began to disperse southward after the 7th century C.E. but before the 11th century C.E. (between 700 and 1000 C.E., during the late Tang dynasty or early Song dynasty), as evidenced by loanwords from Late Middle Chinese.

Pittayaporn (2018) recognizes two branches within Southwestern Tai, namely Eastern and Western. The Eastern branch consists of the closely related languages Black Tai, White Tai, and Red Tai, while the Western branch is much more internally diverse. The Western branch also contains a Southern group consisting of Thai and Lao.

Southwestern Tai

- Eastern branch: Black Tai, White Tai, Red Tai
- Western branch: Shan varieties, Lue, Yuan, Lao, Thai (defining innovation: *kʰr- > kʰ-)
  - Southern sub-branch: Thai, Lao, etc. (defining innovations: *ɓl- > ɗ- and *ʰr > h-)

Pittayaporn, et al. (2018) note that following sound changes from Proto-Southwestern Tai (PSWT) to the Tai varieties represented in the Sukhothai and Ayutthaya inscriptions, and conclude that the Sukhothai and Ayutthaya inscriptions in fact represent the same language.

1. the merger of dorsal obstruents
2. the merger of PSWT *aɯ and *aj
3. the merger of PSWT *ɲ-, *j- and *ʔj-
4. the loss of voicing distinction in sonorants
5. *ɓl- > d-
6. *kʰr- > kʰ-
7. *ʰr- > h-

== Languages ==
Southern Thai (Pak Thai) is often posited to be the most divergent; it seems to retain regular reflexes of early tonal developments that were obscured in the other (Central–Eastern) languages. The reconstructed language is called Proto-Thai; cf. Proto-Tai, which is the ancestor of all of the Tai languages.

The following tree follows that of Ethnologue

- Southern Thai (Pak Thai) (Thailand)
- Chiang Saen dialects (11)
  - Tai Dam (Black Tai; Vietnam, Thailand, Laos)
  - Tai Yuan (Lanna; Thailand, Laos, Burma)
  - Lue (Lue, Tai Lue; China, Vietnam, Thailand, Laos, Burma)
  - Phuan (Laos, Thailand)
  - Thai Song (Thailand)
  - Thai (Central/Standard Thai, Siamese; Thailand)
  - Tai Dón (White Tai, Tai Kao; Vietnam, China)
  - Tai Daeng (Vietnam)
  - Tai Meuay (Laos)
  - Tay Tac (Vietnam)
  - Thu Lao (Vietnam)
- Lao–Phutai dialects (5)
  - Lao (Laos; except Luang Prabang dialect is classified as Chiang Saen languages.)
  - Lao Nyo (Cambodia, Thailand)
  - Phu Thai (Thailand)
  - Isan (Northeastern Thai; Thailand, Laos)
  - Kaloeng (Thailand, Laos)
- Northwestern Tai dialects (Shanic family) (10)
  - Aiton (Assam, Arunachal Pradesh)
  - Ahom (Assam – extinct. Modern Assamese is Indo-European.)
  - Khamti (Arunachal Pradesh, Assam, Burma)
  - Tai Laing (Tai Lai; Burma)
  - Khün (Kuen; Burma)
  - Khamyang (Assam, Arunachal Pradesh)
  - Tai Nuea (China, Vietnam, Thailand, Laos)
  - Phake (Assam, Arunachal Pradesh)
  - Shan (Tai Shan, Dehong; Burma)
  - Turung (Assam – Modern Turung is a Sino-Tibetan language with Tai influence. )

According to Ethnologue, other Southwestern dialects are Tai Ya (China), Pu Ko (Laos), Pa Di (China), Tai Thanh (Vietnam), Tai Long (Laos), Tai Hongjin (China), Yong (Thailand). It is not clear where they belong in the classification above. Ethnologue also lists under Tai, without further classification, Kuan (Laos), Tai Do (Viet Nam), Tai Pao (Laos), and Tay Khang (Laos). Geographically these would all appear to be Southwestern.

Ethnologue also includes Tày Sa Pa (Sapa) of Vietnam, which Pittayaporn excludes from Southwestern Tai but classifies as the most closely related language outside of that group. Pittayaporn also includes Yoy, which Ethnologue classifies as a Northern Tai language.
