= Pa Di language =

Southwestern Tai language of China and Vietnam

Pa Di
- Native to: China, Vietnam
- Native speakers: (undated figure of 1,300)
- Language family: Kra–Dai: Tai; Southwestern (Thai); ?; Pa Di

Language codes
- ISO 639-3: pdi
- Glottolog: padi1241
- ELP: Pa Di
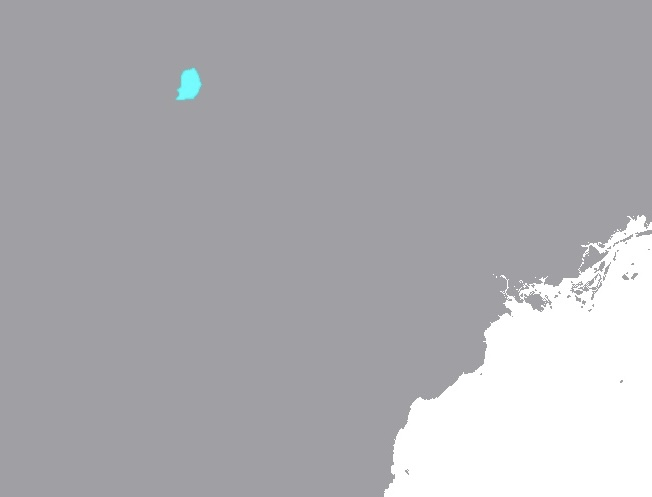

Pa Di [pa31 zi31] is a Southwestern Tai language of the Chinese–Vietnamese border. There are about 300 Pa Di speakers in Muong Khuong District, Lao Cai Province, Vietnam, who are classified as ethnic Tày by the Vietnamese government. Pa Di tonal splits are similar to those of Standard Thai.

Jerold Edmondson reports about 300 speakers. However, Bùi Quốc Khánh (2013) reports 3,000 Pa Dí people living in 19 natural villages in Mường Khương, Tung Trung Phố, and Nậm Chảy communes of Mường Khương District.

In China, Pa Di is spoken in Hekou Yao Autonomous County and Jinping Miao, Yao and Dai Autonomous County, Honghe Prefecture, Yunnan.

== Sources ==
- Bùi Quốc Khánh. 2013. Tri thức dân gian trong canh tác cây lúa nước của người Pa Dí ở Lào Cai. Nhà xuất bản Thời Đại. ISBN 978-604-930-596-2
- Ngô Đức Thịnh (1975). "Mấy ý kiến góp phần xác minh người Pa Dí ở Mường Khương (Lào Cai)". In, Ủy ban khoa học xã hội Việt Nam: Viện dân tộc học. Về vấn đề xác định thánh phần các dân tộc thiểu số ở miền bắc Việt Nam, 287–305. Hà Nội: Nhà xuất bản khoa học xã hội.
