= Tai Meuay language =

Tai language spoken in Laos

Tai Meuay
- Tày Mười
- Tai Meuy
- Region: Bolikhamxay Province, Laos
- Ethnicity: Tai
- Language family: Kra–Dai: Tai; Southwestern (Thai); P group; Tai Meuay

Language codes
- ISO 639-3: –
- Glottolog: taym1239

Tai Meuay (/taj mɯaj/), Tai Meuy (/taj mɤːj/), or Tày Mười is a Southwestern Tai language spoken in Bolikhamxay Province, Laos. Phonological and anthropological evidence show that it is most closely related to the Tai Daeng (Red Tai) language. Tai Meuay also displays lexical similarities with Tay language varieties of Nghệ An Province, Vietnam.

Tai Meuay has been documented by Souksada Soutthixay.

== Demographics ==
Tai Meuay is spoken in Khamkeut District, Pakkading District, and Viengthong District of Bolikhamxay Province, Laos, and also in other nearby areas within central Laos.

There are two ethnic groups of Tai Meuay people:

- Tai Meuay Katip Nyeu ("large basket Tai Meuay")
- Tai Meuay Katip Noi ("small basket Tai Meuay")
