= Tai Daeng people =

Ethnic group

Red Tai
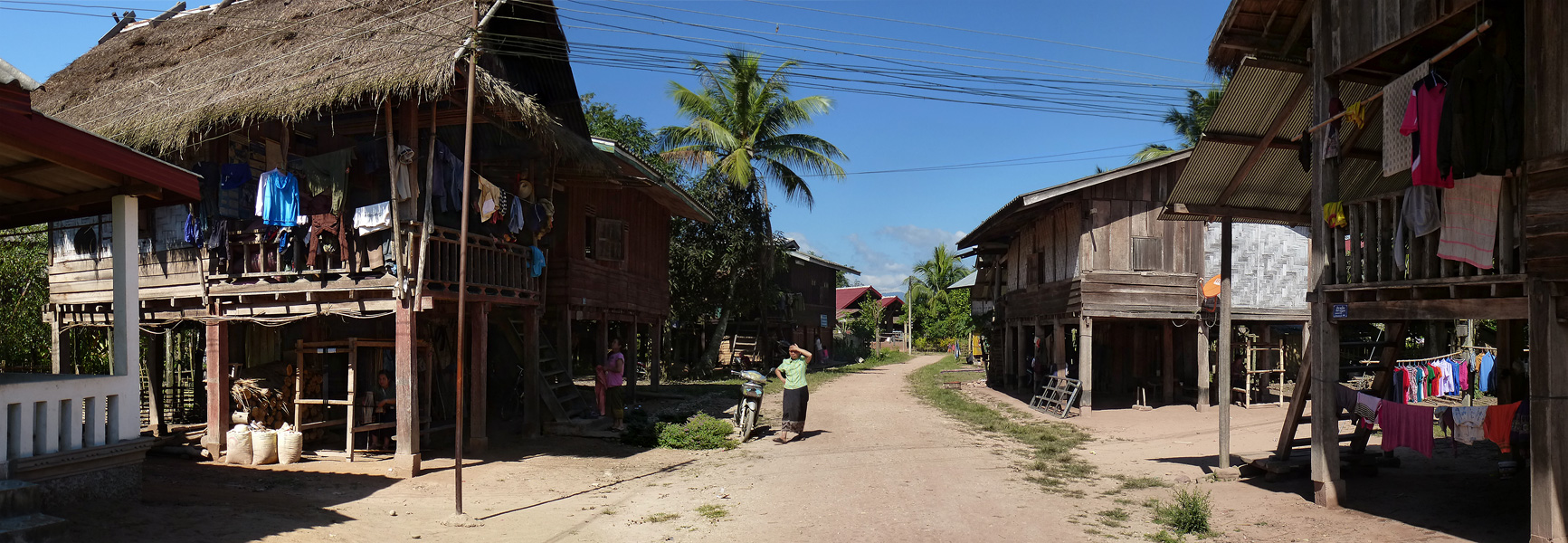
- Ban Phieng Ngam, a Thai Daeng (Red Thai) village, Luang Namtha Province, Laos.

Total population
- 165,000 (est.)

Regions with significant populations
- Thailand, Vietnam, Laos

Languages
- Tai Daeng, Vietnamese, Thai, others

Religion
- Tai folk religion, Theravada Buddhism, Christianity

The Tai Daeng or Red Tai (in Vietnamese language Thái Đỏ) are an ethnic group of Vietnam and Laos. They speak the Tai Daeng language. In Vietnam, they are called Thái Đỏ and are included in the group of the Thái people, together with the Thái Đen ("Black Tai"), Thái Trắng ("White Tai"), Phu Thai, Tày Thanh and Thái Hàng Tổng. The group of the Thái people is the third largest of the fifty-four ethnic groups recognized by the Vietnamese government.

== Geographic distribution ==
- 140,000 in Vietnam (2002)
- 25,000 in Laos (1991)
- Unknown population in Thailand
- Unknown population in the United States

== Population clusters ==
- Thanh Hóa Province of Vietnam
- Houaphanh province of Laos

== Family ==
- Patriarchal

== Religions ==
- Tai folk religion
- Theravada Buddhism (95.5%)
- Animism
- Christian (4.5%)

== Bibliography ==
- Placzek, Kanittanan, James, Wilaiwan (1986). "Historical and contemporary meaning of Thai khwan: The use of lexical meaning change as an indicator of cultural change". Religion, Values, and Development in Southeast Asia. Institute of Southeast Asian Studies. pp. 146–166.
