= Thai people =

Tai ethnic group

ไทยสยาม/คนภาคกลาง
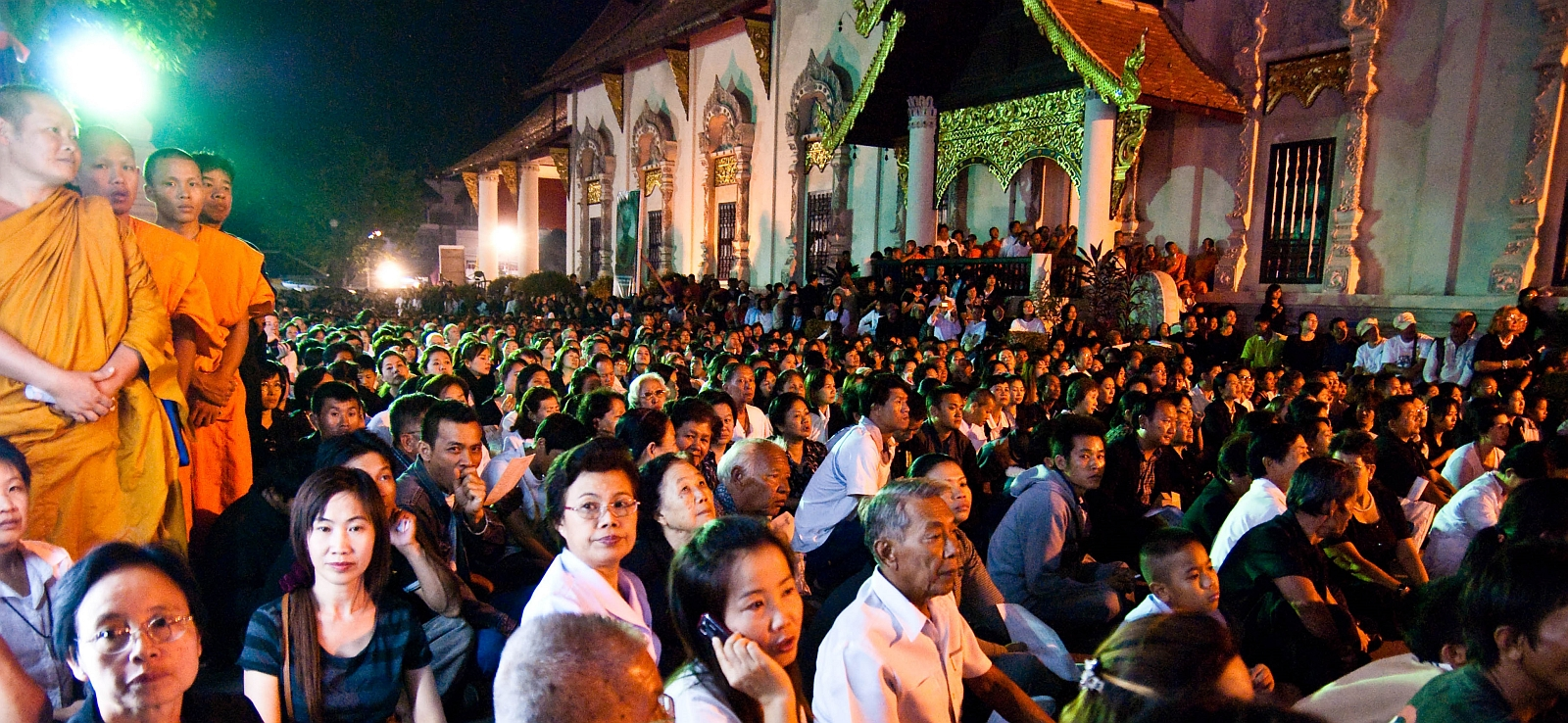
- Thais at a cremation ceremony in Wat Chedi Luang

Total population
- c. 65 million (Note: The total figure is merely an estimation; sum of all the referenced populations below.)

Regions with significant populations
- Thailand c. 51–57.8 million (Note: Thai people make up approximately 75–85% population of the country (58 million) if including the Southern Thai and, more controversially, the Northern Thai and Isan people, all of which include significant populations of non Tai-Kadai ethnic groups)

Diaspora
- United States: 343,265 (2023)
- South Korea: 193,462 (2024)
- Australia: 115,000(2021)
- Germany: 115,000 (2020)
- Malaysia: 105,312 (2022)
- Japan: 65,398 (2024)
- Taiwan: 65,297 (2024)
- United Kingdom: 55,000 (2024)
- Sweden: 45,940 (2023)
- Norway: 34,540 (2024)
- France: 30,000 (2023)
- Israel: 24,369 (2024)
- Indonesia: 24,000 (2020)
- Singapore: 23,705 (2022)
- Netherlands: 23,648 (2024)
- Canada: 22,275 (2021)
- Belgium: 17,822 (2023)
- Hong Kong: 17,753 (2024)
- United Arab Emirates: 16,337 (2024)
- Laos: 15,497 (2015)
- Denmark: 10,951 (2024)
- Finland: 10,594 (2024)
- New Zealand: 10,251 (born), c. 50,000 (ancestry) (2018)
- Switzerland: 9,961 (2023)
- Italy: 7,385 (2024)
- Cambodia: 7,224 (2023)
- Saudi Arabia: 7,190 (2024)
- China: 6,195 (2024)
- Austria: 4,844 (2014)
- Qatar: 4,408 (2024)
- India: 3,133 (2014)
- Egypt: 3,000 (2024)
- Bahrain: 2,564 (2024)
- Ireland: 2,405 (2024)
- Brazil: 2,280 (2025)
- Hungary: 2,200 (2024)
- South Africa: 2,130 (2024)
- Spain: 2,044 (2024)
- Turkey: 1,816 (2024)
- Czechia: 1,727 (2024)
- Russia: c. 1,500–2,000 (2023)
- Pakistan: 1,408 (2024)
- Portugal: 1,404 (2024)
- Myanmar: 1,375 (2024)
- Philippines: 1,340 (2023)
- Vietnam: c. 1,300 (2023)
- Kuwait: 1,210 (2024)
- Brunei: 1,021 (2024)

Languages
- Central Thai, Southern Thai

Religion
- Predominantly : Theravada Buddhism and Siamese folk religion 97.6% Minorities: Tai folk religion n/a Sunni Islam 1.6% Christianity 0.8%

Related ethnic groups
- Other Tai peoples; (Lao people, Shan people, Dai people, Ahom people) Northern Thai people; Malaysian Siamese,Siamese Cambodians

Chart shows the demographics of Thailand

Thai people, historically known as Siamese people, are an ethnic group native to Thailand. In a narrower and ethnic sense, the Thais are also a Tai ethnic group dominant in Central Thailand (Siam proper). Part of the larger Tai ethno-linguistic group native to Southeast Asia as well as Southern China, Thais speak the Sukhothai languages (Central Thai and Southern Thai language), which is classified as part of the Kra–Dai family of languages. The majority of Thais are followers of Theravada Buddhism.

Government policies during the late 1930s and early 1940s resulted in the successful forced assimilation of various ethno-linguistic groups into the country's dominant Central Thai language and culture, leading to the term Thai people to come to refer to the population of Thailand overall. This includes other subgroups of the Tai ethno-linguistic group, such as the Northern Thais and the Isan people, as well as non-Southeast Asian and non-Tai groups, the largest of which is that of the Han Chinese, who form a substantial minority ethnic group in Thailand at about 12 to 15%.

== Etymology ==
=== Names ===
By endonym, Thai people refer themselves as chao thai (Thai: ชาวไทย, IPA: [tɕʰaːw tʰaj]), whose term eventually being derived from Proto-Tai *ɗwɤːjᴬ meaning free, which emphasise that Thailand has never been a colony in the late modern period. Academically, Thai people are referred to as the Chao Phraya Thais (ไทยลุ่มเจ้าพระยา, Thai lum chao phraya).

Ethnically, Thai people are called Siamese (ชาวสยาม, chao sayam, IPA: [tɕʰaːw sàjǎːm]) or Thai Siam (ไทยสยาม, thai sayam), which refers to the Tai people inhabited in Central and Southern Thailand; (Note: Exonym is generally used to differentiate between Thai Chinese when they refer to themselves as Thais by nationality or citizenship.) Siamese people are subdivided into three groups: Khon Phak Klang (Thai: คนภาคกลาง, lit: Central Thai people) or Khon Tai (Thai: คนใต้, lit: Southern Thai people) and Khorat Thai (ไทโคราช). Siamese was also, by historically, the exonym of those people. In Du royaume de Siam, Simon de la Loubère recorded that the people whom he spoke were Tai Noi (ไทน้อย), which were different from Shan people (or Tai Yai), who lived on the mountainous area of what is now Shan State in Myanmar. On 24 June 1939, however, Plaek Phibunsongkhram formally renamed the country and its people Thailand and Thai people respectively.

Due to the partial success of Thaification, the term Thai people, often creates ambiguity among the various Tai groups in the country, especially the Sino-Thai who also call themselves the same.

=== Origin ===
According to Michel Ferlus, the ethnonyms Thai/Tai (or Thay/Tay) would have evolved from the etymon *k(ə)ri: 'human being' through the following chain: *kəri: > *kəli: > *kədi:/*kədaj > *di:/*daj > *daj^{A} (Proto-Southwestern Tai) > tʰaj^{A2} (in Siamese and Lao) or > taj^{A2} (in the other Southwestern and Central Tai languages classified by Li Fangkuei). Michel Ferlus' work is based on some simple rules of phonetic change observable in the Sinosphere and studied for the most part by William H. Baxter (1992).

Michel Ferlus notes that a deeply rooted belief in Thailand has it that the term "Thai" derives from the last syllables -daya in Sukhodaya/ Sukhothay (สุโขทัย), the name of the Sukhothai Kingdom. The spelling emphasizes this prestigious etymology by writing ไทย (transliterated ai-d-y) to designate the Thai/ Siamese people, while the form ไท (transliterated ai-d) is occasionally used to refer to Tai speaking ethnic groups. Lao writes ໄທ (transliterated ai-d) in both cases. The word "Tai" (ไท) without the final letter ย is also used by Thai people to refer to themselves as an ethnicity, as historical texts such as "Mahachat Kham Luang", composed in 1482 during the reign of King Borommatrailokkanat. The text separates the words "Tai" (ไท) from "Tet" (เทศ), which means foreigners. Similarly, "Yuan Phai", a historical epic poem written in the late 15th to early 16th century, also used the word "Tai" (ไท).

The French diplomat Simon de la Loubère, mentioned that, "The Siamese give to themselves the Name of Tai, or Free, and those that understand the Language of Pegu, affirm that Siam in that Tongue signifies Free. 'Tis from thence perhaps that the Portugues have derived this word, having probably known the Siamese by the Peguan. Nevertheless Navarete in his Historical Treatises of the Kingdom of China, relates that the Name of Siam, which he writes Sian, comes from these two words Sien lo, (Note: Xiānluó or Hsien-lo (暹羅) was the Chinese name for Ayutthaya, a kingdom created by the merger of Lavo and Sukhothai or Suphannabhumi) without adding their signification, or of what Language they are; altho' it may be presumed he gives them for Chinese, Mueang Tai is therefore the Siamese Name of the Kingdom of Siam (for Mueang signifies Kingdom) and this word wrote simply Muantay, is found in Vincent le Blanc, and in several Geographical Maps, as the Name of a Kingdom adjoining to Pegu: But Vincent le Blanc apprehended not that this was the Kingdom of Siam, not imagining perhaps that Siam and Tai were two different Names of the same People. In a word, the Siamese, of whom I treat, do call themselves Tai Noe, *little Siams. There are others, as I was informed, altogether savage, which are called Tai yai, great Siams, and which do live in the Northern Mountains."

Based on a Chinese source, the Ming Shilu, Zhao Bo-luo-ju, described as "the heir to the old Ming-tai prince of the country of Xian-luo-hu", (Chinese: 暹羅斛國舊明台王世子) sent an envoy to China in 1375. Geoff Wade suggested that Ming Tai (Chinese: 明台) might represent the word "Muang Tai" while the word Jiu (Chinese: 舊) means old.

== History ==
=== Emergence of Siamese ===
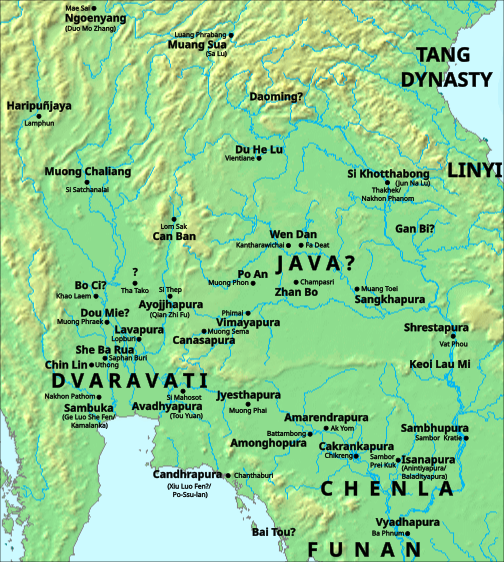
Proposed locations of ancient kingdoms in Menam and Mekong Valleys in the 7th century based on the details provided in the Chinese leishu, Cefu Yuangui, and others.

The present-day Thai people were previously called Siamese before the country was renamed Thailand in the mid-20th century. The Thais, or Siamese, is the majority group living in Thailand, Laos and ethnic minorities in Vietnam, Myanmar, India and southern China. The South East Asian race into five distinct groups as follows: Mon-Khmer group, Viet-Muong group, Tay-Thai group and Hmong-Dzao group and the Southern islands group (Cham, Gia Rai, Ede). So the Tay and Thai people has a common origin. They settled in the fertile plains of central Thailand, where they established powerful kingdoms like Sukhothai and Ayutthaya. Over time, they absorbed cultural influences from pre-existing groups, including the Mon.

The toponym or ethnonym siam or syam appears in several pre-Angkorian inscriptions, and earlier scholars have interpreted it as denoting either a geographical locality or an ethnolinguistic group within the Chao Phraya Basin; those inscriptions include K557 (611 CE), K127 (683 CE), K154 (685 CE), K79 (639 CE), and K904 (713 CE). Furthermore, the Chinese sources record a 6th-century polity known as Qiān Zhī Fú (千支弗), which some scholars have speculated was centered at Si Thep. The prefix qiān (千) phonetically resembles xiān (暹), a term employed by both Chinese and Đại Việt to designate the peoples and polities of the Chao Phraya River basin during the early second millennium. On this basis, Tatsuo Hoshino proposed that Qiān Zhī Fú represented one of the early Siamese city-states—later subject to Tainization—that flourished through their participation in the trans-Mekong trade networks linking Champa in the east with the Menam Basin in the west.

The present-day descendants of the Qiān population, also known as the Nyah Kur people, who are not Tainized and maintain the Nyah Kur language—an archaic survival of Old Mon—reside primarily in the highland region surrounding the ancient center of Si Thep, with notable concentrations along the borderlands of Chaiyaphum, Phetchabun, Lopburi, and Nakhon Ratchasima provinces.

=== Arriving of Tais ===
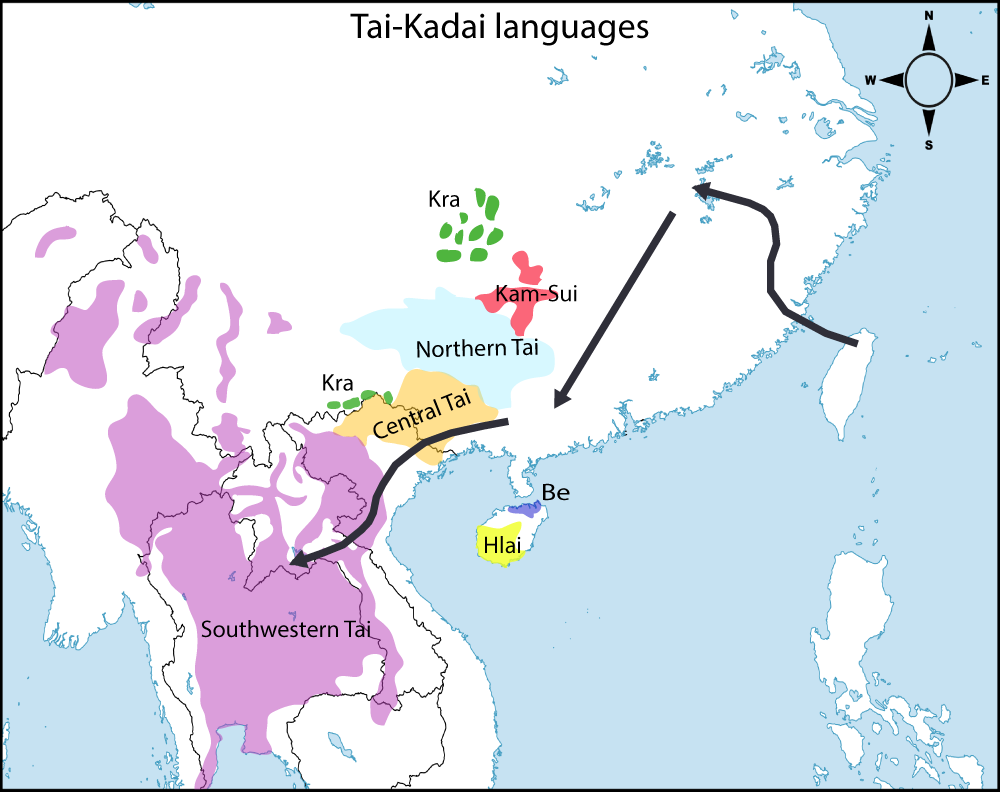
Kra-Dai migration route proposed by Matthias Gerner (2014) in a linguistic computational project

Map showing linguistic family tree overlaid on a geographic distribution map of Tai-Kadai family. This map only shows general pattern of the migration of Tai-speaking tribes, not specific routes, which would have snaked along the rivers and over the lower passes.

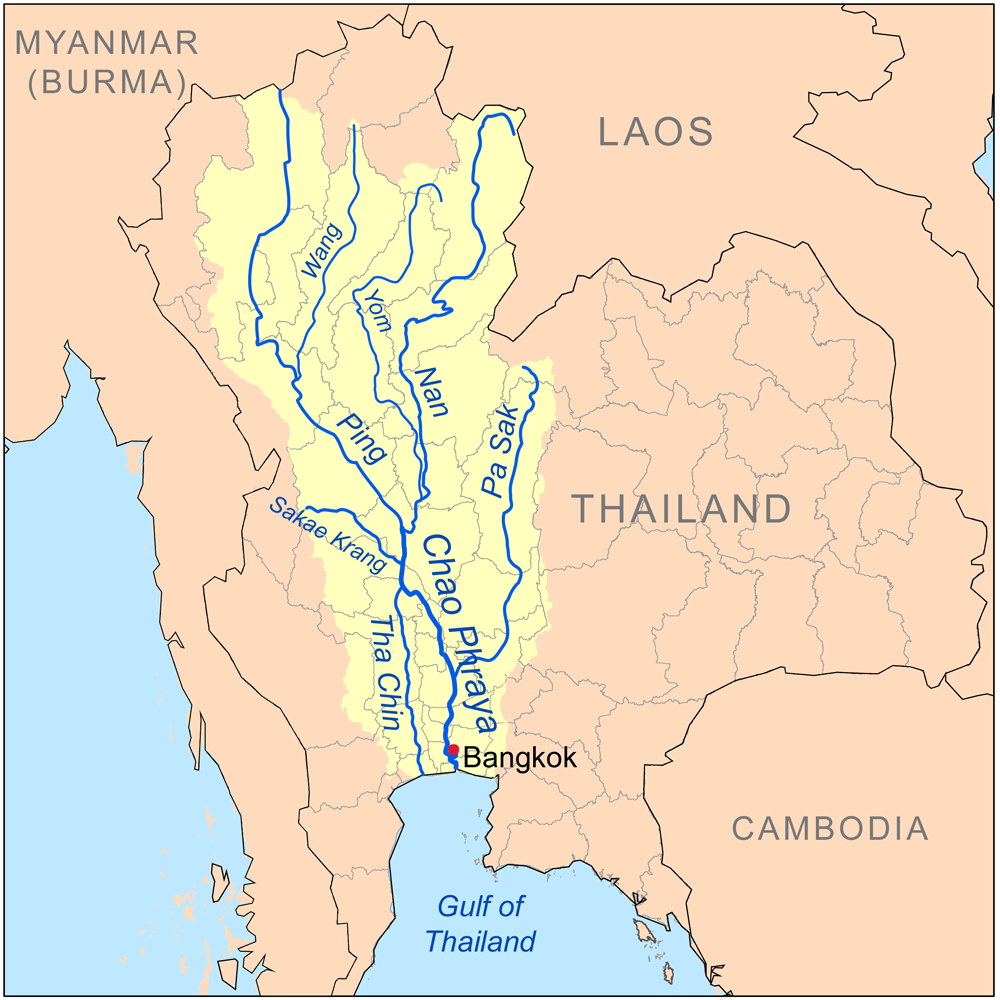
Map of the Chao Phraya River drainage basin

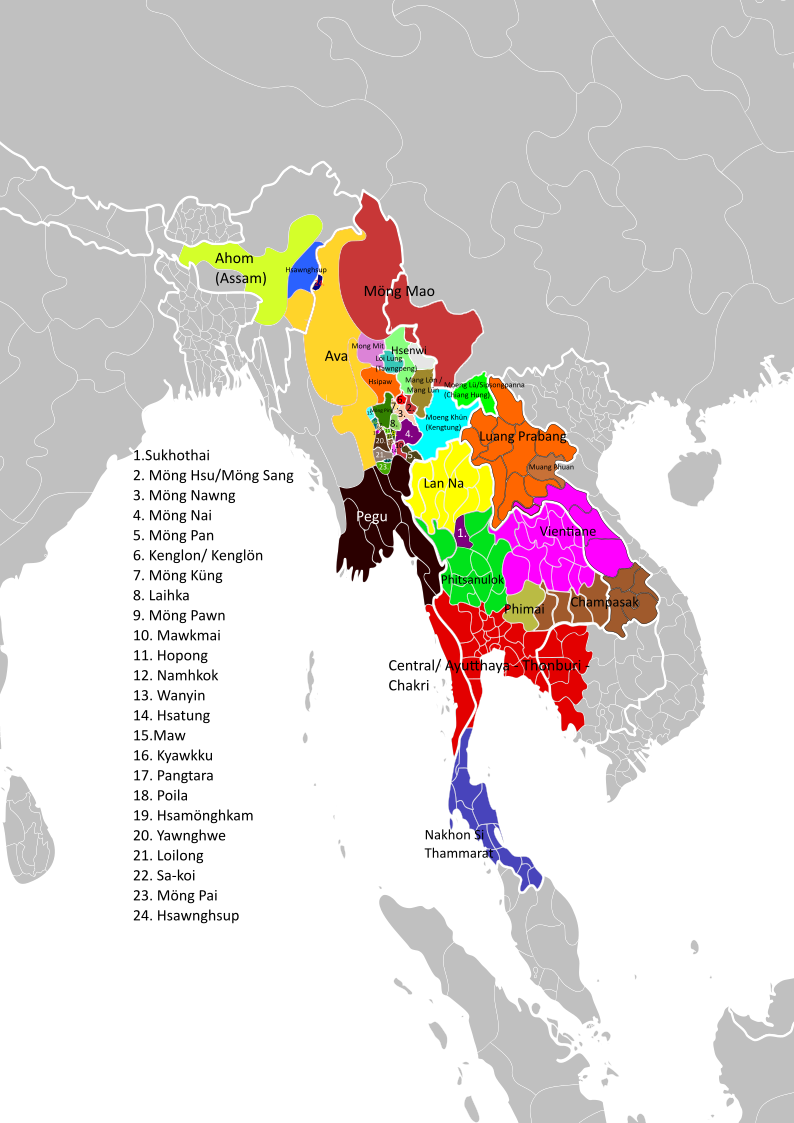
Map of historical countries governed by Tai people

There have been many theories proposing the origin of the Tai peoples — of which the Thai are a subgroup — including an association of the Tai people with the Ai Lao and Kingdom of Nanzhao. A linguistic study has suggested that the origin of the Tai people may lie around Guangxi Zhuang Autonomous Region of southern China, where the Zhuang people currently account for approximately one third of the total population. The Qin dynasty founded Guangdong in 214 BC, initiating varying successive waves of Han Chinese from the north for centuries to come.

With dynastic Chinese political upheavals, cultural changes, and intensive Han migratory pressures from north that led the Tai peoples on the verge of being displaced, some of them migrated southwards where they met the classical Indianized civilizations of Southeast Asia. According to linguistic and other historical evidence, the southwestward migration of Southwestern Tai-speaking tribes, in particular, from Guangxi took place sometime between the 8th-10th centuries.

The Tais from the north gradually settled in the Chao Phraya valley from the tenth century onwards, in lands of the Dvaravati culture, assimilating the earlier Austroasiatic Mon and Khmer people, as well as coming into contact with the Khmer Empire. The Tais who came to the area of present-day Thailand were engulfed into the Theravada Buddhism of the Mon and the Hindu-Khmer culture and statecraft. Therefore, the Thai culture is a mixture of Tai traditions with Indic, Mon, and Khmer influences.

Another proposed migration route, based on linguistic analysis, involves Daic-speaking populations moving from the east and settling in Luo Yue as early as around 700 BCE. Within this framework, the Âu group is hypothesized to have followed a trans-Mekong trade corridor linking Champa and Đại Việt in the east with the Menam Basin in the west. The route is reconstructed as extending from northern Vietnam through Thanh Hóa and Nghệ An, continuing into present-day Laos in regions such as Khamkeut and Hinboun, and ultimately reaching northeastern Thailand, including areas around Nakhon Phanom and Sakon Nakhon. Meanwhile, the Lạc group is scholarly interpreted as having persisted as a lineage designation among the Tai Dam people in Sip Song Chau Tai, and is also associated in later genealogical narratives with Khun Lo of the Lao people. Evidence from Chinese sources indicates that Tai- or Daic-speaking populations were present within several 6th-century polities in the Mun-Chi and middle Mekong Valleys, including Wen Dan, Gǔ Láng Dòng (古郎洞), Zhān Bó, Jūn Nà Lú (君那盧), Cān Bàn, Gān Bì, and Qiān Zhī Fú. Together with the Tai Chiang Saen branch migrating from the north, they arrived in the central plain during the 8th–9th centuries, a period coinciding with the decline of the Dvaravati polities.

=== Thai kingdoms ===
The most recognized early Thai chiefdoms included the Yonok Kingdom , Sukhothai Kingdom and Suphannaphum. The Lavo Kingdom, which was the center of Khmer culture in the Chao Phraya valley from the 10th to 11th century, was also the rallying point for the Thais. The Thai were called "Siam" by the Angkorians and they appeared on the bas relief at Angkor Wat as a part of the army of the Lavo Kingdom. Sometimes the Thai chiefdoms in the Chao Phraya valley were put under the Angkorian control under strong monarchs As a state sharing common racial or cultural ties, at times. (including Suryavarman II and Jayavarman VII), but they were mostly independent.

A new city-state known as Ayutthaya covering the areas of central and southern Thailand, named after the Indian city of Ayodhya, was founded by Ramathibodi and emerged as the center of the growing Thai empire starting in 1350. Inspired by the then Hindu-based Khmer Empire, the Ayutthayan empire's continued conquests led to more Thai settlements as the Khmer empire weakened after their defeat at Angkor in 1431. During this period, the Ayutthayans developed a feudal system as various vassal states paid homage to the Ayutthayans kings. Even as Thai power expanded at the expense of the Mon and Khmer, the Thai Ayutthayans faced setbacks at the hands of the Malays at Malacca and were checked by the Toungoo of Burma.

Though sporadic wars continued with the Burmese and other neighbors, Chinese wars with Burma and European intervention elsewhere in Southeast Asia allowed the Thais to develop an independent course by trading with the Europeans as well as playing the major powers against each other in order to remain independent. The Chakkri dynasty under Rama I held the Burmese at bay, while Rama II and Rama III helped to shape much of Thai society, but also led to Thai setbacks as the Europeans moved into areas surrounding modern Thailand and curtailed any claims the Thai had over Cambodia, in dispute with Burma and Vietnam. The Thai learned from European traders and diplomats, while maintaining an independent course. Chinese, Malay, and British influences helped to further shape the Thai people who often assimilated foreign ideas, but managed to preserve much of their culture and resisted the European colonization that engulfed their neighbors. Thailand is also the only country in Southeast Asia that was not colonized by European powers in modern history. The 1893 "Map to Illustrate the Siamese Question", lithographed by the Scottish William Johnston (1802–1888) and his brother Alexander Keith Johnston (1804–1871), describes the demographics: "the population is very mixed consisting of Siamese, Chinese, Laosians, Malays and a few Europeans."

=== Thaification: 20th century ===
The concept of a Thai nation was not developed until the beginning of the 20th century, under Prince Damrong and then King Rama VI (Vajiravudh). Before this era, Thai did not even have a word for 'nation'. King Rama VI also imposed the idea of "Thai-ness" (khwam-pen-thai) on his subjects and strictly defined what was "Thai" and "un-Thai". Authors of this period re-wrote Thai history from an ethno-nationalist viewpoint, disregarding the fact that the concept of ethnicity had not played an important role in Southeast Asia until the 19th century. This newly developed nationalism was the base of the policy of "Thaification" of Thailand which was intensified after the end of absolute monarchy in 1932 and especially under the rule of Field Marshal Plaek Phibunsongkhram (1938–1944). Minorities were forced to assimilate and the regional differences of northern, northeastern and southern Thailand were repressed in favour of one homogenous "Thai" culture. As a result, many citizens of Thailand cannot differentiate between their nationality (san-chat) and ethnic origin (chuea-chat). It is thus common for descendants of Jek เจ๊ก (Chinese) and Khaek แขก (Indian, Arab, Muslim), after several generations in Thailand, to consider themselves as "chuea-chat Thai" (ethnic Thai) rather than identifying with their ancestors' ethnic identity.

Other peoples living under Thai rule, mainly Mon, Khmer, and Lao, as well as Chinese, Indian or Muslim immigrants continued to be assimilated by Thais, but at the same time they influenced Thai culture, philosophy, economy and politics. In his paper Jek pon Lao (1987) (เจ้กปนลาว—Chinese mixed with Lao), Sujit Wongthet, who describes himself in the paper as a Chinese mixed with Lao (Jek pon Lao), claims that the present-day Thai are really Chinese mixed with Lao. He insinuates that the Thai are no longer a well-defined race but an ethnicity composed of many races and cultures. The biggest and most influential group economically and politically in modern Thailand are the Thai Chinese. Theraphan Luangthongkum, a Thai linguist of Chinese ancestry, claims that 40% of the contemporary Thai population have some distant Chinese ancestry largely contributed from the descendants of the former successive waves of Han Chinese immigrants that have poured into Thailand over the last several centuries.

== Genetics ==
According to a 2021 study, Northern Tai-Kadai groups are genetically close to Dai and Kinh Vietnamese people and exhibit less admixture with indigenous Austroasiatic groups. Meanwhile, Northeastern Tai-Kadai groups are genetically close to Austroasiatic Khmu-Katu groups, who recently migrated to Thailand from Laos. They are also closely related to Cambodians. Central and Southern Tai-Kadai groups have ancestry related to other Tai groups while also having admixture from pre-existing Mon groups. Compared to their Neolithic ancestors, they show excess affinities with Han Chinese. Southern Thai Austronesian groups are also not related to Austronesians from Taiwan but instead, are more related to the Mamanwa, Mons, Central and Southern Tai-Kadai groups. Austroasiatic groups from Thailand can be categorized into the Monic, Khmu-Katu or Palaungic groups. Monic and Palaungic groups are admixed with Sino-Tibetan groups. Conversely, Khmu-Katu are more admixed with Tai-Kadai groups from Northeastern Thailand and Laos, increasing the affinities between the groups. Meanwhile, Thai hill tribes such as Hmong, Mlabri and Iu Mien are genetically more isolated although Iu Mien show some affinities with Hmong, Tai-Kadai and Sino-Tibetan groups from Thailand and China. Other hill tribes like Lawa and Lisu are less isolated from foreign contact. It has been suggested by experimental ancient admixutre tools like globetrotter, that some populations in present day Thailand have minor Gujarati and Tiwari ancestry.

Another 2021 study showed that Thai hill tribes have distinct genetic affinities. For example, the Mlabri clustered with other Austroasiatic groups in Thailand, and other Southeast Asians (e.g. Vietnamese, Laotians, Indonesians etc.). Burmese populations, however, do not cluster with the Mlabri. Instead, they cluster with other East Asians (e.g. Chinese, Japanese, Koreans etc.), Sino-Tibetan-speaking groups (e.g. Akha, Lisu) and Austroasiatic-speaking groups (e.g. Palaung and Lawa Western 1). Meanwhile, all Thai Hmong and IuMien populations cluster with southern Chinese and Tai-Kadai groups that migrated to Thailand from southern China.

A 2023 study stated that most Kra-Dai speaking populations in Thailand emerged from admixture between Kra-Dai migrants from southern China and local Austroasiatic-speaking populations, with Laos being a gateway for Kra-Dai migration. However, the presence of Dai and Zhuang ancestry in some Northern and Central Thai populations suggest an alternative route. There is also evidence of bidirectional admixture between Southern Thai and Nayu, who show close genetic relationships with Austronesian speaking groups from Island Southeast Asia. For Central Thais, there is no evidence of close affinities with Mon, except for two Central Thai individuals from the Potharam district of Ratchaburi province.

Several studies show high genetic affinities between Thai populations and several Southwestern Chinese groups. Thai populations also have broad affinities with Iron Age Log Coffin-associated individuals from Northwestern Thailand, who are a mixture of Upper Yellow River-related, Southern East Asian-related and Hoabinhian-related ancestries. However, they differ due to receiving additional components from neighboring Laotians, Burmese and Southern Chinese, which occurred after 1700 BP.

According to a 2025 study, Dai-related ancestry is the predominant ancestral component for Northern Tai-Kadai groups (19.1–100%) whilst Lao-related ancestry is more common for other Tai-Kadai groups, ranging from 19% for Central Tai-Kadai groups to 100% for some Northeastern Tai-Kadai groups. Central and Southern Tai-Kadai groups also received additional input from Sino-Tibetan, Hmong-Mien and possibly Bengali and Gujarati people. Genetic links between Indian lineages and a clade of Tai-Kadai populations from Northern Thailand is also observed. Whilst Tai-Kadai migrations into Thailand from South China begun since ancient times, it intensified in the past few centuries, exemplified by King Kawila's attempts to repopulate the war-torn cities of the Lan Na Kingdom. Most of these recent Tai-Kadai migrants were sourced from Southwestern China and Myanmar.

== Geography and demographics ==
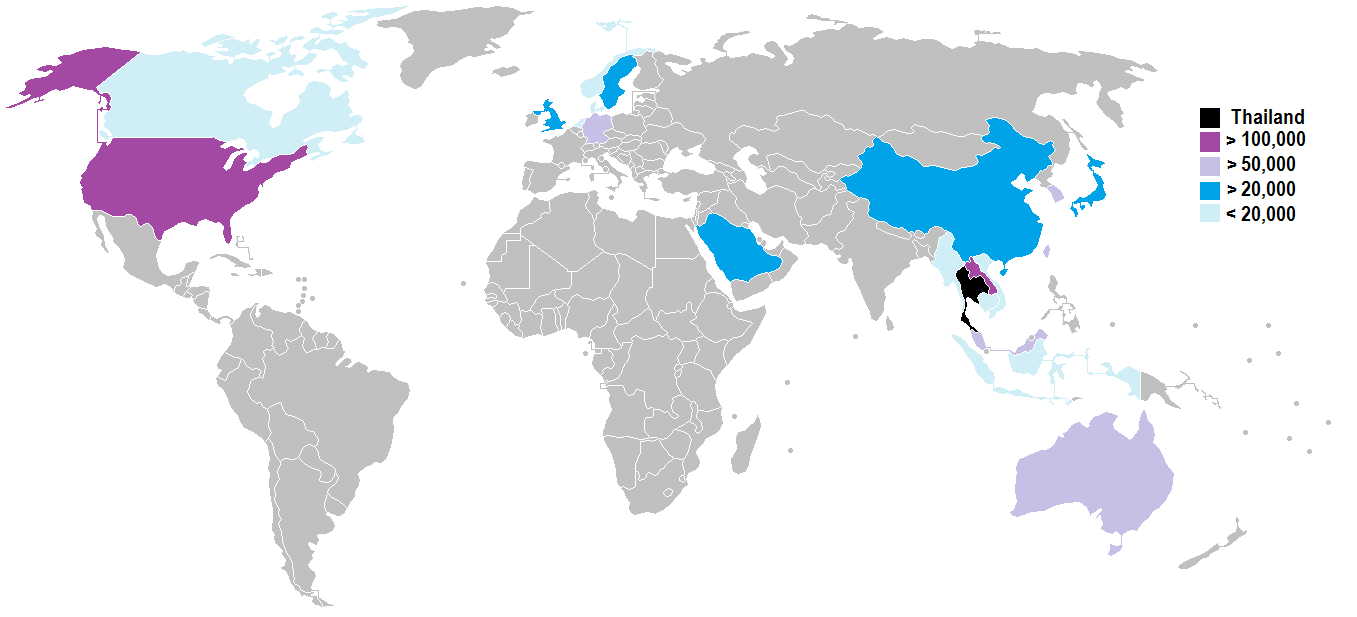
Thai people abroad

The vast majority of the Thai people live in Thailand, although some Thais can also be found in other parts of Southeast Asia. About 51–57 million live in Thailand alone, while large communities can also be found in the United States, China, Laos, Japan, Taiwan, Malaysia, Singapore, Cambodia, Vietnam, Burma, South Korea, Germany, the United Kingdom, Canada, Australia, Sweden, Norway, Libya, and the United Arab Emirates.

== Culture and society ==
The Thais can be broken down into various regional groups with their own regional varieties of Thai. These groups include the Central Thai (also the standard variety of the language and Culture), the Southern Thai, the Isan (more closely related to the standard Lao of Laos than to standard Thai) and Lanna Thai. Within each regions exist multiple ethnic groups. Modern Central Thai culture has become more dominant due to official government policy, which was designed to assimilate and unify the disparate Thai in spite of ethnolinguistic and cultural ties between the non-Central-Thai-speaking people and their communities.

Indigenous arts include muay Thai (kick boxing), Thai dance, makruk (Thai Chess), Likay, and nang yai (shadow play).

== Religion ==
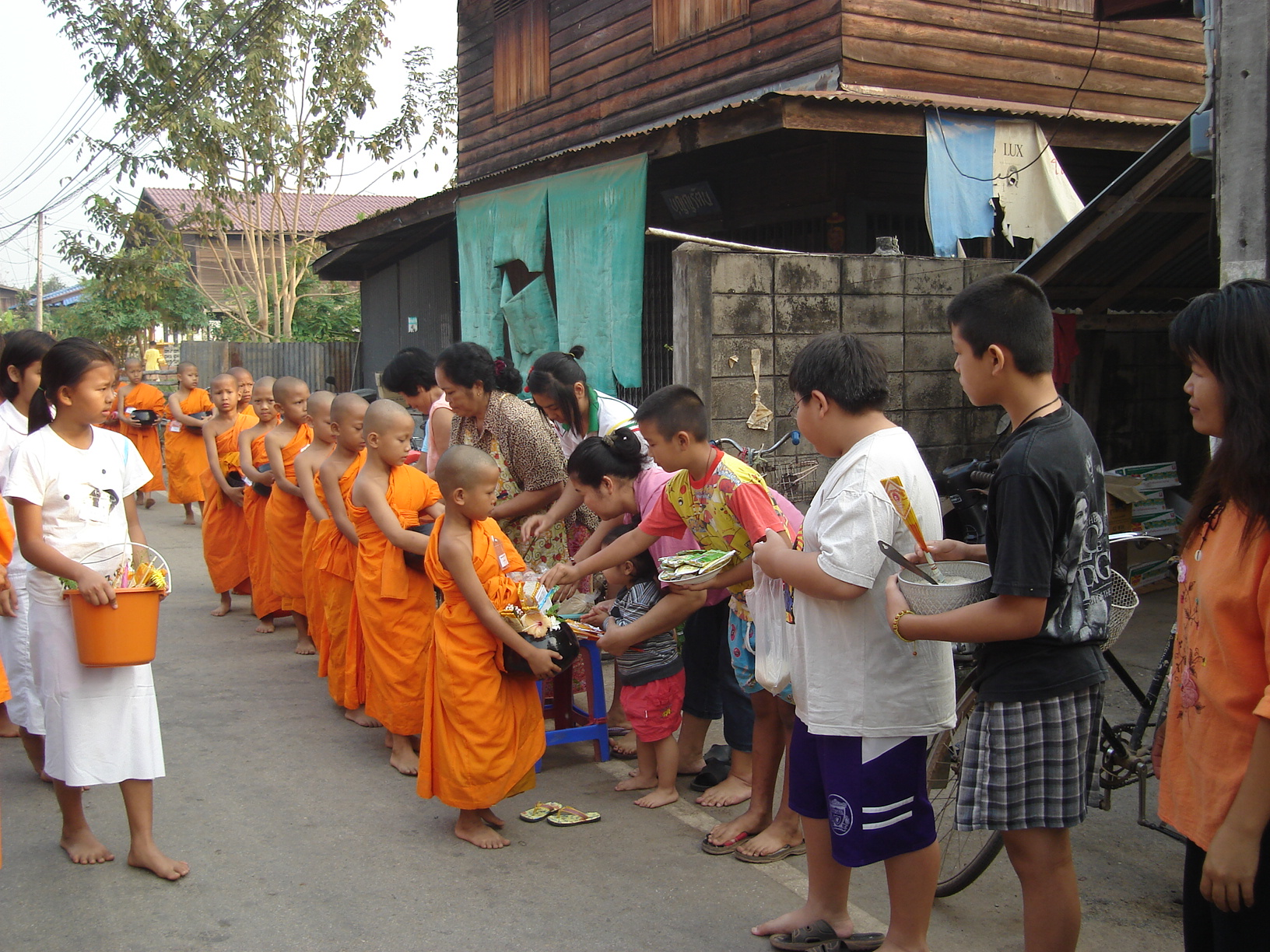
Buddhist monks receiving food from villagers

Thai form the second largest ethno-linguistic group among Buddhists in the world. The modern Thai are predominantly Theravada Buddhist and strongly identify their ethnic identity with their religious practices that include aspects of ancestor worship, among other beliefs of the ancient folklore of Thailand. Thais predominantly (more than 90%) avow themselves Buddhists. Since the rule of King Ramkhamhaeng of Sukhothai and again since the "orthodox reformation" of King Mongkut in the 19th century, it is modeled on the "original" Sri Lankan Theravada Buddhism. The Thais' folk belief however is a syncretic blend of the official Buddhist teachings, animistic elements that trace back to the original beliefs of Tai peoples, and Brahmin-Hindu elements from India, partly inherited from the Hindu Khmer Empire of Angkor.

The belief in local, nature and household spirits, that influence secular issues like health or prosperity, as well as ghosts (Thai: phi, ผี) is widespread. It is visible, for example, in so-called spirit houses (san phra phum) that may be found near many homes. Phi play an important role in local folklore, but also in modern popular culture, like television series and films. "Ghost films" (nang phi) are a distinct, important genre of Thai cinema.

Hinduism has left substantial and present marks on Thai culture. Some Thais worship Hindu gods like Ganesha, Shiva, Vishnu, or Brahma (e.g., at Bangkok's well-known Erawan Shrine). They do not see a contradiction between this practice and their primary Buddhist faith. The Thai national epic Ramakien is an adaption of the Hindu Ramayana. Hindu mythological figures like Devas, Yakshas, Nagas, gods and their mounts (vahana) characterise the mythology of Thais and are often depicted in Thai art, even as decoration of Buddhist temples. Thailand's national symbol Garuda is taken from Hindu mythology as well.

A characteristic feature of Thai Buddhism is the practice of tham boon (ทำบุญ) ("merit-making"). This can be done mainly by food and in-kind donations to monks, contributions to the renovation and adornment of temples, releasing captive creatures (fish, birds), etc. Moreover, many Thais idolise famous and charismatic monks, who may be credited with thaumaturgy or with the status of a perfected Buddhist saint (Arahant). Other significant features of Thai popular belief are astrology, numerology, talismans and amulets (often images of the revered monks)

Besides Thailand's two million Muslim Malays, there are an additional more than a million ethnic Thais who profess Islam, especially in the south, but also in greater Bangkok. As a result of missionary work, there is also a minority of approximately 500,000 Christian Thais: Catholics and various Protestant denominations. Buddhist temples in Thailand are characterized by tall golden stupas, and the Buddhist architecture of Thailand is similar to that in other Southeast Asian countries, particularly Cambodia and Laos, with which Thailand shares cultural and historical heritage.

== See also ==
- Ethnic groups in Thailand
- List of Thai actresses
- List of Thai actors
- List of Thai people
- Overseas Thai
- Peopling of Thailand
- Thai American
- Thai British
- Thai culture
- Thai folklore
- Thais in Hong Kong
- Thai marriage
- Thailand

== Bibliography ==
- Girsling, John L.S., Thailand: Society and Politics (Cornell University Press, 1981).
- Terwiel, B.J., A History of Modern Thailand (Univ. of Queensland Press, 1984).
- Wyatt, D.K., Thailand: A Short History (Yale University Press, 1986).
