= Tai Daeng language =

Tai language of Vietnam and Laos

Tai Daeng
- Red Tai; Táy-Môc-Châu
- ꪼꪕꪵꪒꪉ; Tay lɛɛŋ
- "Tai Daeng" written in Tai Viet script
- Region: Northwestern Vietnam; Northeastern Laos
- Ethnicity: Tai Daeng
- Native speakers: (105,000 cited 1999–2007)
- Language family: Kra–Dai: Tai; Southwestern (Thai); Chiang Saen; Tai Daeng
- Writing system: Tai Viet

Language codes
- ISO 639-3: tyr
- Glottolog: taid1249
- ELP: Tai Daeng
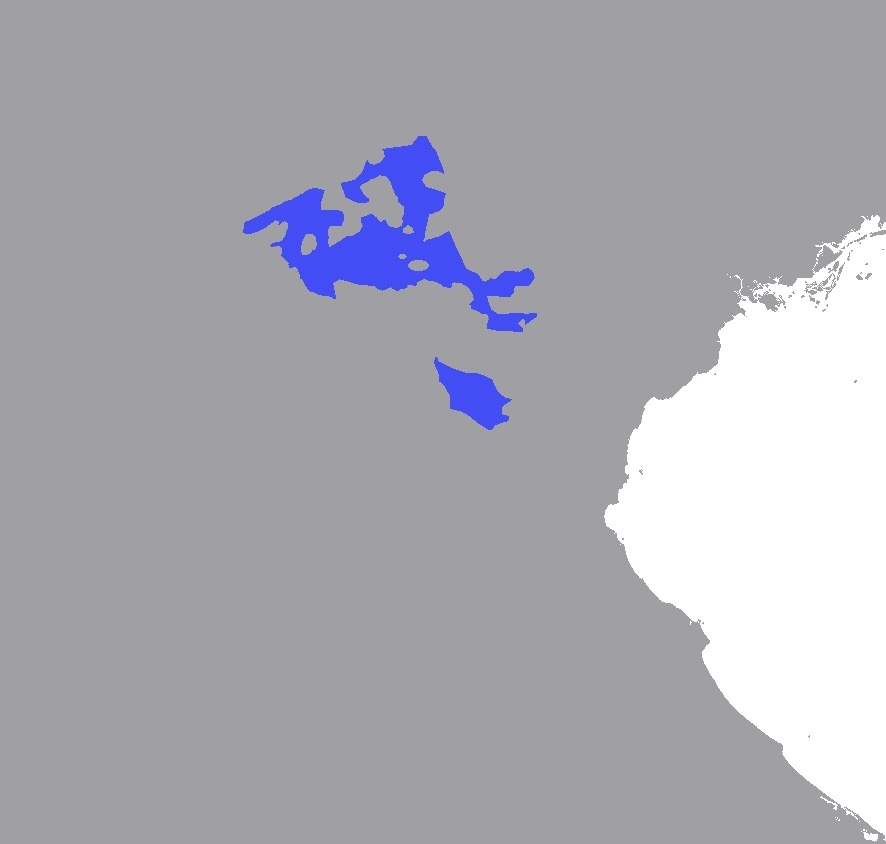

Tai Daeng, Táy-Môc-Châu or Red Tai is the language of the Tai Daeng people of northwestern Vietnam and across the border into northeastern Laos. It belongs to the Tai language family, being closely connected with Black Tai and White Tai, as well as being more distantly related to the language spoken in modern Thailand.

The language is classified as part of the Thái official ethnic community in Vietnam and of the Phu Tai composite group in Laos. However, speakers in Vietnam tend to identify with Black Tai, or Tai Dam, thus denying that they are Red Tai.

== Classification ==
Tai Daeng is classified as belonging to the Tai-Kadai language group, located in the Tai languages and Southwestern Tai languages subgroups. Tai Meuay is closely related to Tai Daeng.

== Geographic distribution ==
The number of Tai Daeng speakers is generally estimated at 80,000 native speakers, with an ethnic population of roughly 100,000 located mostly in Vietnam.

In China, Tai Daeng (Chinese: 傣亮) people are located in the following townships of Yunnan, with about 2,000 people (Gao 1999). They are referred to by the neighboring Han Chinese, Miao, and Yao peoples as Dry Tai (Gan Dai 旱傣).

- Qiaotou Town 桥头镇, Hekou County 河口县 (in the 3 villages of Shiyajiao 石崖脚, Baini 白尼, and Fangluocheng 方洛成; population 600)
- Gulingqing Township 古林菁乡, Maguan County 马关县 (in the 2 villages of Panzhihua 攀枝花 and Dongzong 董棕); population 500)

== Phonology ==
All syllables in Tai Daeng have an initial consonant or consonant cluster, followed by a vowel or a diphthong, and optionally end in a final consonant. Each syllable also carries a tone. Like many related languages, Tae Daeng has different possibilities for the realization of tone on different types of syllables, depending on the presence, absence, and type of final consonant.

Free syllables are those which end in a vowel, a nasal or a semivowel while checked syllables are those having a final p, t, k or a glottal stop. Tae Daeng has five tones on free syllables:

- 1. Rising from middle pitch to high pitch and then leveling off: huu 'ear', taa 'eye'
- 2. Level and high, slightly lower than the highest point of the first tone: say 'egg', faa 'to split'
- 3. Low rising and glottalized: hay 'to weep' or 'dry field', haa 'five', naŋ 'to sit'
- 4. Mid with slight and gradual fall: naa 'rice field', cim 'to taste'
- 5. High falling, glottalized: nɔŋ 'younger sibling', haay 'bad'

The first tone can employ glottalization, but is not mandatory. Tae Daeng has two tones on checked syllables:

- 2. Level, mid or somewhat higher than mid: lap 'to close (the eyes)' or 'to harpen', mat 'flea' or 'to tie up in a bundle', bɔɔk 'flower'
- 3. Low rising: moot 'one'. According to Gedney, the nucleus of syllables of this type is always a diphthong or a phonetically long vowel.

== Grammar ==
=== Morphology ===
Tae Deang frequently employs serial verb construction in which two or more verbs are strung together in one clause.

=== Syntax ===
Tae Daeng employs a Subject-Verb-Object word order and because of the lack of inflections upon verbs, syntactical functions are largely derived from word order and prepositions. Particles are highly adaptive and can usually be found at the end of a sentence in order to emphasize, question, command or indicate a level of familiarity or respect.

== Writing system ==
Tai Daeng differs from its close relations White Tai and Black Tai in that, while it doesn't feature a writing system of its own, speakers make occasional usage of the Tai Viet script.
