= Isan people =

Ethnic group native to northeastern Thailand

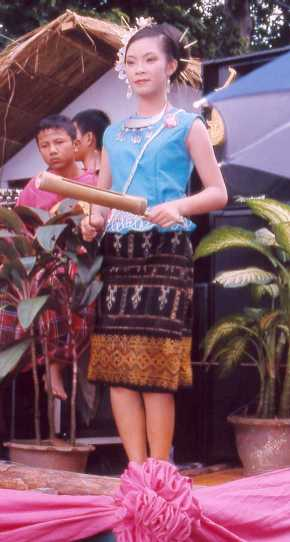
- Isan woman wearing traditional Sinh at Ubon Ratchathani Candle Festival

Total population
- 22 million

Regions with significant populations
- Northeastern Thailand and Greater Bangkok (Internal migration)

Languages
- Isan (Lao), Phu Thai, Central Thai

Religion
- Theravada Buddhism and Tai folk religion

Related ethnic groups
- Other Tai peoples

- Isan

Thai name
- Thai: คนอีสาน
- RTGS: Khon Isan
- IPA: [kʰōn ʔīːsǎːn]

Lao name
- Lao: ຄົນອີສານ

Burmese name
- Burmese: အီသန် လူမျိုး

Chart shows the peopling of Thailand.

The Isan people (Thai: คนอีสาน, RTGS: Khon Isan, Thai pronunciation: [kʰōn ʔīːsǎːn]; Northeastern Thai: คนอีสาน, pronounced [kʰo᷇n ʔīː.sǎːn]; Lao: ຄົນອີສານ, pronounced [kʰón ʔìː.sǎːn]; Burmese: အီသန် လူမျိုး) or literally Northeastern people are an ethnic group native to Northeastern Thailand with an estimated population of about 22 million. Alternative terms for this group are T(h)ai Isan, Thai-Lao, Lao Isan, or Isan Lao. Like Central Thai (Siamese) and Lao, they belong to the linguistic family of Tai peoples. Other transliteration spellings include Isaan and Isarn from the Thai อีสาน (Northeast).

In a broader sense, everyone who comes from the 20 northeastern provinces of Thailand may be called khon isan. In the narrower sense, the term refers only to the ethnic Lao who make up the majority population in most parts of the region. After the failed Lao Rebellion in 1826, the region witnessed mass forced population transfers of ethnic Lao into Isan. Following the separation of Isan from the historical Lao Kingdom, its integration into the Thai nation state and the central government's policy of "Thaification", they have developed a distinct regional identity that differs both from the Laotians of Laos and the Thais of Central Thailand. Integration of this identity into Thai national identity began around 1900, accelerated during the fascist era, was aggressively pursued during the Cold War, and is maintained today, although in 2011, Thailand officially recognized the Lao identity to the United Nations. Even during the height of the Cold War, the level of this integration was very high, as measured by expression of nationalist sentiments. Even today, the Isan people are some of the most nationalist in Thailand; many of them are more nationalist than the Central Thai. As such, during the height of Thailand's 'color wars' in the late 2000s and early 2010s, the mainly Isan-based Red Shirts were not calling for separatism but a return to democracy, in support of the Pheu Thai party.

Almost all inhabitants of Thailand's Northeast are Thai nationals. Yet a majority of them (approximately 80%) are ethnically Lao and speak a variant of the Lao language when at home (the three main Lao dialects spoken in Northeastern Thailand are summarized as the Isan language). To avoid being subjected to derogatory stereotypes and perceptions associated with Lao-speaking people, most prefer to call themselves khon isan.

== Official status ==
Thailand's longstanding policy was not to regard Isan as a separate ethnicity, based on the principle of considering all Tai groups living in Thailand as part of the Central Thai people. This successfully downplayed the majority Lao ethnicity and led to the development of a distinct regional Isan identity, which is, nonetheless, multi ethnic.

In 2011, Thailand recognized almost all its ethnolinguistic identities. The following table shows all the officially recognized ethnolinguistic groups of Northeast Thailand. The source, a 2011 country report to the International Convention for the Elimination of All Forms of Racial Discrimination, uses revised (2004) Mahidol University Ethnolinguistic Maps of Thailand data (1997), which provides population numbers for most Northeast Thailand ethnic groups. Subsequently, in 2015, the Ministry of Social Development and Human Security's 2015 Master Plan for the Development of Ethnic Groups in Thailand 2015-2017 officially recognized the majority of the Northeast's peoples, the main exception being the 'Thai Lao' group. Further, it did not recognize the 'Isan' ethnic identity.

== Ethnology ==
The first Western scholar to identify and study the distinct "ethno-regional" identity of khon isan was the US anthropologist Charles F. Keyes in 1967. He chose to categorize them as a "ethno-regional" group rather than an ethnic minority, given that their "cultural differences have been taken to be characteristic of a particular part of the country rather than of a distinctive people." He has, nonetheless, consistently described them as being formed mainly of the ethnic Lao group.

== Language ==
About 88% of the people habitually speak the Isan language at home, while 11% say they speak both Isan and Central Thai among themselves, and only 1% speak Central Thai exclusively. "Isan", "Lao" and "Thai" languages form a dialect continuum, in many cases the linguistic varieties do not coincide with the geographical and political boundaries. Defining and differentiating these three "languages" according to objective, linguistic criteria is impossible. The different terms are rather used for political and emotional reasons. In official contexts as well as in school and university classes, only Standard Thai is allowed. There are hardly any mass media publishing or broadcasting in Isan. Many Isan people, especially the younger and well-educated ones as well as those living in towns or outside their native region, master standard Thai on a native or near-native level. Some of them are even shy to speak their original language with their own parents, and in public or in the presence of Thais from other regions due to the low social prestige. Many Central Thais, but also some Isan speakers, associate the Isan language with being uneducated and backward. Therefore, many Isan practice diglossia (i.e. Isan in familiar and informal contexts, standard Thai in public and official ones) or code-switching in their everyday lives. Despite effectively being banned in official discourse, since at least the 1997 Thai constitution, the Isan language has been used publicly within the Northeast for communicating Thai discourses, including political discourses, and there has been a recent resurgence in assertion of the Lao identity, including language.

== Process of acculturation ==
From the late nineteenth century into the 1930s, the Siamese and then Thai states employed diverse means to integrate the people of the former Lao principalities into the Thai state, including military conscription, forced labour, the introduction of Thai provincial administrative systems, the Siamese monarchy, the Siamese religious sangha and Buddhist calendar (as opposed to the Lao sangha and religious calendar or hit sipsong khong sipsii), and a national education system and bureaucracy. Thai sociopolitical integration of the Isan people into Siam was in some cases met with insurrection in the form of the Holy Men's Rebellions. In the late 1930s, the Thai Cultural Mandates were deployed; by this period, acculturation included the burning of ancient Lao Buddhist manuscripts and records, in order to eliminate Lao culture, especially Lao literacy. In the 1950s, during the Cold War, acculturation accelerated, incorporating more determined and institutionalized state development that included a sacralized bureaucracy, economic development, mandatory primary and then secondary education, health programs, infrastructure (roads and rail) and media (print and radio, followed by television) programs, inspired by Thai nationalism and utilizing the Thai monarchy as a unifying symbol. The overall result was a significant shift towards the Thai language and Thai dress norms, combined with a greater awareness of Thai national identity as defined by adoption of national symbols (e.g., the Thai flag and photographs of the Thai monarch in homes) and reverence towards the Thai Sangha and the Thai monarchy. The integration of Isan people into Thai national identity was generally successful, though with significant structural inequalities remaining, meaning socioeconomic and political integration remain problematic. However, cultural assimilation in terms of, for example, food, music and language was never complete, more hybridized, and in more recent years, there has been a resurgence in some of the local Isan regional and ethnic cultural identities, such as Phu Thai and Lao. This has been due in part to greater multiculturalism and political decentralization beginning in the late 1990s, following the 1997 constitution and 1999 Education Act, as well as the work of institutes working on language and cultural maintenance and revitalization, such as Mahidol University's Research Institute for Languages and Cultures of Asia (RILCA).

Around the 1990s, although the perceived political oppression continues and Thaification policies remain, attitudes towards regional languages relaxed. Academics at Isan universities began exploring the local language, history, culture and other folklore, publishing works that helped bring serious attention to preserving the Lao features of the language and landscape, albeit under an Isan banner. Students can participate in clubs that promote the local music, sung in the local Lao language, or local dances native to the area. Knowledge about the history of the region and its long neglect and abuse by Siamese authorities and resurrection of pride in local culture are coming to the fore, increasing expressions of 'Isan-ness' in the region. However, Thaification policies and the language shift to Thai continue unabated. Recognition of the Isan language as an important regional language of Thailand did not provide any funding for its preservation or maintenance other than a token of acknowledgement of its existence.

== Migration ==
Millions of people have migrated from Isan to the Bangkok agglomeration seeking work and they constitute at least one-fourth of the capital's population. About 8,000 from Isan live in Laos on the eastern bank of the Mekong River, which forms much of the border with Thailand. Others have emigrated to Malaysia, Singapore, and western countries such as Australia and the United States.

Migrant workers from Isan in Bangkok filled the role of construction workers, taxi drivers, cleaners, vendors, dishwashers, domestics, prostitutes and other menial professions, often settling in shanty towns on the outskirts of the city. The Isan people faced discrimination for their humble, Lao origins, accents perceived as hilarious, darker features and low-class professions but the extra money earned was sent to support family back home, and remittances such as these remain an important part of the Isan Region's GDP today. The seasonal migrations were also spurned by the economic crash at the end of the Vietnam War, when large air bases were built in Isan and large numbers of US military stationed there provided a brief window of prosperity in the region.

== Politics ==
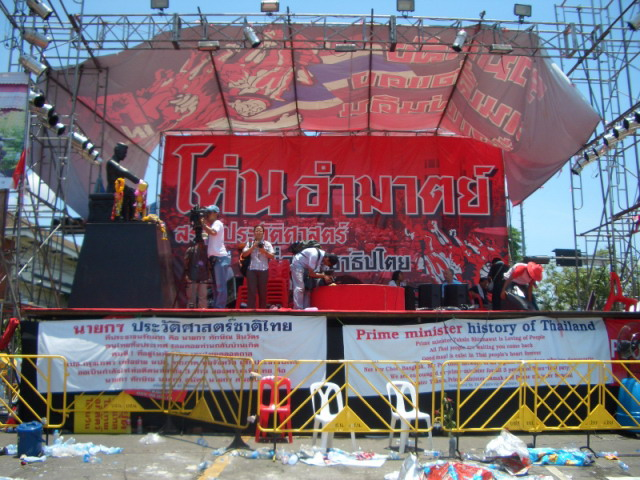
Red Shirt political stage. Many Isan people joined the movement, protesting the ouster of PM Thaksin in 2006 and subsequent nullifications of candidates and parties attached to him.

Air bases built in Isan and US troops stationed there exposed the Isan people to direct westernisation and adoption of more liberal social attitudes, helping foment a unique identity. Identification with 'Lao' identity became even more problematic, as the Isan people were always viewed as a fifth column ready to support their Lao brethren. Although the fear was exaggerated, members of the Lao Issara were able to find refuge in Isan during World War II, and communist supporters of the Pathét Lao often crossed and gained recruitments from the local Isan people.

Isan politicians tended to be mistrustful of Bangkok, believed in decentralisation of government and promoted strong development of regional economies and tended to be more leftist than the parties in power. Political repression of Isan included the assassination of political leaders in the 1930s and 1950s, the disrobement of monks in the 1970s critical of the government's role in the sangha and the return of military leaders. Crackdowns of political dissidents occurred throughout the 1960s, 1970s and 1980s until the threat of communism was diminished. The continued outlawing of parties supported by or purportedly funded by Thaksin Shinawatra, who was widely popular in Isan, was seen as continued affront to both democracy in Thailand and representation of Isan people in Thai politics, thus many Isan people were avid supporters of the Red Shirts.

== Discrimination ==
Until the 1980s, when the road infrastructure and more relaxed attitudes towards regional cultural awareness began to take root, it was common for Isan people to face severe prejudice and discrimination. Isan culture, although similar, was at the same time quite exotic, with the pungent foods and rural people referred to as 'stinky' and the people 'stupid' and 'lazy'. The isolated rural region continues to be Thailand's least educated, least urban, least developed and least integrated region of the country, which can be seen in the numbers. More than three-fourths of Isan's people are engaged in agriculture despite the challenges of floods, droughts and infertile soils but only generated 10.9 per cent of Thailand's gross domestic product in 2013. Isan culture and language immediately conjure up images of ignorant yokels, backwards traditionalists and country bumpkins.

Beginning in the mid-twentieth century, as new lands to develop were no longer available, Isan people began to migrate to Bangkok and other tourist areas or major cities to seek work during the dry season, when there was little activity on the farms, or permanently, sending occasional remittances to family members back home. Restricted by prejudice and lack of skills and education beyond farming, Isan people competed with migrant workers for menial jobs such as street sweepers, janitors, nannies, taxi drivers, porters, shoeshiners, vendors and construction workers, among others. Many establish shantytowns and slums on the outskirts of the city. As a result of their rural roots and the ranks of Bangkok's urban poor, the Isan are often depicted as ignorant buffoons, naïve rural people, domestics in a Thai home or dimwitted, petty criminals.

== Socioeconomic position ==
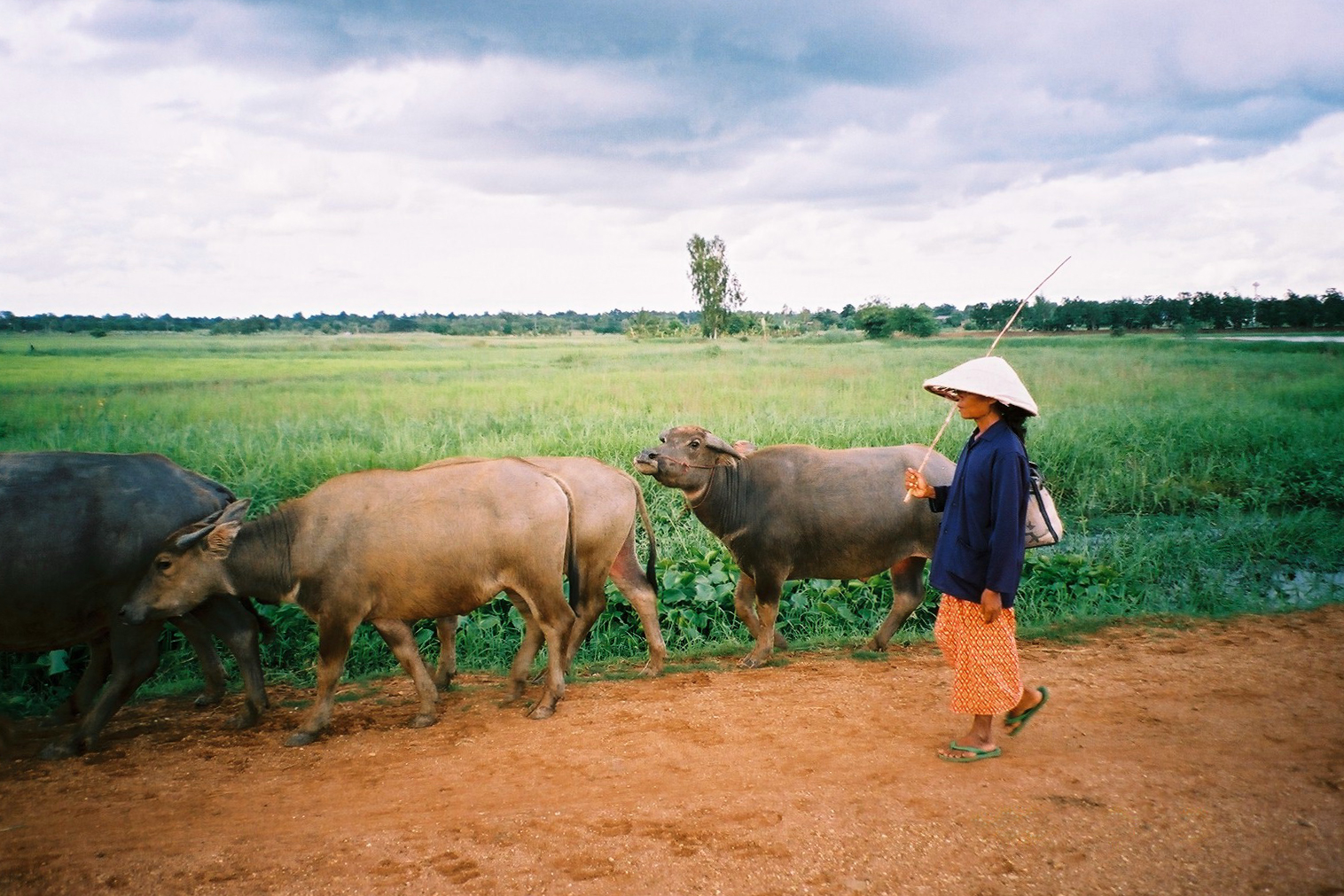
An ethnic Isan woman walking her water buffalo to pasture. Isan people are primarily engaged in wet-rice agriculture, despite arid conditions and a flat topography that makes it prone to flooding during heavy monsoons.

The socioeconomic integration of the Isan people is an unfinished and ongoing project, and the ethnic minorities of Northeast Thailand are heavily affected by the regional disparities that plague Thailand in terms of, for instance, socioeconomic and educational outcomes. For the period of the 1970s and 1980s, the lower outcomes experienced by the Isan people has been described as internal colonialism due to Isan people filling a cultural class role as construction workers, gardeners, and maids for the Central Thai. More recently, it has led to the integration of Isan people being characterized as 'integration without inclusion'. A 2019 Asia Foundation report highlighted that Isan people were less affected by poverty than in the past, except in rural areas; that their incomes were stagnant, though they were optimistic for the future; that most people still owned land, but that it was unproductive; they experienced extremely high levels of household debt; that fewer of them were now migrating to other regions of Thailand; that a high percentage of survey respondents supported greater development and industrialization in the region; that most were actually satisfied with educational quality; and that Thailand's universal health courage scheme was greatly benefiting them. The report concludes by pointing out that, contrary to stigma, Isan people are not "unsophisticated peasants".

== See also ==
- Demographics of Isan
- Lao people in Thailand
- History of Isan
- Northern Khmer people
