= Tay Khang language =

Tai language of Laos

Tay Khang
- Native to: Laos
- Native speakers: 1,500 (2003)
- Language family: Kra–Dai: Tai; Southwestern?; Tay Khang

Language codes
- ISO 639-3: Either: kyp – Kang (duplicate) tnu – Tay Khang
- Glottolog: tayk1238
- ELP: Tay Khang
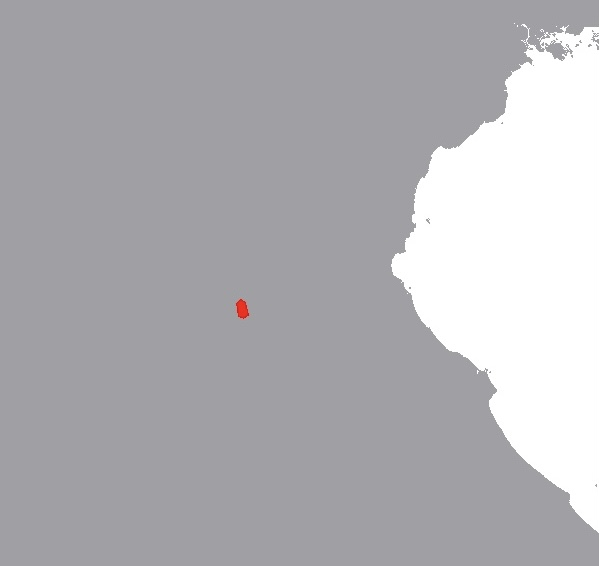

Tay Khang, or just Kang, is a Tai language of Laos. There is confusion with Kháng. Schliesinger (2003) reports an area of habitation being in Bolikhamsai Province, Laos.

Religion of speakers are Theravada Buddhism and animism.

An audio recording in this language by Michel Ferlus is available online from the Pangloss Collection.
