= Phu Thai language =

Southwestern Tai language

Phu Thai
- ภาษาผู้ไท
- Native to: Thailand, Laos and Vietnam
- Native speakers: 900,000 (2002–2015)
- Language family: Kra–Dai: Tai; Southwestern (Thai); Lao – Phuthai; Phu Thai
- Writing system: Thai script

Language codes
- ISO 639-3: pht
- Glottolog: phut1244
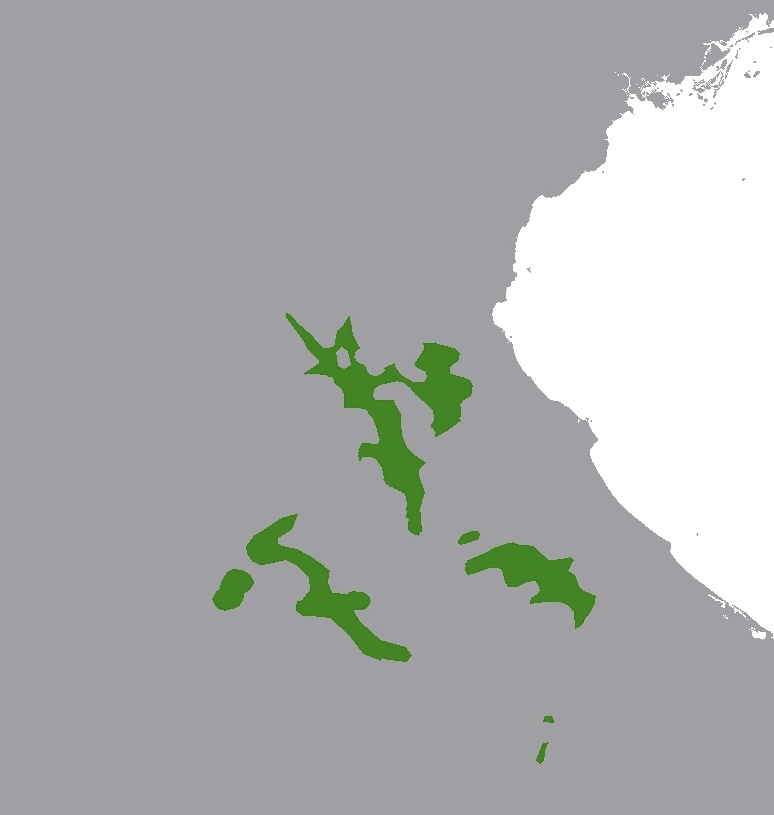

Phu Thai (Phuu Thai; Thai, Phu Thai: Phasa Phu Thai, ภาษาผู้ไท or ภูไท) is a Southwestern Tai language spoken in Laos, Thailand and Vietnam. Although it appears different from the Isan and the Lao languages, it is spoken in areas where these languages are predominant and has been influenced by them. Comparisons of Phu Thai with other Tai languages such as Tay Khang have not yet been done systematically enough to yield convincing results.

Another aspect of Phu Thai is its contact with the Katuic languages, a branch of the Austroasiatic languages. Whether in the Phu Thai areas of Central Laos or in more recent locations of Northeastern Thailand, one can find, along with Phu Thai, a few Katuic dialects known locally as Bru, So or Katang. James R. Chamberlain (2012) focusing on anthropological issues describes “the Phou Thay – Brou relationship” as a “symbiosis” and states that “the Phou Thay – Brou relationship has never evolved into a feudal system”.

== Speakers ==
Speakers of the Phu Thai language in Thailand numbered about 156,000 in 1993. They can be found mainly in the areas around Mukdahan, especially Khamcha-i District, Nakhon Phanom, Kalasin and Sakon Nakhon. Phu Thai speakers live as well in the Khammouane and Savannakhet Province of Laos. Some speakers have been reported in Salavan, and Champasak Provinces of Laos, in Hoa Binh province of Vietnam, and possibly also in China. There is little dialect differentiation between the varieties spoken in central Laos and in northeastern Thailand.

Speakers identified as (or identifying themselves as) Phu Thai or Phu Tai in Vietnam speak other dialects with different tone systems.

Tai Gapong or Tai Kapong found in the Nape District of Ban Nahuong, Bolikhamsai Province, Laos speak a slightly different dialect.

In Vietnam the Phu Thai are included in the group of the Thái people, together with the Thái Đen ('Black Tai'), Thái Đỏ ('Red Tai'), Thái Trắng ('White Tai'), Tày Thanh and Thái Hàng Tổng. The group of the Thái people is the third largest of the fifty-four ethnic groups recognized by the Vietnamese government.

== Status ==
Despite its rich heritage, and regional use, in Thailand this language group is increasingly becoming integrated into the mainstream Isan language.

== Phonology ==
The following information is of the Waritchaphum dialect:

=== Consonants ===
		Labial	Dental/ Alveolar	(Alveolo-) Palatal	Velar		Glottal
		Labial	Dental/ Alveolar	(Alveolo-) Palatal	plain	lab.	Glottal
Plosive	tenuis	p	t		k	kʷ	ʔ
Plosive	aspirated	pʰ	tʰ		kʰ	kʷʰ	
Plosive	voiced	b	d				
Affricate				tɕ			
Nasal		m	n	ɲ	ŋ		
Fricative		f	s				h
Approximant		ʋ	l	j		w	

Final consonants
	Labial	Alveolar	Palatal	Velar	Glottal
Plosive	p	t		k	ʔ
Nasal	m	n		ŋ	
Approximant			j	w	

- Final plosive sounds /p t k/ can be realized as unreleased [p̚ t̚ k̚].

=== Vowels ===
	Front	Back	
	Front	unrounded	rounded
Close	i	ɯ	u
Mid	e	ɤ	o
Open	ɛ	a	ɔ

- Diphthong sounds consist of a single vowel with a final glide sound, /j/ or /w/.
