= Mường Khương district =

Coordinates: 22.667°N 104.083°E

Mường Khương District Huyện Mường Khương
- District
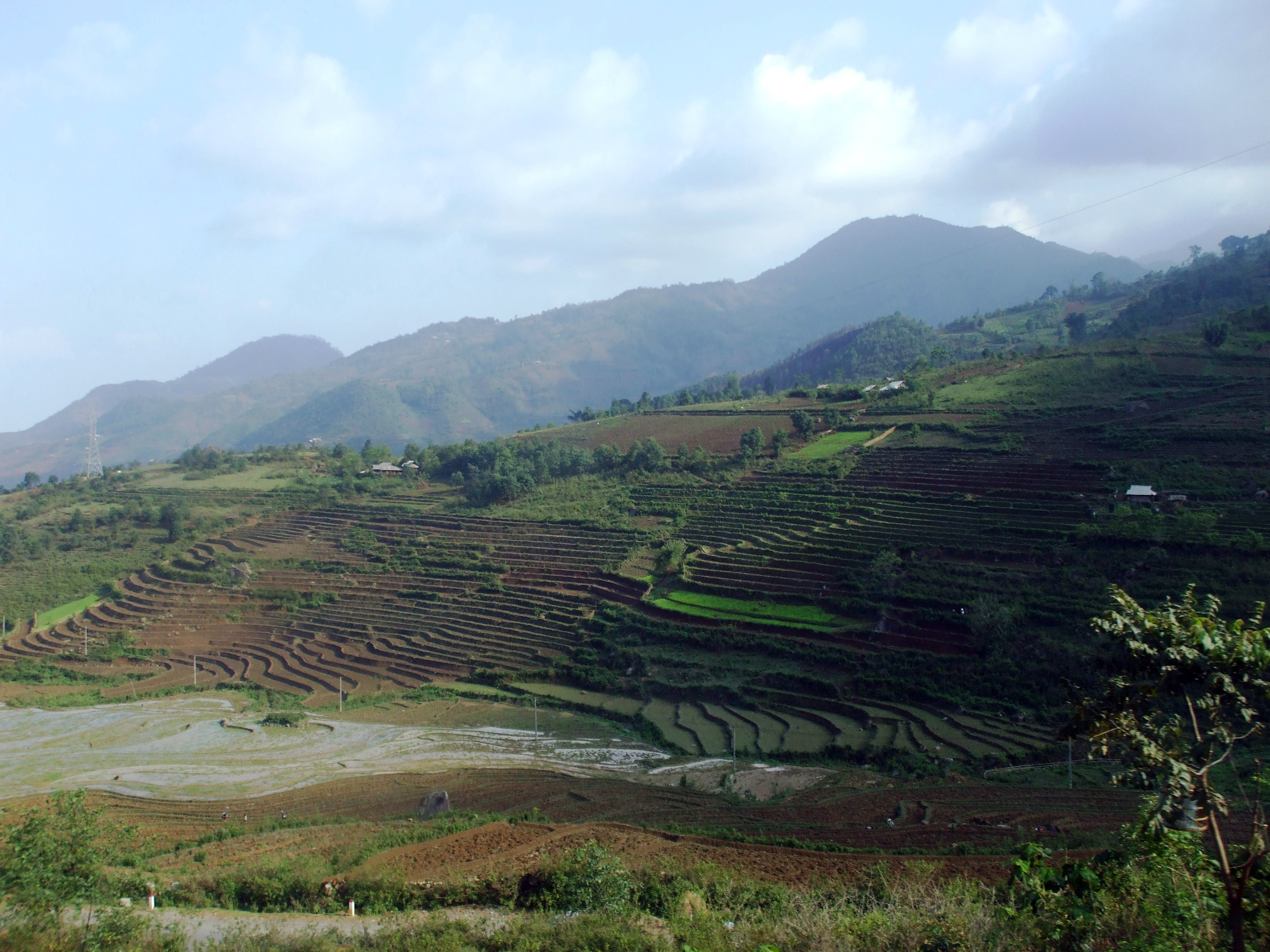
- Mường Khương rice terrace

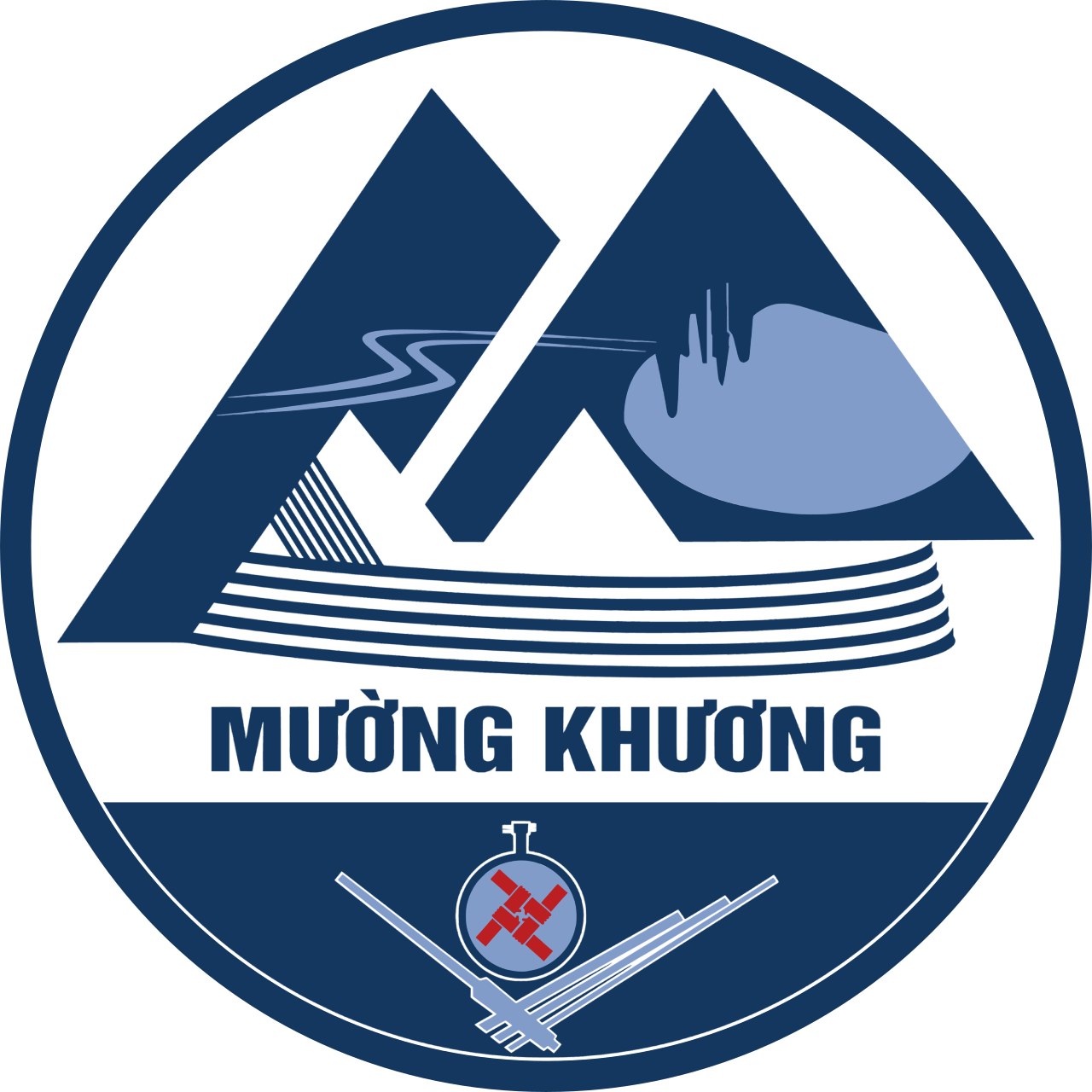
- Seal
- Interactive map of Mường Khương District
- Country: Vietnam
- Region: Northeast
- Province: Lào Cai
- Capital: Mường Khương

Area
  - Total: 213 sq mi (552 km^{2})

Population (2003)
  - Total: 48,242
- Time zone: UTC+7 (Indochina Time)

Mường Khương is a former rural district of Lào Cai province in the Northeast region of Vietnam. Mường is as variation of Mueang. As of 2003, the district had a population of 48,242. The district covers an area of 552 km^{2}. The district capital lies at Mường Khương.

== Administrative divisions ==
Mường Khương, Lào Ca, Cao Sơn, Bản Lầu, Nậm Chảy, Tung Chung Phố, Tả Gia Khâu, Pha Long, Dìn Chin, Tả Ngải Chồ, Thanh Bình, Bản Sen, Lùng Khấu Nhin, La Pan Tẩn, Nấm Lư, Tả Thàng and Lùng Vai.

Mường is a variation of Mueang.
