= Theraphan Luangthongkum =

Thai linguist

- ธีระพันธ์ เหลืองทองคำ
- Born: Thailand
- Other name: Theraphan L-Thongkum
- Occupation: Linguist

Academic work
- Institutions: Chulalongkorn University
- Main interests: Tai languages, Austroasiatic languages

Theraphan Luangthongkum (Thai: ธีระพันธ์ เหลืองทองคำ, RTGS: Thiraphan Lueangthongkham; also cited variously as L-Thongkum, L. Thongkum or Thongkum in publications) is a Thai linguist, specializing in phonetics, linguistic fieldwork, lexicography and minority languages of Southeast Asia. She is currently a faculty member of the Department of Linguistics, the Faculty of Arts, Chulalongkorn University, Thailand.

In 2010 she was awarded an honorary membership by the Linguistics Society of America, making her the first Thai linguist to receive this honor.

== Education ==
Luangthongkum graduated from the Faculty of Arts, Chulalongkorn University in 1968 with a BA (2nd class honors) in English. She then went to the University of California, Davis, where she received her MA in linguistics in 1970. With a scholarship from the Ford Foundation, she furthered her studies in phonetics at the University of Edinburgh, where she obtained her Ph.D. in 1977 presenting the thesis 'Rhythm in standard Thai'.

== Awards ==
- Distinguished Researcher Award (Humanities), National Research Council of Thailand (NRCT), 2002.
- Outstanding Research Award (Humanities), National Research Council of Thailand (NRCT), 2002.
- Distinguished Professor Award (Humanities), Chulalongkorn University, 2003.
- Distinguished Professor Award, The Eakin Laugesen Memorial Fund, 2006.
- Distinguished Research Award, the Academic Affairs Section, the Thailand Research Fund (TRF), 2007.
