= Pira Sudham =

Thai author

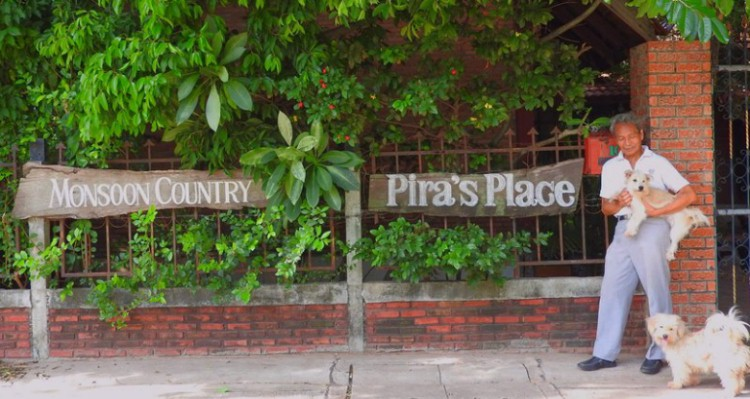
- Pira Sudham at home in Napo
- Born: Pira Canning Sudham; Isan, Thailand
- Education: Victoria University of Wellington
- Occupation: Thai English-language author
- Writing career
- Subject: Thailand's social-political transition
- Website: www.psudham.com

Pira Sudham (Pira Canning Sudham) (Thai: พีระ สุธรรม, RTGS: Phira Sutham), is an author of Thai descent. He was born in a village in Isan in northeastern Thailand. At age fourteen, he left Isan for Bangkok to become a servant to Buddhist monks in a monastery where he attended secondary school. Later, he attended Triam Udom High School, before gaining a place at the Faculty of Arts, Chulalongkorn University. He won a New Zealand government scholarship to read English Literature at Auckland University and then Victoria University of Wellington, where his first story was published by New Zealand's leading literary quarterly Landfall. Since then, Pira Sudham has been writing short stories, poems, and novels in English. He has not produced any literary works in the Thai language.

== Literary works ==
Pira Sudham's literary works, particularly "Monsoon Country" and its sequel "The Force of Karma" portray social and political transition in the shadowed kingdom, involving one of the richest men in the world and several prominent European personalities. They include a formidable German composer, a Bavarian orchestra conductor, an English antiquarian, a University of London graduate (the Yorkshire blond) and an impoverished Thai family living in the northeastern region of Thailand. The works cover the political turmoil and a massacre of pro-democracy activists in October 1973, the massacre of students at Thammasat University in October 1976 and the killing of protesters in the streets of Bangkok in May 1992.

His short stories in "Tales of Thailand" and "People of Esarn - The Damned of Thailand & The Kingdom in Conflicts" deal with the subjects of deforestation, child trafficking, slavery, prostitution, sex tourism, the drug trade, land loss, forced relocation and pollution.

== Personal life ==
Pira Sudham (Pira Canning Sudham) has lived over twenty years in New Zealand, Australia, Hong Kong and in the UK, writing short stories, poems, and his first novel, Monsoon Country. He lives in his home village in Isan, Northeastern Thailand.

== Publications ==
- Siamese Drama, a collection of short stories published by Siam Media International, Bangkok, in 1983. The author included more stories in the new collection, which was published under the title of "Tales of Thailand" by Shire Asia Publishers, Bangkok, in 1986.
- People of Esarn, a collection of stories about the people of Isan, was published by Shire Asia Publishers, Bangkok, in 1987 The book was expanded into two parts, namely "People of Esarn – The Damned of Thailand and The Kingdom in Conflicts" and was published by Shire Asia Publishers in 2007.
- Monsoon Country, a novel, was published by Shire Asia Publishers, Bangkok, 1988. The book has been revised and published in several editions including Rothershire Edition, Breakwater Edition (USA & Canada), Mahanaga Edition, Shadowed Country Edition and Castlecourt Edition.
- Monsoon Country, an eBook, 2022 edition.
- The Force of Karma A sequel to "Monsoon Country", was published by Shire Asia Publishers, Bangkok, in 2002. The novel has had several editions, including Castlecraft Edition.
- The Force of Karma, an eBook, 2022 edition.
- Shadowed Country, a hardback edition, combining "Monsoon Country" with its sequel, "The Force of Karma", was published by Asiashire, Bangkok, in 2004.
- IT is the People: of Thailand and Other Countries, an ebook of an anthology of Pira Sudham's short stories, was published by DCO, Bangkok, in 2014. The collection includes a little monk's lament, a confession of a transvestite, a reflection of an Englishman's wife, tales of survival in Bangkok by a little guttersnipe and a street food seller, a revelation of a prostitute, a recollection of a British prisoner of war, working on the Death Railway, a tale of a young Thai girl in search of love in Germany, a narrative on life of a child prostitute and an Italian's Asian adventure, and a gunman's change of heart.
- Pira Sudham's Last Three Stories: Operation Mopping Up, A War on the Streets of Bangkok and To Australia and Back, eBook edition.
- Escape to Australia, a story about a survivor of the massacre of protesting students at Thammasat University in 1973, eBook edition from Amazon and other online retailers (a parting shot).
- A Hunted Hunter, a story inspired by the imprisonment of the former prime minister of Thailand, Thaksin Shinawatra, who was found guilty of corruption.
