= Isan =

Region of northeastern Thailand

Coordinates: 16°N 103°E

Northeastern Region ภาคตะวันออกเฉียงเหนือ
- Region
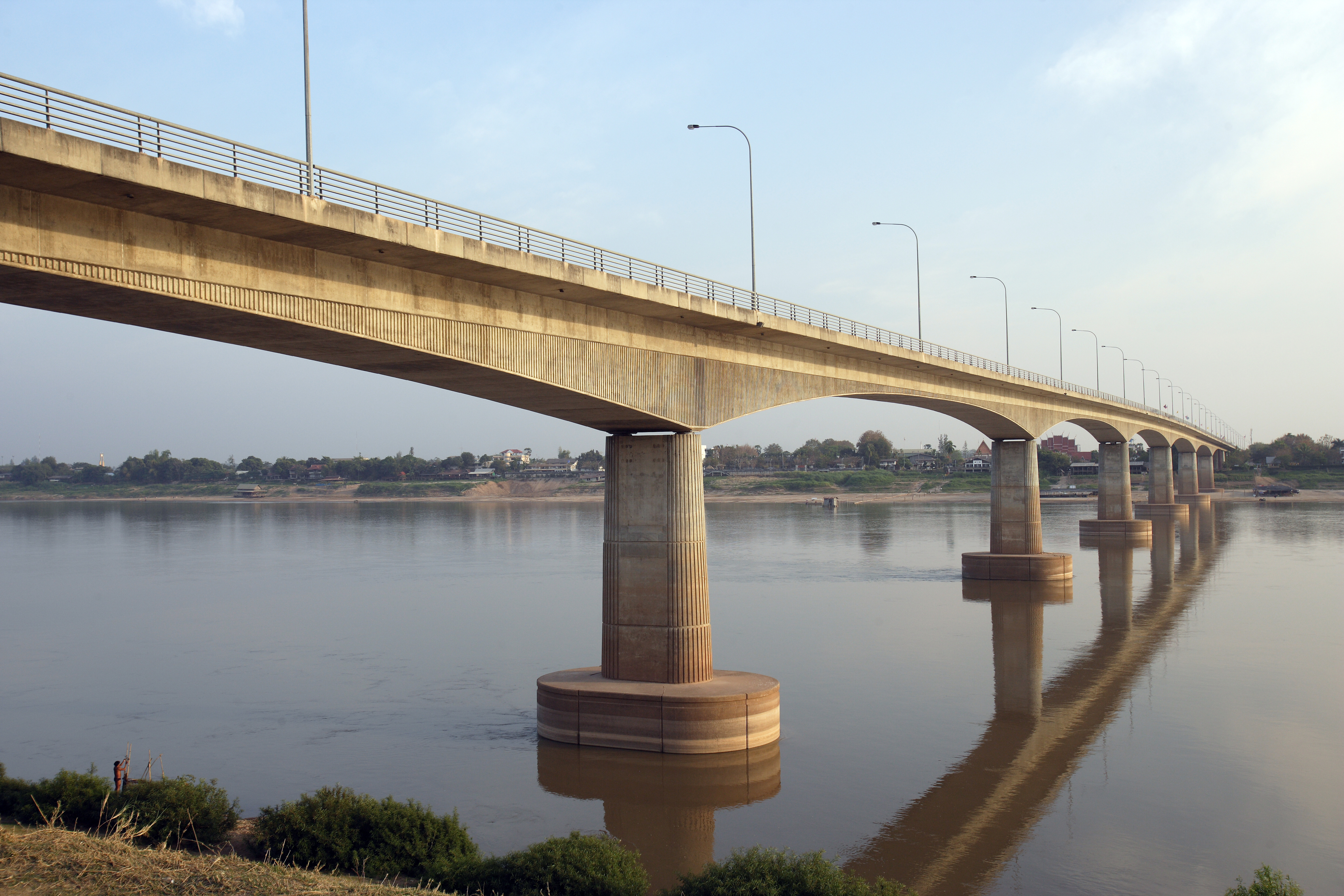
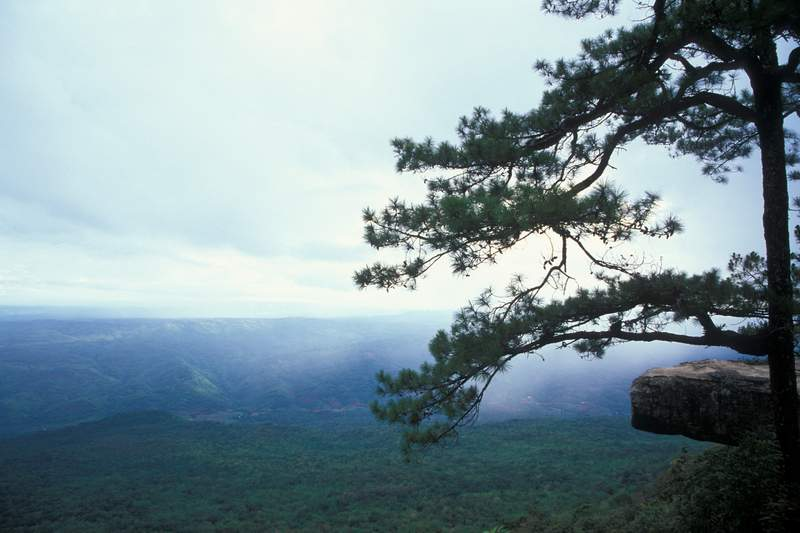
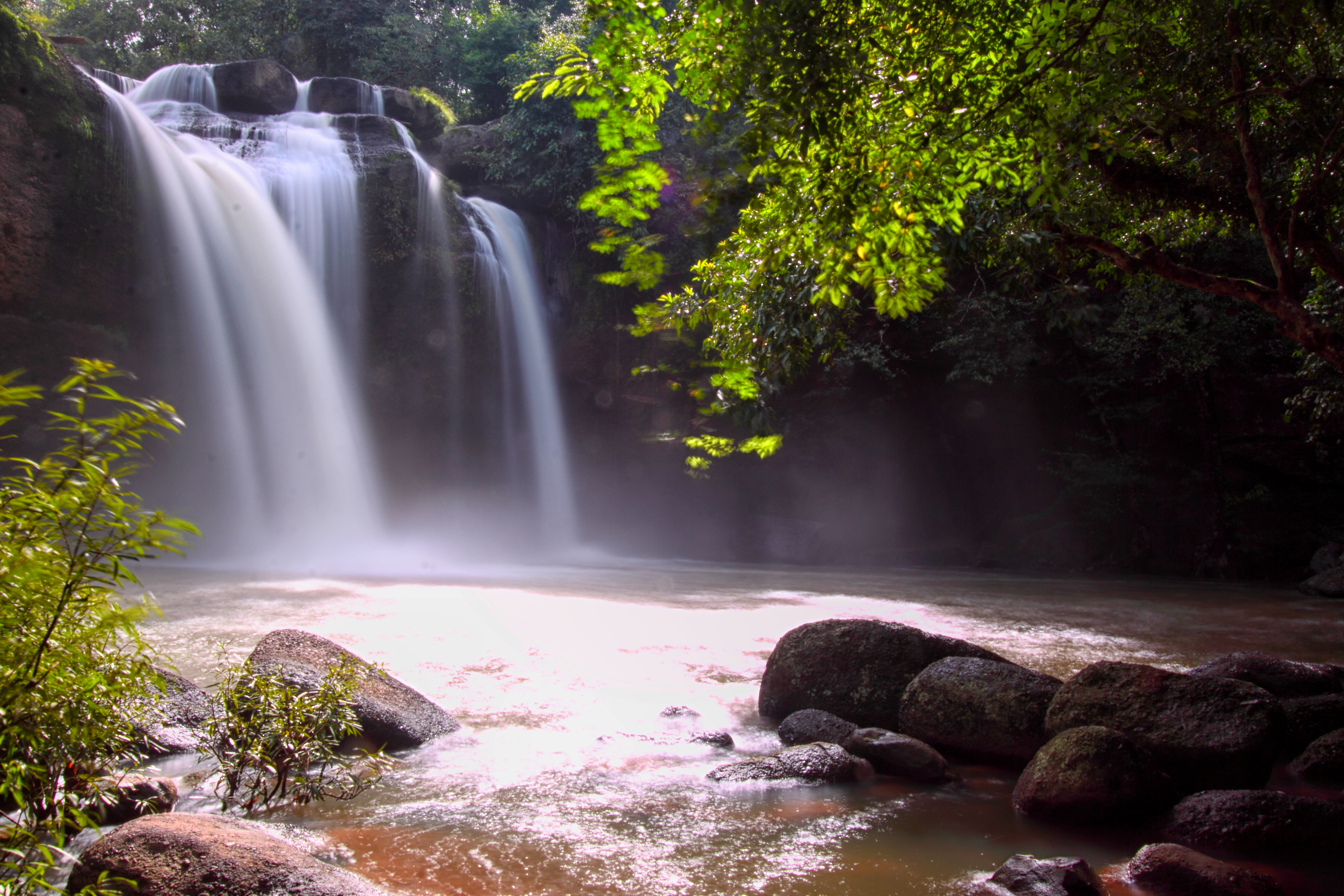
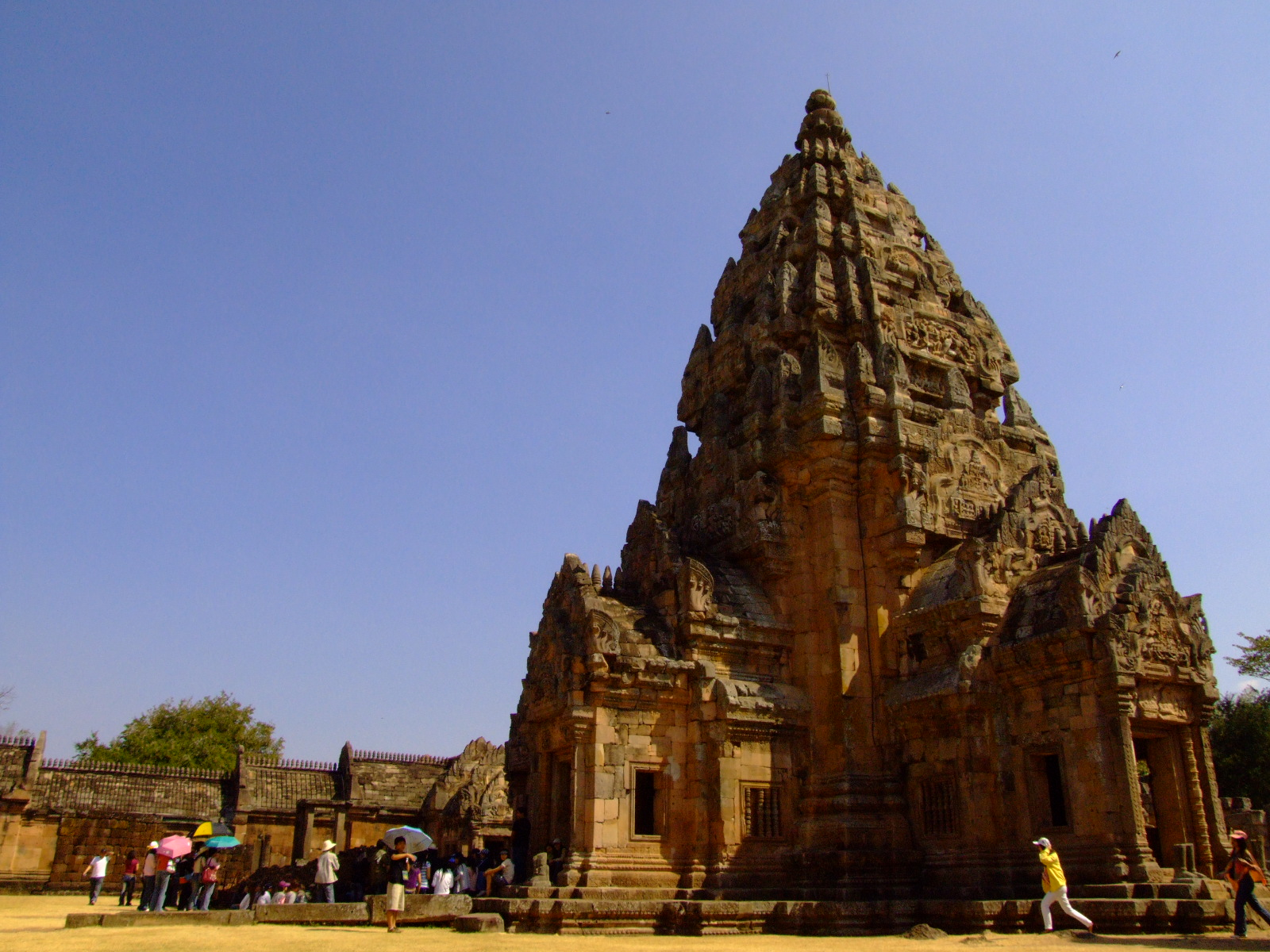
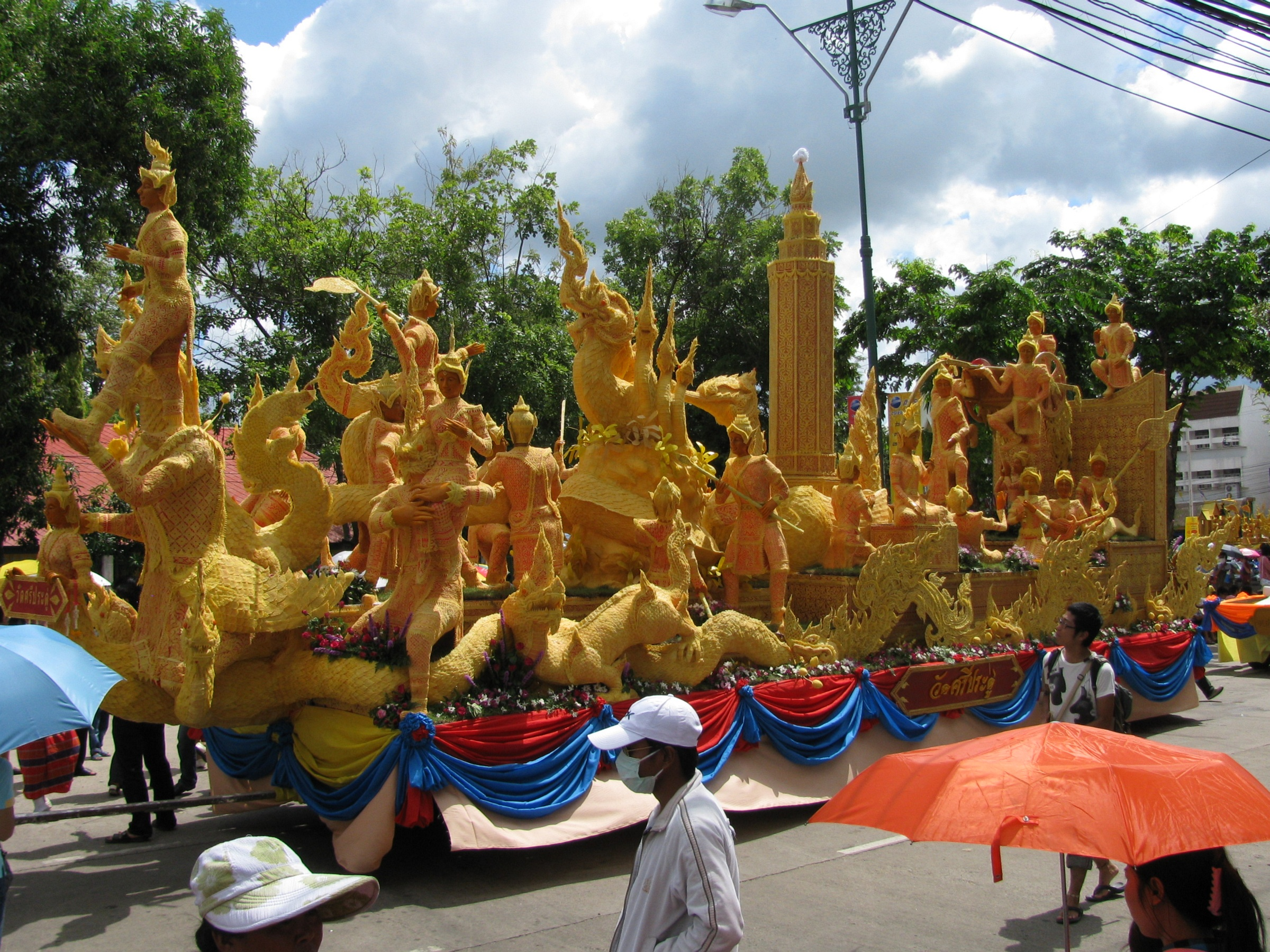
- From upper-left to lower-right: First Thai–Lao Friendship Bridge, Phu Kradueng, Khao Yai, Phanom Rung Historical Park and Candle Festival

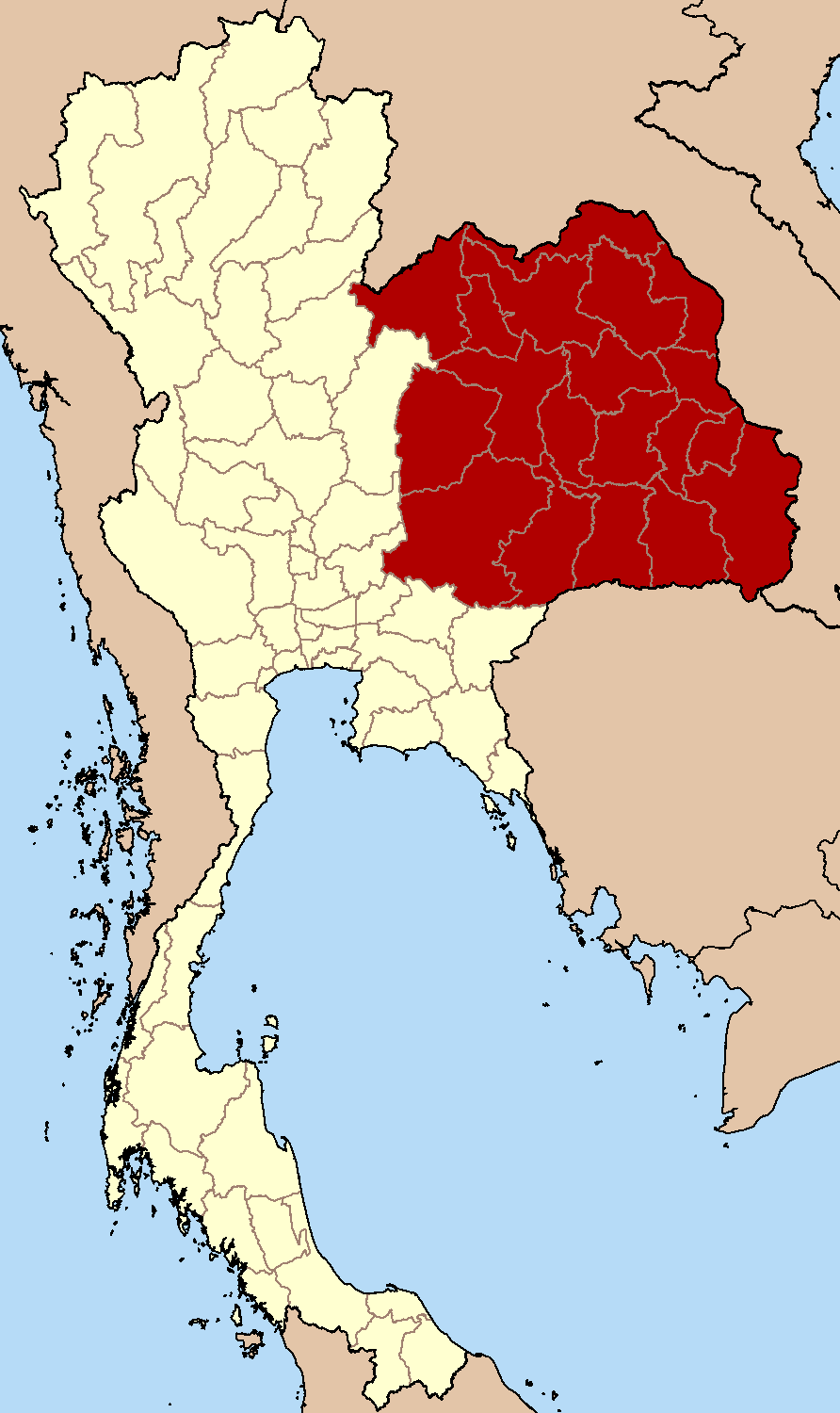
- Northeastern Region in Thailand
- Largest city: Nakhon Ratchasima
- Provinces: 20 provinces: Kalasin province; Khon Kaen province; Chaiyaphum province; Nakhon Phanom province; Nakhon Ratchasima province; Bueng Kan province; Buriram province; Maha Sarakham province; Mukdahan province; Roi Et province; Yasothon province; Loei province; Sisaket province; Sakon Nakhon province; Surin province; Nong Khai province; Nongbua Lamphu province; Amnat Charoen province; Udon Thani province; Ubon Ratchathani province

Area
  - Total: 167,718 km^{2} (64,756 sq mi)

Population (2019)
  - Total: 22,017,248
  - Density: 131.275/km^{2} (340.002/sq mi)
- Demonym: Khon Isan

GDP (Nominal, 2024)
  - Metro: ฿1.888 trillion (US$53.619 billion)
  - Per capita: ฿104,122 (US$2,957)
- Time zone: UTC+7 (ICT)
- Language: Isan • others

Northeast Thailand or Isan (Isan/Thai: อีสาน, pronounced [ʔīː.sǎːn]; Lao: ອີສານ, romanized: Īsān; also written as Isaan, Isarn, Issarn, Issan, Esan, or Esarn; from Pāli 𑀇𑀲𑀸𑀦 isāna or Sanskrit ईशान्य īśānya "northeast") consists of 20 provinces in northeastern Thailand. Isan is Thailand's largest region, on the Khorat Plateau, bordered by the Mekong River (along the Laos–Thailand border) to the north and east, by Cambodia to the southeast and the Sankamphaeng Range south of Nakhon Ratchasima. To the west, it is separated from northern and central Thailand by the Phetchabun Mountains. Isan covers 167,718 km^{2} (64,756 sq mi). The total forest area is 25,203 km^{2} (9,731 sq mi) or 15 percent of Isan's area.

Since the beginning of the 20th century, northeastern Thailand has been generally known as Isan, while in official contexts the term phak tawan-ok-chiang-nuea (ภาคตะวันออกเฉียงเหนือ; "northeastern region") may be used. The majority population of the Isan region is ethnically Lao, but distinguish themselves not only from the Lao of Laos but also from the Central Thai by calling themselves khon Isan or Thai Isan in general. But some refer to themselves as simply Lao, and academics have recently been referring to them as Lao Isan or as Thai Lao, with the main issue with self-identification as Lao being stigma associated with the Lao identity in Thai society.

The Lao Isan people are aware of their Lao ethnic origin, but Isan has been incorporated as a territory into the modern Thai state through over 100 years of administrative and bureaucratic reforms, educational policy, and government media. Despite this, since the election of Thaksin Shinawatra as prime minister in the 2001 Thai general election, the Lao Isan identity has reemerged, and the Lao Isan are now the main ethnolinguistic group involved in the pro-Thaksin "Red Shirt movement" of the United Front for Democracy Against Dictatorship. Several Thai prime ministers have come from the region.

== History ==
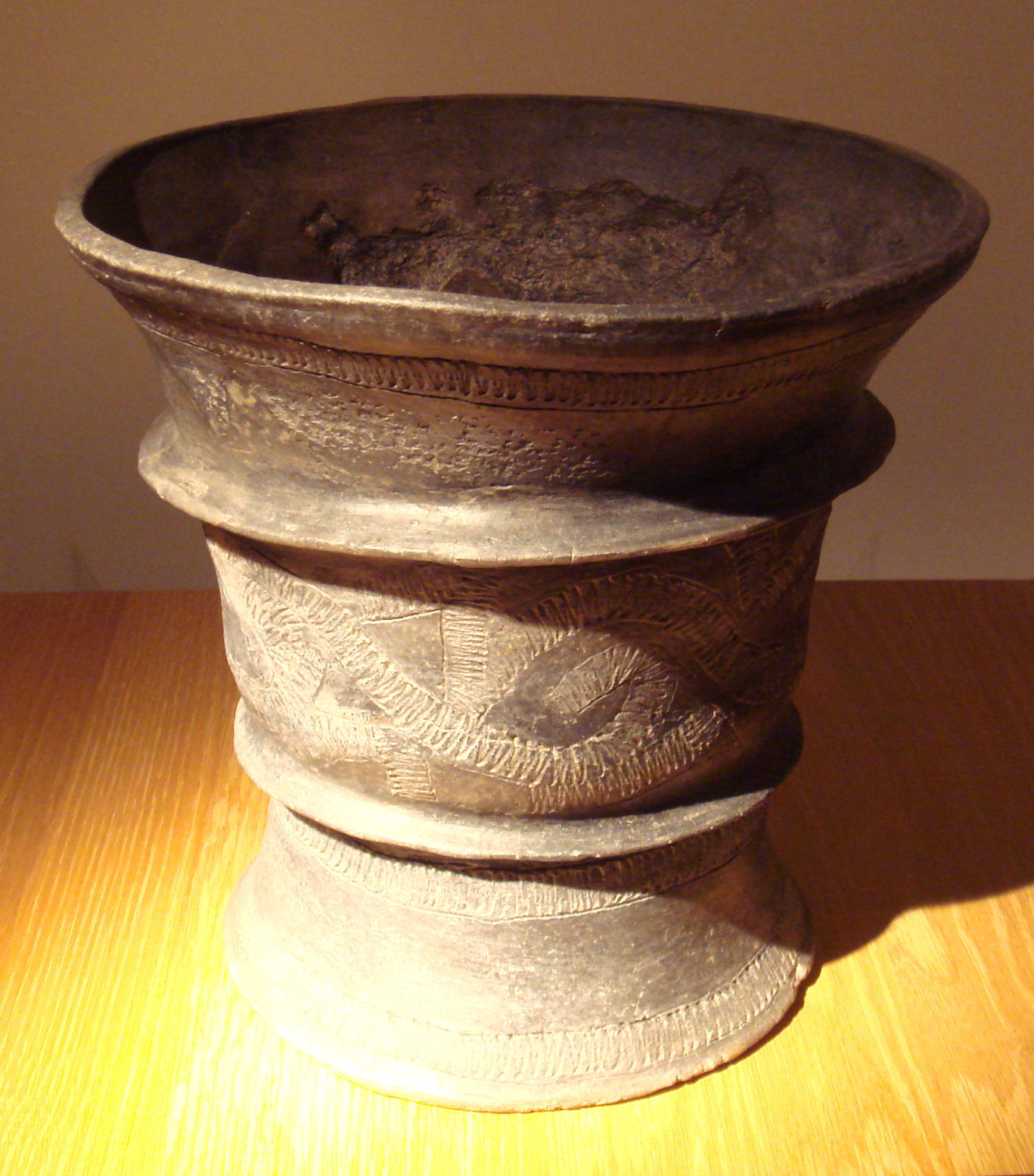
Black ceramic jar, Ban Chiang culture, Thailand, 1200-800 BCE.

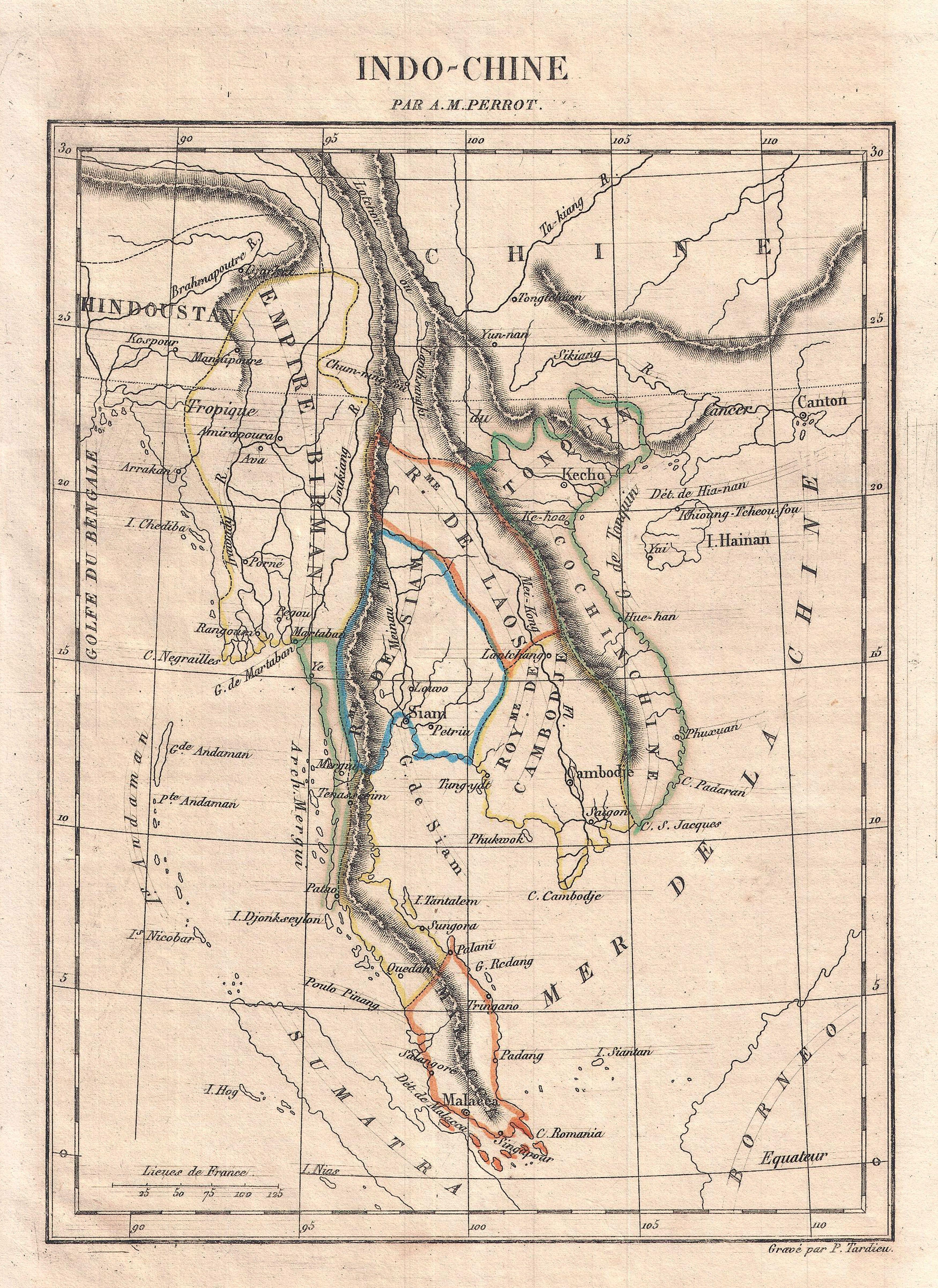
19th century map showing Isan region situated between Thailand, Laos and Cambodia

Isan has a number of important Bronze Age sites, with prehistoric art in the form of cliff paintings, artifacts and early evidence of rice cultivation. Iron and bronze tools such as those found at Ban Chiang may predate similar tools from Mesopotamia.

The region later came under the influence of the Dvaravati culture, followed by the Khmer Empire. The latter built dozens of prasats (sanctuaries) throughout Isan. The most significant are at Phimai Historical Park and Phanom Rung Historical Park. Preah Vihear was also considered to be in Isan, until the International Court of Justice in 1962 ruled that it belonged to Cambodia.

After the Khmer Empire began to decline in the 13th century, Isan was dominated by the Lao kingdom of Lan Xang, which had been established by Fa Ngum. Due to a scarcity of information from the periods known as the post-Angkor period, the plateau seems to have been largely depopulated. There were few if any lines of demarcation, because until the 19th-century introduction of modern mapping, the region fell under what 20th-century scholars called the "mandala system". Accordingly, in 1718 the first Lao mueang in the Chi River valley—and indeed anywhere in the interior of the Khorat Plateau—was founded at Suwannaphum District (in present-day Roi Et Province) by an official in the service of King Nokasad of the Kingdom of Champasak.

=== Thaification ===
The region was increasingly settled by both Lao and Thai emigrants. Thailand held sway from the 17th century, and carried out forced population transfers from the more populous left (east) bank of the Mekong to the right bank in the 18th and 19th centuries. This custom of forced population transfers was endemic in pre-modern Mainland Southeast Asian warfare. This became more severe following the Lao rebellion (1826–1828), during which Anouvong, the last of the kings of Vientiane, rebelled against Siamese suzerainty, and lost a war that lasted two years. Khorat was then repopulated by forced migration of Mekong Valley Lao, with a heavy influx of voluntary Chinese migrants. In the wake of the Franco-Siamese crisis of 1893, the resulting treaty with France and the Anglo-Siamese Treaty of 1909 made the plateau a border region between Thailand and the Laos of French Indochina. Roi Et was established early in the 20th century to further Siamese control, and to further assimilation of the population into the kingdom.

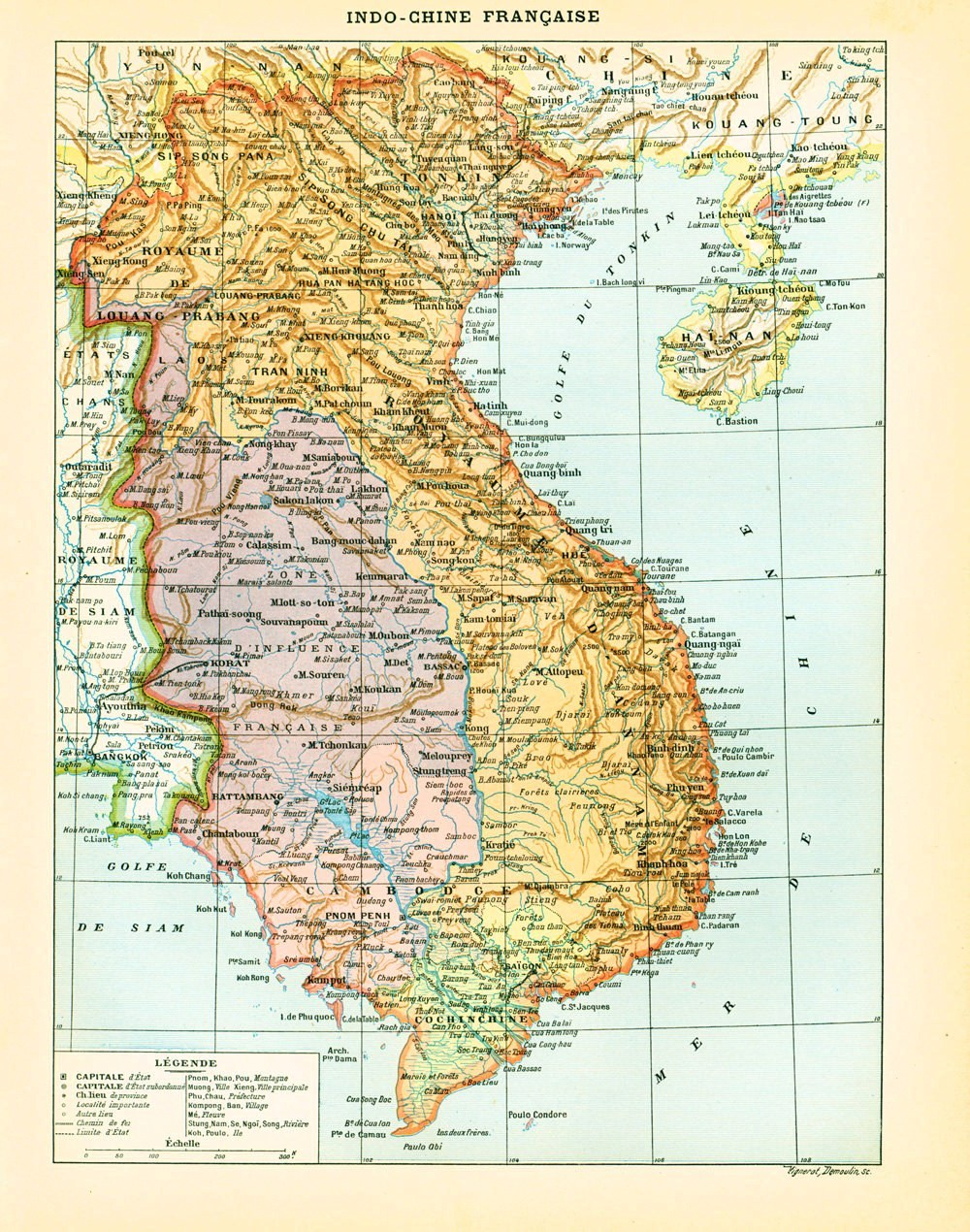
Isan under the French zone of influence.

In the mid-20th century, the state-supported assimilation policy called Thaification promoted Isan's ethnic integration into the modern conception of Thai nationality and de-emphasized the use of ethnic markers, for ethnic Laos and Khmers, as it was deemed uncivilized and to prevent ethnic discrimination among the Thai people.

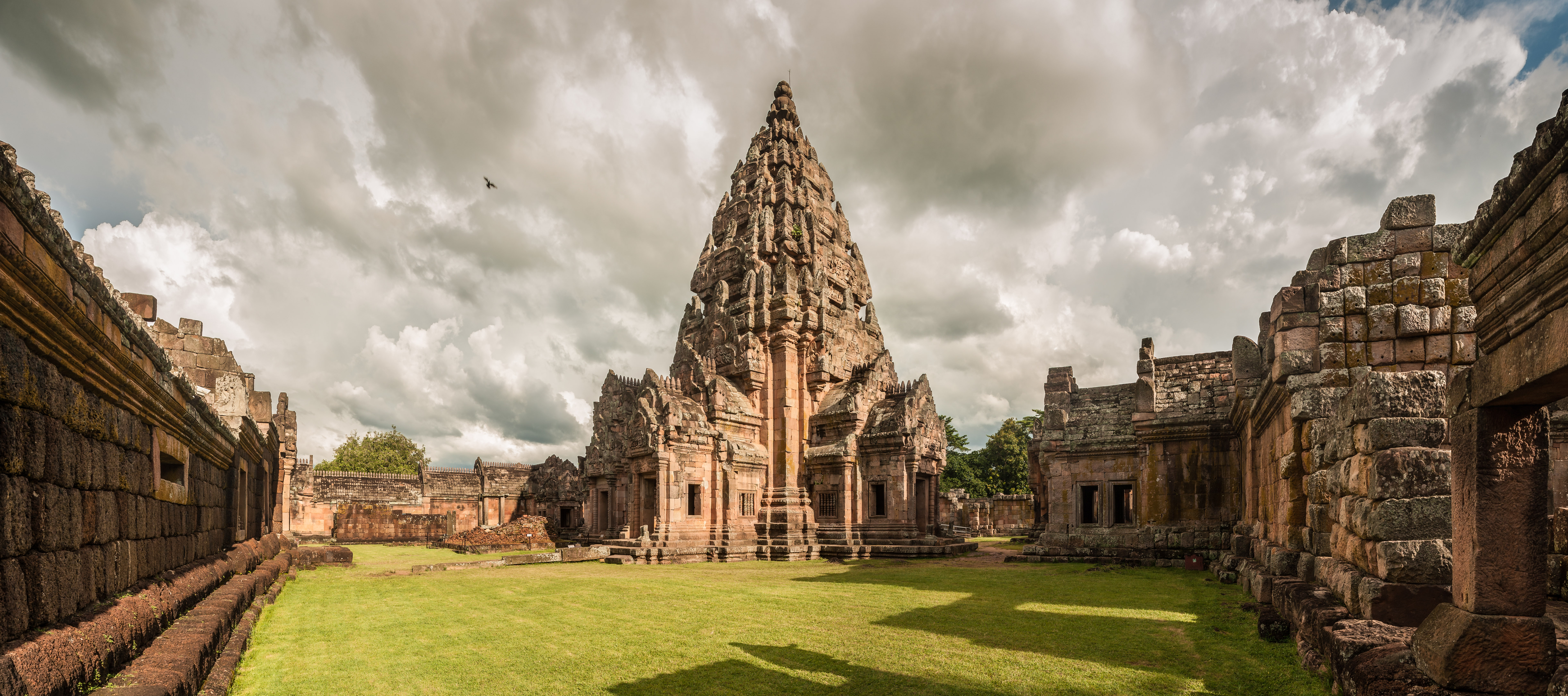
Phanom Rung in Buriram.

This policy extended to the use of the name "Isan" itself: the name is derived from the Pali word īsāna, meaning "northeast", in turn from the name of Iśāna (Sanskrit: ईशान), a manifestation of Shiva as deity of the northeast. The name therefore reinforces the area's identity as northeastern Thailand, rather than as a part of the Lao kingdom, which had recently been created by the French colonial discourse, as "race was then an important ideological tool for French colonialists in the attempt to seize the 'Laotian' and 'Cambodian' portions of Siam."

Before the central government introduced the Thai alphabet and language in regional schools, the people of Isan wrote in the Tai Noi script, which is very similar to the one that Thai adopted. Many people speak Isan, a variety of Lao, as their first language. A significant minority in the south also speak Northern Khmer.

The Kuy people, an Austroasiatic people concentrated around the core of what was once called "Chenla" and known as the Khmer Boran ("ancient Khmer"), are a link to the region's pre-Tai history.

== Geography ==
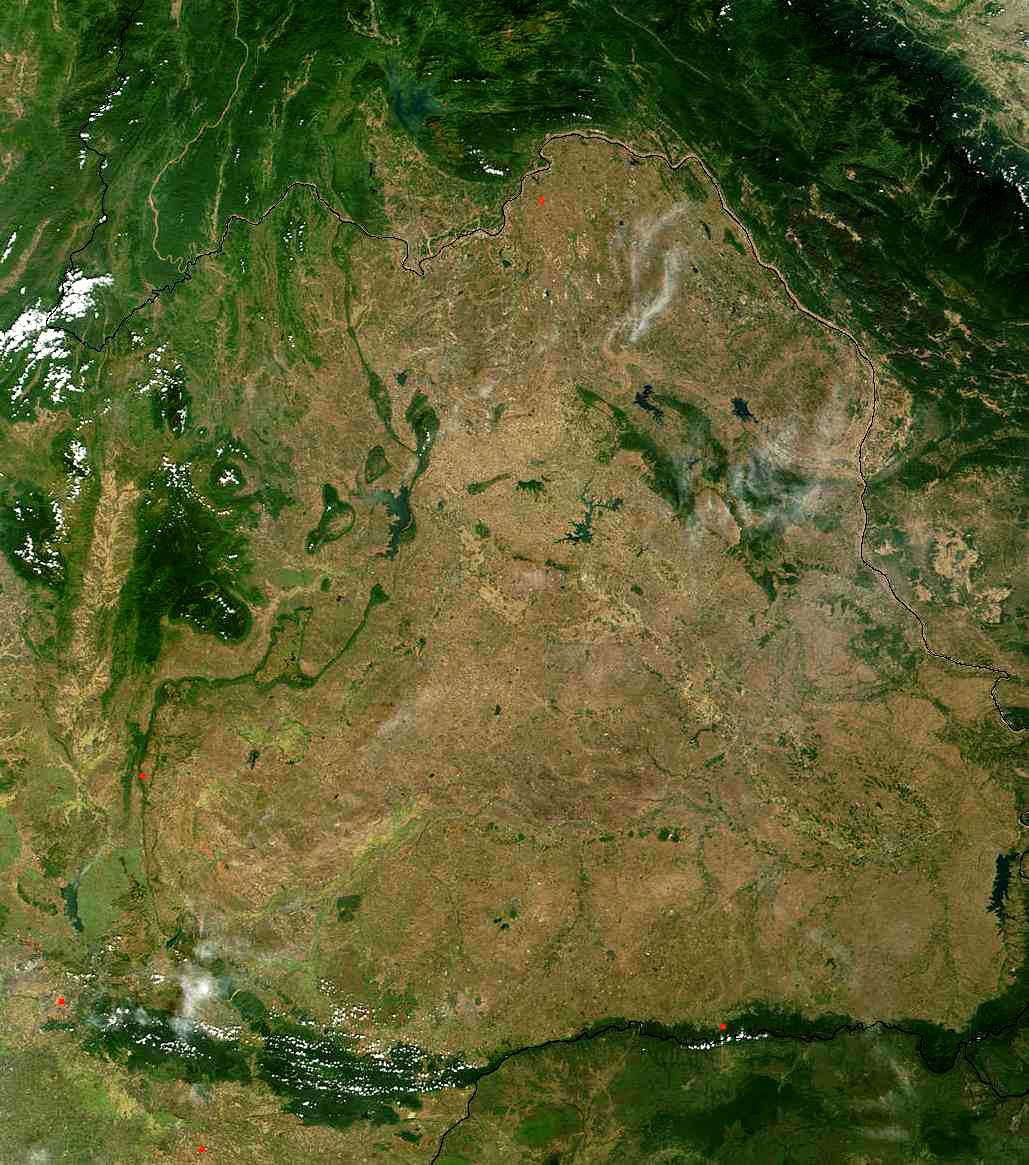
Satellite image of Isan: the borders with Laos and Cambodia can be seen due to the greater deforestation within Isan.

Isan is roughly coterminous with the Khorat Plateau, which tilts gently from its northwestern corner, where it is about 213 m (699 ft) above sea level, to the southeast, where the elevation is only about 62 metres (203 ft). Except for a few hills in the northeastern corner, the region is primarily gently undulating land, most of it varying in elevation from 90 to 180 m (300 to 590 ft), tilting from the Phetchabun Mountains in the west down to the Mekong River. The plateau consists of two plains: the southern Khorat plain is drained by the Mun and Chi rivers, while the northern Sakon Nakhon plain is drained by the Loei and Songkhram rivers. The two plains are separated by the Phu Phan Mountains. The soil is mostly sandy, with substantial salt deposits.

Cities, mountains, and rivers of Isan

The Mekong forms most of the border between Thailand and Laos to the north and east of Isan, while the south of the region borders Cambodia. The Mekong's main Thai tributary is the Mun River, which rises in the Khao Yai National Park near Nakhon Ratchasima Province and runs east, joining the Mekong in Ubon Ratchathani Province. Isan's other main river is the Chi, which flows through central Isan before turning south to meet the Mun in Sisaket Province. The smaller Loei and Songkhram rivers are also tributaries of the Mekong, the former flowing north through Loei Province and the latter east through Udon Thani, Sakon Nakhon, Nakhon Phanom, and Nong Khai Provinces.

The average temperature range is from 30.2 to 19.6 °C (86.4 to 67.3 °F). The highest temperature recorded was 43.9 °C (111.0 °F) in Udon Thani, the lowest −1.4 °C (29.5 °F) at Sakhon Nakhon Agro Station.

Rainfall is unpredictable, but is concentrated in the rainy season from May to October. Average annual precipitation varies from 2,000 mm (79 in) in some areas to 1,270 mm (50 in) in the southwestern provinces of Nakhon Ratchasima, Buriram, Maha Sarakham, Khon Kaen, and Chaiyaphum. The rainy season begins with occasional short but heavy showers, eventually raining heavily for longer periods almost every day, usually in the late afternoon or at night, until it ends abruptly at the onset of the cool season.

The cool season runs from October to February and the hot season from February to May with the peak of high temperatures in April.

=== National parks ===
Isan has around 26 national parks. Province Khon Kaen has four national parks, of which Phu Pha Man National Park is notable for its large daily exodus of bats at dusk, making a formation about 10 kilometers (6.2 miles) long. Siam tulip fields are in Sai Thong National Park and Pa Hin Ngam National Park, both in Chaiyaphum Province. Phu Phan National Park in Sakon Nakhon Province includes the eight meters (26 ft) long Tang Pee Parn natural stone bridge. Among Thailand's best-known national parks are Khao Yai National Park in Nakhon Ratchasima Province and Phu Kradueng National Park in Loei Province.

=== Biodiversity ===
Isan has high biodiversity and many endemic species. Both wildlife and plant species are exploited illegally. Valuable hardwood tree species, in particular Siamese Rosewood, are being extracted for sale, especially in the Chinese furniture market. These trees are so valuable that poachers, coming across the border from Cambodia, are heavily armed, and both rangers and poachers have been killed over them. In national parks such as Ta Phraya, rangers have been trained since 2015 in military-style counter-poaching measures by the elite ranger squad Hasadin.

== Economy ==
Isan is home to one-third of Thailand's population of 67 million, but contributes only ten per cent to the national GDP.

In terms of regional value-added per capita, Isan is Thailand's poorest region. Bangkok is the richest, followed by central Thailand, southern Thailand, then northern Thailand. This ordering has been unchanged for decades. Thailand's highly centralized fiscal system reinforces the status quo. An example of this Bangkok-centric policy is the allocation of budgets: Bangkok accounts for about 17 percent of the population and 25.8 percent of GDP, but benefits from about 72.2 percent of total expenditures. Isan accounts for about 34 percent of the population and 11.5 percent of GDP, but receives only 5.8 percent of expenditures.

Agriculture is the largest sector of the economy, generating around 22 percent of the gross regional product (compared to 8.5 percent for Thailand as a whole). Sticky rice, the staple food of the region, is the main agricultural crop (accounting for about 60 percent of cultivated land). It thrives in poorly drained paddy fields, and where fields can be flooded from nearby streams, rivers, and ponds. Often two harvests are possible each year. Farmers are increasingly diversifying into cash crops such as sugarcane and cassava, which are cultivated on a vast scale, and to a lesser extent, rubber. Silk production is an important cottage industry and contributes significantly to the economy.

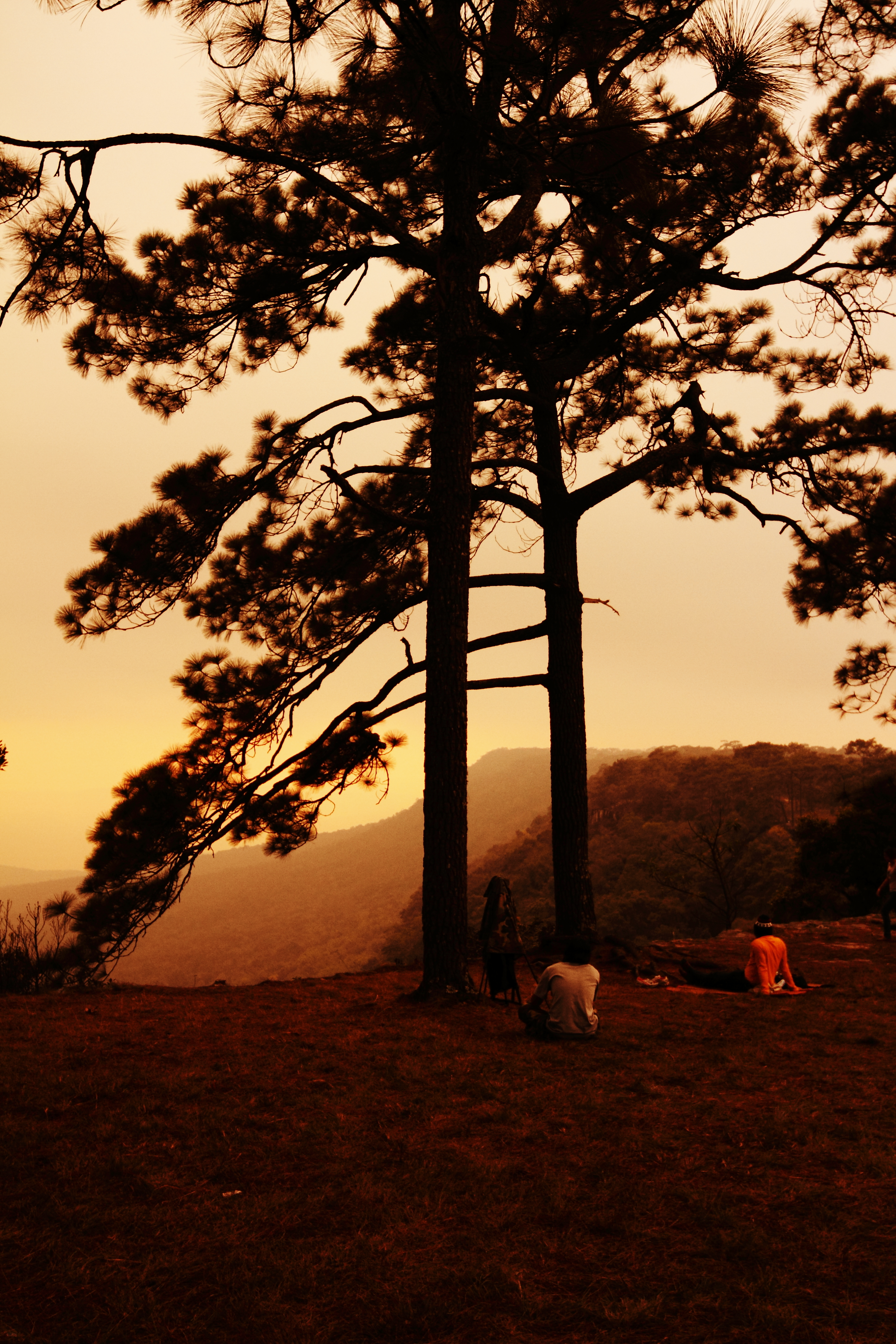
Phu Kra Dung is a well-known tourist destination in Isan.

Nong Khai Province, which stretches along the Mekong River, is noted for the production of pineapples, tobacco (which is dried, cured and shredded by the families before collection by cigarette manufacturers), and tomatoes, which are grown on an industrial scale, particularly in Si Chiang Mai District.

Despite its dominance of the economy, agriculture in the region is problematic. The climate is prone to drought, while the flat terrain of the plateau often floods in the rainy season. The tendency to flood renders a large proportion of the land unsuitable for cultivation. In addition, the soil is highly acidic, saline, and infertile from overuse. Since the 1970s, agriculture has been declining in importance as trade and the service sector have been increasing.

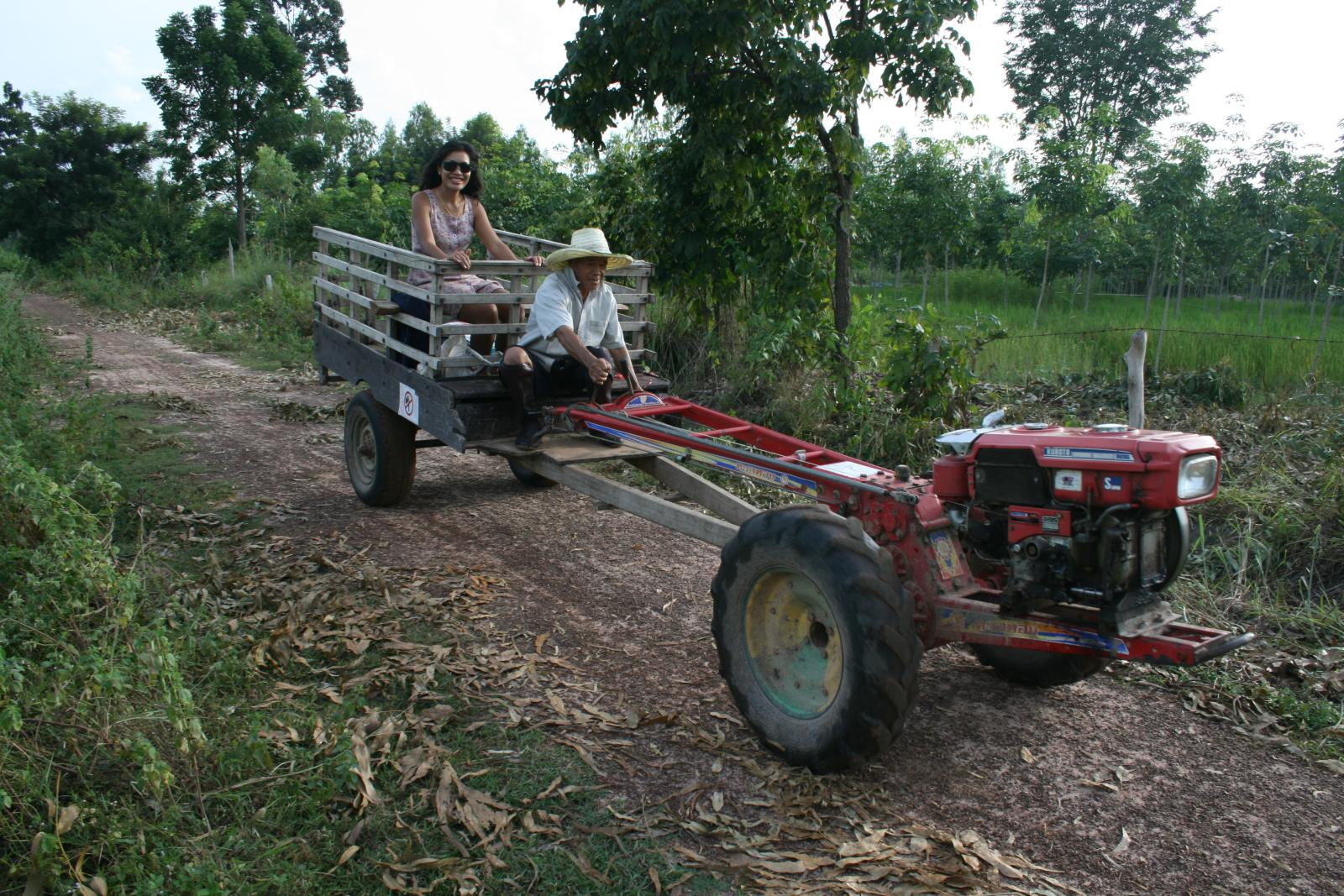
Kubota two-wheel tractor and cart in Ubon Ratchathani province

Very few farmers still use water buffalos rather than tractors. Nowadays, water buffalos are mainly kept by almost all rural families as status symbols. The main piece of agricultural equipment in use today is the "rot thai na" (Thai: รถไถนา, lit. "vehicle plow field"), colloquially called "khwai lek" (Thai: ควายเหล็ก, or "iron/steel buffalo"), or more generally by its manufacturer's name of "Kubota", a mini-tractor composed of a small diesel engine mounted on two wheels with long wooden or metal handlebars for steering. It is usually attached to a trailer or a plow. Buffalo are now mainly used for grazing on the stubble in the rice paddy, which they in turn fertilize with their manure. The main animals raised for food are cattle, pigs, chickens, ducks, and fish.

Most of Thailand's rural poor live in Isan. The region's poverty is reflected in its infrastructure: eight of the ten provinces in Thailand with the fewest physicians per capita are in Isan. Sisaket Province has the fewest, with one physician per 14,661 persons in 2001, with the national average being 3,289. It also has eight of the ten provinces with the fewest hospital beds per head. Chaiyaphum Province has the fewest, with one per 1,131 in 2001 (the national average was 453). Nevertheless, as in the rest of Thailand, all districts (amphoe) have a hospital, and all sub-districts (tambon) have clinics providing primary health care. The introduction of the "30 baht" health card has dramatically changed the numbers of those attending hospitals for treatment, as it has meant that full health care is available to all who register for only 30 baht per visit. The few who can afford it travel to the modern private hospitals and clinics in the large cities for non-urgent specialist consultations and care.

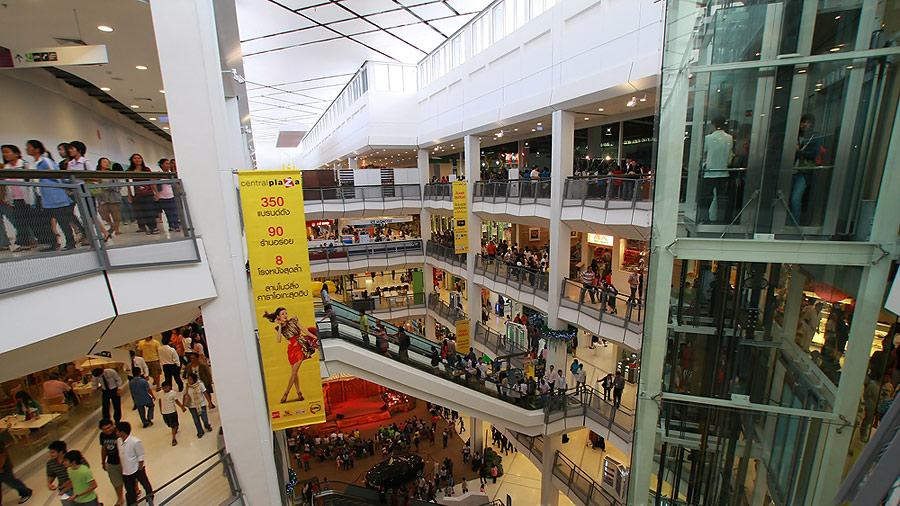
Central Plaza, Khon Kaen

The region lags in new technology: there was only one Internet connection per 75 households in 2002 (national average: one per 22 households) [update needed], but by 2006 every district town (amphoe) had at least one publicly accessible Internet connection, either in a local computer shop or in the district office.

Extension of landline telephones to remote areas not previously served has been largely superseded by the use of mobile phones, primarily of GSM format, which now covers the entire region with the exception of a few sparsely populated mountainous areas and large national parks. Many people, even the poorest and frequently also children, have cellular telephones, although they have no fixed-line telephone. In this sense, Isan has led advanced nations where landline service is now being superseded by cellular technology. The region also has the nation's lowest literacy rate.

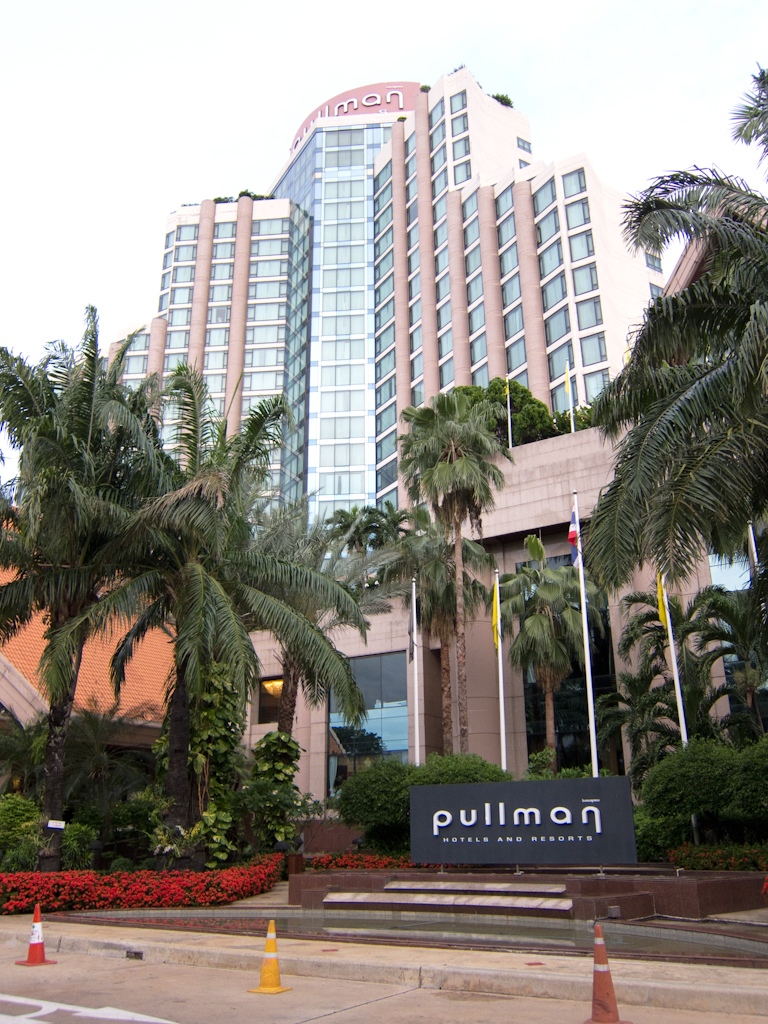
Pullman Khon Kaen Raja Orchid

By the beginning of 2008, most amphoe had been provided with ADSL by the TOT, leaving the majority of the rural population dependent on dial-up connections for those few who have landline telephones. This results in slow service that does not adequately meet modern needs. Most rural people rely on smartphones for data services. Internet shops with high-speed connections have for many years provided service to those who cannot afford or do not have access to high-speed Internet. They are heavily patronized by primary and secondary school children who come not only to use the Internet but also to play online games, use VOIP, or just to use the computer and printers. Resident Western expatriates and foreign tourists are also frequent customers. For those outside the district towns who require a serious use of the Internet in their homes, the mobile phone or an iPstar broadband satellite connection is the only alternative, although more expensive than a DSL connection. It is far less reliable and suffers considerable downtime due to overloading, heavy cloud cover, and rain. Despite, in theory, being "always on", it often lacks adequate stability for streaming and clarity of VOIP.

Many Isan people seek higher-paying work outside the region, particularly in Bangkok. Some of these people have settled permanently in the city, while some migrate to and fro. Others have emigrated in search of better wages. Rather than relocate as a family, they often leave their children in the care of relatives, friends, or neighbors.

Average wages in Isan were the lowest in the country in 2002 at 3,928 baht per month (the national average was 6,445 baht).

A Khon Kaen University study (2014) found that marriages with foreigners by Thai northeastern women boosted the gross domestic product of the northeast by 8.67 billion baht (2014: €211 million or US$270 million). According to the study, after a northeastern woman married a foreigner, she will send 9,600 baht a month on average to her family to help with its expenses. The activity also created 747,094 jobs, the study found. The 2010 census found that 90 percent of the slightly more than 27,000 foreigners living in the northeastern region were married to women from there.

=== Tourism ===
According to the governor of Nakhon Phanom Province, "The entire Northeast [Isan] gained only 2.9 percent of [the] country's tourism income of 2.7 trillion baht [in 2017]."

== Demographics ==
=== Population ===
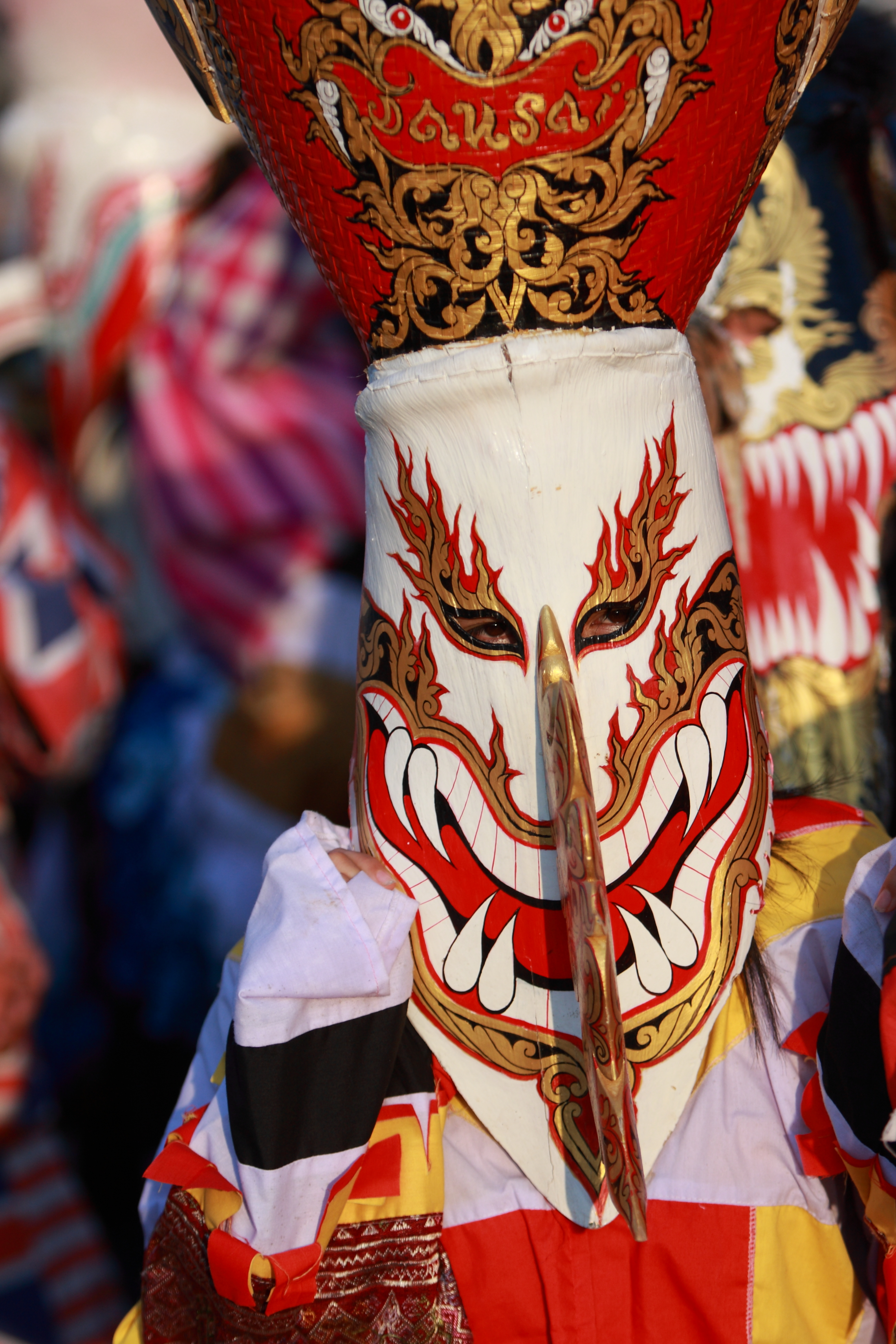
Phi Ta Khon mask festival in Loei

Isan's total population as of 2025 was 22 million. Forty percent of the population is concentrated in the provinces of Khorat, Ubon Ratchathani, Udon Thani, and Khon Kaen, known as "big four of Isan". These provinces surround the four major cities of the same names. As of 2025, their populations were: Khorat 126,391; Udon Thani 130,531; Khon Kaen 114,459; and Ubon Ratchathani 122,070. As of 2025, 50 percent of the region's population lived in municipal areas. Kalasin was the most urbanized province (with almost 100 percent in municipal areas), and Roi Et the least (2.8 percent). Thus, the population is still largely rural, but concentrated around the urban centers.

There is a substantial Khmer minority, concentrated in the southern provinces of Buriram, Surin, and Sisaket, and some Vietnamese refugees in Mukdahan and Nakhon Phanom. The Khmer-speaking minority and the Kuy people ("Soui"), who live in the south of Isan, speak Austroasiatic languages and follow customs more similar to those of Cambodia than to those of the Thai and Lao, who are Tai peoples.

Ethnic groups of Northeastern Thailand by Language Family
Language family	Ethnic group	Persons
Tai	Lao Isan / Thai Lao	13,000,000
Tai	Teochew / Central Thai	800,000
Tai	Thai Khorat / Tai Beung / Tai Deung	600,000
Tai	Thai-Loei	500,000
Tai	Phu Thai	500,000
Tai	Nyaw	500,000
Tai	Kaleung	200,000
Tai	Yoy	200,000
Tai	Phuan	200,000
Tai	Tai-Dam (Song)	(not specified)
Tai	Total	16,103,000
Austroasiatic	Thailand Khmer / Northern Khmer	1,400,000
Austroasiatic	Kuy / Kuay	400,000
Austroasiatic	So	70,000
Austroasiatic	Bru	70,000
Austroasiatic	Vietnamese	20,000
Austroasiatic	Nyeu	10,000
Austroasiatic	Nyah Kur / Chao Bon / Khon Dong	7,000
Austroasiatic	Aheu people	1,500
Austroasiatic	Mon	1,000
Austroasiatic	Total	1,909,000
Cannot identify ethnicity and amount		3,288,000
Total	Total	21,300,000

=== Languages ===
The main language is Isan, the name by which the Lao language is called in Thailand for political reasons, though most people in the Isan region still call it Lao among themselves and in non-official settings, but dialect from Khon Kaen is de facto standard. The number of Isan speakers has been estimated at between 15 and 23 million, with the majority living in Isan. Written with the Thai alphabet (instead of the historically used Tai Noi script), Isan belongs to the Chiang Saeng and Lao–Phutai language groups, which along with Thai are members of the Tai languages of the Kra–Dai language family.

There are two varieties of Central Thai in Isan, Khorat Thai is archaic Central Thai dialect with heavy Khmer and some Lao influence, natively spoken by one-fourth of the population in Nakhon Ratchasima Province, and Krungthep accent, language of Teochews settlers, prevalence in Mueang Khonkaen, Mueang Udonthani, Mueang Buriram and Nangrong, the accent is the same accent in Eastern Economic Corridor, Southern Thailand and definitely Thai Chinese in Bangkok. Due Krungthep dialect is a national language, and because of Teochew settlers preferred to blend into Isan culture, and most of them are mastery in Khonkaen dialect (Standard Isan), there has never been a survey on the number of Krungthep accent native speakers. Due political reason, government and Royal Society treat the topolects as dialect, the varieties of Central Thai itself are marginalized and treated as if it doesn't exist, thus both dialects consider as official language, and almost all in Isan are mastery in Central Thai at the level of native speakers.

Most of the "tribal" Tai languages, so called because of their origins in mountainous areas of Laos or their adherence to animism, are closely related to Isan, and all but Tai Yam are generally mutually intelligible. Even in areas with a heavy linguistic minority presence, native Isan speakers of Lao descent comprised anywhere from 60 to 74 per cent of the population, although minority language speakers are also bi- or trilingual in Isan, Thai or both.

Isan is home to many speakers of Austroasiatic languages, with one and one-half million speakers of the Northern Khmer dialect and one-half million speakers of the Kuy language, both of which are found in Isan's southernmost provinces. Khmer is widely spoken in Buriram, Surin, and Sisaket, along the Cambodian border. Several small ethnic groups speak various other Austroasiatic languages, but most are fairly small and restricted to a few villages, or, like Vietnamese, spoken by small groups in cities.

Other languages spoken in Isan, mainly by tribal minorities, are:

Minority languages spoken in Isan
Language family	Language		Speakers	Distribution
Austroasiatic	Khmer, Northern		1,400,000	Buriram, Sisaket, Surin, Roi Et, Nakhon Ratchasima
Austroasiatic	Kuy		400,000	Surin, Sisaket, Buriram
Austroasiatic	Vietnamese		20,000	Spoken by small groups in most major cities
Austroasiatic	Bru, Western		20,000	Mukdahan
Austroasiatic	Nyah Kur/Mon		8,000	Nakhon Ratchasima, Chayaphum
Austroasiatic	Bru, Eastern		5,000	Sakhon Nakhon, Amnat Charoen
Austroasiatic	Aheu		740	Sakhon Nakhon
Austroasiatic	Mlabri		300	Loei
Kra-Dai	Central Thai	Khorat dialect	500,000	Nakhon Ratchasima, Buriram, Chaiyaphum
Kra-Dai	Central Thai	Krung Thep dialect	100,000	First-language speakers among Teochews settlers, mostly in major cities, understood throughout Isan and common second or third language.
Kra-Dai	Phuthai		500,000	Mukdahan, Nakhon Phanom, Ubon Ratchathani, Kalasin and Sakon Nakhon
Kra-Dai	Tai Yo (Tai Gno)		500,000	Sakhon Nakhon, Nongkhai, Nakhon Phanom, Maha Sarakham
Kra-Dai	Tai Yoy (Tai Gnoi)		50,000	Sakhon Nakhon
Kra-Dai	Saek (Sèk)		~7,000	Nakhon Phanom
Sino-Tibetan	Chinese, Minnan		Unknown, dying	Mostly Teochew, also Hokkien and Hailam, spoken by oldest members of the Sino-Isan community.
Hmong-Mien	Hmong/Mong		Unknown	Loei

== Education ==
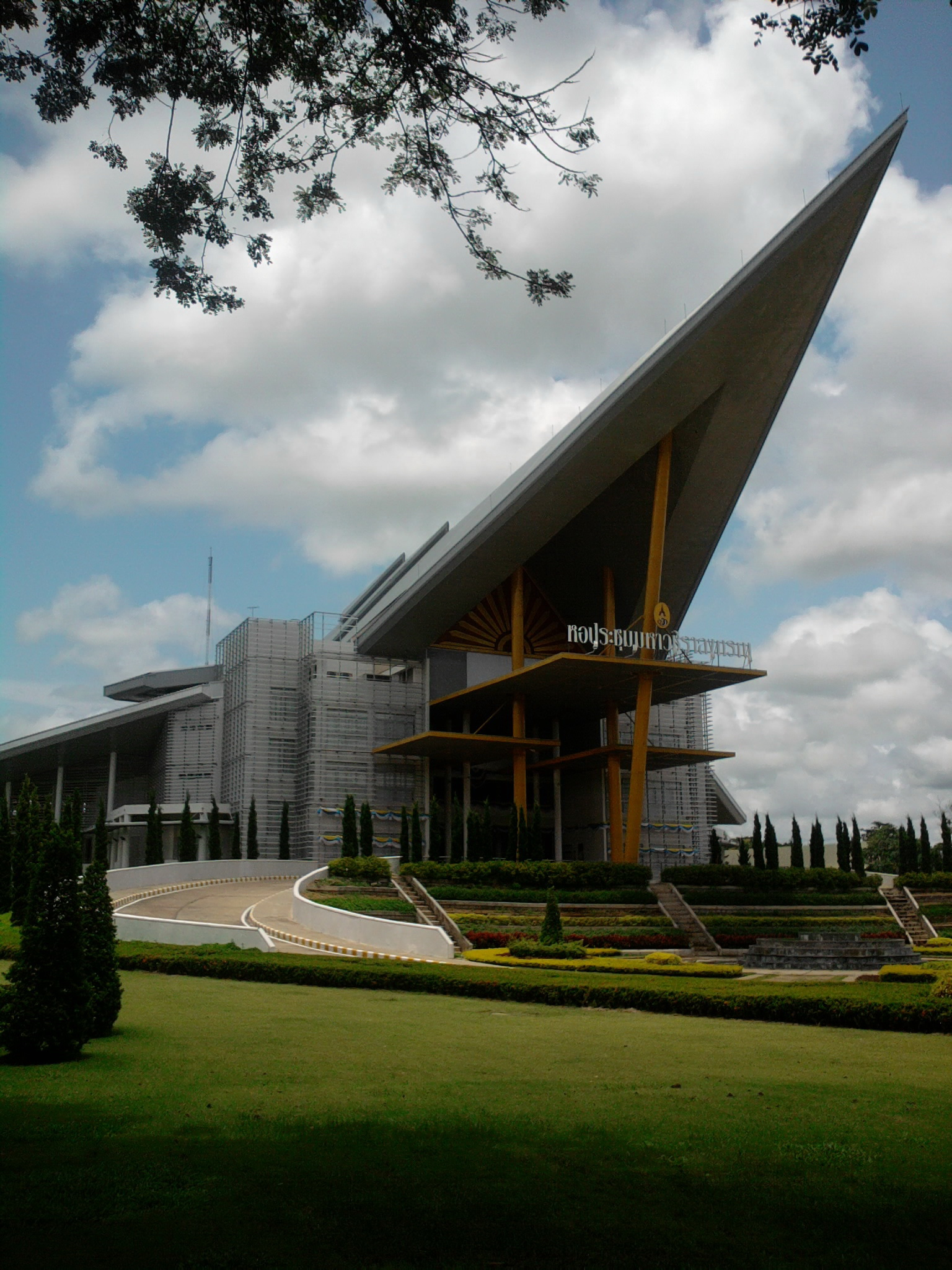
Sakhon Nakhon Rajabhat University

Education is well-provided for by the government in terms of numbers of establishments and is supplemented in the larger cities by the private sector (mostly Catholic and international schools). Following the national pattern of education in Thailand, there are primary (elementary) schools in all larger villages and (tambon) capitals, with secondary (high) schools to grade 12 (approximately age 18) in the district (amphoe) towns.

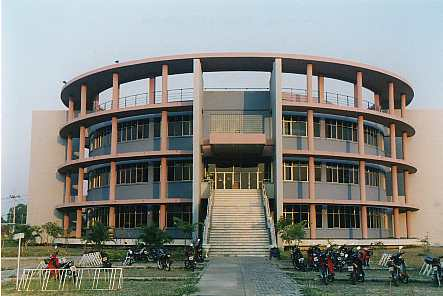
Library, Ubon Ratchathani University

Many other secondary schools provide education only to grade 9, while some combined schools provide education from grade 1 through grade 9. Rural schools are generally less well equipped than the schools in the large towns and cities and the standard of instruction, particularly for the English language, is much lower. Many children of poorer families leave school after grade 6 (age 12) to work on the farms. A number move to areas of dense or tourist populations to work in the service industry.

Many primary schools operate their own websites and almost all schoolchildren in Isan, at least from junior high school age, are now (2008) largely computer literate in basic programs.

In 2001, there were 43 government vocational and polytechnic colleges throughout the region, several specialised training colleges in the private sector, and large colleges of agriculture and nursing in Udon Thani Province.

Universities are found in the major cities of Khon Kaen (one of the country's largest), Nakhon Ratchasima, Ubon Ratchathani, and the smaller provincial capital of Maha Sarakham. Some Bangkok-based universities have small campuses in Isan, and Khon Kaen University maintains a large installation on the outskirts of Nong Khai. Most provinces have a government-run Rajabhat University, formerly known as Rajabhat Institutes, which originated as teacher training colleges.

== Culture ==
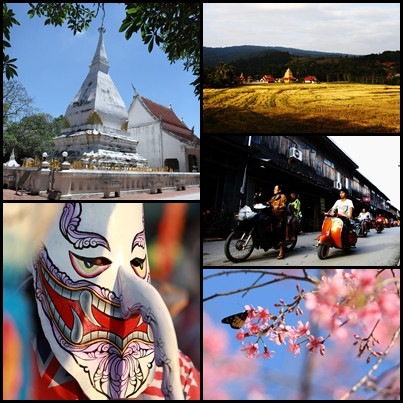
Loei Province

Isan's culture is predominantly Lao, and has much in common with that of neighboring Laos. This affinity is shown in the region's cuisine, dress, temple architecture, festivals, and arts.

Isan food has elements most in common with Laos and is somewhat distinct from central Thai cuisine. The most obvious difference is the consumption of sticky rice that accompanies almost every meal rather than non-sticky long-grain rice. French and Vietnamese influences found in Lao cuisine are absent in Isan. Popular Lao dishes that are also staples in Isan include tam buk hoong, (green papaya salad), (in Laotian Lao, the pronunciation is tam mak hoong, while in central Thai, it's som tam) larb (meat salad), and kai yang (grilled chicken). These dishes have spread to other parts of Thailand, but normally in versions that temper the extreme heat, sourness, and umami from fermented fish (pla daek, or pla rah in Central Thai) favored in Isan for the more moderate central Thai palate. Conversely, central Thai food has become popular in Isan. The people of Isan, a mixture of Lao, Vietnamese, Khmer, Mon, Cham, and other Tai groups, famously eat a wide variety of creatures, such as lizards, frogs, and fried insects, such as grasshoppers, crickets, silkworms, and dung beetles. Originally forced by poverty to be creative in finding foods, Isan people now savor these creatures as delicacies or snacks. Food is commonly eaten by hand using sticky rice pressed into a ball with the fingers of the right hand. Soups are a frequent element of any meal, and contain vegetables, herbs, noodles, chunks of fish, balls of ground pork, or a mixture of these. They are eaten using a spoon and chopsticks at the same time.

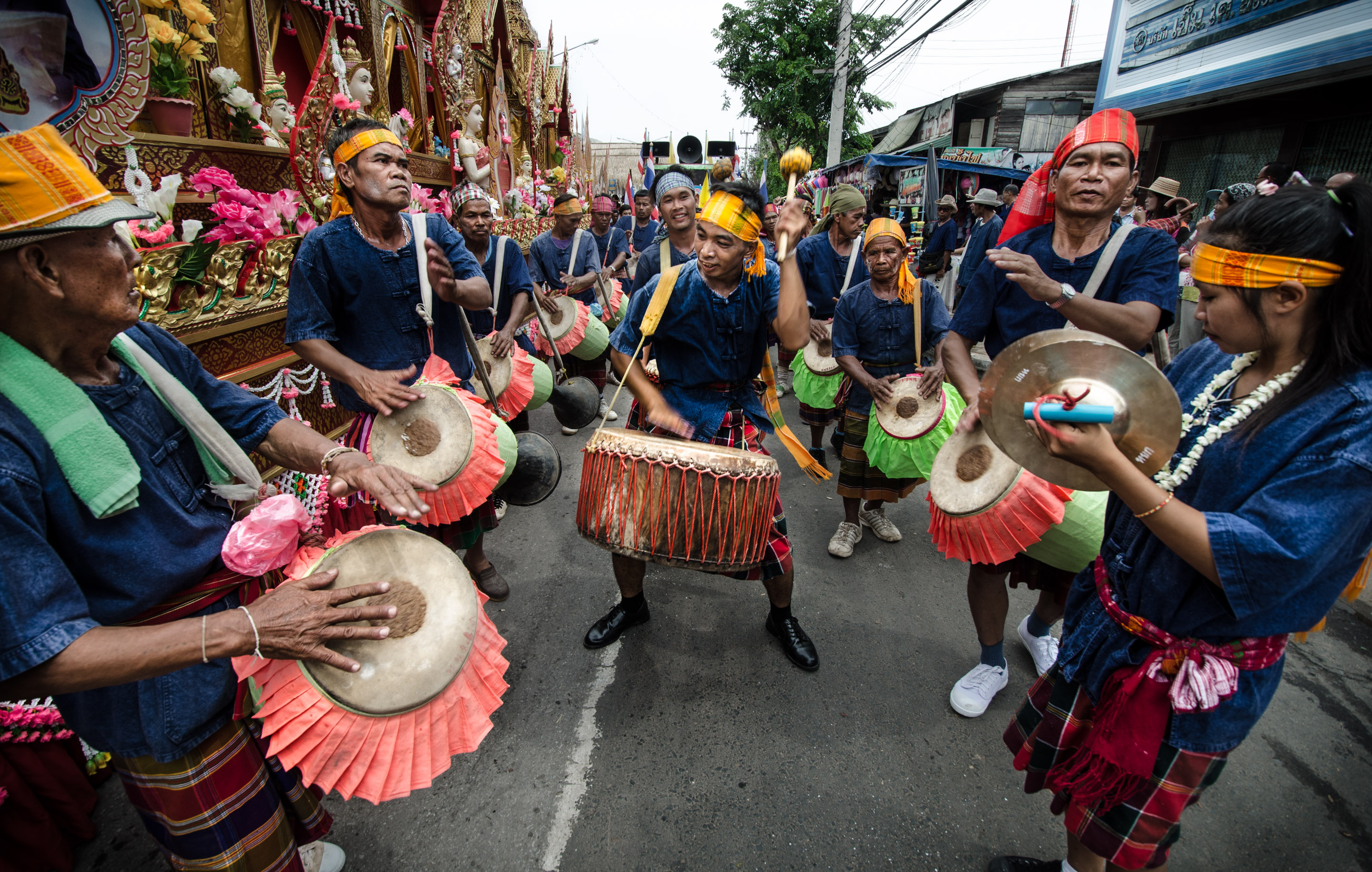
Traditional drums, Rocket Festival, Yasothon

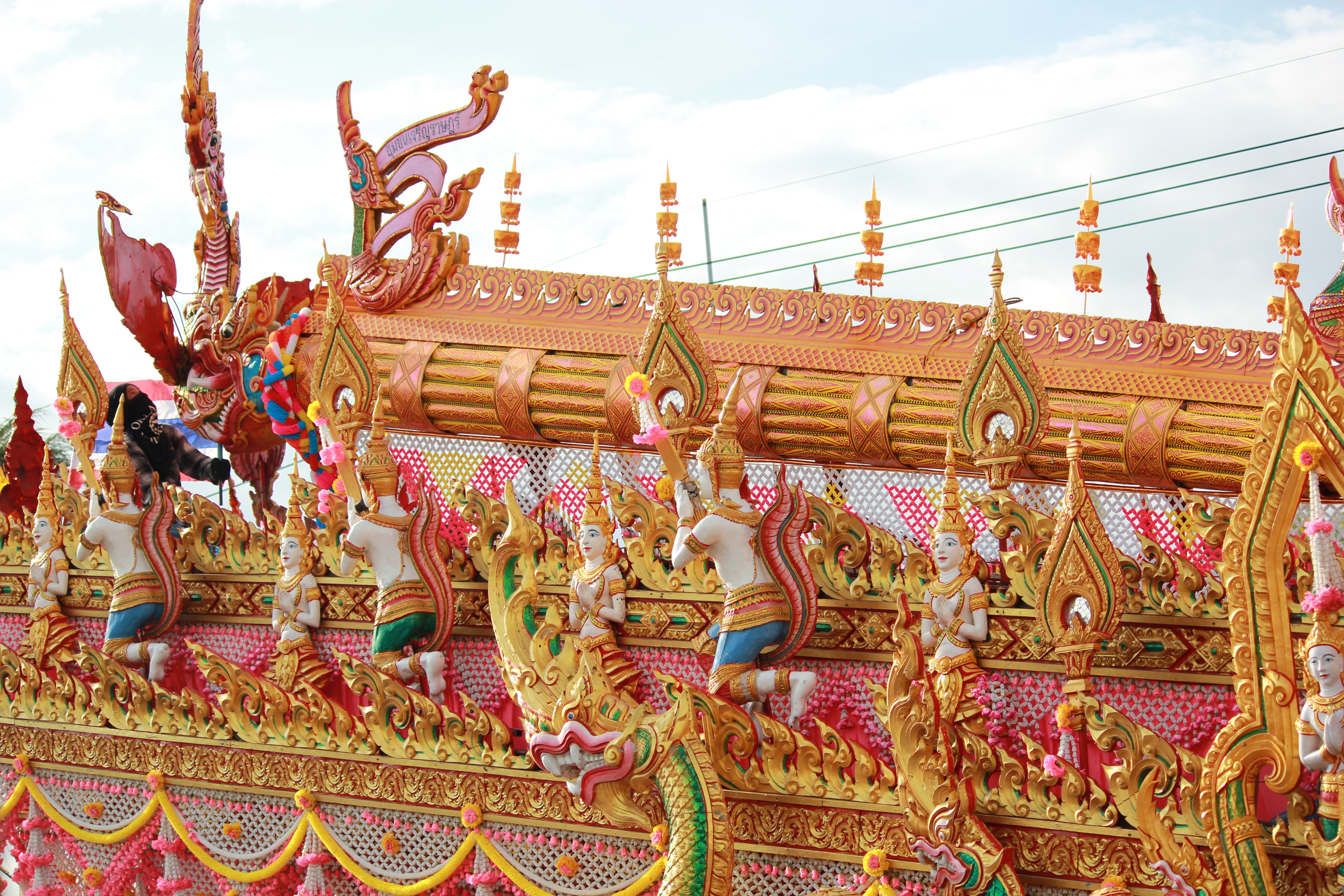
Bung Fai Line Sribhumi, Suwannaphum, Roi Et Province

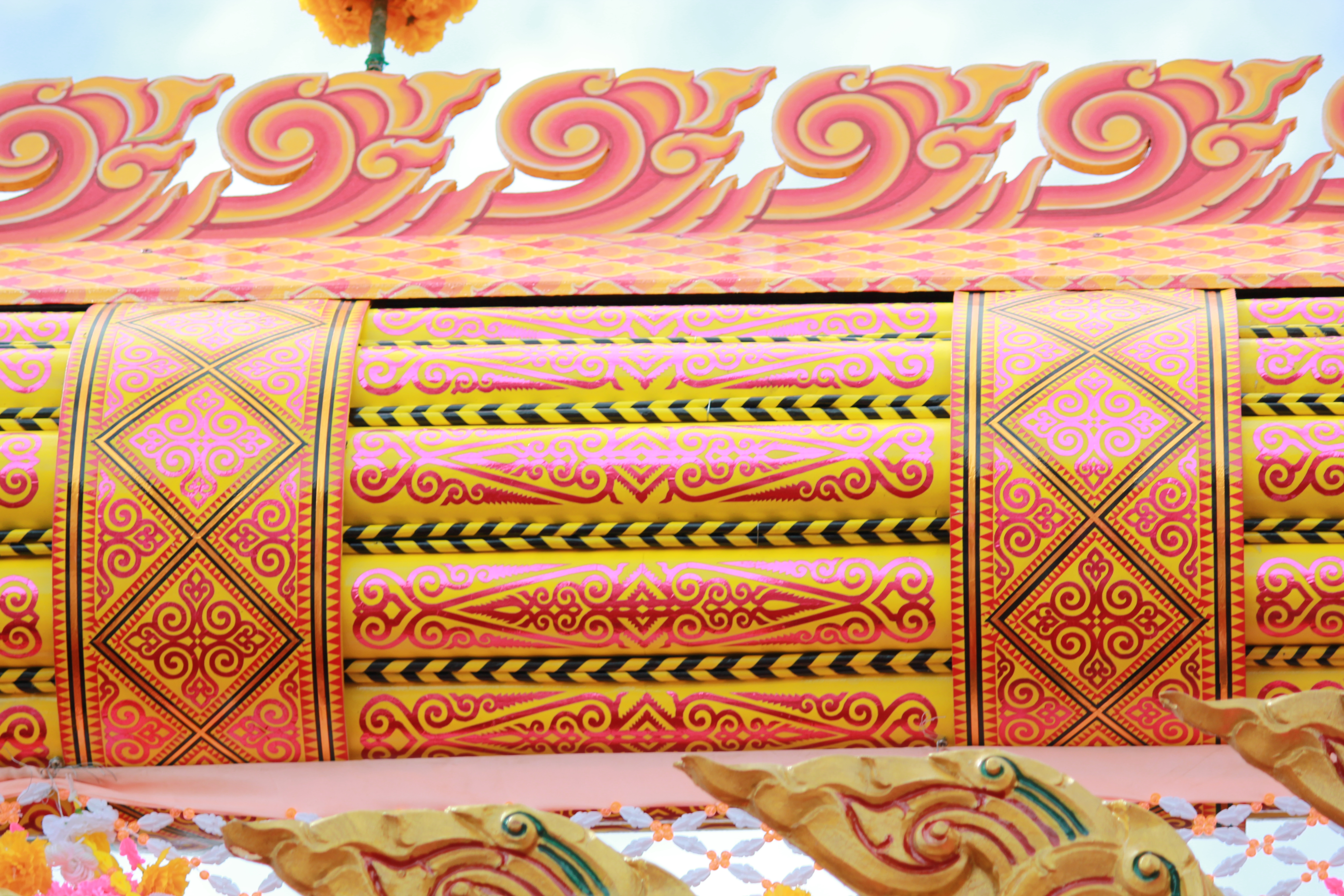
Pattern of Bung Fai Line Sribhumi which made by handle scissors cutting the line without the broken line, Suwannaphum, Roi Et Province

The traditional dress of Isan is the sarong. Women's sarongs most often have an embroidered border at the hem, while men's are in a checkered pattern. Men also wear a pakama, a versatile length of cloth which can be used as a belt, a money and document belt, headwear for protection from the sun, a hammock, or a swimsuit.

Isan is a center for the production of Thai silk. The trade received a major boost in the postwar years, when Jim Thompson popularized Thai silk among Westerners. One of the best-known types of Isan silk is mut-mee, which is tie-dyed to produce geometric patterns on the thread.

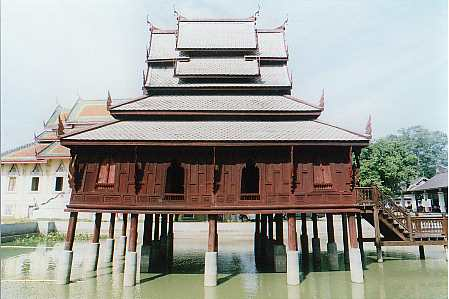
Library, Tung Sri Muang Temple, Ubon Ratchathani, illustrates the typical Isan style

The Buddhist temple (or wat) is the major feature of most villages. These temples are used for not only religious ceremonies but also festivals, particularly mor lam, and as assembly halls. They are mostly built in Lao-style, but with less ornamentation than the more elaborate central Thai temples or the Lao-style temples in central Laos. Lao-style Buddha images are also prevalent, as are hup taem murals depicting scenes from Buddhist tales and Lao epics like Sang Sinxay.

The people of Isan celebrate many traditional festivals, such as the Bun Bungfai Rocket Festival. This fertility rite, originating in pre-Buddhist times, is celebrated in a number of locations both in Isan and in Laos. Other Isan festivals are the Candle Festival, which marks the start of vassa in July in Ubon and other locations; the Silk Festival in Khon Kaen, which promotes local handicrafts; the Elephant Round-up in Surin; and the bangfai phayanak or Naga fireballs of Nong Khai.

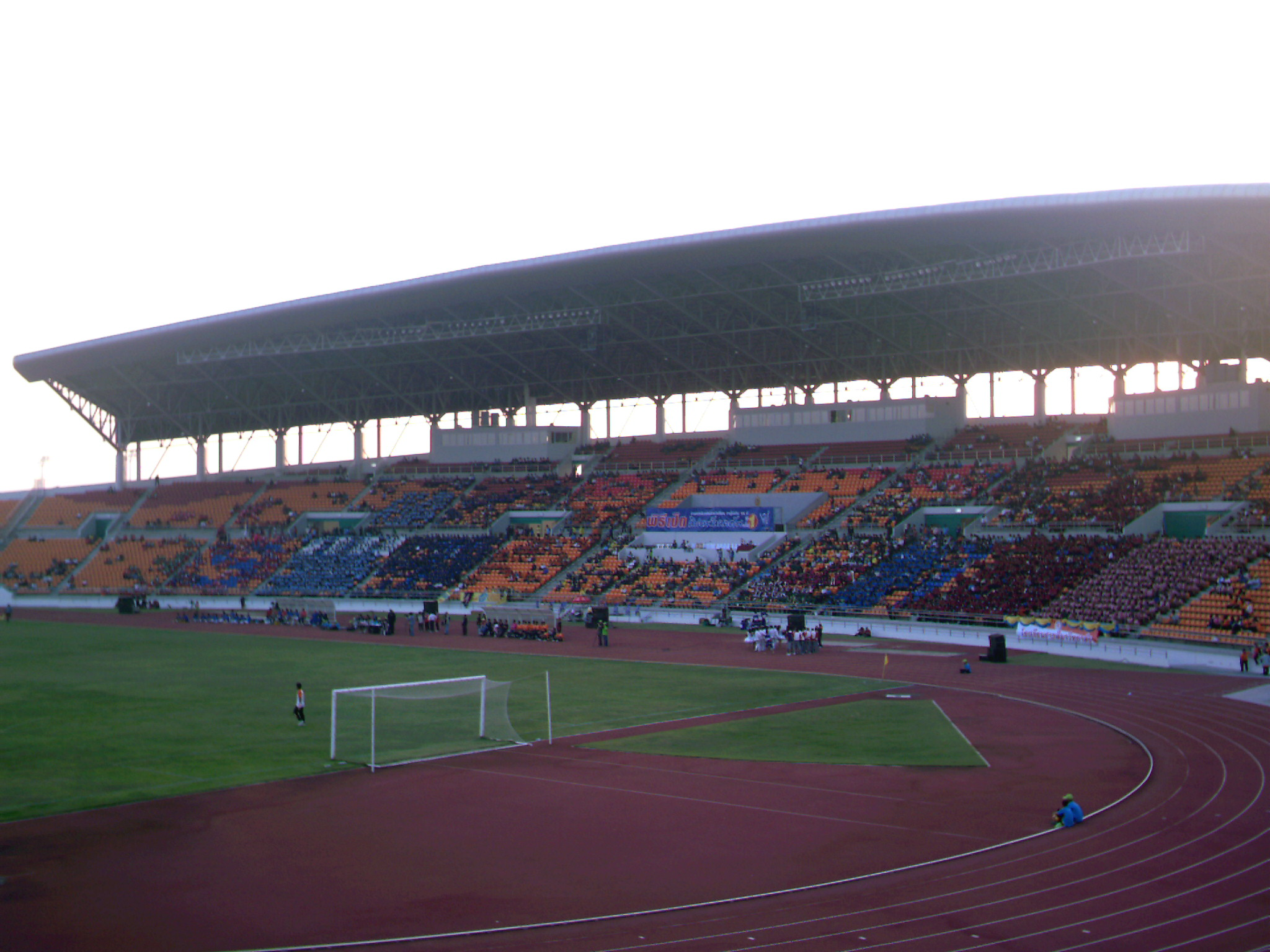
80th Birthday Stadium in Khorat

The main indigenous music of Isan is mor lam. It exists in a number of regional variants, plus modern forms. Since the late 1970s it has acquired greater exposure outside the region thanks to the presence of migrant workers in Bangkok. Many mor lam singers also sing central Thai luk thung music, and have produced the hybrid luk thung Isan form. Another form of folk music, kantrum, is popular with the Khmer minority in the south.

Mor lam needs a special mention as its festival-type production, which is very commonplace in Isan, has not been exported to other regions. When the locals speak of mor lam (pronounced mor'ram with stress on the second syllable), one will often hear them say pai doo morram ("go see mor'ram"). They are referring to the most common form of evening entertainment in the region. There are mor lam festivals on Friday or Saturday evenings in most villages. Usually, the rock-festival-sized stage is constructed either in a temple compound or on a sports field. Thousands of people sit on mats on the ground and watch the entertainment. The traditional music and song is accompanied by colorful choreography, executed by a group of up to 50 female (and some katoey) dancers. The fantastic costumes are changed several times throughout the program, and the transitions are bridged by often-raunchy gags, slapstick comedy, and speeches by local dignitaries. A mor lam festival is a family affair and the area is surrounded by food and drink stalls.

Although there is no tradition of written secular literature in the Isan language, in the latter half of the 20th century the region produced several notable writers, such as Khamsing Srinawk (who writes in Thai) and Pira Sudham (who writes in English).

Isan is known for producing a large number of muay Thai boxers. Many of the boxers from Srisaket, Buriram and Surin are of ethnically Suai (Kuy), Lao, or Khmer. Isan's most famous sportsman is tennis player Paradorn Srichaphan, whose family is from Khon Kaen.

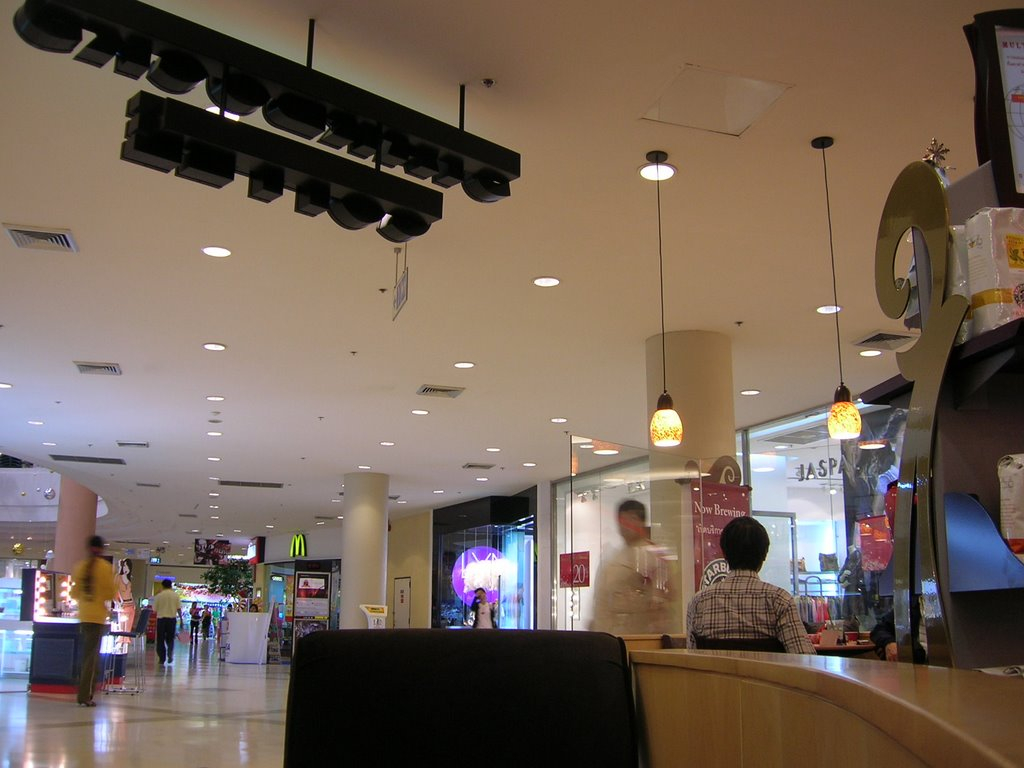
The Mall Nakhon Ratchasima

Marriage and courtship in Isan still mainly follows strict tradition, especially in rural areas, and most young women are married by the time they are 20 years old. Many girls, in spite of the legal requirement, marry as young as 14 to escape poverty, as marriage usually involves a bride dowry paid by the husband to the bride's family. A bride dowry will not normally be less than 40,000 baht, and according to the status of the bride and/or her family, can exceed 300,000 baht.

Despite the influence of tradition, in 2013, according to UNICEF, 191.5 births out of every 1,000 births in Isan were to adolescents aged 15–19. This is four times higher than the 2018 global average of 44 births per 1,000 according to the World Health Organization (WHO). In September 2019, the Ministry of Social Development and Human Security set a target to reduce the number of unintended teenage pregnancies countrywide to 25 births per 1,000 by 2026.

Isan women rarely have boyfriends until they meet the man they will marry, and tradition requires that the betrothal is then announced. Younger fiancées will be chaperoned, usually by a female friend, brother, or sister while in the company of their future husband. The wedding ceremony usually takes place in the bride's home and is normally officiated by one or several monks or a respected village elder who has been a monk. Young couples are increasingly registering their marriages at the city hall, which they can do if they are over 17. The extended family system is still very much the traditional social structure in Isan, with newlywed couples often living with in-laws or building a home on the family compound or farmland.

But it is not unusual for many women to remain single until much later. Tradition demands that the youngest or only daughter continue to live at home to take care of her parents. She is free to marry only when both parents are deceased. There is also the tradition that a woman should "marry up" in status. If a woman is tied to an occupation in a rural area as a farm or business owner, teacher, or similar profession, finding a suitable husband who is prepared to relocate is often not easy.

Water buffalo are a regular feature, even in the suburbs, being walked to and from the fields at dawn and dusk. Although rarely used nowadays for working the land, they are considered an important status symbol. The current value (2010) of one head of buffalo is about 20,000 baht (2010: US$620).

The cultural separation from central Thailand, combined with the region's poverty and its people's typically dark skin, have led to considerable discrimination against the people of Isan by non-ethnic Thais of Chinese descent. Even though many Isan people now work in the cities rather than in the fields, many hold lower-status jobs such as construction workers, stall vendors, and tuk-tuk taxi drivers, and discriminatory attitudes have been known to persist among the Thai-Chinese. Nevertheless, Isan food and music have both been enthusiastically adopted and adapted to the tastes of the rest of the country.

The process of Thaification, resulting from central Thais' perceived threat of Lao cultural dominance in the Isan region, has somewhat diluted Isan culture's distinctive character, particularly in the cities and in provinces, such as Khorat, that are closest to the central Thai heartlands and have been under Thai rule the longest.

== Religion ==
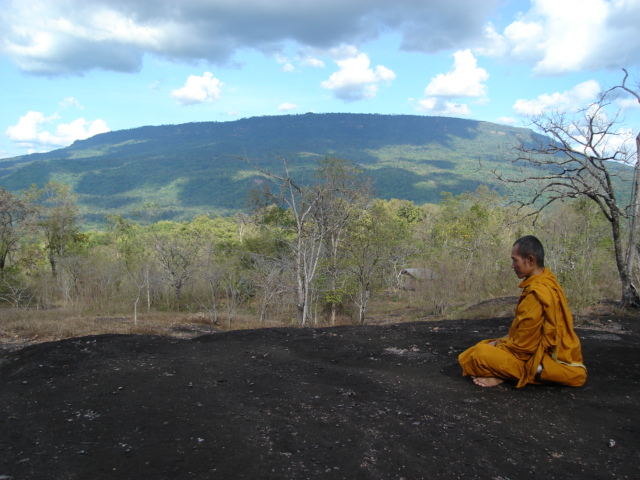
Phu Kradueng

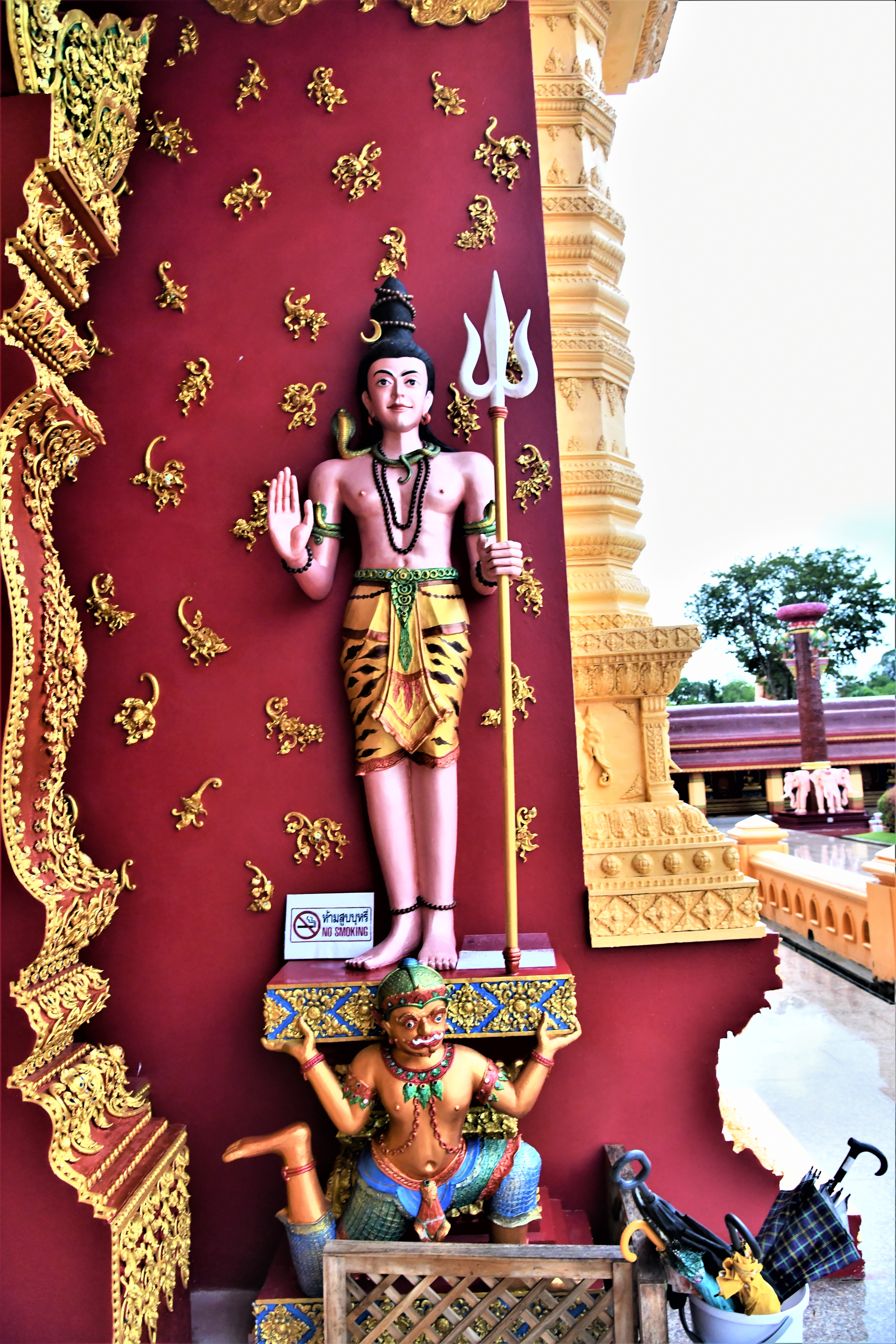
Thai depiction of Phra Isuan who is revered as guardian of Isan or 'the northeastern direction'.

As in the rest of Thailand, the population is mostly Theravāda Buddhist, although this is combined with elements of animism. Larger cities have Christian churches. Many major district towns have a small Christian church or chapel, usually Roman Catholic, and there are others in rural areas.

The world-famous Buddhist monk Ajahn Chah was born in Isan.

== Transportation ==
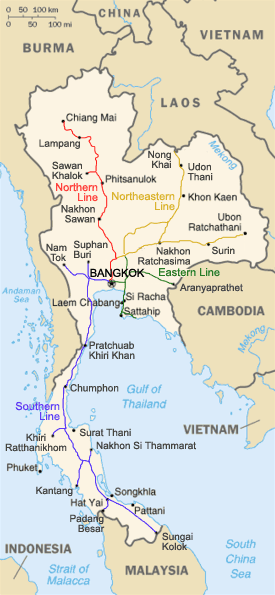
The railway network, one of the major transportation systems of Isan.

=== Communications ===
Traditionally, messages between the government in Bangkok and Isan provincial outposts had been carried by "pony express" or by fast boat. During the reign of King Chulalongkorn (r. 1868–1910), the Ministry of Interior maintained a schedule which specified that messages between Bangkok and Nong Khai took 12 days, between Bangkok and Ubon Ratchathani, 12 days, and between Bangkok and Luang Prabang, 17 days outbound and 13 days inbound.

=== Rail ===
Until 1900, when the first rail line from Bangkok to Khorat was opened, the shipment of goods took at least eight or nine days to go between the two. Now goods could be transported in a day. The speed with which goods could reach Khorat from Bangkok permitted the introduction into Isan of items previously too expensive or too perishable to transport. By 1928 a section of the northeastern rail line was extended to Ubon and by 1933 another section had reached Khon Kaen. It would not extend to Nong Khai until 1955. Trading patterns between the central region and Isan were forever altered.

The State Railway of Thailand has two main lines in Isan, both connecting the region to Bangkok. One runs east from Khorat, through Surin to Ubon; the other runs north through Khon Kaen and Udon to Nong Khai. In early-2009, a rail link from Nong Khai came into operation. It crosses the Friendship road bridge into Laos territory to a terminus a few kilometres north of the land border crossing. It remains unclear whether this line will be extended the remaining 20 kilometres to Vientiane, the capital of Laos.

=== Road ===
According to one report in 1895, it took about three weeks to travel overland by ox cart from Nong Khai to Khorat and another eight or nine days to travel from Khorat to Bangkok. Automobile transport made its first appearance in Isan sometime in the 1920s but did not expand rapidly until after the Second World War.

There are 15,000 km (9,300 mi) of highway, centered on the Thanon Mitraphap ("Friendship Highway") from Khorat to Nong Khai built by the United States in the 1960s at a cost of US$20 million to supply its northeastern military bases. A road bridge (the Saphan Mitraphap or Friendship Bridge) jointly built by the Australian, Lao, and Thai governments forms the border crossing over the Mekong River on the outskirts of Nong Khai to Vientiane, the capital of Laos, about 25 km (16 mi) away.

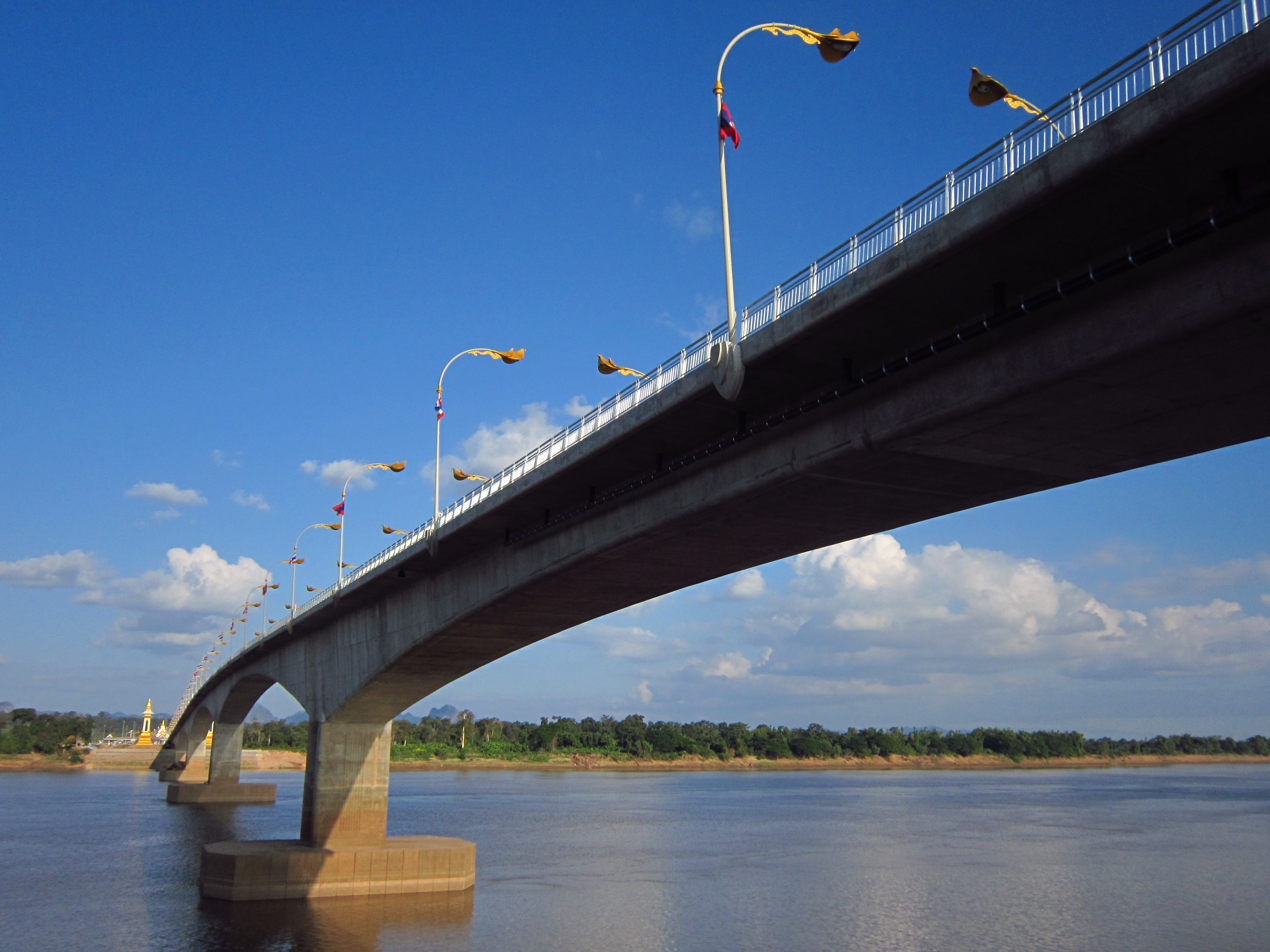
Third Thai–Lao Friendship Bridge

Most roads in Isan are paved. All major roads interconnecting the provincial capitals are in excellent condition for driving, and most are centrally divided four or six-lane highways. Many roads connecting province capitals to larger district towns are also currently (2008) being widened to four-lane highways with median strips. The paving on some very minor roads in the poorer districts may be navigable with difficulty due to large, deep potholes. Unpaved, graded roads link some of the smaller, more remote villages, but they are comfortably navigable at normal driving speeds for wheeled vehicles. Most of the stretches of paved roads through villages are lighted at night, many with powerful sodium lighting, some of which are on independently solar-powered masts. Reflective "cats-eyes" marking the central line of two-lane roads are a common feature. Crash barriers are installed along the sides of dangerous bends and precipitous verges. Signposting is excellent and follows international style. Since 2002 (with the exception of some poorer sub-districts), all signs are bilingual in Thai and Roman script.

The main highways have frequent, Western-style rest and refueling stations which accept payment by major credit/debit cards. In 2006, all fuel stations sell 91 and 95 octane gasoline/petrol and diesel fuel. LPG (Liquid Petroleum Gas) and NGV (natural gas for vehicles) were till recently very rare outside the cities of Nakhon Ratchasima, Khon Kaen, and Udon Thani. As of 2012, many new LPG and NGV stations have opened. Since 2009, bio-diesel fuel has become increasingly available.

=== Air ===
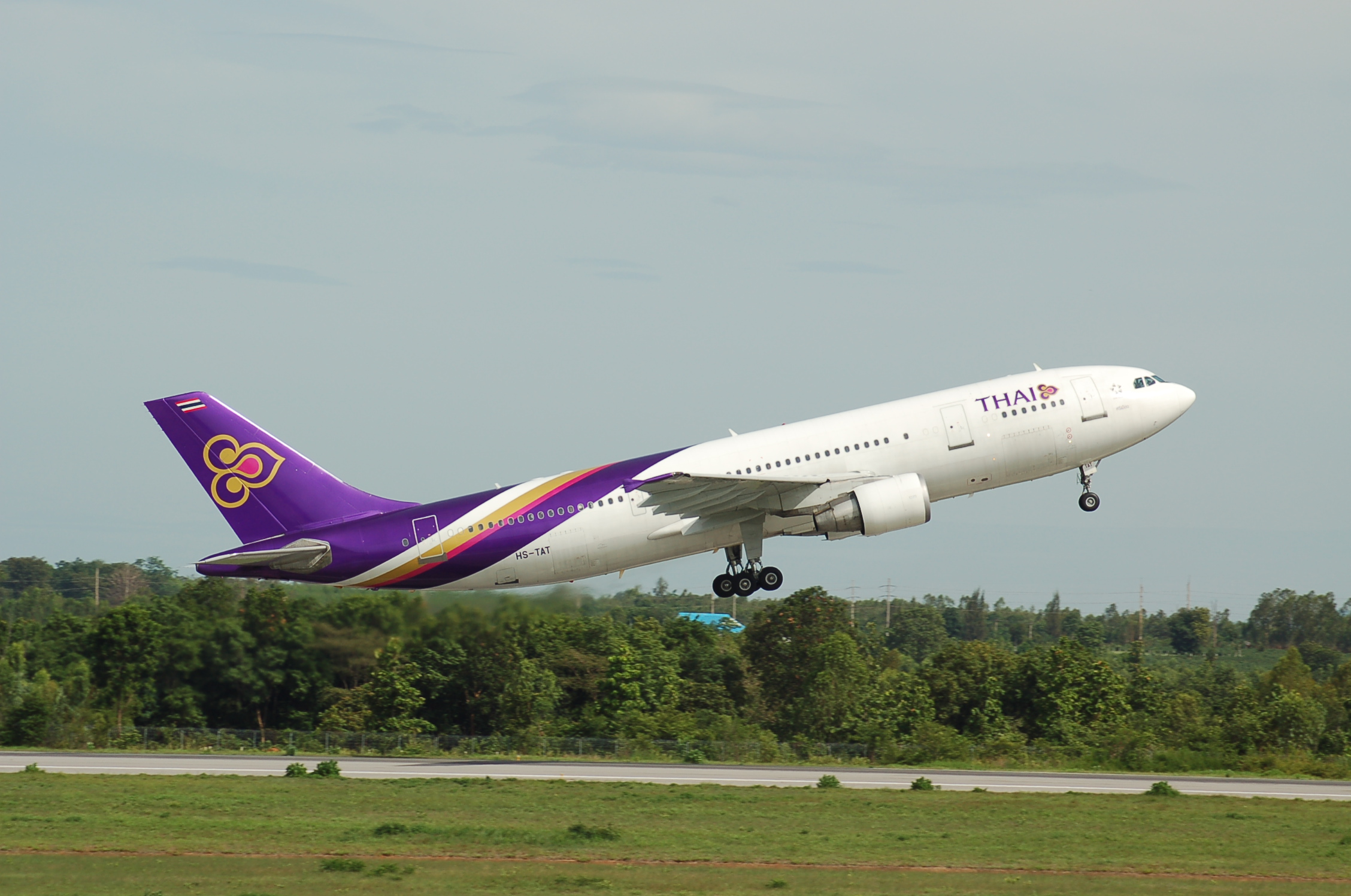
Thai Airways Airbus A300 departing Khon Kaen

In 1960 air service by Thai Airways to several northeastern towns was inaugurated. By 1963 there were regular flights between Bangkok and Nakhon Phanom, Ubon, Khon Kaen, and Udon.

There are airports at Khorat (at the present time no scheduled services due to its proximity to Bangkok making air service difficult to justify financially), Khon Kaen (domestic), Ubon Ratchathani (domestic), Udon Thani (international), Nakhon Phanom (domestic, scheduled services), Sakon Nakhon (domestic, scheduled services), Roi Et (domestic, scheduled services), Buriram (domestic, scheduled services) and Loei (domestic, scheduled services).

Domestic air travel between the capital and the region is well developed, and has become a viable alternative to rail, long-distance bus, and self-driving. Fares are cheap by foreign standards, and Udon and Khon Kaen which both opened brand new airport terminals in 2005 and 2006 respectively, are served by many daily flights and also have routes connecting other major destinations in Thailand with some companies operating wide-bodied aircraft. Most domestic flights to and from Bangkok operate to and from Don Muang, the original Bangkok international airport, while Thai Airways flights serve Bangkok International Airport in Suvarnabhumi.

=== Bus ===
Buses provide mass transport throughout the region. All provincial cities are connected to Bangkok by daily and nightly, direct, air-conditioned bus routes. All district amphoe towns operate at least one similar nightly route to and from Bangkok. All towns and villages are interconnected with frequent services of songthaew (Thai: สองแถว, lit. "two rows") a covered truck-style bus or covered pick-up trucks with bench seats in the cargo bed.

Taxi transport is not well developed, even in the very large cities, where samlor (Thai: สามล้อ, lit. 'three wheels'), three-wheeled motorcycle taxis similar to the Bangkok tuk-tuk, provide the mainstay of urban transport. The large cities do have some pick-up trucks operating on regular inner-city and suburban routes. Airports are served by collective vans, which tend to be expensive for the local population, and samlors for private hire.

=== Waterways ===
In this region, rapids and variable flow make navigation difficult on the Mekong River, so large boat traffic is limited in connection with downriver areas. Bridges are rare because of the high cost of spanning the wide river; passenger and vehicle ferries link its two sides. The Second Thai–Lao Friendship Bridge, spanning the Mekong between the cities of Mukdahan (Thailand) and Savannakhet (Laos), was completed and officially opened for traffic on 20 December 2006. Some new bridges, not included on the 2005 maps, have been built over smaller rivers and dams. Passenger and vehicle ferries also operate across some large reservoirs.

Improved infrastructure and ease of travel restrictions between Thailand and Laos has allowed the continued movement of thousands of people every day, with people on either side crossing the river to visit relatives, shop, participate in religious festivals, conduct business or day-trip, with the Nong Khai-Vientiane Mukdahan-Savannakhét and Nakhon Phanom-Thakhèk border crossings particularly important due to the construction of bridges. Other major border crossings include Bueng Kan-Pakxan and the only non-Mekong checkpoint Chong Mek-Vangtao, although ferries cross the river in other areas. The familiarity of the language makes travel and business easy for Isan speakers, who are able to use their language freely in Laos and be understood.

== Administrative divisions ==
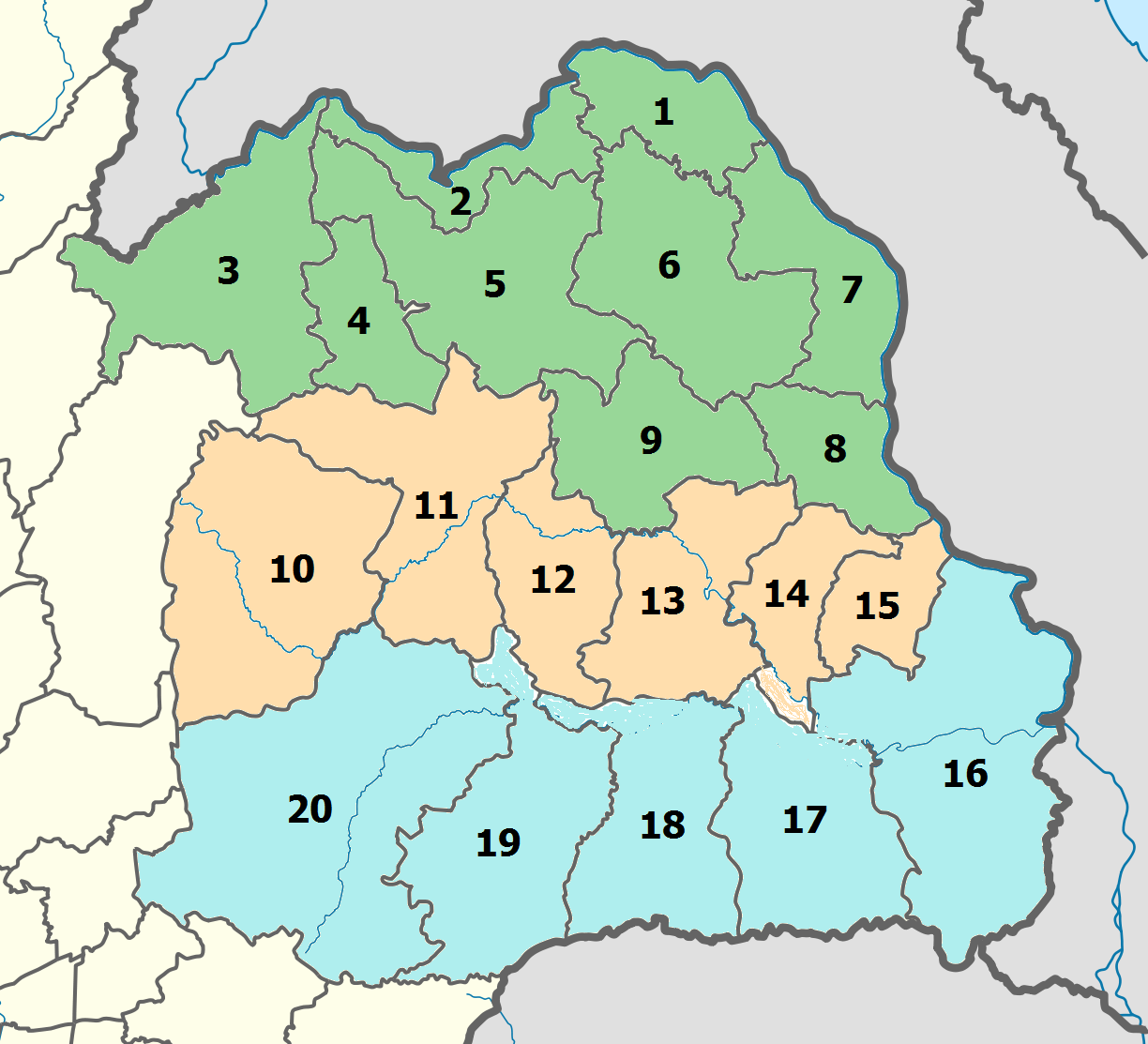
Upper, middle, and lower provinces of Isan

Isan is divided into 20 provinces, grouped into three statistical subregions. Nakhon Ratchasima Province is considered by some to be in central Thailand.

Flag	Seal		Province	Capital	DOPA	Population	Area (km^{2})	Density	ISO
		1	Bueng Kan	Bueng Kan	27	424,091	4,003	106	TH-38
		2	Nong Khai	Nong Khai	70	522,311	3,275	160	TH-43
		3	Loei	Loei	55	642,950	10,500	61	TH-42
		4	Nong Bua Lamphu	Nong Bua Lamphu	71	512,780	4,099	125	TH-39
		5	Udon Thani	Udon Thani	74	1,586,646	11,072	143	TH-41
		6	Sakon Nakhon	Sakon Nakhon	57	1,153,390	9,580	121	TH-47
		7	Nakhon Phanom	Nakhon Phanom	20	719,136	5,637	127	TH-48
		8	Mukdahan	Mukdahan	44	353,174	4,126	87	TH-49
		9	Kalasin	Kalasin	4	983,418	6,936	142	TH-46
		10	Chaiyaphum	Chaiyaphum	11	1,137,357	12,698	91	TH-36
		11	Khon Kaen	Khon Kaen	6	1,802,872	10,659	169	TH-40
		12	Maha Sarakham	Maha Sarakham	43	962,665	5,607	172	TH-44
		13	Roi Et	Roi Et	48	1,305,211	7,873	166	TH-45
		14	Yasothon	Yasothon	46	537,299	4,131	130	TH-35
		15	Amnat Charoen	Amnat Charoen	73	378,438	3,290	115	TH-37
		16	Ubon Ratchathani	Ubon Ratchathani	77	1,878,146	15,626	120	TH-34
		17	Sisaket	Sisaket	56	1,472,859	8,936	165	TH-33
		18	Surin	Surin	69	1,396,831	8,854	157	TH-32
		19	Buriram	Buriram	28	1,595,747	10,080	159	TH-31
		20	Nakhon Ratchasima	Nakhon Ratchasima	21	2,648,927	20,736	128	TH-30

Note: Populations as of 31 December 2019.

Isan returns 136 of the national parliament's 400 constituency MPs. In the 2005 election, the Thai Rak Thai party took 126 of these seats, with six for Chart Thai and two each for the Democrat party and Mahachon Party.

== Notable natives or residents ==
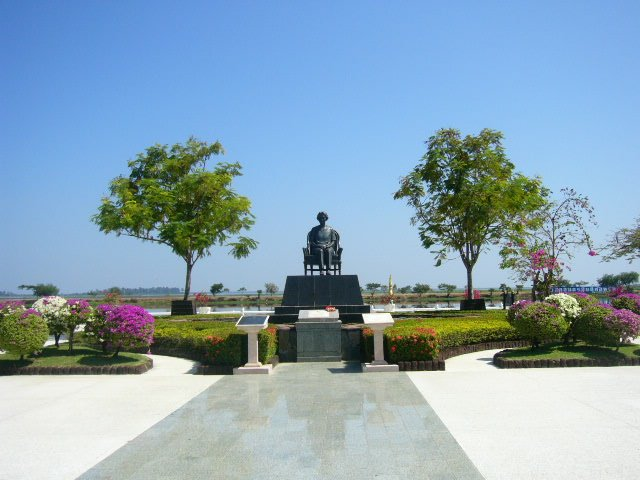
Royal Grandmother Statue Srinagarindra, Sakon Nakhon

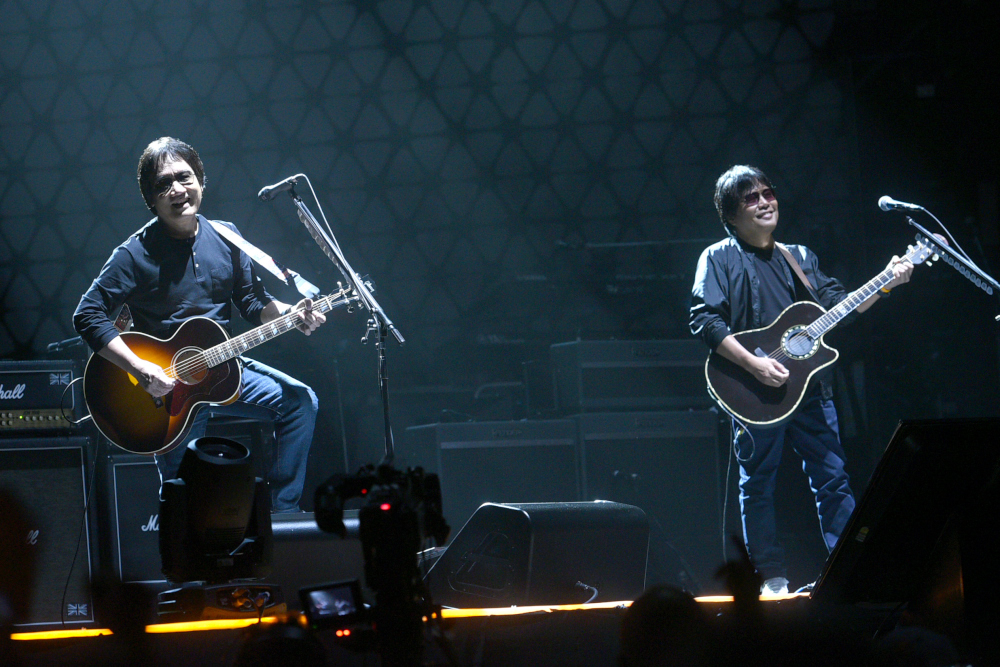
Asanee–Wasan (born in Loei Province)

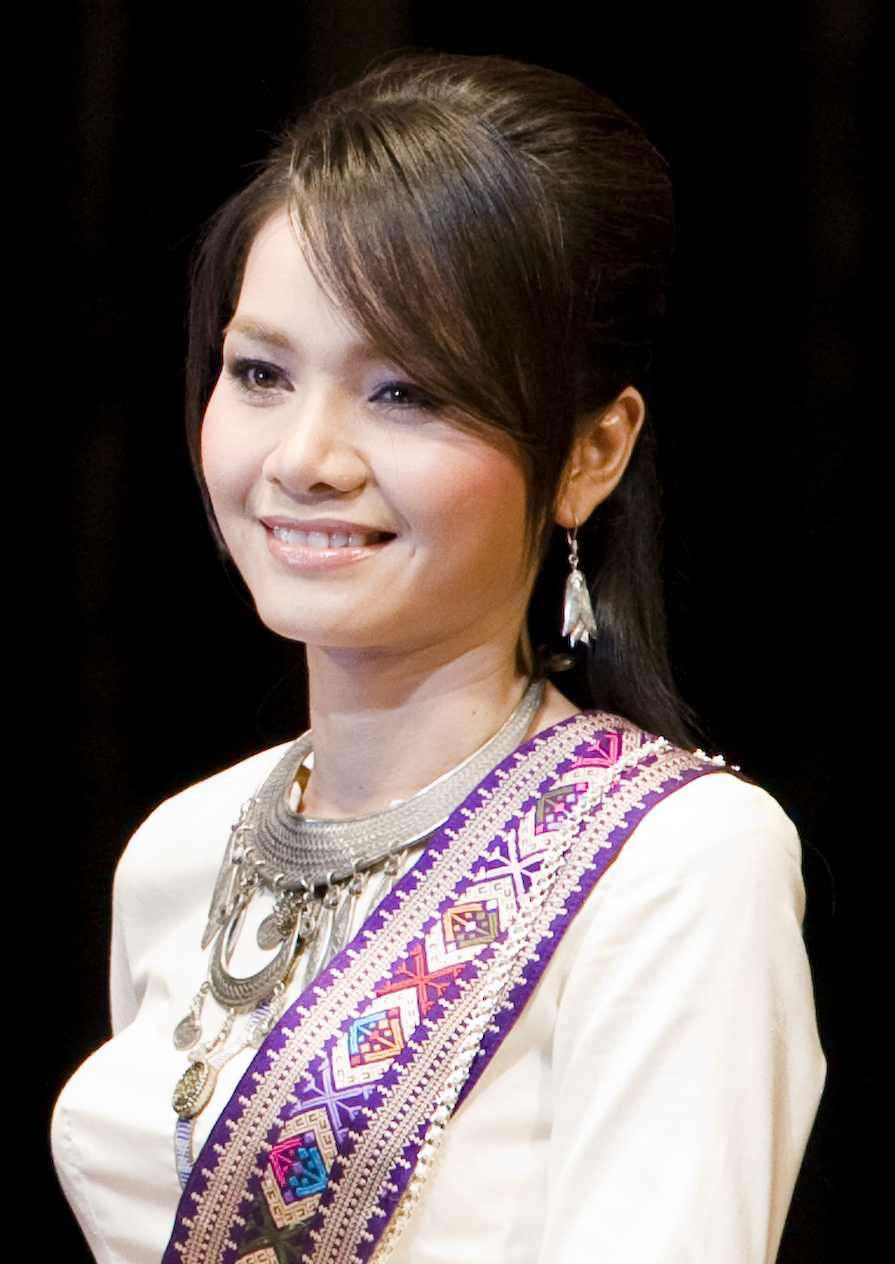
Tai Orathai (born in Ubon Ratchathani Province)

Famous singers from Isan

Buddhist monks

- Ajahn Mun Bhuridatta Thera, born in Ubon Ratchathani Province
- Luang Por Ajahn Chah, born in Ubon Ratchathani Province
- Luangta Ajahn Maha Bua, born in Udon Thani Province
- Luang Por Khun Parissuddho, born in Nakhon Ratchasima Province

Politicians and activists

- Sarit Thanarat, born in Bangkok, but he is half-blooded from the provinces of Bangkok and Mukdahan Province. His father is a native of Bangkok and his mother is a native what is now Mukdahan Province.
- Praphas Charusathien, born in Udon Thani Province
- Anon Nampa, born in Roi Et Province
- Prayut Chan-o-cha, born in Nakhon Ratchasima Province
- Chai Chidchob, born in Surin Province
- Newin Chidchob, born in Buriram Province
- Tiwagorn Withiton, born in Khon Kaen Province
- Jiraporn Sindhuprai, born in Roi Et Province

Writers

- Pira Sudham, born in Buriram Province
- Ratchanee Sripraiwan, born in Maha Sarakham Province

Actors and actress

- Nadech Kugimiya, born in Khon Kaen Province
- Sukollawat Kanarot, born in Khon Kaen Province
- Nichaphat Chatchaipholrat, born in Khon Kaen Province
- Sombat Metanee, born in Ubon Ratchathani Province
- Tony Jaa, born in Surin Province
- Peechaya Wattanamontree, born in Khon Kaen Province
- Kanyawee Songmuang, born in Roi Et Province

Comedians

- Mum Jokmok, born in Yasothon Province
- Sudarat Butrprom, born in Udon Thani Province

Martial arts choreographers

- Panna Rittikrai, born in Khon Kaen Province

Singers

- Honey Sri-Isan, born in Kalasin Province, singing styles: Mor lam, Luk thung
- Siriporn Ampaipong, born in Udon Thani Province, singing styles: Mor lam, Luk thung
- Banyen Rakgan, born in Ubon Ratchathani Province, singing styles: Mor lam, Luk thung
- Sunaree Ratchasima, born in Nakhon Ratchasima Province, singing style: Luk thung
- Tai Orathai, born in Ubon Ratchathani Province, singing styles: Mor lam, Luk thung
- Pornsak Songsaeng, born in Khon Kaen Province, singing style: Luk thung
- Monsit Khamsoi, born in Mukdahan Province, singing style: Luk thung
- Mike Phiromphon, born in Udon Thani Province, singing styles: Mor lam, Luk thung
- Maithai Huajaisin, born in Nakhon Ratchasima Province, singing styles: Mor lam, Luk thung
- Phai Phongsathon, born in Yasothon Province, singing styles: Mor lam, Luk thung
- Monkaen Kaenkoon, born in Yasothon Province, singing styles: Mor lam, Luk thung
- Mangpor Chonthicha, born in Khon Kaen Province, singing styles: Mor lam, Luk thung
- Vieng Narumon, born in Roi Et Province, singing styles: Mor lam, Luk thung
- Lamyai Haithongkham, born in Roi Et Province, singing styles: Mor lam, Luk thung, Thai pop
- Am Chonthicha, born in Amnat Charoen Province, singing styles: Mor lam, Luk thung, Thai pop
- Asanee–Wasan, born in Loei Province, singing style: Rock
- Thanapol Intharit, born in Kalasin Province, singing styles: Rock, Phleng phuea chiwit
- Pongsit Kamphee, born in Nong Khai Province, singing style: Songs for Life
- Phongthep Kradonchamnan, born in Nakhon Ratchasima Province, singing styles: Folk, Songs for Life
- Jakrapun Kornburiteerachote, born in Nakhon Ratchasima Province, singing styles: Pop, luk thung
- Seksan Sukpimai, born in Nakhon Ratchasima Province, singing style: Rock
- Yingyong Yodbuangarm, born in Sisaket Province, singing styles: Luk thung, Kantrum
- Lalisa Manoban, born in Buriram Province, K-pop singer

Sports

- Somluck Kamsing, the first Thai Olympic gold medalist in amateur boxer, born in Khon Kaen Province.
- Paradorn Srichaphan, tennis player, born in Khon Kaen Province.
- Ratchanok Intanon, badminton player, born in Yasothon, She is half-blooded from the provinces of Roi Et and Yasothon. Her father is a native of Yasothon and her mother is a native of Roi Et.
- Surat Sukha, football player, born in Sakon Nakhon Province, who played with Melbourne Victory FC, Victoria, Australia between 2009 and 2011, and currently plays for Buriram United F.C.
- Buakaw Banchamek, Muay Thai kickboxer, born in Surin Province and is of Kuy descent.
- Saenchai Sor Kingstar, Muay Thai kickboxer, born in Maha Sarakham Province.
- Srisaket Sor Rungvisai, professional boxer, born in Sisaket Province.
- Chatchai Sasakul, professional boxing trainer and former boxer, born in Nakhon Ratchasima Province and resides at Bangkok.
- Kiatisuk Senamuang, football coach and former player, born in Udon Thani Province and resides at Khon Kaen Province.
- Namphon Nongkeepahuyuth, late Muay Thai kickboxer, born in Buriram Province.
- Namkabuan Nongkeepahuyuth, late Muay Thai kickboxer, born in Buriram Province.
- Samson Dutch Boy Gym, former Muay Thai kickboxer and professional boxer, born in Roi Et Province.
