= Khon Kaen Silk Festival =

Event held in Khon Kaen, Isan, Thailand

The International Silk Festival, Phi Suea tradition and Charity Fair (Thai: งานเทศกาลไหมนานาชาติ ประเพณีผูกเสี่ยว), commonly known as the Khon Kaen Silk Festival is an event held in Khon Kaen, Isan, Thailand over twelve days at the end of November and the beginning of December each year.

The event is centred on promotion of the local silk industry, but includes a wide range of other activities including parades, performances of mor lam music, and mass dances featuring up to 25,000 people.

First held in 1979, the festival has undergone several name changes as it has developed and broadened its scope. While still widely referred to as the Khon Kaen Silk Festival, it is now officially known as the "International Silk Festival, Phi Suea tradition and Charity Fair". Silk products from other southeast Asian countries are promoted alongside local creations. Fundraising for the Red Cross is also a focus. The Phuk Sieo ceremony sees senior people tying symbolic threads on the wrists of younger participants, as a mark of mutual support and social cohesion.
