= ISO 639:p =

List of ISO 639-3 language codes starting with P

This is a list of ISO 639-3 language codes starting with P.

Index | a | b | c | d | e | f | g | h | i | j | k | l | m | n | o | p | q | r | s | t | u | v | w | x | y | z

Abbreviations are used in the table as follows:

- Scope: I = individual language, M = macrolanguage, S = special code
- Type: C = constructed, E = extinct (in recent times), H = historical (distinct from its modern form), L = living, S = special code

Deprecated codes are enclosed in (parentheses).

The column Family contains the generic English name of the language's family or macrolanguage.

ISO 639 codes			Scope/Type	Family	Language names	
639-3	639-1	639-2/B	Scope/Type	Family	Native	ISO name
pab			I/L	Arawakan	Haliti-Paresi	Parecís
pac			I/L			Pacoh
pad			I/L			Paumarí
pae			I/L			Pagibete
paf			I/E			Paranawát
pag		pag	I/L		Pangasinán	Pangasinan
pah			I/L			Tenharim
pai			I/L			Pe
(paj)			I/L			Ipeka-Tapuia
pak			I/L	Tupian		Parakanã
pal		pal	I/H			Pahlavi
pam		pam	I/L		Kapampangan	Kapampangan; Pampanga
pan	pa	pan	I/L	Indo-European	ਪੰਜਾਬੀ	Panjabi; Punjabi
pao			I/L			Northern Paiute
pap		pap	I/L		Papiamentu	Papiamento
paq			I/L			Parya
par			I/L			Panamint; Timbisha
pas			I/L			Papasena
(pat)			I/L			Papitalai
pau		pau	I/L		tekoi ra Belau	Palauan
pav			I/L			Pakaásnovos
paw			I/L			Pawnee
pax			I/E	language isolate		Pankararé
pay			I/L			Pech
paz			I/E	language isolate		Pankararú
pbb			I/L			Páez
pbc			I/L			Patamona
pbe			I/L			Mezontla Popoloca
pbf			I/L			Coyotepec Popoloca
pbg			I/E			Paraujano
pbh			I/L	Cariban	Eʼñapa Woromaipu	E'ñapa Woromaipu
pbi			I/L			Parkwa
pbl			I/L			Mak (Nigeria)
pbm			I/L	Oto-Manguean		Puebla Mazatec
pbn			I/L			Kpasam
pbo			I/L			Papel
pbp			I/L			Badyara
pbr			I/L			Pangwa
pbs			I/L			Central Pame
pbt			I/L			Southern Pashto
pbu			I/L			Northern Pashto
pbv			I/L			Pnar
pby			I/L			Pyu (Papua New Guinea)
(pbz)			I/L	spurious language		Palu
pca			I/L			Santa Inés Ahuatempan Popoloca
pcb			I/L			Pear
pcc			I/L			Bouyei
pcd			I/L		picard	Picard
pce			I/L			Ruching Palaung
pcf			I/L			Paliyan
pcg			I/L			Paniya
pch			I/L			Pardhan
pci			I/L			Duruwa
pcj			I/L			Parenga
pck			I/L			Paite Chin
pcl			I/L			Pardhi
pcm			I/L			Nigerian Pidgin
pcn			I/L			Piti
pcp			I/L			Pacahuara
(pcr)			I/L			Panang
pcw			I/L			Pyapun
pda			I/L			Anam
pdc			I/L		Pennsilfaani-Deitsch	Pennsylvania German
pdi			I/L			Pa Di
pdn			I/L			Fedan; Podena
pdo			I/L			Padoe
pdt			I/L		Plautdietsch	Plautdietsch
pdu			I/L			Kayan
pea			I/L			Peranakan Indonesian
peb			I/E			Eastern Pomo
(pec)			I/L			Southern Pesisir
ped			I/L			Mala (Papua New Guinea)
pee			I/L			Taje
pef			I/E			Northeastern Pomo
peg			I/L			Pengo
peh			I/L			Bonan
pei			I/L			Chichimeca-Jonaz
pej			I/E			Northern Pomo
pek			I/L			Penchal
pel			I/L			Pekal
pem			I/L			Phende
(pen)			I/L			Penesak
peo		peo	I/H	Indo-European	𐎠𐎼𐎹	Old Persian (ca. 600-400 B.C.)
pep			I/L			Kunja
peq			I/L			Southern Pomo
pes			I/L		فارسی	Iranian Persian
pev			I/L			Pémono
pex			I/L			Petats
pey			I/L			Petjo
pez			I/L			Eastern Penan
pfa			I/L			Pááfang
pfe			I/L			Pere
pfl			I/L		Pälzisch	Pfaelzisch
pga			I/L			Sudanese Creole Arabic
pgd			I/H	Indo-European		Gāndhārī
pgg			I/L			Pangwali
pgi			I/L			Pagi
pgk			I/L			Rerep
pgl			I/H			Primitive Irish
pgn			I/H			Paelignian
pgs			I/L			Pangseng
pgu			I/L			Pagu
(pgy)			I/L	spurious language		Pongyong
pgz			I/L			Papua New Guinean Sign Language
pha			I/L			Pa-Hng
phd			I/L			Phudagi
phg			I/L			Phuong
phh			I/L			Phukha
phj			I/L	Sino-Tibetan		Pahari
phk			I/L			Phake
phl			I/L			Palula; Phalura
phm			I/L			Phimbi
phn		phn	I/H			Phoenician
pho			I/L			Phunoi
phq			I/L			Phana'
phr			I/L			Pahari-Potwari
pht			I/L			Phu Thai
phu			I/L			Phuan
phv			I/L			Pahlavani
phw			I/L	Sino-Tibetan	याक्खा	Phangduwali
pia			I/L			Pima Bajo
pib			I/L			Yine
pic			I/L			Pinji
pid			I/L			Piaroa
pie			I/E			Piro
pif			I/L			Pingelapese
pig			I/L			Pisabo
pih			I/L		Norfuk	Pitcairn-Norfolk
(pii)			I/L	spurious language		Pini
pij			I/E			Pijao
pil			I/L			Yom
pim			I/E			Powhatan
pin			I/L			Piame
pio			I/L	Arawakan	Cháse	Piapoco
pip			I/L			Pero
pir			I/L			Piratapuyo
pis			I/L			Pijin
pit			I/E			Pitta Pitta
piu			I/L			Pintupi-Luritja
piv			I/L			Pileni; Vaeakau-Taumako
piw			I/L			Pimbwe
pix			I/L			Piu
piy			I/L			Piya-Kwonci
piz			I/L			Pije
pjt			I/L			Pitjantjatjara
pka			I/H	Indo-European	𑀅𑀭𑁆𑀥𑀫𑀸𑀕𑀥𑀻	Ardhamāgadhī Prākrit
pkb			I/L			Kipfokomo; Pokomo
pkc			I/H			Paekche
pkg			I/L			Pak-Tong
pkh			I/L			Pankhu
pkn			I/L			Pakanha
pko			I/L			Pökoot
pkp			I/L			Pukapuka
pkr			I/L	Dravidian	അട്ടപ്പാടി കുറുംബ	Attapady Kurumba
pks			I/L			Pakistan Sign Language
pkt			I/L			Maleng
pku			I/L			Paku
pla			I/L			Miani
plb			I/L			Polonombauk
plc			I/L			Central Palawano
pld			I/L			Polari
ple			I/L			Palu'e
plg			I/L			Pilagá
plh			I/L			Paulohi
pli	pi	pli	I/H	Indo-European	पालि, पाळि	Pali
(plj)			I/L			Polci
plk			I/L			Kohistani Shina
pll			I/L			Shwe Palaung
(plm)			I/L			Palembang
pln			I/L			Palenquero
plo			I/L			Oluta Popoluca
(plp)			I/L	spurious language		Palpa
plq			I/H			Palaic
plr			I/L			Palaka Senoufo
pls			I/L			San Marcos Tlacoyalco Popoloca; San Marcos Tlalcoyalco Popoloca
plt			I/L			Plateau Malagasy
plu			I/L	Arawakan	Pa'ikwené	Palikúr
plv			I/L			Southwest Palawano
plw			I/L			Brooke's Point Palawano
ply			I/L			Bolyu
plz			I/L			Paluan
pma			I/L			Paama
pmb			I/L			Pambia
(pmc)			I/E			Palumata
pmd			I/E			Pallanganmiddang
pme			I/L			Pwaamei
pmf			I/L			Pamona
pmh			I/H	Indo-European	𑀫𑀳𑀸𑀭𑀸𑀱𑁆𑀝𑁆𑀭𑀻	Māhārāṣṭri Prākrit
pmi			I/L	Sino-Tibetan		Northern Pumi
pmj			I/L	Sino-Tibetan		Southern Pumi
(pmk)			I/E			Pamlico
pml			I/E			Lingua Franca
pmm			I/L			Pomo
pmn			I/L			Pam
pmo			I/L			Pom
pmq			I/L			Northern Pame
pmr			I/L			Paynamar
pms			I/L		piemontèis	Piemontese
pmt			I/L			Tuamotuan
(pmu)			I/L			Mirpur Panjabi
pmw			I/L			Plains Miwok
pmx			I/L			Poumei Naga
pmy			I/L			Papuan Malay
pmz			I/E			Southern Pame
pna			I/L			Punan Bah-Biau
pnb			I/L	Indo-European	پنجابی	Western Panjabi
pnc			I/L			Pannei
pnd			I/L			Mpinda
pne			I/L			Western Penan
png			I/L			Pangu; Pongu
pnh			I/L			Penrhyn
pni			I/L			Aoheng
pnj			I/E			Pinjarup
pnk			I/L			Paunaka
pnl			I/L	Niger–Congo		Paleni
pnm			I/L			Punan Batu 1
pnn			I/L			Pinai-Hagahai
pno			I/E			Panobo
pnp			I/L			Pancana
pnq			I/L			Pana (Burkina Faso)
pnr			I/L			Panim
pns			I/L			Ponosakan
pnt			I/L		Ποντιακά	Pontic
pnu			I/L			Jiongnai Bunu
pnv			I/L			Pinigura
pnw			I/L			Banyjima; Panytyima
pnx			I/L			Phong-Kniang
pny			I/L			Pinyin
pnz			I/L			Pana (Central African Republic)
(poa)			I/L			Eastern Pokomam
(pob)			I/L			Western Pokomchí
poc			I/L			Poqomam
(pod)			I/E	spurious language		Ponares
poe			I/L			San Juan Atzingo Popoloca
pof			I/L			Poke
pog			I/E			Potiguára
poh			I/L			Poqomchi'
poi			I/L			Highland Popoluca
(poj)			I/L			Lower Pokomo
pok			I/L			Pokangá
pol	pl	pol	I/L	Indo-European	polski	Polish
pom			I/L			Southeastern Pomo
pon		pon	I/L			Pohnpeian
poo			I/E			Central Pomo
pop			I/L			Pwapwâ
poq			I/L			Texistepec Popoluca
por	pt	por	I/L	Indo-European	português	Portuguese
pos			I/L			Sayula Popoluca
pot			I/L		Neshnabémwen (Bodéwadmimwen)	Potawatomi
(pou)			I/L			Southern Pokomam
pov			I/L			Upper Guinea Crioulo
pow			I/L			San Felipe Otlaltepec Popoloca
pox			I/E			Polabian
poy			I/L			Pogolo
(ppa)			I/L			Pao
ppe			I/L			Papi
ppi			I/L		aka'ala	Paipai
ppk			I/L			Uma
ppl			I/L			Nicarao; Pipil
ppm			I/L			Papuma
ppn			I/L			Papapana
ppo			I/L			Folopa
ppp			I/L			Pelende
ppq			I/L			Pei
(ppr)			I/L			Piru
pps			I/L			San Luís Temalacayuca Popoloca
ppt			I/L			Pare
ppu			I/E			Papora
(ppv)			I/L	spurious language		Papavô
pqa			I/L			Pa'a
pqm			I/L		Peskotomuhkati	Malecite-Passamaquoddy
(prb)			I/L	spurious language		Lua'
prc			I/L			Parachi
prd			I/L		(فارسی (دری	Parsi-Dari
pre			I/L			Principense
prf			I/L			Paranan
prg			I/L		Prūsiska	Prussian
prh			I/L			Porohanon
pri			I/L			Paicî
prk			I/L			Parauk
prl			I/L			Peruvian Sign Language
prm			I/L			Kibiri
prn			I/L			Prasuni
pro		pro	I/H	Indo-European	proensals ancian	Old Occitan (to 1500); Old Provençal (to 1500)
(prp)			I/L	spurious language	فارسی	Parsi
prq			I/L			Ashéninka Perené
prr			I/E			Puri
prs			I/L		(فارسی (دری	Afghan Persian; Dari
prt			I/L			Phai
pru			I/L			Puragi
(prv)			I/L			Provençal
prw			I/L			Parawen
prx			I/L			Purik
(pry)			I/L			Pray 3
prz			I/L			Providencia Sign Language
psa			I/L			Asue Awyu
psc			I/L			Iranian Sign Language; Persian Sign Language
psd			I/L			Plains Indian Sign Language
pse			I/L			Central Malay
psg			I/L			Penang Sign Language
psh			I/L			Southwest Pashai; Southwest Pashayi
psi			I/L			Southeast Pashai; Southeast Pashayi
psl			I/L			Puerto Rican Sign Language
psm			I/E			Pauserna
psn			I/L			Panasuan
pso			I/L			Polish Sign Language
psp			I/L			Philippine Sign Language
psq			I/L			Pasi
psr			I/L			Portuguese Sign Language
pss			I/L			Kaulong
pst			I/L			Central Pashto
psu			I/H	Indo-European	𑀰𑁅𑀭𑀲𑁂𑀦𑀻	Sauraseni Prākrit
psw			I/L			Port Sandwich
psy			I/E			Piscataway
pta			I/L			Pai Tavytera
pth			I/E	Macro-Jê	Hahaháy	Pataxó Hã-Ha-Hãe
pti			I/L			Pindiini; Wangkatha
ptn			I/L			Patani
pto			I/L			Zo'é
ptp			I/L			Patep
ptq			I/L	Dravidian		Pattapu
ptr			I/L			Piamatsina
ptt			I/L			Enrekang
ptu			I/L			Bambam
ptv			I/L			Port Vato
ptw			I/E			Pentlatch
pty			I/L	Dravidian		Pathiya
pua			I/L			Western Highland Purepecha
pub			I/L			Purum
puc			I/L			Punan Merap
pud			I/L			Punan Aput
pue			I/E			Puelche
puf			I/L			Punan Merah
pug			I/L			Phuie
pui			I/L			Puinave
puj			I/L			Punan Tubu
(puk)			I/L	spurious language		Pu Ko
pum			I/L			Puma
(pun)			I/L			Pubian
puo			I/L			Puoc
pup			I/L			Pulabu
puq			I/E			Puquina
pur			I/L			Puruborá
pus	ps	pus	M/L	Indo-European	پښتو	Pashto; Pushto
put			I/L			Putoh
puu			I/L			Punu
puw			I/L			Puluwatese
pux			I/L			Puare
puy			I/E			Purisimeño
(puz)			I/L			Purum Naga
pwa			I/L			Pawaia
pwb			I/L	Niger–Congo?	Bujiyel	Panawa
pwg			I/L			Gapapaiwa
pwi			I/E			Patwin
pwm			I/L			Molbog
pwn			I/L			Paiwan
pwo			I/L			Pwo Western Karen
pwr			I/L			Powari
pww			I/L			Pwo Northern Karen
pxm			I/L			Quetzaltepec Mixe
pye			I/L			Pye Krumen
pym			I/L			Fyam
pyn			I/L			Poyanáwa
pys			I/L			Lengua de Señas del Paraguay; Paraguayan Sign Language
pyu			I/L			Puyuma
pyx			I/H	Sino-Tibetan		Pyu (Myanmar)
pyy			I/L			Pyen
pze			I/L	Afro-Asiatic		Pesse
pzh			I/L	Austronesian		Pazeh
pzn			I/L	Sino-Tibetan	Jaijairai	Jejara Naga; Para Naga

== Sources ==
- "ISO 639-2 Registration Authority". Library of Congress.
- "ISO 639-3 Registration Authority". SIL International.
- Lewis, M. Paul; Simons, Gary F.; Fennig, Charles D., eds. (2016). "Ethnologue: Languages of the World" (19th ed.). Dallas, Texas: SIL International.
