= Poqomam =

Poqomam may refer to:

- Poqomam people, an ethnic subgroup of the Maya
- Poqomam language, the language spoken by that people
