= Coyotepec Municipality =

Coyotepec may refer to one of several locations in Mexico:

- Coyotepec, State of Mexico
- Coyotepec, Puebla
- San Bartolo Coyotepec, Oaxaca
- Santa María Coyotepec, Oaxaca

See also

- Coyotepec Popoloca language, found in Puebla
