= Mixco Viejo =

Archaeological site in Guatemala

Coordinates: 14°52′18″N 90°39′51″W

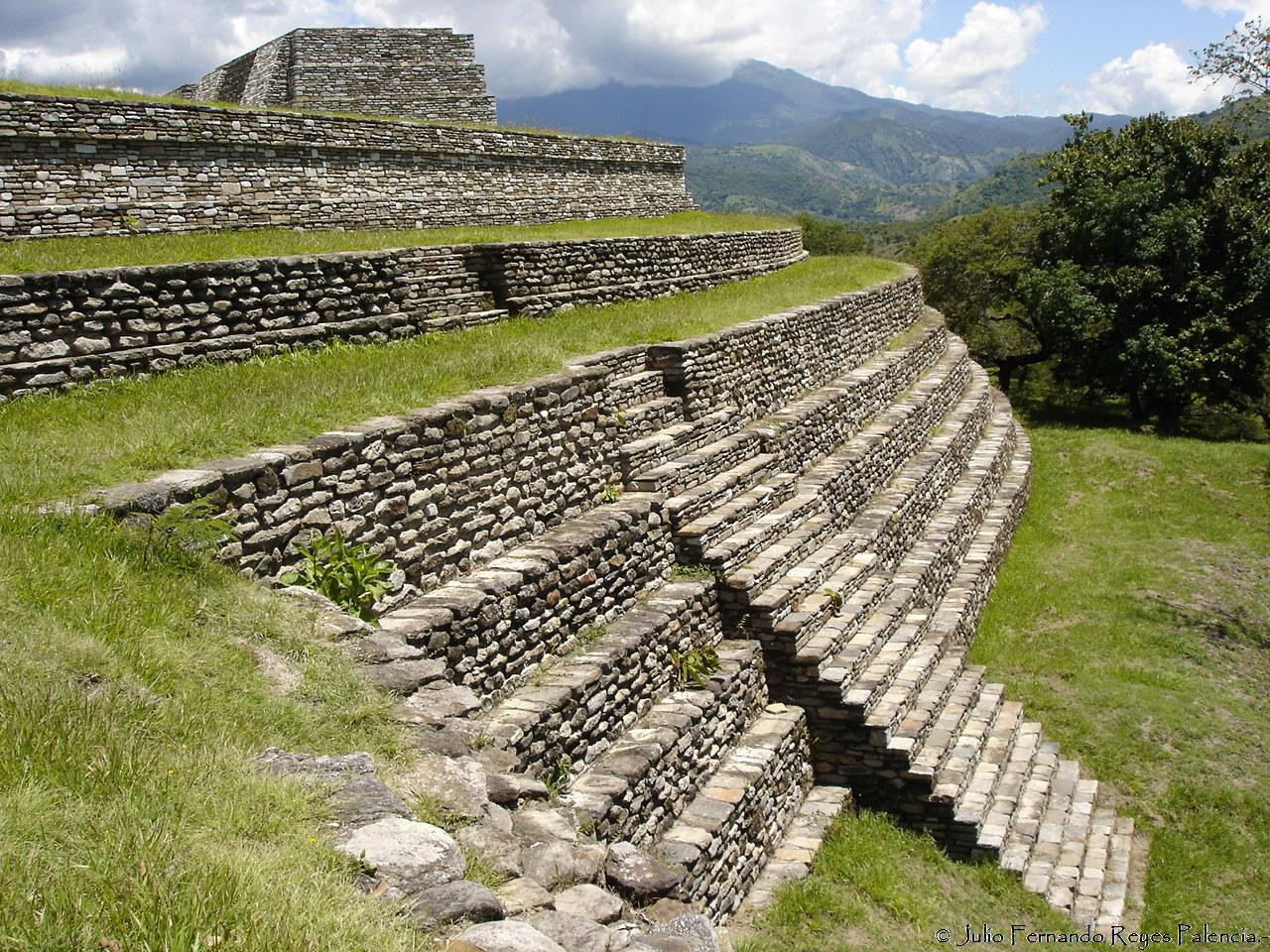
- Outer wall of Group B of Mixco Viejo (Jilotepeque Viejo)

- Location in Guatemala (Chimaltenango)
- Type: Archaeological site
- Periods: Postclassic
- Cultures: Chajoma Maya
- Location: San Martín Jilotepeque, Chimaltenango
- Region: Mesoamerica

History
- Built: 12th c.
- Abandoned: 1525

Site notes
- Excavation dates: 1954–1967
- Condition: In ruins
- Current use: Archaeological site

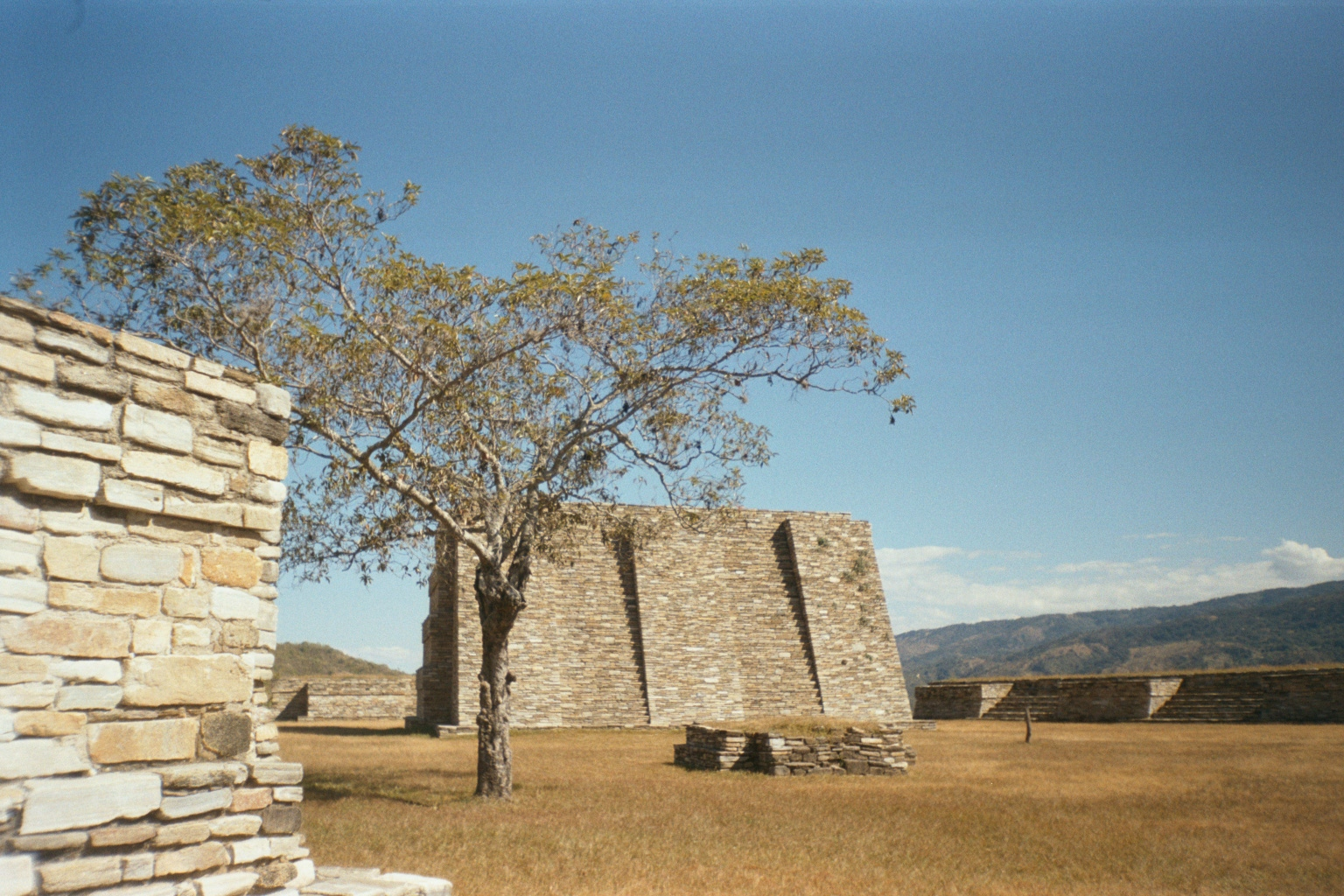
View of Group A of Mixco Viejo (Jilotepeque Viejo)

Mixco Viejo (Spanish pronunciation: [ˈmisko ˈβieχo]) ("Old Mixco"), occasionally called Jilotepeque Viejo, is an archaeological site in the north east of the Chimaltenango department of Guatemala, some 50 kilometres (31 mi) to the north of Guatemala City and 4 kilometres (2.5 mi) from the junction of the rivers Pixcaya and Motagua. It is a moderate sized ruined city of the Postclassic Maya civilization.

The archaeological site and tourist attraction of Mixco Viejo was named after being erroneously associated with the Postclassic Poqomam capital referred to in colonial records by that name. The archaeological site has now been identified as Jilotepeque Viejo, the capital of the Chajoma kingdom. To distinguish between the two, the ruins of the Chajoma capital are now referred to as Mixco Viejo (Jilotepeque Viejo) while the former Poqomam capital is referred to as Mixco Viejo (Chinautla Viejo).

This confusion in the identification of the site has hindered study. The Chajoma capital has been investigated archaeologically, under the assumption that it was the Poqomam capital. Although the Chajoma ruins of Jilotepeque Viejo have been well described archaeologically, the archaeological data has been associated with the history of a different site entirely. Doubts about the identification of the archaeological site were first raised by Robert M. Carmack, who realised that the supposed Poqomam capital was not located within the Poqomam linguistic area but rather within the linguistic area of the Kaqchikels. The Poqomam who were settled in the new colonial settlement of Mixco by the Spanish had a long history of fine polychrome ceramic production, but no evidence of such production had been recovered during archaeological investigations, and the ruins were considered too distant from colonial Mixco.

Chinautla Viejo was attacked by the invading Spanish in 1525; the first two attacks against the heavily fortified city were unsuccessful. The besieged city received Poqomam reinforcements that were comprehensively defeated on an open field of battle, with the Spanish cavalry being decisive. The capture of Poqomam prisoners allowed the Spanish to discover the location of a cave providing a secret entrance to the city. A third assault broke the month-long siege, allowing the Spanish to take the city. The surviving inhabitants were moved to another settlement and Pedro de Alvarado ordered the city to be burned.

Jilotepeque Viejo was settled by the Chajoma in order to provide a capital that was safer from attack from the hostile Iximche Kaqchikel kingdom than their previous capital. In spite of this, the city fell under the domination of Iximche and the city's architecture, spread in a number of fortified groups along a ridge surrounded by deep ravines, shows a mixture of Chajoma and Kaqchikel styles. At the time of the Spanish conquest, the Chajoma of Jilotepeque Viejo may have initially allied themselves with the Spanish together with Iximche and have joined in the general Kaqchikel uprising against the Spanish in 1524. The site was abandoned after the conquest and never reoccupied.

== Mixco Viejo in history: Chinautla Viejo ==
The historical Mixco Viejo has been identified as Chinautla Viejo ("Old Chinautla"), near the modern town of Mixco. Mixco Viejo ("Old Mixco") was the capital of the Poqomam Maya kingdom, and was founded on a defensive mountain-top location in the 12th century AD. The peak population in the early 16th century may have been around 10,000 people.

In 1525 Pedro de Alvarado sent a small company to conquer Mixco Viejo (Chinautla Viejo), the capital of the Poqomam. At the Spanish approach, the inhabitants remained enclosed in the fortified city. The Spanish attempted an approach from the west through a narrow pass but were forced back with heavy losses. Alvarado himself launched the second assault with 200 Tlaxcalan allies but was also beaten back. The Poqomam then received reinforcements, possibly from Chinautla, and the two armies clashed on open ground outside of the city. The battle was chaotic and lasted for most of the day but was finally decided by the Spanish cavalry, forcing the Poqomam reinforcements to withdraw. The leaders of the reinforcements surrendered to the Spanish three days after their retreat and revealed that the city had a secret entrance in the form of a cave leading up from a nearby river, allowing the inhabitants to come and go.

Armed with the knowledge gained from their prisoners, Alvarado sent 40 men to cover the exit from the cave and launched another assault along the ravine from the west, in single file owing to its narrowness, with crossbowmen alternating with soldiers bearing muskets, each with a companion sheltering him from arrows and stones with a shield. This tactic allowed the Spanish to break through the pass and storm the entrance of the city. The Poqomam warriors fell back in disorder in a chaotic retreat through the city, and were hunted down by the victorious conquistadors and their Mesoamerican allies. Those who managed to retreat down the neighbouring valley were ambushed by Spanish cavalry who had been posted to block the exit from the cave, the survivors were captured and brought back to the city. The siege had lasted more than a month and because of the defensive strength of the city, Alvarado ordered it to be burned and moved the inhabitants to the new colonial village of Mixco.

== Archaeological site: Jilotepeque Viejo ==
Mixco Viejo (Jilotepeque Viejo)
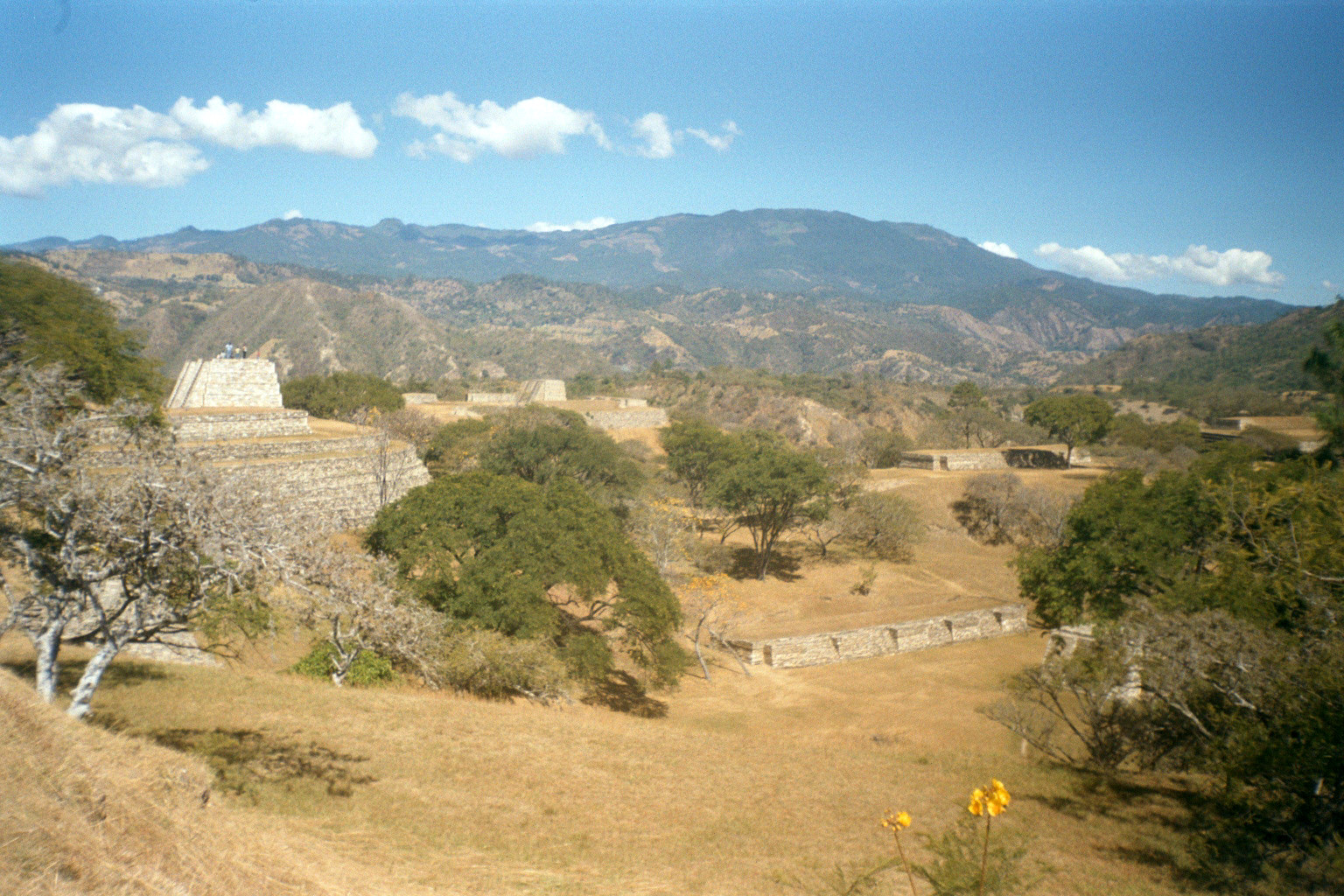
- View of Mixco Viejo, including Groups B at left, B-X at bottom right, Group A in the distance and Group D extending at centre right
- Interactive map of Mixco Viejo (Jilotepeque Viejo)
- Cultures: Chajoma Maya
- Location: San Juan Sacatepéquez
- Region: Chimaltenango Department, Guatemala

History
- Built: Postclassic Period
- Abandoned: c.1521 AD

Site notes
- Architectural style: Postclassic Maya
- Excavation dates: 1954–1967
- Archaeologists: Henri Lehmann IDAEH, CNRS
- Restored by Henri Lehmann and Francisco Ferrus Roig (1954–1967) Responsible body: IDAEH

Although the site now known as Mixco Viejo was traditionally considered the Poqomam capital, recent investigations have instead identified the ruins as the capital of the Kaqchikel-speaking Chajoma Maya, and have suggested that its identification as the historical Mixco Viejo is the result of confusion in the interpretation of colonial records. The site was apparently known to the Chajoma by a variety of names, including Chuapec Kekacajol Nima Abaj (also spelt Chuwa Pek Q'eqak'ajol Nima Ab'aj), meaning "Great stone in front of the Cave of the Children of Night", Zakicajol and Nimcakajpec. Jilotepeque Viejo is estimated to have had a population of approximately 1,500 inhabitants. Jilotepeque was close to the San Martín Jilotepeque obsidian source, giving the inhabitants ready access to the resource.

The site is open to the public and has a small museum. The site was declared a protected archaeological zone by Ministerial Accord 1210 of the Guatemalan Ministry of Education on 12 June 1970.

=== Location ===
The ruins are situated at the northeastern extreme of the department of Chimaltenango within the municipality of San Martín Jilotepeque; they are strung out over 1 kilometre (0.62 mi) along a 880-metre (2,890 ft) high ridge approximately 4 kilometres (2.5 mi) from the point where the Pixcaya River flows into the Motagua River, which drains into the Caribbean Sea. The ruins are surrounded by deep ravines dropping off sharply into a tributary of the Pixcaya River. The site is 53.3 kilometres (33.1 mi) from Guatemala City by road.

=== History ===
==== Known rulers ====
All dates are approximate.

Name	Ruled	Alternative names
Lajuj No'j	c.1450–c.1480	Ichalkan Chi Kumkwat, Ychal Amollac Chicumcuat
Achi Q'alel	early 16th century	–

==== Postclassic ====
Around 1450 the Chajoma, led by their king Lajuj No'j, (Note: Lajuj No'j was his name in Kaqchikel. He was also known by the Nahuatl name Ichalkan Chi Kumkwat. Carmack 2001, p.153.) moved to Mixco Viejo (Jilotepeque Viejo) from Ochal to make their capital more inaccessible to their hostile neighbours. In spite of this, Iximche defeated the Chajoma and Jilotepeque Viejo became subject to the Kaqchikel kingdom. Groups C and E show Kaqchikel influence in their architectural styles, while groups A and B have a purer Chajoma architectural style. Both ballcourts appear to have been remodelled after the Kaqchikel fashion, with thick coatings of stucco.

Around the 13th century, Group A underwent a major remodelling, including the construction of a new retaining wall and the infilling of the 12-metre (39 ft) wide area between the old and new walls, creating a much expanded terrace for the construction of the group's architecture. Owing to its possession of two ballcourts, it is possible that Jilotepeque Viejo served as a regional centre for the Mesoamerican ballgame during the Postclassic; no other Postclassic ballcourt has been identified in the area of San Martín Jilotepeque although three of four Classic period ballcourts at other sites appear to have continued in use. Shortly before the Spanish Conquest, the Chajoma under their lord Achi Q'alel rebelled against the Kaqchikels of Iximche.

It is possible that the Chajoma of Mixco Viejo (Jilotepeque Viejo) initially allied themselves with the Spanish together with the Kaqchikel kingdom of Iximche, and that they also rebelled against the Spanish in 1524. It is known that when the lords of Iximche broke their alliance with the conquistadors, they took refuge in Jilotepeque. The site was abandoned after the Spanish conquest and the inhabitants were moved by the Spanish to San Martín Jilotepeque, after which the area was never reoccupied.

==== Modern history ====
German geographer Karl Sapper visited the ruins in 1896 and published a brief description of the ruins together with a site map two years later in a 6-page pamphlet by the Internationales Archiv für Ethnographie of Leyden in the Netherlands, entitled Die Ruinen von Mixco, Guatemala. It was Sapper who labelled each of the archaeological groups and their attendant structures. American archaeologist A. Ledyard Smith visited the ruins in 1949 and wrote a chapter about the site in his Archaeological Reconnaissance in Central America, published by the Carnegie Institution of Washington in 1955. Archeological excavations were carried out from 1954 through 1967 by the Musée de l'Homme of Paris under the direction of archaeologist Henri Lehmann, who certainly believed that he was excavating the Pocomam capital as described in Colonial records.

Although the site was restored during the archaeological investigations, it suffered considerable damage in the 1976 Guatemala earthquake. This resulted in destruction of some of the restoration work, although some of the damage has now been repaired.

=== Site description ===
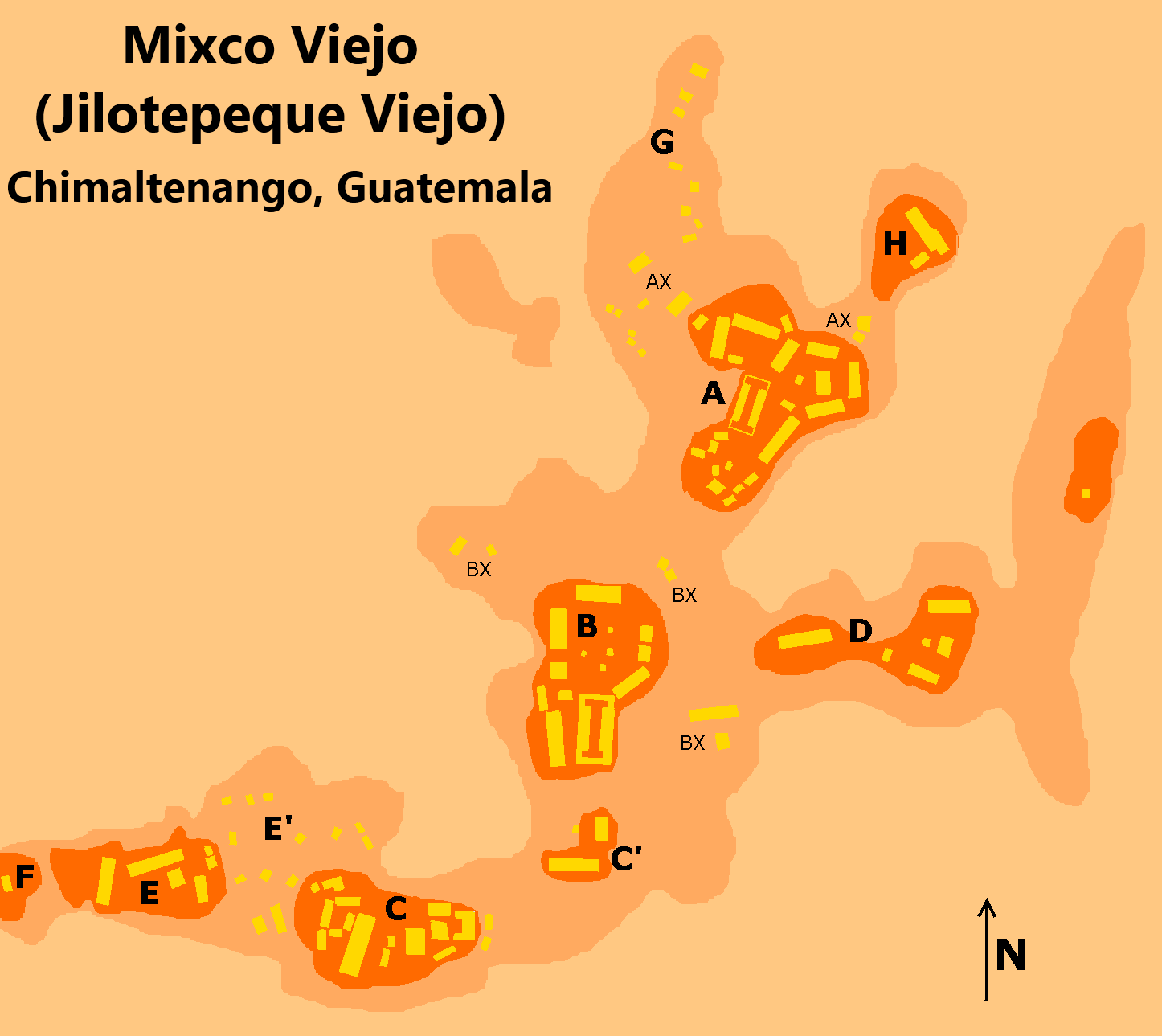
Map of the ruins of Mixco Viejo (Jilotepeque Viejo)

The ruins consist of 15 groups containing the remains of over 120 major structures, including temples, palaces, and courts for playing the Mesoamerican ballgame. When the site was excavated, the surface was found to be littered with abundant obsidian blades and arrowheads. Originally the city had its main entrance on the western side, a modern road has now been cut through to the ruins from the west along a similar route.

The relatively short period of occupation at Mixco Viejo (Jilotepeque Viejo) led to an unusual unity of architectural styles for a Mesoamerican city. Almost all archaeological finds at the city, including both artefacts and earlier versions of later structures, date to the last few hundred years before the Spanish conquest. The architecture was built with mica and pumice slabs, in some cases this was coated with stucco. Stone sculpture is almost totally absent from the city, the only example being a ballcourt marker in the form of a serpent's head with jaws agape and a human head emerging from its mouth. Originally some buildings were decorated with painted stucco but this is so poorly preserved that only a few fragments remain.

A population estimate derived from the number of residential remains suggests that the city had approximately 1450 to 1600 inhabitants.

==== Architectural groups ====
The architecture is divided into a number of groups and subgroups, labelled by archaeologists as Groups A through to L; those subgroups belonging to Groups A, B, C and E that fall outside the city walls are indicated with the addition of an X or an apostrophe after the group name, to give Group A-X, Group B-X, Group C' and Group E'.

===== Group A =====
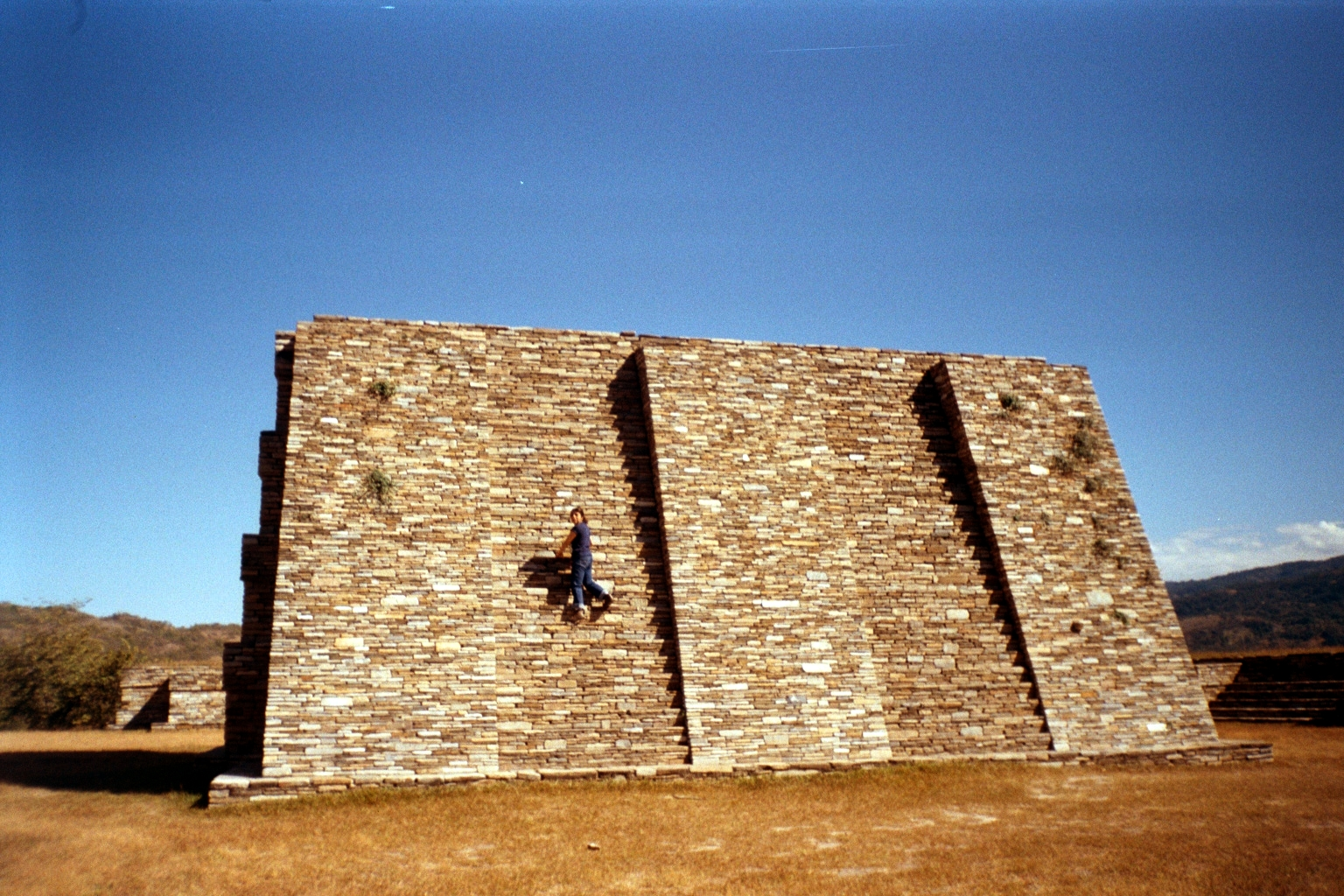
Pyramid A1, one of the principal structures of Group A

Group A is located on the northern end of the ridge. The group was extended during major remodelling work that included the building of the final versions of Platforms A2 and A3 on the north side; this involved building a new retaining wall some 12 metres (39 ft) further north, east and southeast and filling in the area between the new and old walls to create a greatly expanded terrace. Traces of charcoal at the base of the old retaining wall have been radiocarbon dated to the 13th century, indicating that the expansion of Group A took place no earlier than that.

Pyramid A1 is one of the principal structures of Group A, together with the ballcourt. The pyramid is 6.9 metres (23 ft) high and measures 15.4 by 7.25 metres (50.5 by 23.8 ft) at the base. It was built using cut stone and has four stepped levels, each of which terminates in a cornice. The pyramid faces west onto the plaza and has two access stairways with 27 steps each. The stairways are flanked by smooth balustrades built from well-fitted slabs. The summit of the pyramid supports a 60-centimetre (24 in) high platform that once formed the base for the summit temple. The pyramid was built over another structure, a stucco platform with two levels, the upper of which terminated in a cornice.

Platform A2 is built along the edge of the retaining wall behind Pyramid A1. It faces west towards the pyramid and has two access stairways. Three successive versions of the platform were built, each overlying the previous. The earliest version sat upon the early retaining wall, as did the second version. The final version was much larger and was built after the new retaining wall had extended the available area for Group A.

Platform A3 encloses the north side of the eastern part of the Group A plaza. It faces south onto the plaza and was accessed via two stairways on that side. The platform was built over an earlier structure that was built on top of an early tiered retaining wall; the earlier structure extended 1.27 metres (4.2 ft) above the retaining wall. The final version extended 4 metres (13 ft) further to the west and 2 metres (6.6 ft) further to the north. It had two levels, each terminating in a cornice. On the north side a 1-metre (3.3 ft) wide bench extends along the base of the wall.

Platform A4 divides the Group A plaza in two. It was a later addition to Group A during the reorganisation of the group that involved the destruction of the earlier building under Platform A5. When excavated it was very poorly reserved but was able to be reliably restored. There was no earlier version of the structure; it consists of a platform with two levels that faces east towards the principal architecture of Group A. The upper level is topped with a cornice and access was via two stairways flanked by balustrades.

Platform A5 closes the north side of the Group A plaza. The platform has two levels upon a base and a cornice terminating the walls. The platform faces south towards the plaza and ballcourt. The platform was accessed via four stairways, each with nine steps; they were flanked by steep ramps or balustrades. The visible version of Platform A5 covers the remains of an earlier structure. The earlier building was a large platform with a north-south orientation as opposed to the east-west orientation of Platform A5. The surviving parts were investigated by archaeologists and consist of the north wall and parts of the west facade. The north wall was 9.1 metres (30 ft) wide, suggesting that the earlier platform was very large and probably extended south almost as far as the ballcourt. Two funerary urns were excavated from the earlier platform.

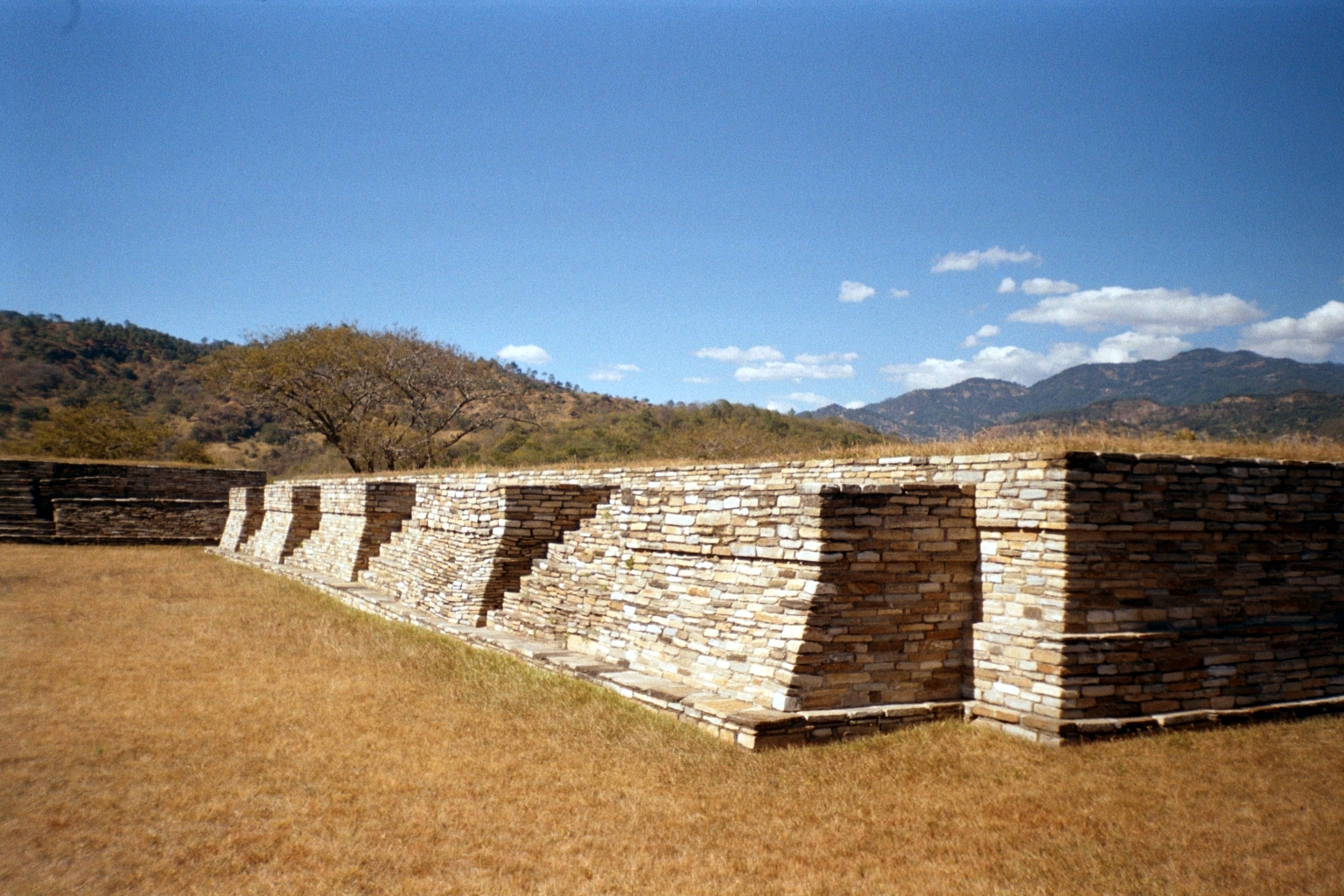
Platform A5, with Platform A6 behind

Platform A6 encloses the western extreme of the Group A plaza. The platform has two levels, the upper of which has a vertical cornice. The platform faces east onto the plaza; access was via two stairways flanked by balustrades terminating in vertical cornices. Platform A6 was built over an older version of the same building; this earlier construction phase was smaller and its stairways were destroyed in order to build the stairways of the final version. During restoration work carried out by archaeologists the back wall and a section of the facade were left exposed. Four funerary urns were found associated with the platform, mostly interred under the front of the building.

Structure A7 is a small square altar in the middle of the eastern part of the Group A plaza. It faces west with steps on that side.

Platform A8 is to the east of Pyramid A1, on the eastern side of the Group A plaza. It faces northwest towards the pyramid and had two access stairways. Behind the platform was a finely paved terrace extending along the edge of the retaining wall.

Platform A9 is to the east of the ballcourt (A11) and faces towards it. It had four access stairways set between corniced balustrades; each stairway had nine steps.

Ballcourt A11 encloses the west side of the Group A plaza, separating it from the retaining wall dropping off to the ravine behind the ballcourt. It is a sunken ballcourt with a north-south orientation and is entirely enclosed. A short sunken stairway leads from the plaza to the top of the south wall. Another stairway descends the south wall to the southern end zone of the ballcourt. A matching stairway in the northern end zone provides access from that direction. The interior of the ballcourt playing area measures 37.21 metres (122.1 ft) north-south and the playing alley is 9.46 metres (31.0 ft) wide between the side benches. The walls were built of small stone slabs and have a slight slope; as is common with the architecture of Mixco Viejo (Jilotepeque Viejo), the walls were topped with vertical cornices. However, the end zone walls are all completely vertical. Fragments of stucco recovered around the ballcourt indicate that it was at least partly coated.

Structure A12 was a residential structure on the southwest side of the Group A plaza between the ballcourt and Platform A6. All that remains of this structure is its outline marked in stones.

Structure A14 was a residential structure immediately northeast of Platform A5.

Structures A31 and A32 were residential structures near platform A5 on the north side of the Group A plaza.

===== Group A-X =====
Group A-X defines a number of structures in two subgroups lying outside the walls of Group A, to the northeast and northwest of the main group.

===== Group B =====
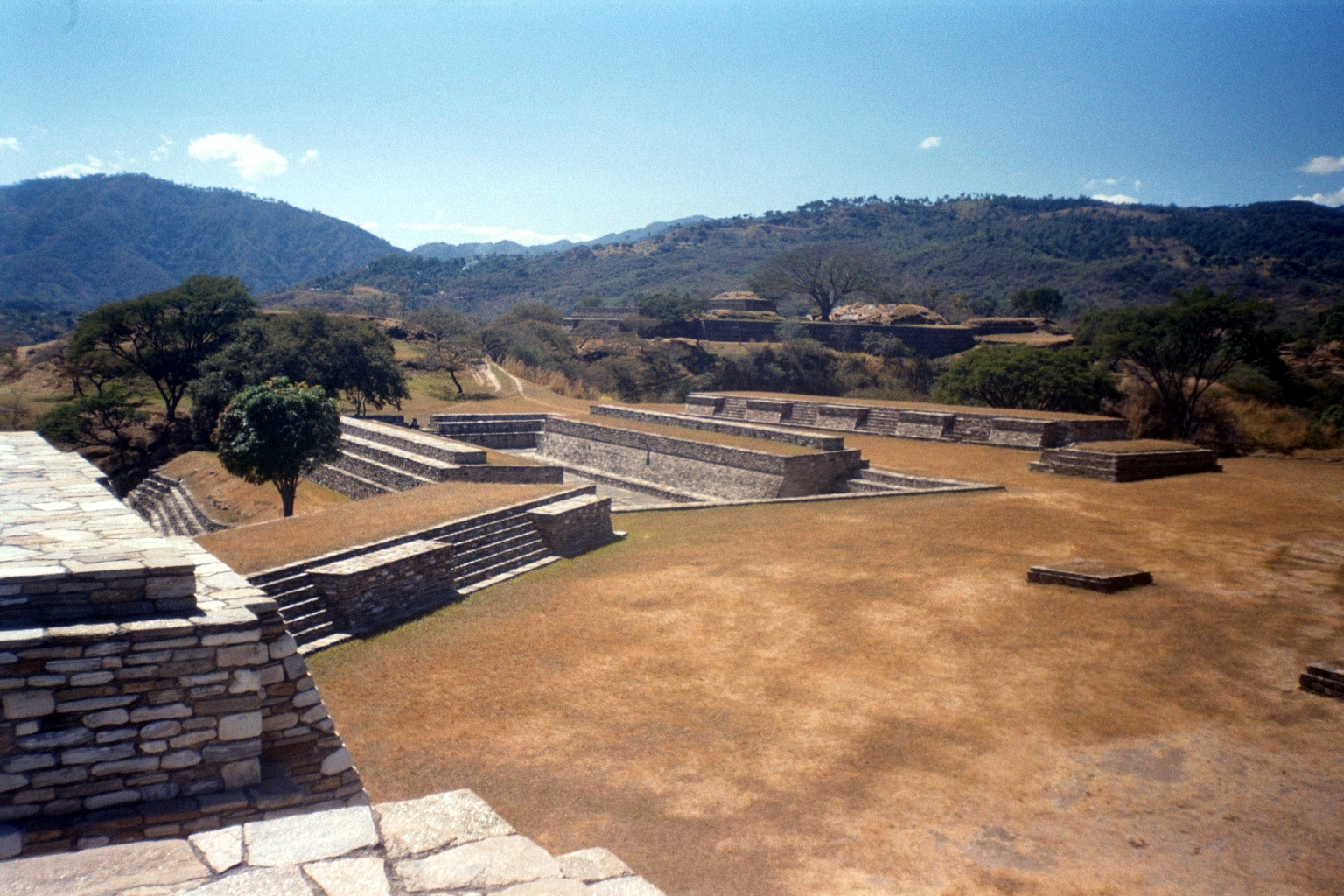
View across the Group B plaza to Ballcourt B1 and Platform B8; double pyramid B3 is at bottom left and Platform B2 at left; Group C is visible beyond Platform B8.

Group B is near the centre of the site, roughly equidistant between Group A (to the northeast) and Group C (to the southwest). The main plaza of Group B was at the northern end of the group and was enclosed by the ballcourt on the south side, a double pyramid on the east side and three platforms. A stairway with 28 steps descends the Group B retaining wall behind the northeast corner of the double pyramid, providing an access route towards Group D. On the north side of the group another stairway, with 18 steps divided into two flights, descends towards Group A.

Ballcourt B1 is immediately south of the Group B plaza, with the northern entrance to the ballcourt directly accessing the plaza itself. It is an enclosed sunken ballcourt, as was common in the Maya highlands during the Late Postclassic. The ballcourt is aligned north-south with two transverse end zones forming a capital I shape. The ballcourt has two entrances in the form of inset stairways in the end zones, in the centre of the ballcourt's north and south walls. The side walls of the playing alley are slightly sloped and are topped by a cornice; the playing alley is flanked by two low benches set against the east and west walls. The end zones also possess sloping walls. All the ballcourt walls were built of large stones. The ballcourt playing area measures 44.5 metres (146 ft) north-south and is 9 metres (30 ft) wide between the benches. The end zones measure 17.46 metres (57.3 ft) east-west. The ballcourt was originally coated in stucco painted in a variety of colours; very little of this coating now remains. A drain opening empties runoff rainwater from the east side of the northern end zone; the drain continues under Platform B 2 and empties outside the retaining wall of Group B. During archaeological investigation of the ballcourt a well-preserved tenoned ballgame marker was found placed on the western bench. Its original placement was indicated by a hole in the upper part of the ballcourt wall. The second marker that would have been placed directly opposite the first has never been found and the area of the ballcourt wall where it would have been had collapsed prior to excavations. Replicas of the ballcourt marker have been placed in both walls; the original is in the Museo Nacional de Arqueología y Etnología in Guatemala City.

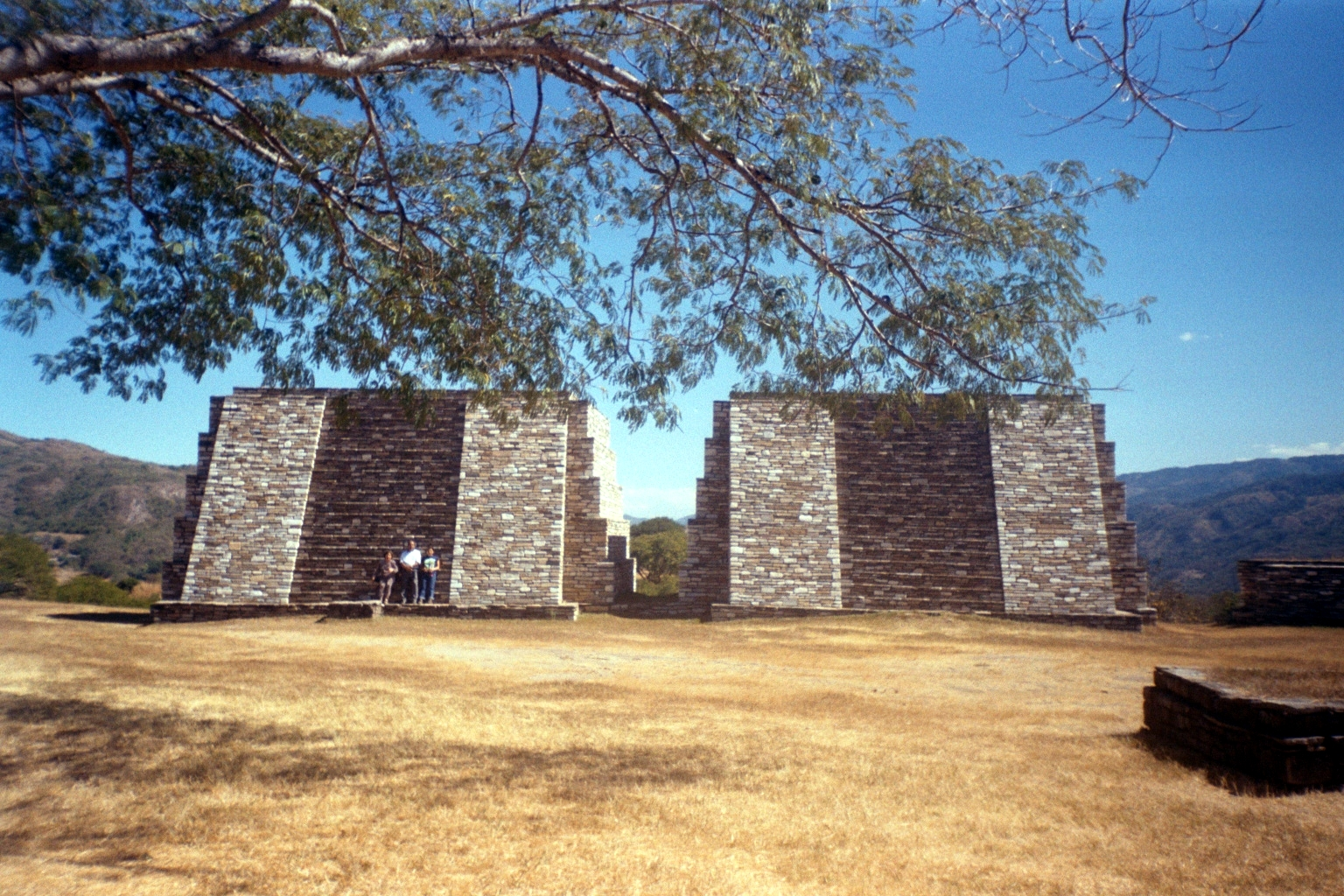
Twin pyramids B3

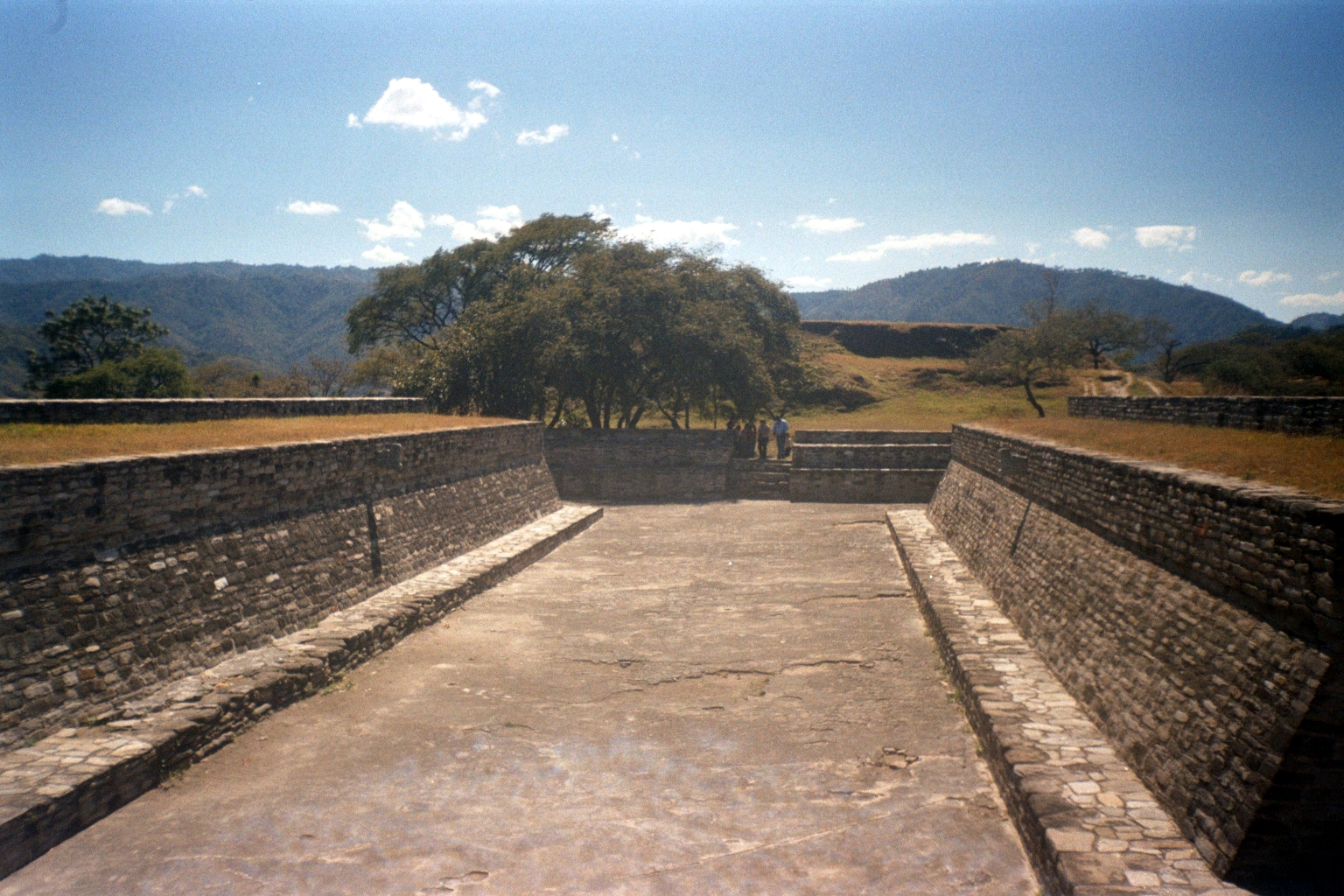
Playing alley of Ballcourt B1

Platform B2 is aligned northeast to southwest and faces northwest onto the Group B plaza. It had two access stairways flanked by steep balustrades topped with vertical cornices. Behind the platform two stairways descend Group B's retaining wall towards Group B-X.

Pyramid B3 is actually two pyramids built upon a single basal platform. Together they comprise the most important architectural unit in Group B. The northern pyramid of the pair is denominated B3a; the southern is B3b. The two pyramids each have five stepped levels and face west onto the plaza. Each pyramid was accessed by a single stairway flanked by wide balustrades; each had a small altar at the base of its stairway. Both stairways had nineteen steps and the pyramids stand 6.17 metres (20.2 ft) high. Low platforms on their summits indicate where the temple buildings once stood. The double form of the twin pyramids had its origin in the Valley of Mexico and indicates foreign influences at the city. A broken stela was excavated from within the fill of Pyramid B3a; it was a plain monument broken in two parts. The bottom section still stood, while the upper section was lying beside it. It is one of very few such monuments raised in the Maya highlands and such stelae are characteristic of the Classic Period (c. 250–900). It is possible that it stands where originally erected before the pyramid was built over it. A funerary urn was excavated from underneath the rear of Pyramid B3b.

A drain near the northeast corner of Pyramid B3 carries runoff rainwater from the Group B plaza and channels it outside the retaining wall to the area between Groups B and D.

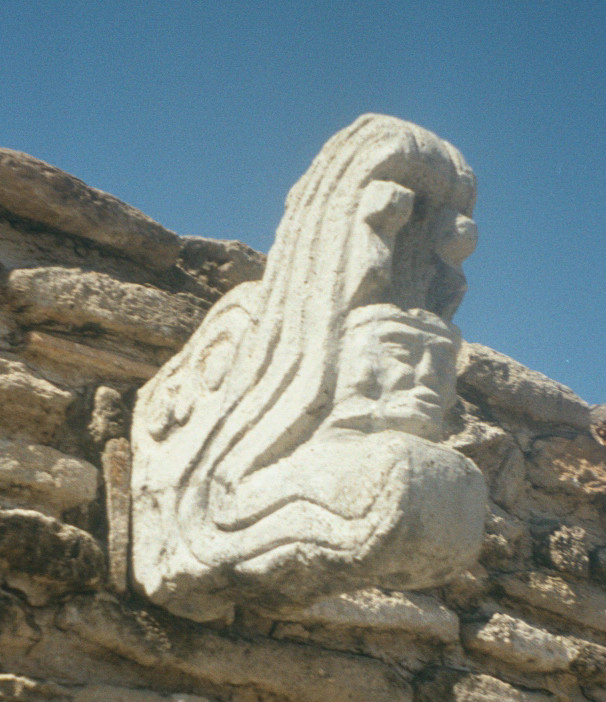
This ballcourt marker is the only example of stone sculpture recovered from Mixco Viejo (Jilotepeque Viejo)

Platform B4 encloses the north side of the Group B plaza. The platform consists of a single level set upon a base and possesses corniced walls. Access was via an inset stairway in the centre of the south side. The platform top was floored with slabs and possessed a low double terrace at the rear.

Platform B5 possesses two stepped levels with cornices and encloses the northern part of the west side of the Group B plaza. The lower level possesses a single inset stairway, while the upper terrace has two stairways flanked by balustrades, with a third balustrade dividing the two. The platform provides a broad view across the Pancaco River valley to the west. Structure B5 was built on top of an earlier construction phase, which is exposed along the upper portion of the back wall because restoration of the building only rebuilt the lower portion. It was built from stone slabs and was originally taller than the final version of the platform but was cut back to the reduced height of the new building.

Pyramid B6 enclosed the southern portion of the west side of the Group B plaza. It is very poorly preserved and the top of the pyramid has collapsed, leaving only the lower walls. Archaeological investigation revealed that the final version of the pyramid had been built over a preceding version.

Structure B7 was a small, well-proportioned rectangular structure south of the main Group A plaza, between the north end of the ballcourt (B1) to the east and Structure B9 to the west. This structure was likely to have been an altar shrine.

Platform B8 is a range structure on the west side of Group B. It consists of a basal platform supporting inward-sloping walls that terminate in a cornice. The building faces east and possesses four access stairways separated by near-vertical balustrades. The retaining wall of Group B drops away into the neighbouring ravine 2 metres (6.6 ft) behind Platform B8. A great number of funerary urns were excavated around the base of this platform.

===== Group B-X =====
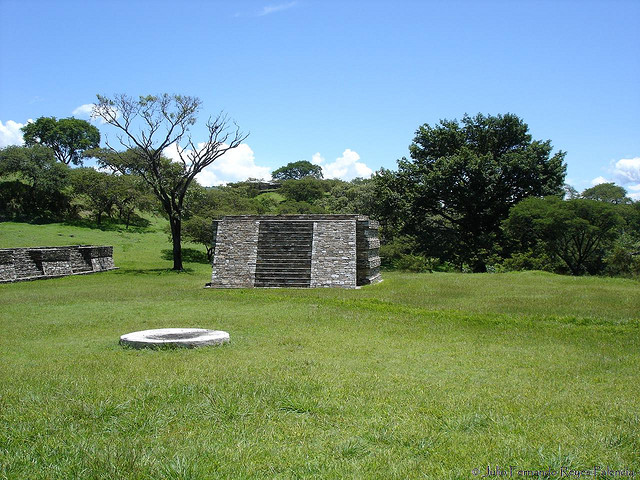
Temple B-X3

Group B-X includes a number of structures in three subgroups outside the walls of Group B; they are to the northwest, northeast and east of Group B itself.

Structure B-X3 is a step pyramid with sides so steep that it is almost cubic in shape. This temple platform would originally have supported a perishable superstructure but no trace of this now remains. The pyramid faces west and was accessed by an extremely steep stairway with fifteen steps that faces directly onto the massive 13-metre (43 ft) high retaining wall of Group B. The stairway is flanked by wide balustrades that form the western facade of the temple platform. Structure B-X3 has been restored.

Structure B-X4 has also been restored. It is a south-facing range structure with four inset access stairways.

===== Group C =====
Group C lies to the southwest of Group B and east of Group E. Group C is arranged around two large structures (C1 and C2). It possesses two small plazas; the East Plaza is the larger of the two, enclosing an area to the east of the main temple, Pyramid C1. The East Plaza was accessed via a narrow alley that ran between a large, low platform and a high-status residential structure with a patio (C8). An inset stairway climbed outside of the retaining wall of Group C and accessed the East Plaza between the high-status residence and a platform to its east. The West Plaza is located behind Platform C2 and is enclosed to the north by three platforms (C9, C10 and C17).

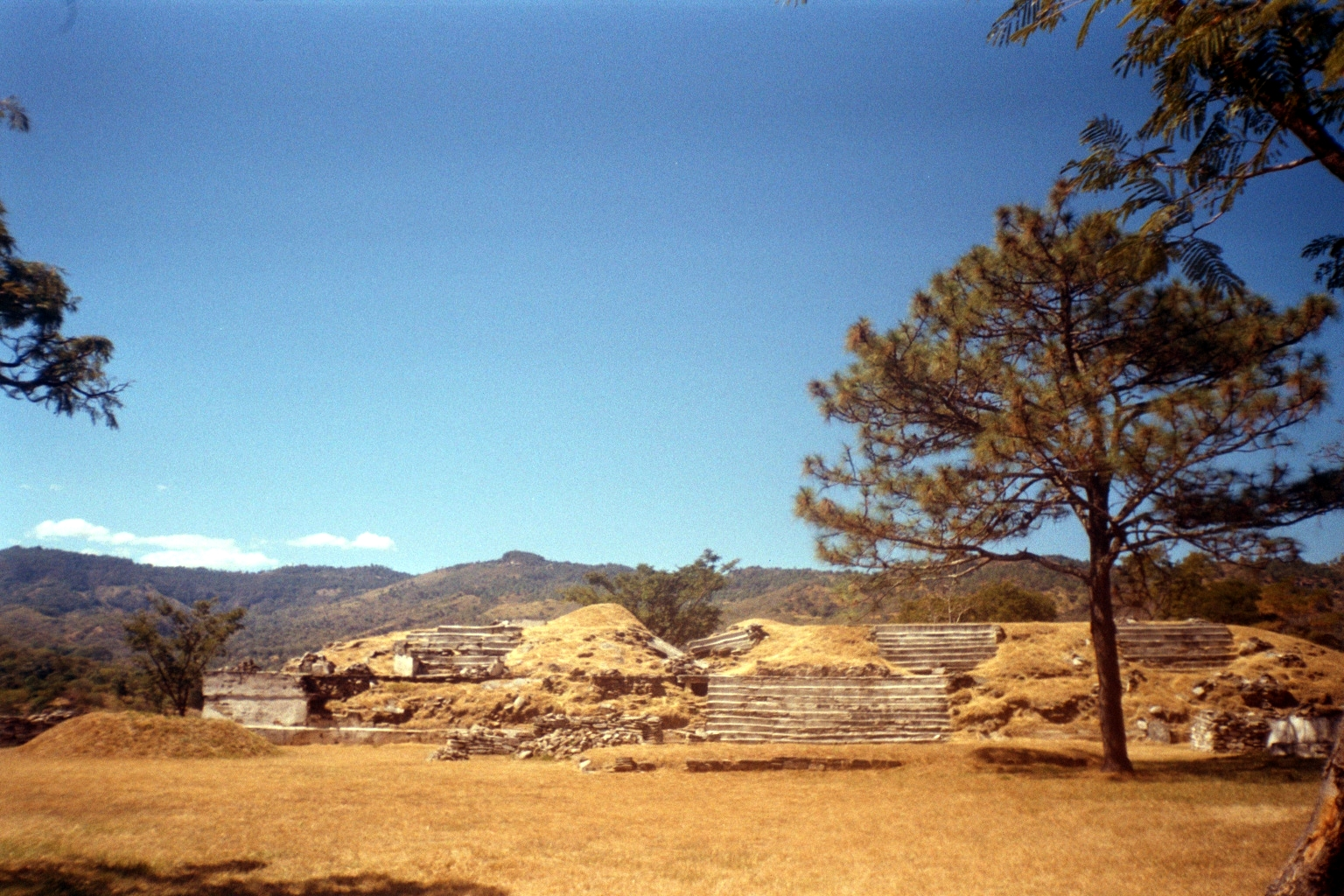
Platform C2

Pyramid C1 is the principal structure in Group C. Archaeological investigation uncovered three versions of the pyramid, each built over the last. The archaeologists restored the pyramid in such a way as to make a part of each of the three construction phases visible. The first phase of construction consisted of a platform of cut pumice blocks. This was buried under the second construction phase, which consisted of a five-level stepped pyramid. It had a double stairway on the west side; each stairway had 16 steps. The stairways were flanked and separated by ramps that terminated in sizeable masonry blocks at the top. The top of the pyramid stood 6.1 metres (20 ft) high and was topped by a temple, parts of which survive and have been restored. The walls were built from packed earth coated with stucco; a section of the northern portion of the rear wall still stands to a height of 1.1 metres (3.6 ft). A wide stucco bench was built against the rear wall and a concave hollow in the floor was probably designed for the burning of incense. The roof of the temple was likely to have been thatched. The third and final construction phase was considerably larger than the preceding versions of the pyramid. In its final form the pyramid base measured 18.25 by 9.75 metres (59.9 by 32.0 ft); it had five corniced levels and only possessed a single stairway in place of the earlier two. The stairway was flanked by two wide ramps, only the lower portion of the stairway and ramps survive. The top of the pyramid stood almost 2 metres (6.6 ft) higher than the preceding version and preserved parts of the earlier temple building in its infill; the upper platform has largely collapsed and no trace remains of the final version of the temple superstructure. Both the second and third versions of the pyramid were originally coated in stucco, parts of which were preserved. New stucco was applied during restoration work to match the original coating. Although the pyramid was restored after it was excavated, the 1976 Guatemala earthquake caused considerable damage and the upper portion of the pyramid was reduced to rubble.

A burial was excavated from in front of the wall of the earliest version of the pyramid. The associated offerings included a number of clay vessels, a necklace of small gold bells and a copper axe. The earliest metal artefacts in the Maya region have been dated to the Terminal Classic period (c.800-900); the presence of metal artefacts associated with the earliest construction phase at Mixco Viejo (Jilotepeque Viejo) demonstrates the short span of the site and suggests that all three construction phases succeeded each other relatively rapidly. Further ceramic offerings were deposited under both of the latter two phases and an artificially deformed skull was interred under the central axis of the final version.

Platform C2 faces Pyramid C1 and borders the Group C Plaza. The platform is a long rectangular structure measuring 47.3 by 14 metres (155 by 46 ft) (north-south by east-west) and occupies the highest location of any structure at Mixco Viejo (Jilotepeque Viejo). The platform has two levels and has a total height of 4.4 metres (14 ft), the lower of which has a prominent cornice. The east side of the lower level has an inset stairway accessing the upper level. The upper level of the platform is recessed against the rear of the lower level and possesses an elaborate facade with four access stairways separated by corniced ramps. The entire platform was originally coated in stucco, of which only a few traces remain. On the upper level the stucco traces outline where walls once stood, leading archaeologists to conclude that several residential structures once stood on top. Platform C2 was built upon an earlier, shorter platform that possessed a facade composed of thin slabs. It is likely that Platform C2 provided restricted access to Pyramid C1. A number of funerary urns were excavated from the base of Platform C2.

Structure C6 was an observation platform that formed the south side of the East Plaza. It faced out southwards across the neighbouring valley.

Platform C7 is an L-shaped platform that closes the east side and northeast corner of the East Plaza. Steps run the entire length of the platform.

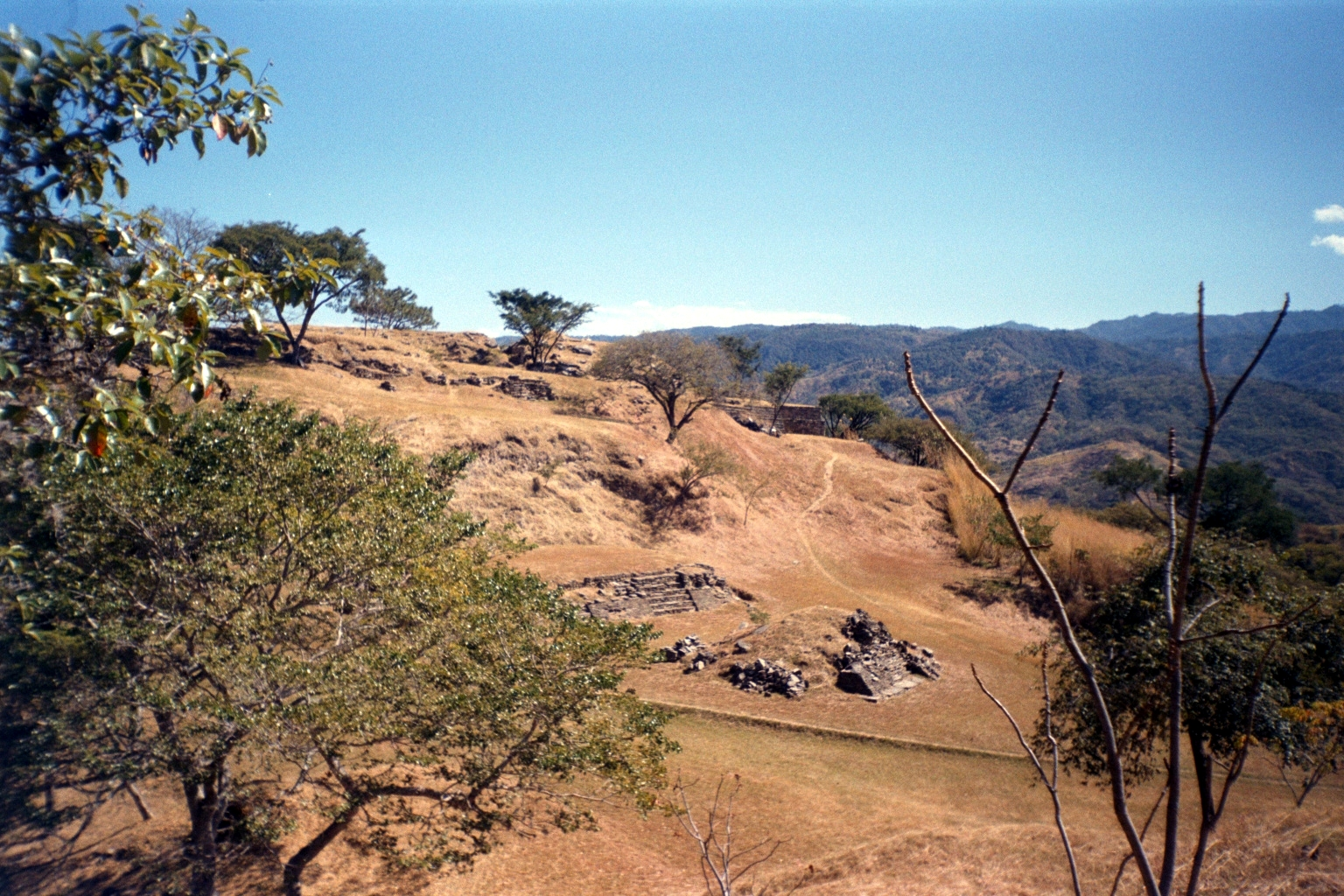
The lower part of Group C, with Structures C11 and C14

Structure C8 is a residential compound that was accessed from the alley running to the East Plaza from behind Pyramid C1. The entrance opened onto the alley from a patio situated in the southern portion of the compound. This patio was surrounded on the east, west and north sides by rooms, with the alley to the south. It was floored with stucco and Structure C8 was the only stuccoed residential building in the whole of the city. The north range of rooms backed directly onto the ravine immediately to the north of Group C; the lower portion of the walls of the west room and of half of the north room still stand. The west room was square while the north room was narrow and probably extended the entire width of the patio. Wear marks in the stucco floor indicate that a door once accessed the north room from the west. The workmanship of Structure C8 was of very high quality and indicates that it was the residence of a member of the city's elite. Its proximity to the large pyramid-temple C1 has led archaeologist Henri Lehmann to speculate that it was once the house of the high priest.

Structure C11 was a small pyramid temple in the lower (western) section of Group C. It was built from small slabs of stone and faced west with an access stairway flanked by ramps. The structure overlies an earlier version that was built using pumice.

Structure C12 is a south-facing platform built from pumice. It divides the West Plaza in two. The upper surface of the platform is marked by a circle of burnt clay formed by the burning of incense.

Structure C13 is a platform closing the southern half of the west side of the West Plaza.

Structure C14 is a platform in the lower part of Group C, close to Pyramid C11.

===== Group C' =====
Group C' is a small group east of Group C; it is immediately south of Group B and adjoins it.

Structure C'1 is an unexcavated mound.

Structure C'2 is another unexcavated mound; it is smaller than Structure C'1.

===== Group D =====
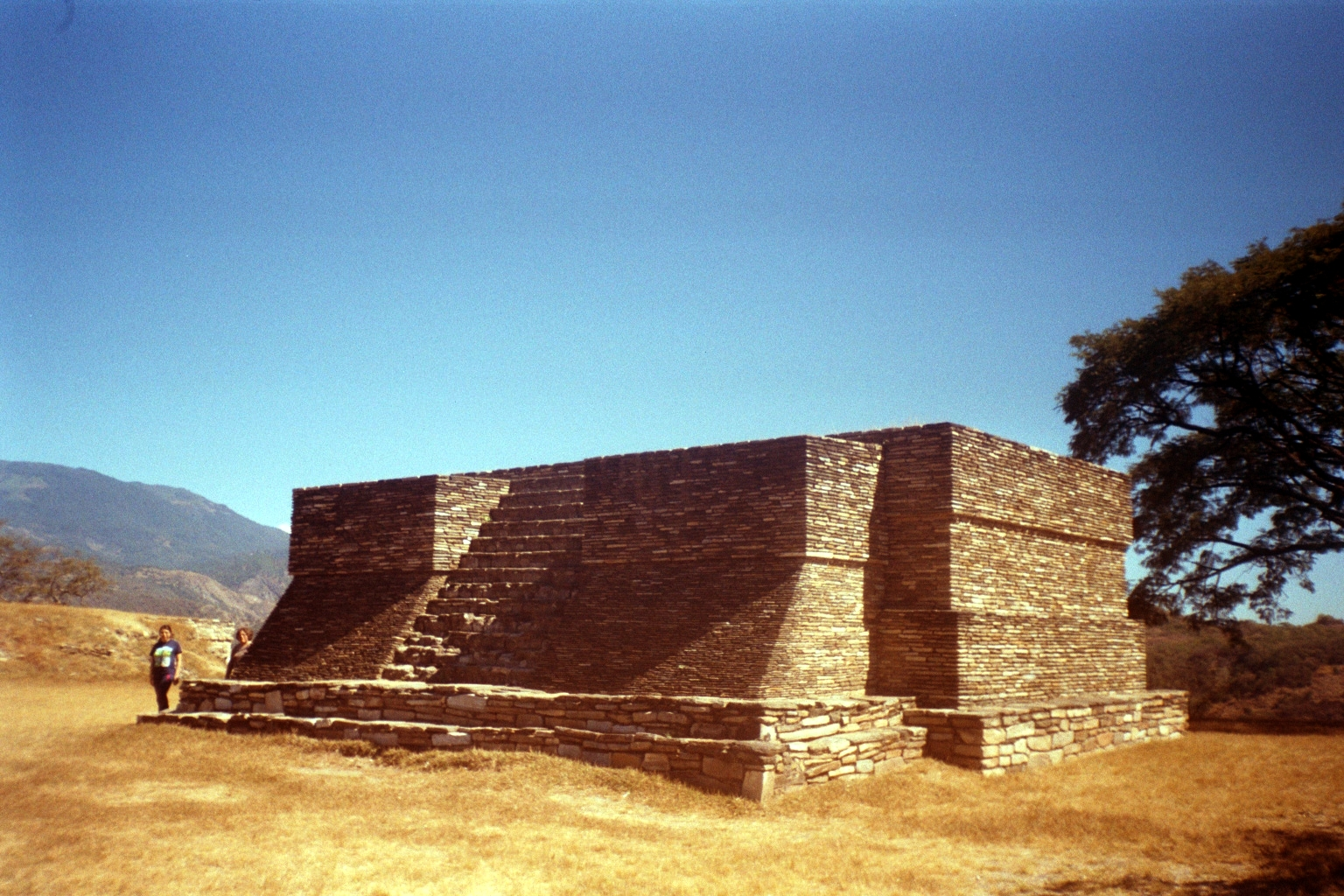
Pyramid D1

Group D is a dispersed group to the east of Group B.

Pyramid D1 is on the east side of the Group D plaza. The pyramid had three stepped levels erected upon a low base. It faces west towards the plaza and had a single access stairway flanked by sloping balustrades that terminate in vertical sections at the upper extremes. The pyramid was of fine workmanship using well-cut stone slabs. However, itw was poorly preserved and the southern part had partially collapsed. The surviving portions of the building allowed it to be accurately restored by archaeologists.

Platform D2 is on the north side of the Group D plaza; it has not been investigated by archaeologists.

Platform D3 is on the south side of the Group D plaza and has not been subject to archaeological investigation.

Structure D4 is a small altar in the centre of the Group D plaza.

Platform D5 is a south-facing range structure of great length with just two access stairways. Excavations uncovered a number of funerary urns deposited under the back wall of the structure, the only example burial urns being interred behind such a platform.

===== Group E =====
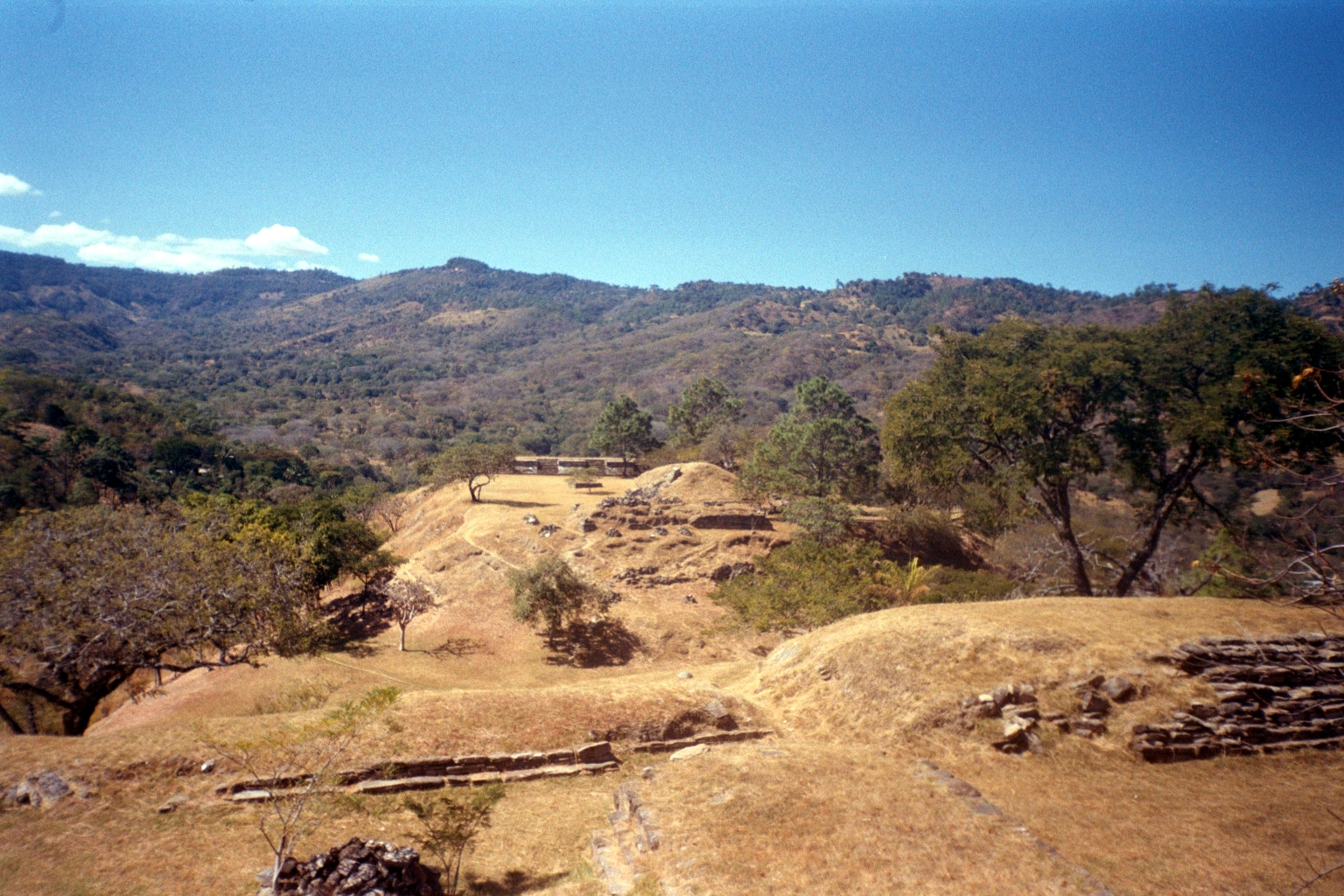
View across Group E from Group C

Group E is located to the west of Group C. Group E is largely surrounded by steep ravines; the inhabitants of the city cut the cliffs to make them steeper and more defensible, and reinforced them with a retaining wall. Archaeological investigations failed to find any access stairway through the retaining wall to Group E.

Pyramid E1 is located on the east side of the Group E plaza and was the most important building in Group E. The pyramid had three construction phases, the oldest of which was built from pumice upon a natural 2-metre (6.6 ft) high elevation and was found to be well preserved during excavations of the site. This early phase was packed with rounded pebbles to provide the infill for the second phase of construction. The second version of the pyramid was very poorly preserved; excavations uncovered many stucco fragments but were unable to determine which of the first two construction phases they belonged to. The third and final phase of construction was larger than the preceding versions of the building and encased both them and the natural elevation upon which they stood. The pyramid had four stepped levels upon a basal platform. It faced west with an access stairway flanked by two ramps that terminated in projecting masonry blocks at the top. A small altar was excavated at the base of the pyramid; two stones were found placed upon it. One of these stones was ball-shaped while the other was perforated and may have been a mace or club. A number of funerary urns were excavated at the base of the southern side of the pyramid.

Structure E2 is a range structure on the north side of the Group E plaza. It has not been subject to archaeological investigation.

Structure E3 is a square altar in the middle of the Group E plaza. It faces towards Pyramid E1.

Structure E4 is a platform located behind Pyramid E1 and encloses the eastern side of the Group E plaza. It faces west onto the plaza and has two access stairways, both flanked by ramps built from small slabs of stone and with cornices at the top. The platform walls are of fine workmanship, being built with well-cut and carefully fitted pumice. The front portion of the upper platform was paved with stone slabs, and a bench ran the entire length of the back of the platform. The clay floor between the paving and the bench was found to have been burnt. An offering was excavated from the central axis of the platform's base, it consisted of two ring-shaped clubs placed on either side of a stone ball.

Platform E6 is situated on the west side of the Group E plaza. It is roughly built from irregularly sized, poorly cut stones. The platform faces east towards Pyramid E1 and has four access stairways. The platform once supported perishable residences; these were built from maize stalks bound together with clay, as evidenced by the imprint of the maize stalks in the fragments of clay wall recovered during excavations. The platform itself was once covered with stucco.

===== Other groups =====
Group E' is a cluster of small buildings in the trough between the hilltops supporting Groups C and E.

Group F is to the west of Group E. Mound F is the main structure within Group F. It slopes gradually away to the west and was not easily defensible on that side, however it lay outside the strong retaining walls of the fortress and appears to have been an observation platform covering the western pass to the city. A retaining wall supported the mound above the pass and a round earth platform upon the mound may have supported a perishable watchtower.

Group G consists of a number of small structures strung out along the ridge to the north of Group A.

Group H is a small group to the northeast of Group A. Structure H1 is a platform that uses a natural mound as its base.

Group I is also known as the Campana Group. It is the northernmost group at Mixco Viejo (Jilotepeque Viejo).

Group J is a cluster of small buildings immediately southwest of Group A and adjoining it.

==== Caves ====
Three small caves are found in the sides of the ridge supporting the ruins of the city; archaeological investigations have revealed that two of these caves were artificially modified in antiquity.

Cueva de La Lola ("Lola's Cave") is situated below Group A, near the bank of the Pancaco River as it flows to the northwest of the ruins. The cave is 8.7 metres (29 ft) deep and 6.1 metres (20 ft) wide; for most of its length it is 2 metres (6.6 ft) high. The cave had been artificially widened and heightened. During the rain season rainwater filtering through the ground below the city flows out as a small waterfall at the bottom of the cave. The cave was used for ceremonial activities, related to the presence of the spring within it and the fact that the walls are formed from green phyllite; greenstone was sacred to the Maya and was associated with water and fertility. Ritual activities in the cave have continued into modern times, with ceremonial fires being lit within.

Cueva del Murciélago ("Cave of the Bat") is located at the southern extreme of the site. It is 14.3 metres (47 ft) deep; at its widest point it is 1.5 metres (4.9 ft) wide and the cave is 1.5 metres (4.9 ft) high. It was artificially widened to permit access and was still used for Maya ceremonies in the late 20th century, when archaeologists found recent evidence of activity.

=== Funerary offerings ===
A large quantity of funerary urns have been excavated from the bases of buildings; the deceased were cremated and their ashes collected in the urns. The sides of the urns were perforated with three holes, perhaps to represent the eyes and mouth of the deceased. The urns were decorated with polychrome motifs in the form of highly stylised serpent decorations painted in black, red and cream; this style of Maya ceramics has been labelled as Chinautla Polychrome after the site where it was first identified. The Postclassic Maya custom of interring the cremated remains of the deceased in urns was restricted to the elite; commoners where buried in simple tombs outside the city centre. In Jilotepeque Viejo urns were usually buried under the front of platform bases or under the sides of pyramids and altars. This was not a general practice among the highland Maya in the Postclassic and represents a tradition unique to the city. Funerary urns have been found interred under all the principal plazas of the city. Approximately equal proportions of urns were interred under platforms and under the ceremonial architecture represented by pyramids and altars, although it is impossible to say if those individuals buried under religious architecture had differing roles than those buried under secular architecture.

A total of 52 urns were excavated from the ruins of Jilotepeque Viejo; 8 of these were destroyed by the 1976 earthquake leaving 44 available for study. Twelve of these were in the collection of the Musée de l'Homme in Paris for approximately thirty years; These urns, together with all other artefacts from Mixco Viejo (Jilotepeque Viejo), were repatriated to Guatemala in 1998. Each urn contained the cremated remains of a single adult. All of these appeared to be mature or elderly adults; the remains of young adults were notably absent, indicating that elite warriors were buried in some other manner. The urns themselves represented a variety of highland ceramic types. Analysis of bone fragments in the cremated remains indicates that the entire body was burnt without any special treatment for the skull, although the offering of a skull was excavated from Pyramid C1. Surviving skull fragments indicated the practice of artificial skull deformation among the elite inhabitants of the city. The remains of animal bones were found mixed among a significant portion of the contents of the urns; where identifiable these included deer bones and those of a number of bird species, particularly parrots and birds of prey.

Only six of the urns contained associated funerary offerings:

Offerings in funerary urns from Jilotepeque Viejo
Urn	Structure	Offering
Urn 6317	C2	a small serpentine axe, tweezers and a worked deer bone
Urn 6826	B8	two perforated animal bone tubes and a jadeite bead
Urn 6835	B3b	a small green stone and a piece of a prismatic blade
Urn 6899	?	a copper spatula
Urn 7602	A5	three pieces of greenstone and four jadeite beads
Urn 7607	D1	four obsidian blades, tweezers and a piece of a greenstone bead
