= PRQ (disambiguation) =

PRQ may stand for:

- PRQ, a Swedish internet service provider
- Ashéninka Perené, the Campa family language of Peru, ISO 639 identifier
- Parti républicain du Québec
