= Jalapa, Jalapa =

Jalapa
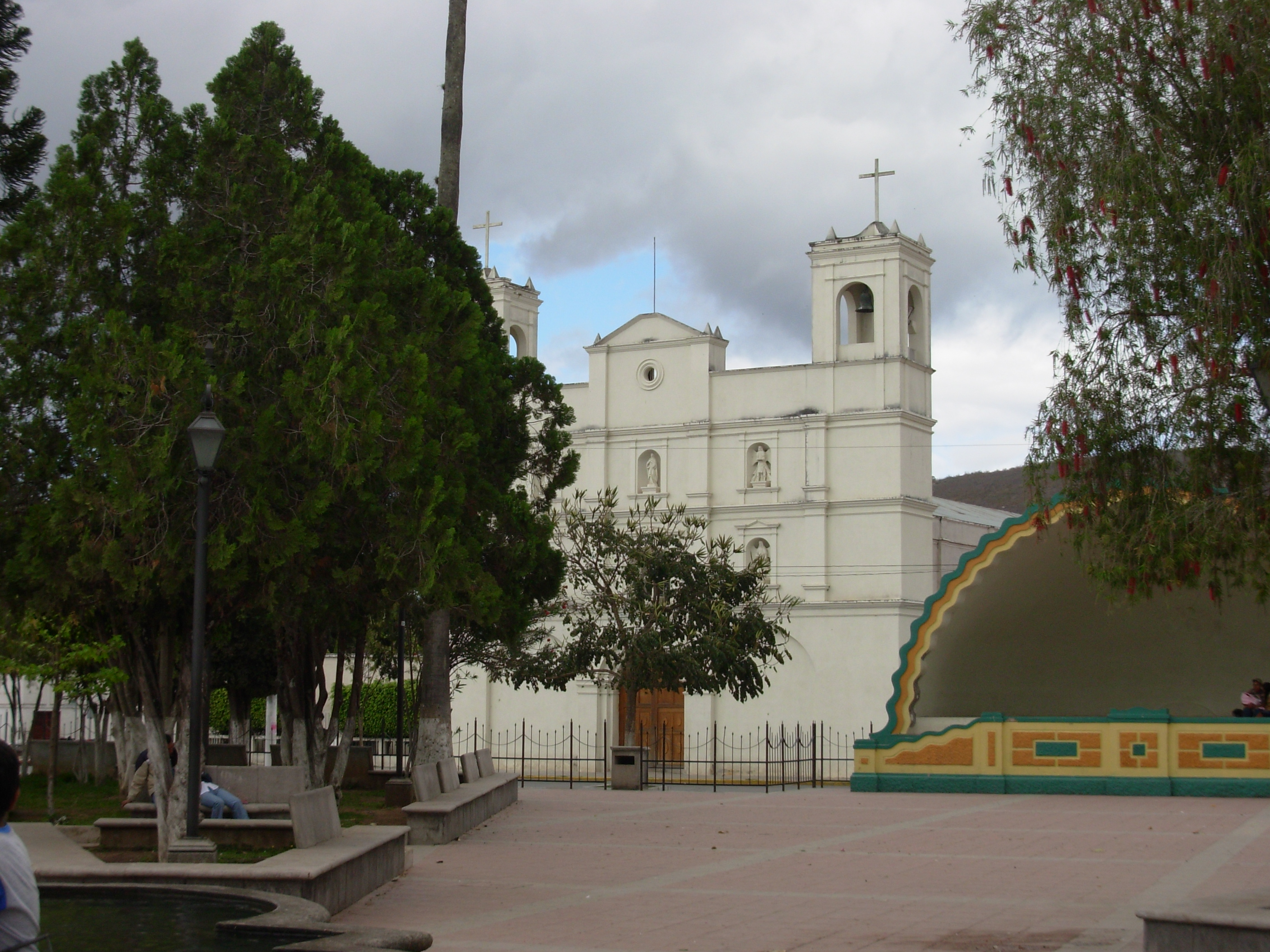
- Catholic church in Jalapa

- Flag Seal

- Location in Guatemala
- Coordinates: 14°38′N 89°59′W
- Country: Guatemala
- Department: Jalapa

Area
  - Total: 265 sq mi (686 km^{2})

Population (2023)
  - Total: 195,321

Jalapa is a municipality and the seat of the Jalapa Department in Guatemala. The municipality covers an area of 686 km^{2} (265 sq mi), making it the largest municipality by area in the Jalapa department. As per 2023 estimate, the municipality of Jalapa had a population of 195,321 inhabitants.

== Etymology ==
"Jalapa" is derived from the Nahuatl words "xal" and "apan" roughly translating to "place in sandy water". The settlement was earlier known as Santa María Xalapán and Santa María Jalapa.

== History ==
The settlement of Jalapa was populated by the Poqomam people, who migrated from the foothills of the Jumay Volcano, due to its volcanic activity in the early 15th century. In 1528, the Spanish conquered the region after a battle. As of 1850, the population of Jalapa was approximately 3,500. The Jalapa Department was established on 24 November 1873. On 26 August 1878, Jalapa was elevated to the category of a city. The first patron feast was established by government agreement of 26 August 1881 fro 29 to 31 December. The date was subsequently changed on several occasions and was set as 15 September in 2010.

== Geography ==
Jalapa is one of the seven municipalities in the Jalapa Department in Guatemala. It also serves as the seat of the department. It is located in the highlands of southeastern Guatemala at an elevation of 1,362 m (4,469 ft). The municipality covers an area of 686 km^{2} (265 sq mi), making it the largest municipality by area in the Jalapa department. It is located to the north the Pan American Highway, and serves as the commercial and administrative centre for the Jalapa department.

== Demographics ==
As per 2023 estimate, the municipality of Jalapa had a population of 195,321 inhabitants. The population consists of 96,083 males and 99,238 females. The entire population was classified as urban. The municipality had a literacy rate of 81.4%. Spanish was the most spoken language, with almost 99% of the population indicating it as their mother tongue. The Ladino (49.4%) and Xinka (48.9%) people formed the majority of the population. About 91.6% of the population were born locally.
