= Jalapa River =

Jalapa river

Location
- Country: Guatemala
- Department: Jalapa

Physical characteristics
- Source
  - location: Guatemala (Jalapa)
- Mouth
  - location: Tributary of the Motagua River

The Jalapa river (also known as Río El Tambor or Río Chimalapea) is a river in the south of Guatemala. From its sources in the mountain range southwest of the city of Jalapa, the river flows in a northeastern direction until it reaches the Motagua River at 14.934419°N 89.818726°W.
