= San Pedro Pinula =

Coordinates: 14°40′N 89°51′W

- Municipality
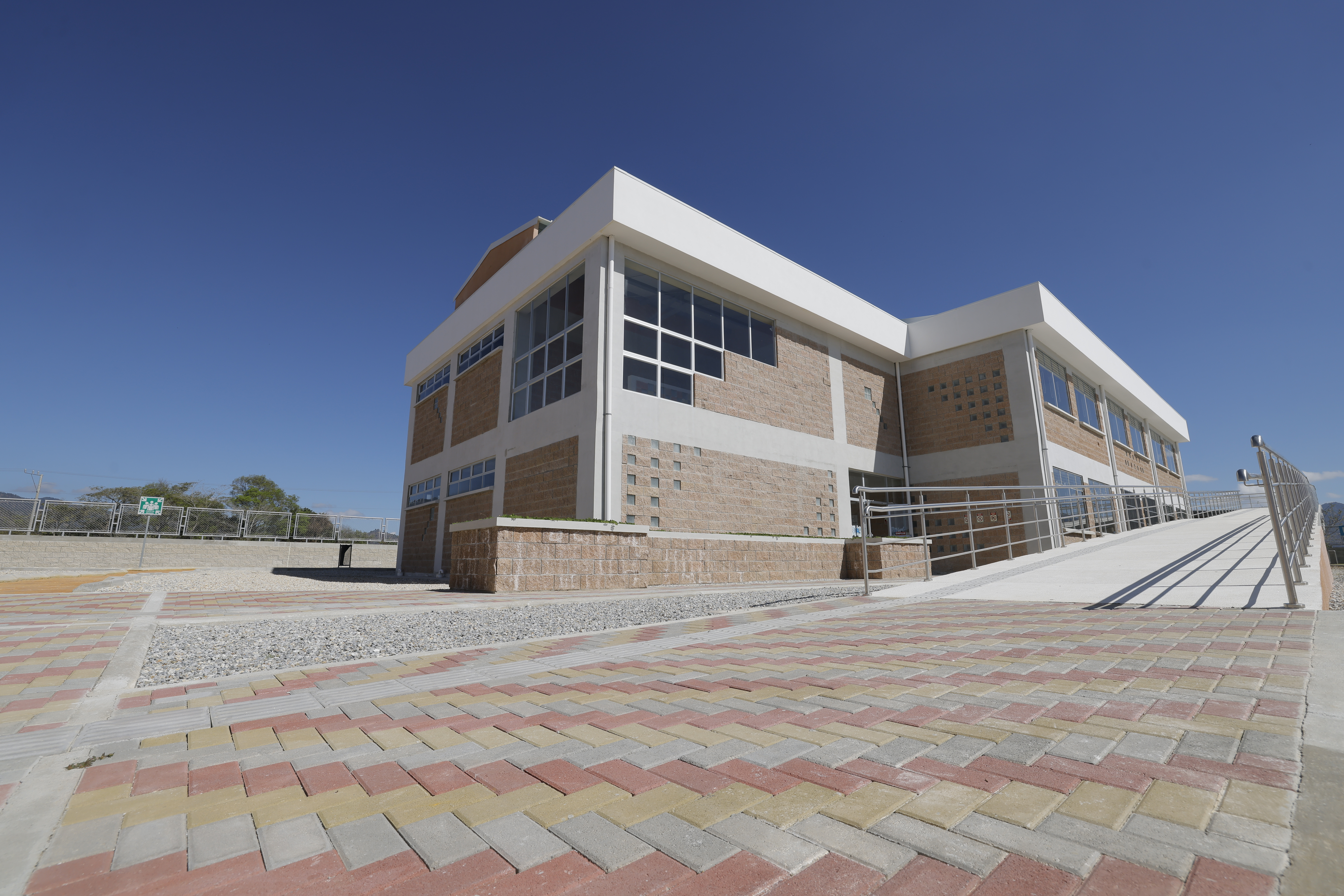
- Interactive map of San Pedro Pinula
- Country: Guatemala
- Department: Jalapa

Area
  - Total: 515.9 km^{2} (199.2 sq mi)

Population (2023)
  - Total: 79,597
  - Density: 154.3/km^{2} (399.6/sq mi)

San Pedro Pinula is a town and municipality in the Jalapa department of Guatemala. It covers an area of approximately 515.9 km^{2} (199.2 sq mi). As per 2023 estimates, it has a population of about 79,597 inhabitants.

== History ==
The region was earlier occupied by Poqomam people, and the name is derived from the Poqomam language, with "pinole" referring to traditional flour and "ha" or "ja" means water or land, roughly translating to "water of pinole" or "land of pinole". The name has the prefix "San Pedro" in honor of Saint Peter. The municipality was created in 1836 as a part of Jalapa circuit in district of Chiquimula. It was later incorporated into the department of Jalapa when the department was officially created in 1873.

== Geography ==
San Pedro Pinula is a municipality in the department of Jalapa in Guatemala. It is spread over an area of 515.9 km^{2} (199.2 sq mi).

Located at an elevation of 1,379.63 m (4,526.3 ft) above sea level, the district has a tropical monsoon climate (Köppen climate classification: Am). The average annual temperature is 21.64 °C (70.95 °F). The district receives an average annual rainfall of 15.03 cm (5.92 in) and has 197.24 average rainy days in a year.

== Demographics ==
San Pedro Pinula had an estimated population of 79,597 inhabitants in 2023. The population consisted of 39,540 males and 40,057 females. About 35.1% of the population was below the age of fourteen, and 4.5% was over the age of 65 years. About 85.6% of the population was classified as rural, and the rest (14.4%) lived in urban areas. Most of the residents (95.2%) were born in the same municipality. The city had a literacy rate of 68.7%. Ladinos (89.3%) formed the major ethnic group, with Maya (10.0%) forming a significant minority. Spanish (99.2%) was the most spoken language.
