= Popoloca languages =

Language cluster

Popoloca
- Geographic distribution: Puebla, Mexico
- Native speakers: 17,000 (2020 census)
- Linguistic classification: Oto-Manguean: Popolocan; Chocho–Popoloca; Popoloca
- Subdivisions: Eastern; Central/Western

Language codes
- Glottolog: popo1294
- ELP: Popoloca
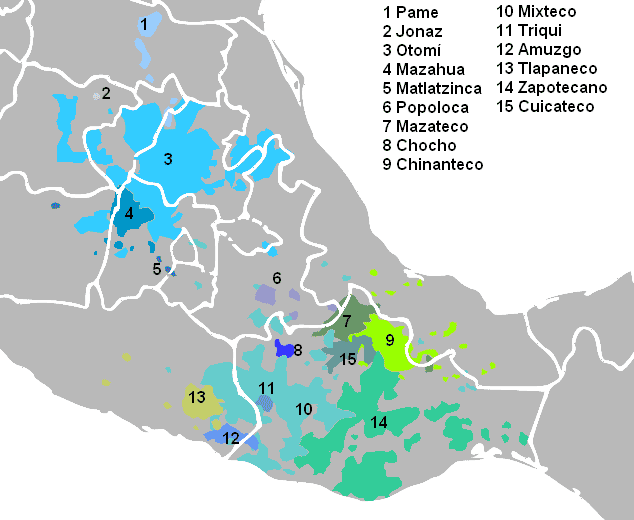
- The Popoloca languages, number 6 (purple), center.

Popoloca is an indigenous Mexican cluster of languages of the Popolocan branch of the Oto-Manguean language family, closely related to Mazatec. They are spoken by 17,000 people in Puebla state, Mexico, near Tehuacán.

== Languages ==
The Ethnologue distinguishes seven varieties of Popoloca as separate languages. However, these fall into four groups with 75% mutual intelligibility or greater.

- Eastern Popoloca
  - Southern (Atzingo–Metzontla: San Juan, Los Reyes)
  - Northern (Temalacayuca–Tlacoyalco: San Luis, San Marcos)
- Central Popoloca
  - Coyotepec (San Mateo dialect may be distinct, or a dialect of San Felipe)
  - Western (Ahuatempan–Otlaltepec: Santa Inés, San Felipe)
