= San Luis Jilotepeque =

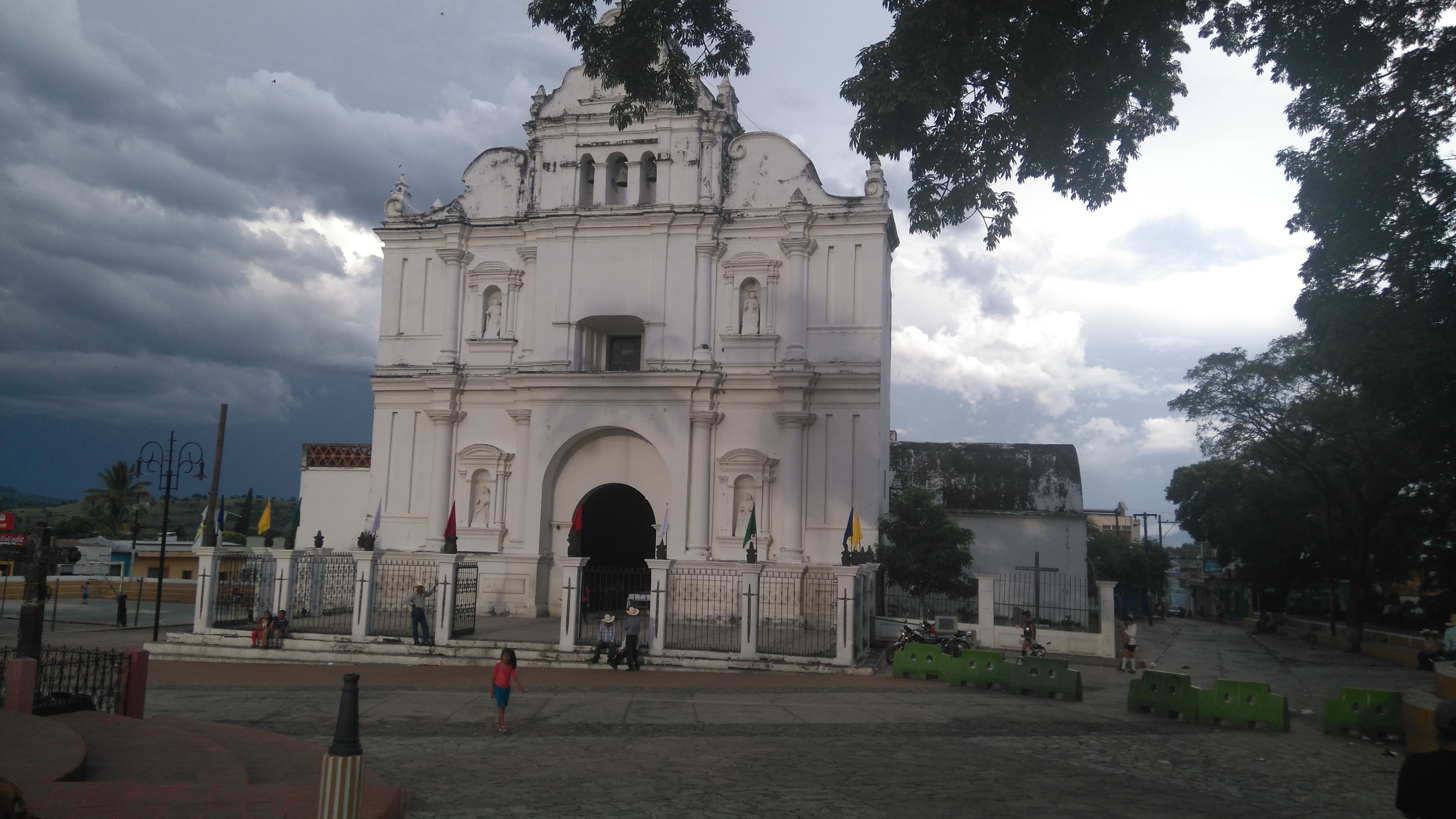

- Location in Guatemala
- Coordinates: 14°38′36″N 89°43′47″W
- Country: Guatemala
- Department: Jalapa

Area
  - Total: 80.6 sq mi (208.8 km^{2})
- Elevation: 2,590.6 ft (789.61 m)

Population (2023 estimate)
  - Total: 27,307
- Climate: Am

San Luis Jilotepeque is a municipality in the Jalapa Department of Guatemala. It covers an area of approximately 208.8 km^{2} (80.6 sq mi). As per 2023 estimates, it has a population of about 27,307 inhabitants.

== History ==
Jilotepeque is derived from the Nahuatl word "Xilotepeque" meaning "land of tender corn". The prefix San Luis is the Spanish reference to Louis IX of France.

The municipality is associated with the archaeological site of El Durazno in San Pedro Pinula, considered a former Mayan fortress. In 1530, it was relocated to the valley of the present-day San Luis Jilotepeque. From 1551 it belonged to the district of Chiquimula, and in 1873 it became part of the newly formed Jalapa department through government decree No. 170 enacted on 24 November 1873.

== Geography ==
San Luis Jilotepeque is a municipality in the department of Jalapa in Guatemala. It is spread over an area of 208.8 km^{2} (80.6 sq mi) and forms part of Region IV (Southeastern Guatemala). The municipal seat is located at the junction of National Route 18, about 143 km (89 mi) from the national capital of Guatemala City and 41 km (25 mi) from the departmental capital of Jalapa. It borders the municipalities of San Diego and San José La Arada to the north, Ipala to the east, San Manuel Chaparrón to the south, and San Pedro Pinula to the west.

It lies at an elevation of 789.61 m (2,590.6 ft) above sea level. The municipality has a tropical monsoon climate (Köppen classification: Am). The average annual temperature is 19.63 °C (67.33 °F). The municipality receives about 136.27 mm (5.365 in) of rainfall annually and has 178.87 rainy days per year.

== Demographics ==
San Luis Jilotepeque had an estimated population of 27,307 inhabitants in 2023. The population consisted of 13,411 males and 13,896 females. About 24.9% of the population was below the age of fourteen, and 7.5% was over the age of 65 years. About 52.7% of the population was classified as rural, while 47.3% lived in urban areas. Most residents (88.9%) were born in the same municipality.

Maya (65%) formed the major ethnic group, followed by Ladinos (34.6%). Spanish (94.3%) was the most spoken language, with small minorities speaking indigenous languages such as Kaqchikel and Mam. The literacy rate of the municipality was 77.7%.
