= Poqomam people =

Poqomam
Total population
- 46,478

Regions with significant populations

Languages
- Poqomam, Spanish

Religion
- Catholic, Maya religion

Related ethnic groups
- others

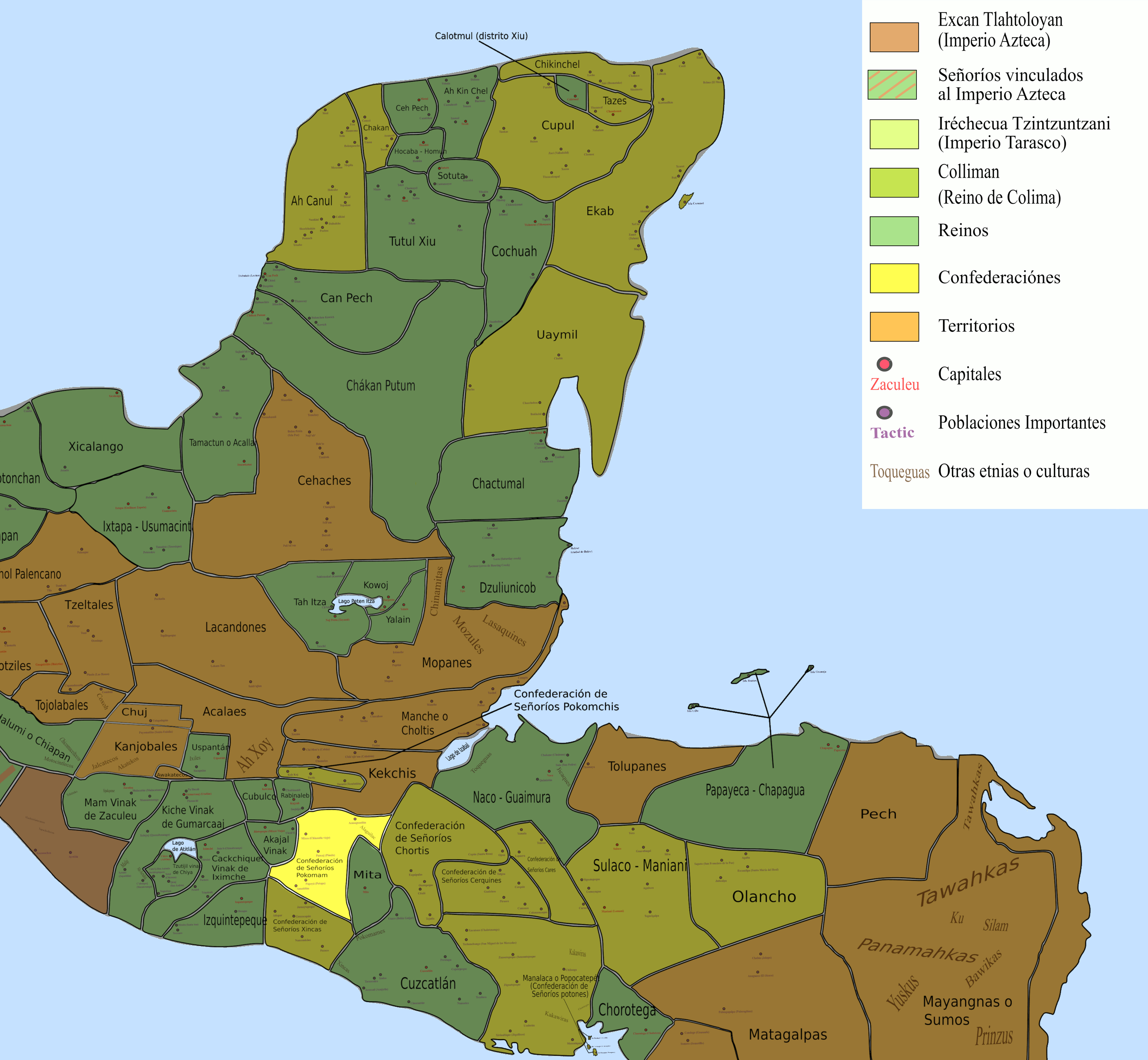
Map of the Paqomam Confederation, c. 1520

The Poqomam are a Maya people in Guatemala and El Salvador. Their indigenous language is also called Poqomam and is closely related to Poqomchiʼ. Notable Poqomam settlements are located in Chinautla (Guatemala (department)), Palín (Escuintla), and in San Luis Jilotepeque (Jalapa). Before the Spanish Conquest, the Poqomam had their capital at Chinautla Viejo. The Poqomam that advanced further east, to the territories of present-day El Salvador, were largely displaced by the migration of the Pipil people in the 11th century. The few Poqomam that remained in El Salvador live near the Guatemala border, in the departments of Santa Ana and Ahuachapan.

== See also ==
- Mixco Viejo
