= Northern Popoloca language =

Oto-Manguean language of Puebla, Mexico

Northern Popoloca
- Native to: Mexico
- Region: Puebla
- Native speakers: (13,000 cited 1994–2000)
- Language family: Oto-Manguean: Popolocan; Chocho–Popoloca; Popoloca; Northern Popoloca

Language codes
- ISO 639-3: Either: pps – San Luís Temalacayuca pls – San Marcos Tlacoyalco
- Glottolog: sanl1248 San Luis Temalacayuca sanm1301 San Marcos Tlalcoyalco

Northern Popoloca is an indigenous language of Puebla state, Mexico. The dialects of the two towns where it is spoken, San Luís Temalacayuca (a.k.a. Temalacayuca, San Luís) and San Marcos Tlacoyalco (a.k.a. Tlacoyalco, San Marcos), are over 90% mutually intelligible.

== Phonology ==
=== Vowels ===
	Front	Central	Back
Close	i		o~u
Mid	ɛ		o~u
Open		a	

=== Consonants ===
		Bilabial	Dental	Alveolar		Post- Alveolar	Retroflex	Palatal	Velar	Glottal
Nasal		m		n				ɲ		
Plosive		p	t̪	t					k	ʔ
Affricate				t͡s		t͡ʃ	t͡ʂ			
Fricative	voiceless	ɸ		s		ʃ	ʂ			h
Fricative	voiced	β	ð	z		ʒ			ɣ	
Rhotic				ɾ	r					
Approximant				l				j		
