= Monjas River =

River of Ecuador

Coordinates: 0.0333°N 78.4166°W

Monjas River ("Rio Monjas"; translation: Nun River) is located in Pichincha Province, Ecuador. It has been associated with environmental problems because of the discharge from nearby factories.
