= San Manuel Chaparrón =

- Location in Guatemala
- Coordinates: 14°31′N 89°46′W
- Country: Guatemala
- Department: Jalapa

Area
  - Total: 49.2 sq mi (127.5 km^{2})

Population (2023 estimate)
  - Total: 9,239
- Climate: Am

San Manuel Chaparrón (Spanish pronunciation: [san maˈnwel tʃapaˈron]) is a municipality in the Jalapa Department of Guatemala. It covers an area of approximately 127.5 km^{2} (49.2 sq mi). As per 2023 estimates, it has a population of about 9,239 inhabitants.

== History ==
The name "Chaparrón" is derived from the name of a tree that bore a yellow fruit situated on the banks of the Chaparrón River. The prefix "San Manuel" is the Spanish for Saint Manuel or Saint Emmanuel. The settlement originated from a hacienda, which later became a village called Espinal. The municipality was officially founded by government decree 106 dated 24 November 1873.

== Geography ==
San Manuel Chaparrón is a municipality in the department of Jalapa in Guatemala. It is spread over an area of 127.5 km^{2} (49.2 sq mi). Recreational areas are located in the villages of La Ventana, La Peña and Agua Tibia in the municipality.

Located at an elevation of 1,379.63 m (4,526.3 ft) above sea level, the municipality has a tropical monsoon climate (Köppen climate classification: Am). The average annual temperature is 19.55 °C (67.19 °F). The municipality receives an average annual rainfall of 13.57 cm (5.34 in) and has 178.18 average rainy days in a year.

== Demographics ==
San Manuel Chaparrón had an estimated population of 9,239 inhabitants in 2023. The population consisted of 4,511 males and 4,728 females. About 25% of the population was below the age of fourteen, and 8.4% was over the age of 65 years. About 59.8% of the population was classified as rural, and the rest (40.2%) lived in urban areas. Most of the residents (79.5%) were born in the same municipality. The municipality had a literacy rate of 81.1%.

San Manuel Chaparrón has the lowest indigenous population in the department of Jalapa with Ladinos (99.1%) forming the major ethnic group. Spanish (99.5%) was the most spoken language. The predominant religion is Catholic, with the annual fair held between 9 and 12 March in commemoration of Saint Emmanuel (San Manuel).
