= Coyotepec Popoloca language =

Indigenous language of Puebla state, Mexico

Coyotepec Popoloca
- Native to: Mexico
- Region: Puebla
- Ethnicity: 7,000 in the town
- Native speakers: (500 cited 1990 census)
- Language family: Oto-Manguean: Popolocan; Chocho–Popoloca; Popoloca; Coyotepec Popoloca

Language codes
- ISO 639-3: pbf
- Glottolog: coyo1236

Coyotepec Popoloca is an indigenous language of the Mexican state of Puebla. It is spoken in the municipality of Coyotepec. The dialect of the town of San Mateo is counted as Coyotepec, but it may be a distinct language, or a dialect of San Felipe Otlaltepec (Western Popoloca). Coyotepec proper and Western Popoloca are about 40% mutually intelligible.
