= Southern Popoloca language =

Popolocan language of Puebla, Mexico

Southern Popoloca
- Native to: Mexico
- Region: Puebla
- Native speakers: (7,000 cited 1991–1993)
- Language family: Oto-Manguean: Popolocan; Chocho–Popoloca; Popoloca; Southern Popoloca

Language codes
- ISO 639-3: Either: poe – San Juan Atzingo pbe – Metzontla
- Glottolog: sanj1285 San Juan Atzingo mezo1235 Mezontla

Southern Popoloca is an indigenous language of Puebla state, Mexico. There are two principal varieties, sometimes counted as distinct languages, which are about 75% mutually intelligible:

- San Juan Atzingo Popoloca (a.k.a. Atzingo, San Juan)
- Metzontla Popoloca (a.k.a. Los Reyes Metzontla Popoloca)

== Phonology ==
=== Consonants ===
Consonants in the San Juan Atzingo dialect
		Labial	Dental/ Alveolar		Post-alv./ Palatal	Retroflex	Velar	Glottal
Nasal	voiced	m	n					
Nasal	voiceless	m̥ ⟨jm⟩	n̥ ⟨jn⟩					
Plosive		p	t				k	ʔ ⟨h, '⟩
Affricate			t͡s ⟨ts⟩		t͡ʃ	t͡ʂ ⟨chr⟩		
Fricative		f	ð ⟨d⟩	s	ʃ ⟨x⟩	ʂ ⟨xr⟩		h ⟨j⟩
Rhotic			r					
Lateral			l					
Approximant		w ⟨v⟩			j			

- Consonants preceding /h/ are then heard as aspirated [Cʰ]; when preceding /ʔ/, they are heard as ejectives [Cʼ].

Consonants in the Mezontla dialect
		Labial	Dental	Alveolar	Post-alv.	Palatal	Velar	Glottal
Nasal	voiced	m		n				
Nasal	voiceless	m̥		n̥				
Plosive/Affricate	voiceless	p	t͡s	t	t͡ʂ	t͡ʃ	k	ʔ
Plosive/Affricate	aspirated		t͡sʰ	tʰ	t͡ʂʰ	t͡ʃʰ	kʰ	
Plosive/Affricate	voiced	b		d			ɡ	
Plosive/Affricate	prenasal	ᵐb		ⁿd		ᶮd͡ʒ	ᵑɡ	
Fricative	voiceless	(f)		s	ʃ ~ ʂ		x	
Fricative	prenasal			ⁿz			ᵑɣ	
Rhotic	voiced			r				
Rhotic	prenasal			ⁿr				
Lateral				l				
Approximant		w				j		

Marginal affricates include /k͡f, s͡t/.

- /ʃ/ is heard as retroflex [ʂ] when before vowels /a, ã, u, ũ/.
- /f/ is heard only from loanwords.
- /j/ may be realized as a nasal [ɲ] when in the position of nasal vowels.
- Stop consonants when preceding /ʔ/ are heard as ejectives [Cʼ].

=== Vowels ===
Vowels in the San Juan Atzingo dialect
	Oral			Nasal		
	Front	Central	Back	Front	Central	Back
Close	i		o~u	ĩ		õ~ũ
Mid	e		o~u	ẽ		õ~ũ
Open		a			ã	

- /o, õ/ when heard in diphthongs, and after consonants /t, k, ʔ, t͡ʃ, t͡ʂ, ʂ, n̥/ is heard as [u, ũ].
- Nasalization is indicated by ⟨n⟩ after the vowel.

Vowels in the Mezontla dialect
	Oral			Nasal		
	Front	Central	Back	Front	Central	Back
Close	i		u	ĩ		ũ
Mid	e			ẽ		
Open		a			ã	

=== Tones ===
Mezontla Popoloca has 3 tonemes.
