= Jalapa Department =

Department of Guatemala

Coordinates: 14°38′02″N 89°58′52″W

Jalapa Department Departmento de Jalapa
- Department
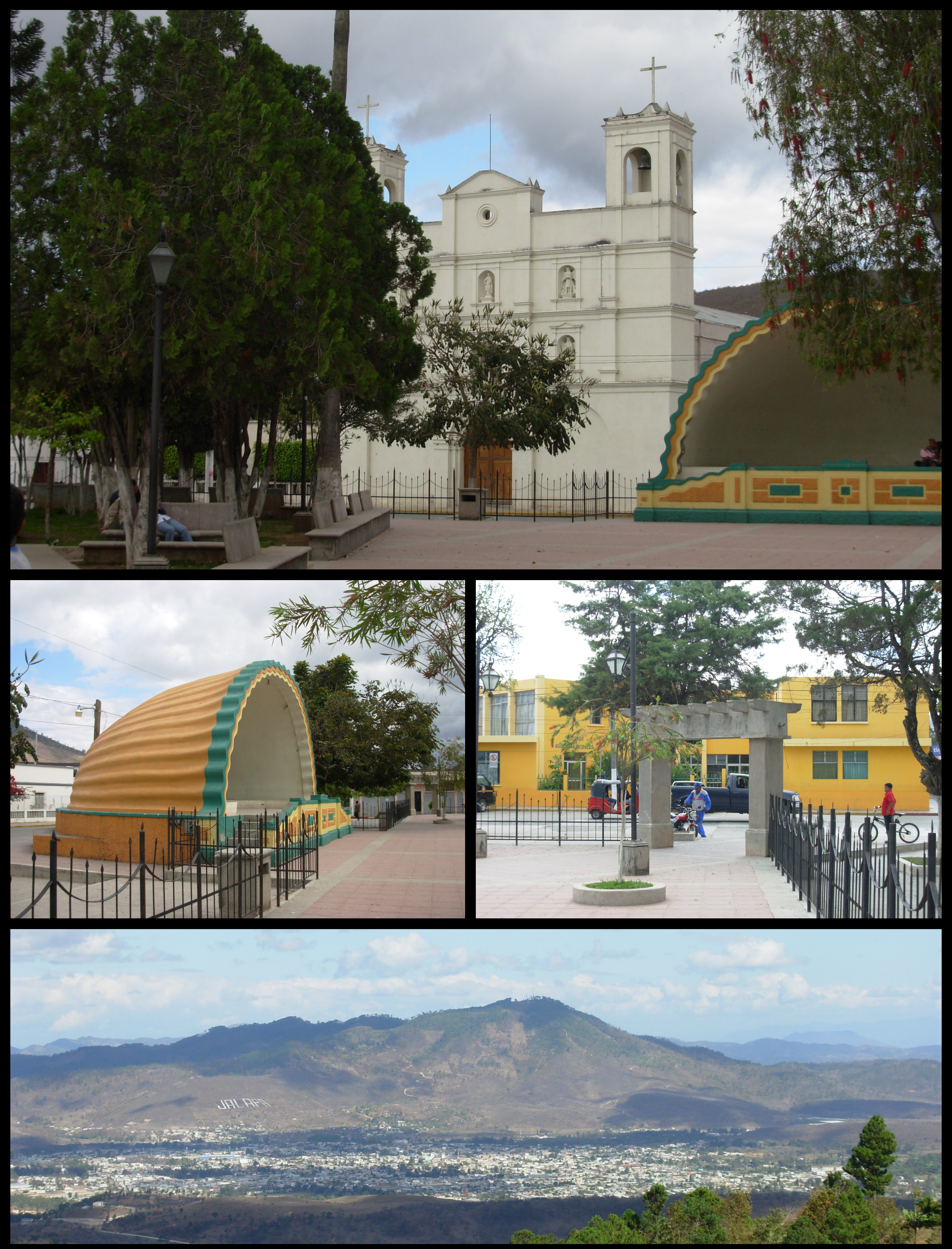
- From the top: Catholic Temple, Acoustic Shell, Municipality and Panoramic View.

- Flag Coat of arms

- Jalapa
- Country: Guatemala
- Capital: Jalapa
- Municipalities: 7

Government
  - Type: Departmental

Area
  - Department: 2,063 km^{2} (797 sq mi)

Population (2018)
  - Department: 380,612
  - Density: 184.5/km^{2} (477.8/sq mi)
  - Urban: 216,075
- Demonym: Jalapaneco
- Time zone: UTC-6

Jalapa is a department of Guatemala. It is located in the south east of the country with the seat and capital at the city of Jalapa. The department incorporates seven municipalities. Spread over an area of 2,063 km^{2} (797 sq mi), it had a population of 380,612 individuals in 2018.

== Geography ==
Jalapa is one of the 22 department of Guatemala. It was created as a separate department from Jutiapa Department in 1873. Spread across an area of 2,063 km^{2} (797 sq mi), it is located in the south east of the country with the seat and capital at the city of Jalapa. The department incorporates seven municipalities– Jalapa, Mataquescuintla, Monjas, San Carlos Alzatate, San Luis Jilotepeque, San Manuel Chaparrón, and San Pedro Pinula.

The region consists of mostly mountainous terrain with cold weather. Selected areas such as Monjas has plain lands in the valleys amongst the mountains with a relatively hotter climate. Volcán Jumay is a volcano in the department, which raised to a height of 2,176 m (7,139 ft). Several rivers, lagoons, and hot springs intersperse the region, with the major rivers including Jalapa, Guastatoya, Ostua, Platanos, and Monjas. The department is home to a variety of wildlife, including Mexican tree frog, giant toad, Sheep frog, great-tailed grackle, clay-colored thrush, and various species of snakes, butterflies, and other insects.

== Demographics ==
As per the 2018 census, the department of Jalapa had a population of 342,923 with 63% of the population living in urban areas. The Ladinos form the major ethnic group constituting more than 60% of the population. Sizeable minorities include Xincas and Mayas. About 98.6% of the population speak Spanish as their mother tongue, with other native languages constituting relative minorities.

== Economy ==
The economy is majorly dependent on agriculture which include crops. livestock, and dairy. Major agricultural products include maize, potatoes, coffee, sorghum, tobacco, apart from rice and wheat.
