= Volcán Jumay =

- Location within Guatemala

Highest point
- Elevation: 2,176 m (7,139 ft)
- Coordinates: 14°41′35″N 89°59′35″W

Geography
- Location: Guatemala

Geology
- Mountain type: Stratovolcano
- Last eruption: Unknown

Volcán Jumay is a volcano in the Jalapa department of Guatemala. It has an altitude of 2,176 metres (7,139 ft).
