= Coyotepec, Puebla =

Coordinates: 18.4252°N 97.8677°W

Coyotepec (municipality)
- Municipality and town
- Coat of arms

- Location of the municipality in Puebla
- Country: Mexico
- State: Puebla
- Time zone: UTC-6 (Central Standard Time)

Coyotepec is a municipality in the Mexican state of Puebla. The name comes from the Nahuatl words coyotl (coyote) and tepetl (hill)

The main settlements are the municipal seat at San Vicente Coyotepec, San Mateo Zoyamazalco and Nativitas Cuautempan.

The Coyotepec Popolocan language is spoken here along with Spanish
