= Parsi language =

Name used for several languages, some spurious

Parsi has been used as a name for several languages of Iran and South Asians, some of them spurious:

- Parsi, an alternative spelling of Farsi, the Persian language.
- Parsi, the variety of Gujarati spoken by the Parsis of Gujarat and Maharashtra in India. Prior to 2023, Ethnologue treated it as a separate language, with the ISO 639-3 code [prp]. That code has now been deprecated and the variety is instead subsumed under Gujarati.
- Parsi-Dari, a supposed language spoken by Zoroastrians in Iran. Ethnologue assigns it the ISO 639-3 code [prd], but Glottolog considers it spurious and a duplicate of the Zoroastrian Dari language [gbz].
- Parsi, a name occasionally used by speakers of Indo-Aryan languages of northern India to refer to speech forms they do not understand. It has been attested, among others, for Santali and Mal Paharia. It has frequently been used in reference to the secret languages of some social groups, for example that of the Bazigar people of north-west India.
