= Poqomam language =

Mayan language of Guatemala

Poqomam
- Poqomam
- Pronunciation: [poqomam]
- Native to: Guatemala, El Salvador
- Region: Alta Verapaz
- Ethnicity: 46,500 Poqomam (2019 census)
- Native speakers: 11,000 (2019 census)
- Language family: Mayan: Core Mayan; Quichean–Mamean; Greater Quichean; Pocom; Poqomam

Official status
- Recognised minority language in: Guatemala
- Regulated by: Academia de Lenguas Mayas de Guatemala

Language codes
- ISO 639-3: poc
- Glottolog: poqo1253
- ELP: Poqomam
- Poqomam

Poqomam is a Mayan language, closely related to Poqomchiʼ. It is spoken by 50,000 or so people in several small pockets in Guatemala, the largest of which is in Jalapa department.

== Geographic distribution ==
Poqomam is spoken in the following municipalities of Escuintla, Jalapa, and Guatemala departments (Variación Dialectal en Poqom, 2000).

- Guatemala
  - Chinautla
  - Mixco
- Jalapa
  - San Luis Jilotepeque
  - San Pedro Pinula
  - San Carlos Alzatate
- Escuintla
  - Palín

== Language revitalization ==
According to American Anthropologist, the revitalization of Mayan languages in Guatemala has increased in importance. In the 1996 Peace Accords the idea of officializing or co-officializing Mayan languages was introduced. Unfortunately in the 1999 referendum of the constitutional changes it was turned down. In May 2003, the Guatemala congress passed the "Law of National Languages" that, while it states that Spanish is the official language of Guatemala, the Law recognizes that indigenous languages are essential parts of the national identity which must be promoted. This is a considerable change from the Guatemalan Constitution, which only recognizes indigenous languages as a part of the "national patrimony."

The Mayans have taken a number of actions that are intended, in part, to address the problem of language status and language shift:

1. The establishment of the Academia de Lenguas Mayas de Guatemala is an autonomous state institution directed by Mayas.
2. The Academia's establishment of linguistic communities corresponds to the 21 Guatemalan Mayan languages.
3. The finding of several NGOs will be devoted to linguistic research by Mayas.
4. There will be an establishment of at least one foundation that addresses the community for language promotion.
5. There will be an increment of numbers of Mayas who are involved in the Ministry of Education bilingual education programs.
6. There will be an establishment of private "Maya schools" that will be intended to deliver appropriate education for Maya children.
7. There will be an organization of nongovernmental associations to support the Maya schools.
8. There will be an establishment of several Maya presses that promote publication in and about Mayan languages as well as other issues of concern.

== Phonology ==
=== Consonants ===
		Labial	Alveolar		Post- alveolar	Palatal	Velar	Uvular	Glottal
		Labial	plain	sibilant	Post- alveolar	Palatal	Velar	Uvular	Glottal
Plosive/ Affricate	voiceless	p	t	ts	tʃ		k	q	ʔ
Plosive/ Affricate	ejective	pʼ	tʼ	tsʼ	tʃʼ		kʼ	qʼ	
Plosive/ Affricate	implosive	ɓ							
Fricative				s	ʃ			χ	h
Nasal		m	n						
Trill			r						
Approximant	central		l			j	w		
Approximant	glottalized						(wʼ)		

- /k, kʼ/ can be palatalized as [kʲ, kʲʼ] in different environments.
- /ɓ/ can also occur freely as [wʼ] or [mʼ] in certain environments.
- Stops /p, t, k, q/ can be aspirated as [pʰ, tʰ, kʰ, qʰ] when in syllable-final position or before a consonant.
- /l, r, w, j/ are devoiced as [l̥, r̥, w̥, j̊] word-finally.
- /n/ assimilates to [ŋ] when before velar consonants.

=== Vowels ===
	Front	Central	Back
Close	i iː		u uː
Mid	e eː		o oː
Open		a aː	

== Grammar ==
In the journal Natural Language & Linguistic Theory it is noted that if subjects are realized as negative indefinite pronouns, they may also trigger agent focus. The Mayan languages differ with respect to the degree of how obligation for agent focus. In this case Poqomam's agent focus is optional in all relevant contexts.

{qu hamʼ wach} toʔ-w-i r-eh
nobody help-AF-INTR 3.ERG-DAT
'Nobody helped him'

== Samples ==
The following are everyday greetings in Poqomam. The translations are provided by the International Journal of American Linguistics:

- Hello - Nqakʼul ta awach
- Good Morning - Saqʼwa
- Good Afternoon - Sanaqʼiij
- Good Night - Qawaqʼaabʼ
- How are you? - Qanke jat wilkaat
- How did you wake up? - Qanke xtisaqʼwa
- Thank you - Tiyoox tii
- Bye - Xahʼoo
