= Western Popoloca language =

Oto-Manguean language spoken in Mexico

Western Popoloca
- Native to: Mexico
- Region: Puebla
- Native speakers: (7,000 cited 2000)
- Language family: Oto-Manguean: Popolocan; Chocho–Popoloca; Popoloca; Western Popoloca

Language codes
- ISO 639-3: Either: pow – San Felipe Otlaltepec pca – Santa Inés Ahuatempan
- Glottolog: sant1454 Santa Ines Ahuatempan sanf1264 San Felipe Otlaltepec

Western Popoloca is an indigenous language of Puebla state, Mexico. There are two principal varieties, sometimes counted as distinct languages,

- Santa Inés Ahuatempan Popoloca (a.k.a. Ahuatempan, Santa Inés)
- San Felipe Otlaltepec Popoloca (a.k.a. Otlaltepec, San Felipe)

which are about 75% mutually intelligible. Approximately half of ethnic Popoloca of these towns speak the language.

== Phonology ==
=== Vowels ===
	Front	Central	Back
Close	i, ĩ		u, ũ
Mid	e, ẽ		o, õ
Open		a, ã	

=== Consonants ===
		Labial	Alveolar		Post- alveolar	Retroflex	Palatal	Velar	Glottal
Nasal		m	n				ɲ		
Plosive		(p)	t					k	ʔ
Affricate			t͡s		t͡ʃ	t͡ʂ			
Fricative	voiceless		s		ʃ	ʂ			h
Fricative	voiced		z		ʒ	ʐ		ɣ	
Rhotic			ɾ	(r)					
Approximant		w	l				j		

Sounds [p, r] only occur from loanwords.
