= Perené Ashéninka =

Arawakan language

Ashéninka Perené
- Native to: Peru
- Native speakers: (5,500 cited 2001)
- Language family: Arawakan: Southern; Campa; Ashéninka; Ashéninka Perené

Language codes
- ISO 639-3: prq
- Glottolog: ashe1272

Ashéninka Perené or Ashéninca Perené is an indigenous American language of the Arawakan family spoken by the Asheninka people in Peru's Upper Perené river, a tributary of the Pachitea river.

== Classification ==
This variety of Ashéninka is somewhat mutually comprehensible with other Ashéninka languages.

== Name ==
Perené Ashéninka is sometimes called Perené Campa; Campa is considered an offensive term.

== Status ==
30% have some proficiency in Spanish while 40% have intermediate to advanced knowledge.

=== Official status ===
It is official in the area where it is the predominantly spoken language in line with the Peruvian constitution.

== Documentation ==
The language has had a grammar developed.

== Writing system ==
There is 30% literacy and 55% literacy for second language Spanish speakers.
