= Tai Viet (Unicode block) =

- Range: U+AA80..U+AADF (96 code points)
- Plane: BMP
- Scripts: Tai Viet
- Major alphabets: Tai Dam; Tai Dón; Thai Song
- Assigned: 72 code points
- Unused: 24 reserved code points

Unicode version history
- 5.2 (2009): 72 (+72)

Unicode documentation
- Code chart ∣ Web page

Tai Viet is a Unicode block containing characters for writing several of the Tai languages: Tai Dam, Tai Dón, and Thai Song.

Tai Viet^{[1]}^{[2]} Official Unicode Consortium code chart (PDF)
	0	1	2	3	4	5	6	7	8	9	A	B	C	D	E	F
U+AA8x	ꪀ	ꪁ	ꪂ	ꪃ	ꪄ	ꪅ	ꪆ	ꪇ	ꪈ	ꪉ	ꪊ	ꪋ	ꪌ	ꪍ	ꪎ	ꪏ
U+AA9x	ꪐ	ꪑ	ꪒ	ꪓ	ꪔ	ꪕ	ꪖ	ꪗ	ꪘ	ꪙ	ꪚ	ꪛ	ꪜ	ꪝ	ꪞ	ꪟ
U+AAAx	ꪠ	ꪡ	ꪢ	ꪣ	ꪤ	ꪥ	ꪦ	ꪧ	ꪨ	ꪩ	ꪪ	ꪫ	ꪬ	ꪭ	ꪮ	ꪯ
U+AABx	ꪰ	ꪱ	ꪲ	ꪳ	ꪴ	ꪵ	ꪶ	ꪷ	ꪸ	ꪹ	ꪺ	ꪻ	ꪼ	ꪽ	ꪾ	꪿
U+AACx	ꫀ	꫁	ꫂ													
U+AADx												ꫛ	ꫜ	ꫝ	꫞	꫟
Notes: 1. As of Unicode version 16.0; 2. Grey areas indicate non-assigned code points

== History ==
The following Unicode-related documents record the purpose and process of defining specific characters in the Tai Viet block:

Version	Final code points (Note: Proposed code points and characters names may differ from final code points and names)	Count	L2 ID	WG2 ID	Document
5.2	U+AA80..AAC2, AADB..AADF	72		N1996	Viet, Ngo Trung (1999-03-09), Proposal for encoding the Viet Tai script in ISO/IEC 10646
5.2	U+AA80..AAC2, AADB..AADF	72	L2/06-041		Viet, Ngo Trung; Brase, Jim (2006-01-30), Unified Tai Script for Unicode
5.2	U+AA80..AAC2, AADB..AADF	72	L2/07-008		Brase, Jim (2007-01-03), Workshop on Encoding and Digitizing Thai Scripts
5.2	U+AA80..AAC2, AADB..AADF	72	L2/07-056		Constable, Peter (2007-02-01), Comments on Viet Tay Proposal
5.2	U+AA80..AAC2, AADB..AADF	72	L2/07-039R		Brase, Jim (2007-02-06), Tay Viet Script for Unicode
5.2	U+AA80..AAC2, AADB..AADF	72	L2/07-015		Moore, Lisa (2007-02-08), "Tay Viet (revised) (C.21)", UTC #110 Minutes
5.2	U+AA80..AAC2, AADB..AADF	72	L2/07-099	N3220	Brase, Jim (2007-03-20), Proposal to encode the Tai Viet script in the UCS
5.2	U+AA80..AAC2, AADB..AADF	72	L2/07-100	N3221	Support for the proposal (N3220) to encode the Tai Viet script, 2007-03-21
5.2	U+AA80..AAC2, AADB..AADF	72	L2/07-118R2		Moore, Lisa (2007-05-23), "111-C17", UTC #111 Minutes
5.2	U+AA80..AAC2, AADB..AADF	72	L2/07-268	N3253 (pdf, doc)	Umamaheswaran, V. S. (2007-07-26), "M50.31", Unconfirmed minutes of WG 2 meeting 50, Frankfurt-am-Main, Germany; 2007-04-24/27
5.2	U+AA80..AAC2, AADB..AADF	72	L2/08-217		Brase, Jim (2008-05-09), Writing Tai Don - Additional characters needed for the Tai Viet script
5.2	U+AA80..AAC2, AADB..AADF	72	L2/08-318	N3453 (pdf, doc)	Umamaheswaran, V. S. (2008-08-13), "M52.2d", Unconfirmed minutes of WG 2 meeting 52
5.2	U+AA80..AAC2, AADB..AADF	72	L2/08-161R2		Moore, Lisa (2008-11-05), "Consensus 115-C15", UTC #115 Minutes, "Approve 4 character name corrections..."
