= Black Tai =

Tai Dam (or Black Tai) can refer to:

- Tai Dam language
- Tai Dam people
