= White Tai =

White Tai, or Tai Dón, may be:

- Tai Dón people
- Tai Dón language
