= Lao Song =

Total population
- 45,000

Regions with significant populations
- Thailand

Languages
- Lao Song, Thai, Isan

Religion
- Theravada Buddhism

Related ethnic groups
- Tai Dam, Lao, Thai, Dai

The Lao Song (Thai: ลาวโซ่ง, pronounced [lāːw sôːŋ]) are an ethnic group of Thailand. The Lao Song are also known as the Tai Song (ไทโซ่ง), Lao Song Dam (ลาวทรงดำ), or simply as the Song or Song Dam.

== History ==
The Lao Song are descendants of Lao peoples from the areas of Tonkin and areas east of Luang Prabang when they were forcibly removed to central Thailand as slaves and corvée labourers during Siamese annexation during the 18th and 19th centuries. Most were members of the Tai Dam ethnic group (counted by the Chinese government as members of the Dai ethnic group). The preservation of their traditional dress, language, and culture is notable in the face of Thaification policies. The Lao Song were used as guards for the royal courts and to help control the powerful Chinese minority, which explains their widespread distribution.

== Geographic distribution ==
There are approximately 34,000 Lao Song spread out over central Thailand, including Phetchabun, Phitsanulok, Nakhon Sawan, Ratchaburi, Suphan Buri, Kanchanaburi, Chumphon, and Nakhon Pathom Provinces.

== Religion ==
Although originally they believed in animism, most Lao Song are now Theravada Buddhists, but this often co-exists with the older religion.

== Economy ==
- Farming
- Handicrafts
