= Tai Dón =

Tai Don may be,

- Tai Dón people
- Tai Dón language
