= Dai people =

Ethnic group of Asia

Dai people 傣族
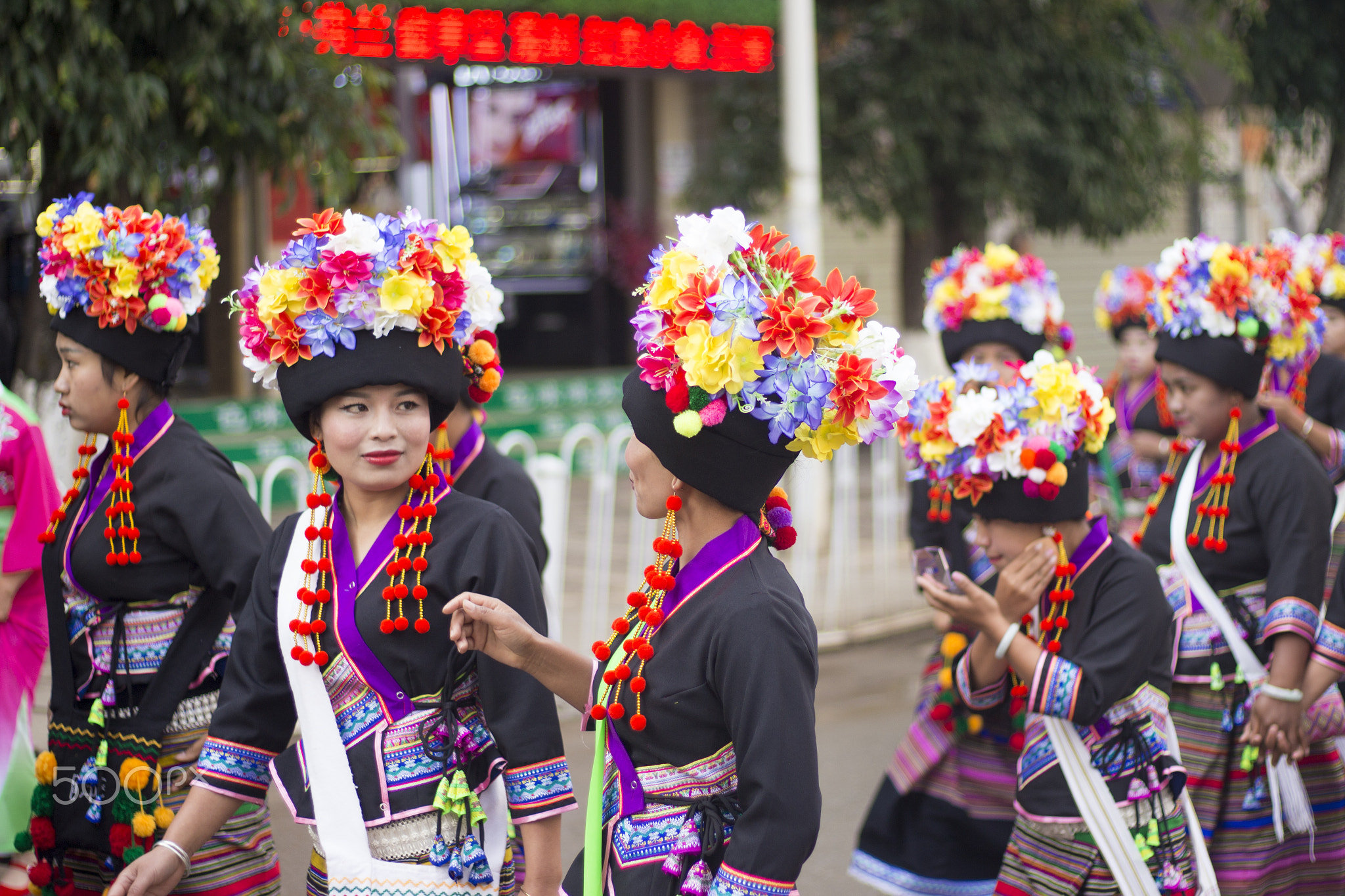
- Dai people celebrating 1380th Thai calendar New Year in Xishuangbanna, Yunnan

Total population
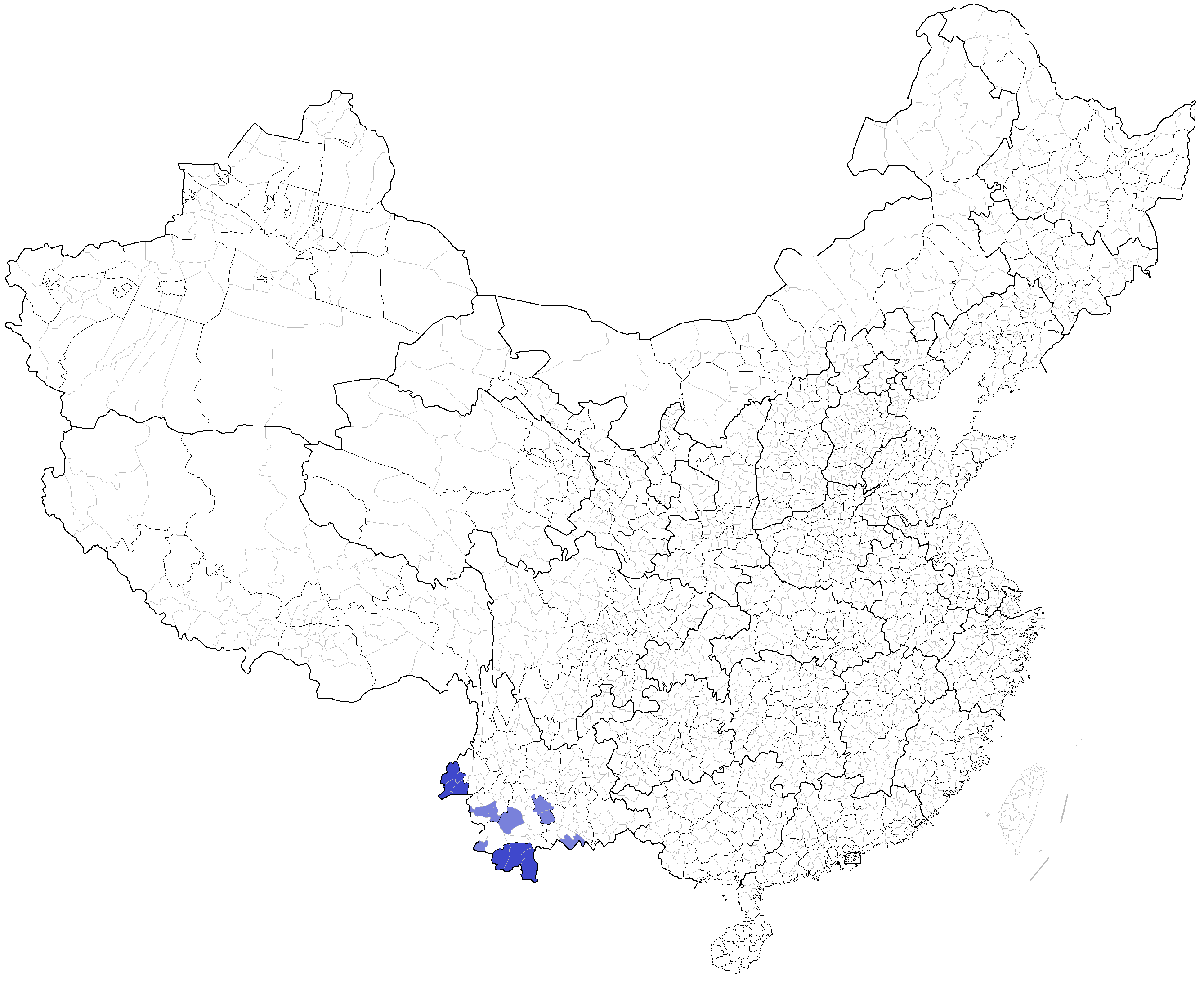
- 1,329,985 Distribution of Dai autonomous prefectures and counties in Mainland China

Languages
- Tai Lue, Tai Nuea, Tai Dam, Burmese, Mandarin Chinese, Vietnamese, Lao, Thai

Religion
- Theravada Buddhism; minority Dai folk religion • Islam

Related ethnic groups
- Zhuang people, Shan people, Thai people, Lao people

The Dai people (Burmese: ရှမ်းလူမျိုး; Tai Lü: ᨴᩱ/ᨴᩱ᩠ᨿ; Lao: ໄຕ; Thai: ไท; Shan: တႆး, [tai˥˩]; Tai Nüa: ᥖᥭᥰ, [tai˥]; Chinese: 傣族; pinyin: Dǎizú) are several Tai-speaking ethnic groups living in the Xishuangbanna Dai Autonomous Prefecture and the Dehong Dai and Jingpo Autonomous Prefecture of China's Yunnan Province. The Dai people form one of the 56 ethnic groups officially recognized by the People's Republic of China. By extension, the term can apply to groups in Laos, Vietnam, Thailand and Myanmar when Dai is used to mean specifically Tai Yai, Lue, Chinese Shan, Tai Dam, Tai Khao or even Tai in general. For other names, see the table below.

== Name ambiguity ==
The Dai people are closely related to the Shan, Lao and Thai people who form a majority in Laos and Thailand, and a large minority in Myanmar. Originally, the Tai, or Dai, lived closely together in modern Yunnan Province until political chaos and wars in the north at the end of the Tang and Song dynasty and various nomadic peoples prompted some to move further south into modern Laos then Thailand. As with many other officially recognized ethnic groups in China (See Gaoshan and Yao), the term Dai, at least within Chinese usage, is an umbrella term and as such has no equivalent in Tai languages, who have only more general terms for 'Tai peoples in general' (e.g., Tai Lue: tai˥˩. This term refers to all Dai people, not including Zhuang) and 'Tai people in China' (e.g., Thai: ชาวไทในจีน'), both of which include the Zhuang, for example, which is not the case in the Chinese and more specific terms, as shown in the table below. Therefore the word Dai, like with the aforementioned Yao, is a Han Chinese cultural concept which has now been adopted by other languages such as English, French, and German (see respective Wikipedias). As a solution in the Thai language, however, as in English, the term Tai Lue can be used to mean Dai, despite referring to other groups as in the table below. This is because the two main groups actually bear the same name, both meaning 'Northern Tai' (lue and nüa are cognate).

Although they are officially recognized as a single people by the Chinese state, these Tai people form several distinct cultural and linguistic groups. The two main languages of the Dai are Dai Lü (Sibsongbanna Dai) and Dai Nüa (Daihong Dai); two other written languages used by the Dai are Tày Pong and Tai Dam. They all are Tai languages, a group of related languages that includes Thai, Lao and Zhuang and part of the Tai–Kadai language family. Various languages of the Tai-Kadai language family are spoken from Assam in India to Hainan and Guizhou in China. The Dai people follow their traditional religion as well as Theravada Buddhism and maintain similar customs and festivals (such as Songkran) to the other Tai-speaking peoples and more broadly, in regards to some cultural aspects, to the unrelated dominant ethnic groups of Myanmar, Cambodia and Sri Lanka. They are among the few native groups in China who nominally practice the Theravada school of Buddhism. The term Tai in China is also used sometimes to show that the majority of people subsumed under the "Dai" nationality are mainly speakers of Thai languages (i.e. Southwestern Tai languages). Some use the term Daizurian to refer specifically to the sinicized Tai people living in Yunnan. The term is derived from the Chinese term 傣族人; pinyin: Dǎizúrén which is translated in Shan as တႆးၸူး taj4 tsuu4 meaning "the Tai who are in association/united".

== Tai subgroups ==
Chinese	Pinyin	Tai Lü	Tai Nüa	Thai	Conventional	Area(s)
傣泐 （西雙版納傣族自治州）	Dǎilè (Xīshuāngbǎnnà Dǎi)	tai˥˩ lɯː˩		ไทลื้อ	Tai Lü (Tai Lue, Lue)	Sipsongpanna Tai Autonomous Prefecture, Laos, Thailand, Burma, Vietnam
傣那 （德宏傣）	Dǎinà (Déhóng Dǎi)	tai˥˩ nəː˥	tai le6	ไทเหนือ, ไทใต้คง, ไทใหญ่	Tai Nüa (Northern Tai, Upper Tai, Chinese Shan, Tai Yai)	Dehong Burma, Thailand
傣擔	Dǎidān	tai˥˩ dam˥		ไทดำ, ลาวโซ่ง, ไททรงดำ	Tai Dam (Black Tai, Tai Lam, Lao Song Dam*, Tai Muan, Tai Tan, Black Do, Jinping Dai, Tai Den, Tai Do, Tai Noir, Thai Den)	Jinping (金平), Laos, Thailand
傣繃	Dǎibēng	tai˥˩pɔːŋ˥		ไทเบิ้ง, ไทมาว, ไทใหญ่	Tay Pong	Ruili, Gengma, Lincang along the Mekong
傣端	Dǎiduān	tai˥˩doːn˥		ไทขาว	White Tai, Tày Dón (Tai Khao, Tai Kao, Tai Don, Dai Kao, White Dai, Red Tai, Tai Blanc, Tai Kaw, Tày Lai, Thai Trang)	Jinping (金平)
傣雅	Dǎiyǎ	tai˥˩jaː˧˥		ไทหย่า	Tai Ya (Tai Cung, Cung, Ya)	Xinping (新平), Yuanjiang (元江)
傣友	Dǎiyǒu	tai˥˩jiu˩		ไทโยว	Tai Yo	Yuanyang (元阳), along the Red River
* lit. "Lao [wearing] black trousers"

== Languages ==
Peoples classified as Dai in China speak the following Southwestern Tai languages.

- Tai Lü language (傣仂语; Dǎilè Yǔ)
- Tai Nüa language (德宏傣语; Déhóng Dǎiyǔ; Shan language)
- Tai Dam language (傣哪语 / 傣担语; Dǎinǎ Yǔ / Dǎidān Yǔ)
- Tai Ya language (傣雅语; Dǎiyǎ Yǔ) or Tai Hongjin (红金傣语; Hóngjīndǎi Yǔ)

Yunnan (1998:150) lists 4 major Tai language varieties.

- Tai Lü language (傣泐方言): 400,000 speakers in Sipsongpanna, Menglian County, Jinggu County, Jiangcheng County, etc.
- Tai Nüa language (傣纳方言): 400,000 speakers in Dehong, Gengma, Shuangjiang, Tengchong, Baoshan, Longling, Changning, Cangyuan, Lancang, Zhenkang, Jingdong, etc.
- Tai Rui (傣端方言): 40,000 speakers in Jinping, Maguan, Malipo counties, etc.
- Tianxin (田心方言): 20,000 speakers in Wuding, Luquan, Yongren, Dayao counties, etc. Representative dialect: Tianxin (田心), Wuding County

== History ==
=== Early period ===
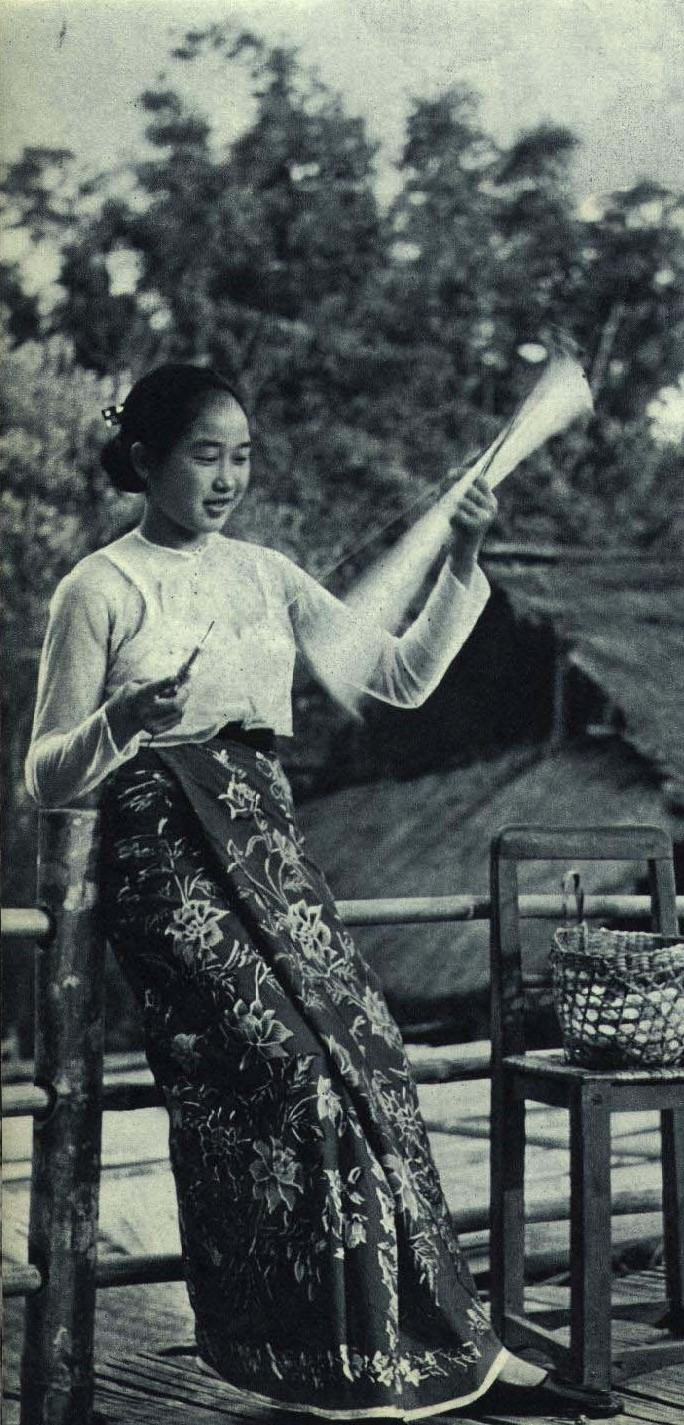
1962 photograph of a Dai girl weaving silk in Dehong Prefecture, Yunnan

In 109 BCE, the Han dynasty established the Yizhou prefecture in the southwest of Yi (modern day parts of Yunnan, Sichuan, and Guizhou). In the twelfth century, the Dai (called Dai-Lue or Tai-Lue at this period) established the Jinghong Golden Hall Kingdom in Sipsong Panna (modern Xishuangbanna). Jinghong was the capital of this kingdom. The population of the kingdom was over one million and recognized the Chinese as their sovereign according to local records. The king had political and economic power and controlled most of the land and local water system.

=== Yuan and Ming period ===
During the Yuan dynasty, the Dai became subordinate to Yunnan (itself recently conquered by the Mongols). Hereditary leaders were appointed by the authorities among the minorities of the region. This system continued under the Ming dynasty and the feudal systems during this period allowed manorial lords to establish political power along with its own army, prisons, and courts. However, some Dai communities had their own aspects of class, political structures, and land ownership that differed considerably from other groups. Also during the Ming dynasty, eight Dai tusi (chieftains) controlled the region with each having their own economic and political power. Although Buddhism has had a presence in Yunnan since at least the seventh century, the Dai converted to Theravada Buddhism during the fifteenth and sixteenth centuries.

=== Qing and modern China ===
The Qing dynasty kept the Yuan and Ming system intact but with some differences. The Qing had more economic power in the region and routinely sent officials to the area for direct supervision and control. This well-established system was only fully replaced by the Chinese government in 1953. 1953 also marked the end of the ancient ruling family that was in place since the Jinghong Kingdom. The last king, Chao Hmoam Gham Le (Dao Shixun in Chinese) became the deputy head of Xishuangbanna prefecture.

== Exodus ==
The original areas of the Tai Lue included both sides of the Mekong River in the Sipsongpanna. According to the Tai Lue, there were five city-states on the east bank and six on the west, which with Jinghong formed twelve rice field divisions with all twelve having another 32 small provinces. These were:

On the west bank - Rung, Ha, Sae, Lu, Ong, Luang, Hun, Phan, Chiang Choeng, Hai, Chiang Lo and Mang; On the east bank - La, Bang, Hing, Pang, La, Wang, Phong, Yuan, Bang and Chiang Thong (present-day Luang Prabang). (These names are transcribed according to their Thai pronunciations not their Tai Lue (Dai) pronunciations. If transcribed according to their Tai Lue pronunciations they would be as follows: Hung, Ha, Sae, Lu, Ong, Long, Hun, Pan, Cheng Choeng, Hai, Cheng Lo, Mang, La, Bang, Hing, Pang, La, Wang, Pong, Yon, Bang and Cheng Tong)

Some portions of these Tai Lue either voluntarily moved or were forcibly herded from these city-states around one to two hundred years ago, arriving in countries of present-day Burma, Laos and Thailand.

== Cuisine ==
The staple food of the Dai people is rice. Dai people in the Dehong area mainly eat japonica rice.

Bamboo rice is a famous snack of the Dai people. It is made by putting glutinous rice in a fragrant bamboo tube, soaking with water for 15 minutes, and baking with fire. Pineapple purple rice is also a well-known Dai dish.

Raw, fresh, sour, and spicy are the characteristics of Dai cuisine. Dai people believe that eating sour foods can make their eyes bright, help digestion, and also help relieve heat. Sweet can remove fatigue. Spicy can increase appetite. Acid is considered the most delicious flavor in Dai cuisine, and all dishes and snacks are mainly sour, such as sour bamboo shoots, sour pork.

== Tai Lue in Thailand ==
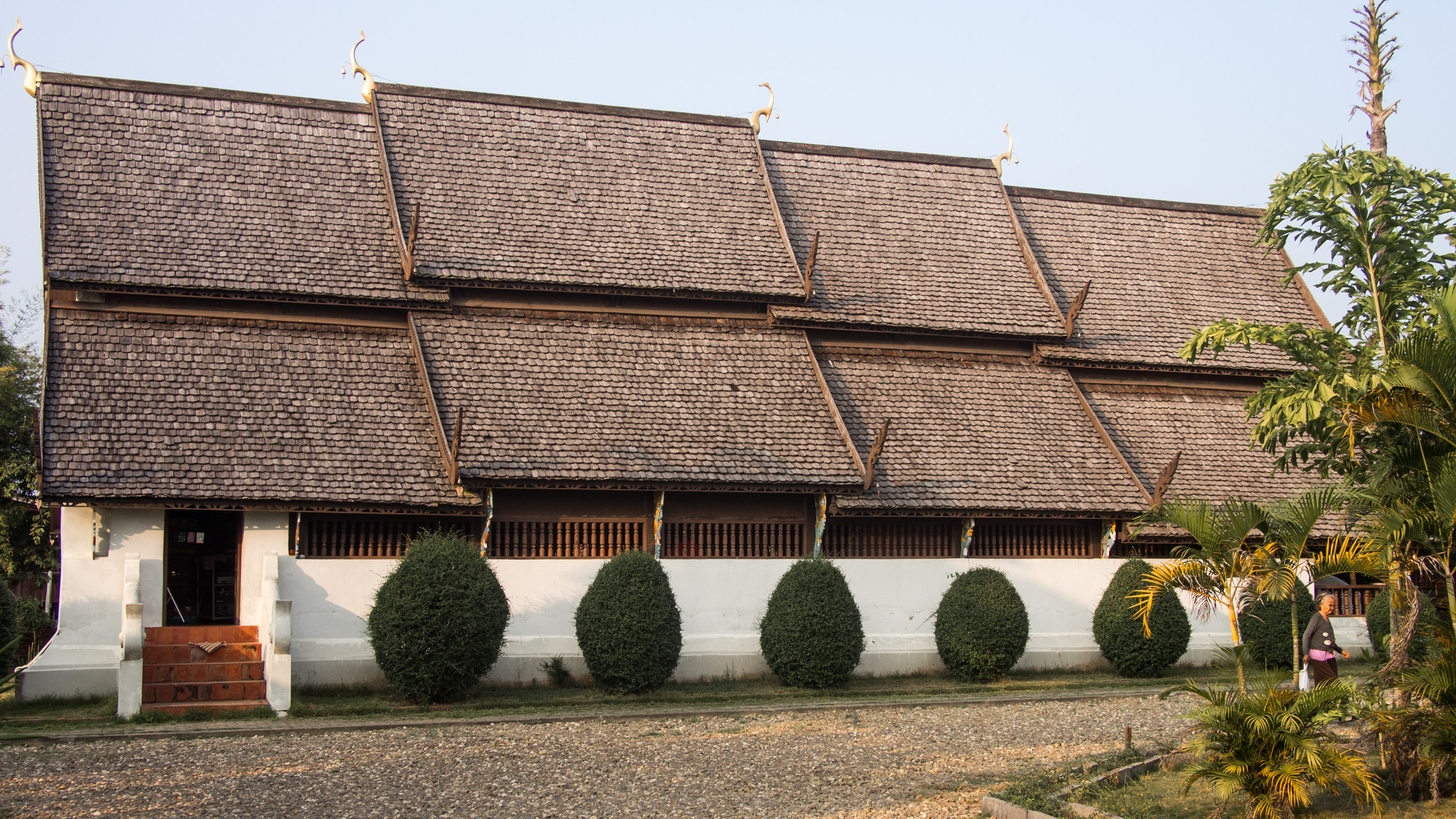
Wat Rong Ngae is a Thai Lue temple in Pua District, Nan Province

In Thailand there are Tai Lue in many provinces of the upper regions of Northern Thailand; these provinces are:

- Chiang Rai: Mae Sai, Chiang Khong and Chiang Saen districts (a portion fled to Chiang Rung at the outbreak of the Ayuthian-Burman War)
- Chiang Mai: Samoeng and Doi Saket districts
- Nan: Tha Wang Pha, Pua, Chiang Klang and Thung Chang districts (the greatest number, fleeing from the Saiyaburi and Sipsongpanna regions)
- Phayao: Chiang Muan and Chiang Kham districts (many in number)
- Lampang: Mueang Lampang and Mae Tha districts
- Lamphun: Mueang Lamphun and Ban Thi districts

== Festival ==
The festivals of the Dai people are mostly related to religious activities. The main festivals include door closing festival, door opening festival and water splashing festival.

The closing festival is fixed on September 15 in the Dai calendar (the middle of July in the Gregorian calendar). The opening door festival, the time fixed in the Dai calendar on December 15 (the middle of October in the Gregorian calendar). In the two festivals on the same day, all of people will go to the Buddhist temple to hold ritual activities. People will offer foods, flowers and coins to the Buddha. The three months between the closing door festival and the opening door festival are the "close" time of the year, the most religious time of the year.

The Water Splashing Festival is a traditional festival of the Dai people, meaning the New Year of June. The time is in the late June or early July of the Dai calendar (the middle of April in the Gregorian calendar). Held about 10 days after the Qingming festival, it symbolizes "the most beautiful day". The holiday usually lasts three days. In the early morning of the festival, the people of the Dai village went to the Buddhist temple to clean the figure of Buddha. After the ceremony of the Buddhist temple, the young men and women pour water on each other. Then groups of people marched around, sprinkling pedestrians as a blessing. These represent blessings.

== Culture ==
=== Religion ===
The Dai are predominately Theravada Buddhists. Dai Buddhism also tolerated many pre—Buddhist animistic beliefs and practices. The Dai were animists before Buddhism became popular and their belief in natural spirits continues. Until very recently, every Dai village had at least one Buddhist temple while larger villages had two to five temples. Many of their Buddhist temples were destroyed during the Cultural Revolution. Parents commonly sent their sons (from 7 to 18 years old) to the Buddhist monasteries to become novices and to receive monastic education. The boys stay in the monasteries for three years or more while learning how to write, read, and practice the faith. Afterwards, most boys or young men would return to secular society while a handful of them remained in the monasteries to become fully ordained monks. This education system has led to high literacy rates and knowledge of the Dai script among Dai men that today exceed 80 percent.

==== Islam ====
A small minority of Dai practice Islam. These specific Dai are often called "Dai Paxi" or "Dai Hui". Hui (Chinese Muslim) merchants from Dali and other parts of Yunnan settled in Xishuangbanna in the early nineteenth century. These settlers assimilated and intermarried with the locals which eventually led to the creation of a unique Dai and Sino-Islamic culture. The present Parshi Dai have a material culture identical to their Buddhist counterparts. They speak the same language, wear similar dress, have similar customs, rituals, and diet.

=== Literature and science ===
The Dai have historically had a rich array of astronomical and literary works. The Dai have their own calendar that begins in the year 638 and have many astronomical books on calculating solar and lunar eclipses (most written in Dai script). Historical documents, legends, stories, poetry, fables, and children's stories are also plentiful.

=== Dwellings ===
Traditional Dai villages are mainly located in bamboo plains near rivers or streams. Dai homes are usually built on stilts and some are square in shape. A few houses are two-story with the upper story being the living space and the bottom story as a storehouse. The bottom story can sometimes be wall-less.

=== Economy ===
As an effect of living in a subtropical region, subsistence for many Dai include the use and growing of rice, coffee, rubber, tea, sugar, and many types of fruits. The Dai also have a highly developed handicraft industry which includes weaving, oil-pressing, winemaking, and bamboo work. Since the 1980s, tourism has become a source of revenue for the Dai in Xishuangbanna in consequence of airports being built in Jinghong and Mangshi. The increase of infrastructure and living standards in the region has led the Dai to assimilate into the mainstream Chinese economy better than other minorities.

=== Marriage and women's roles ===
Historically, marriage was mainly between members of similar social or economic class and polygamy was common among chieftains. Dai society has traditionally been patriarchal with women having low status and unable to inherit property. Girls (from age 7 or 8) were responsible for caring for younger children and domestic duties. When they became older, working in the rice fields to clear weeds, harvest, plant, etc. was included into their responsibilities. Today, Dai women and youth have more freedoms then they did in the past and some women (with access to education) have entered into professional careers like teaching or nursing.

== Gallery ==
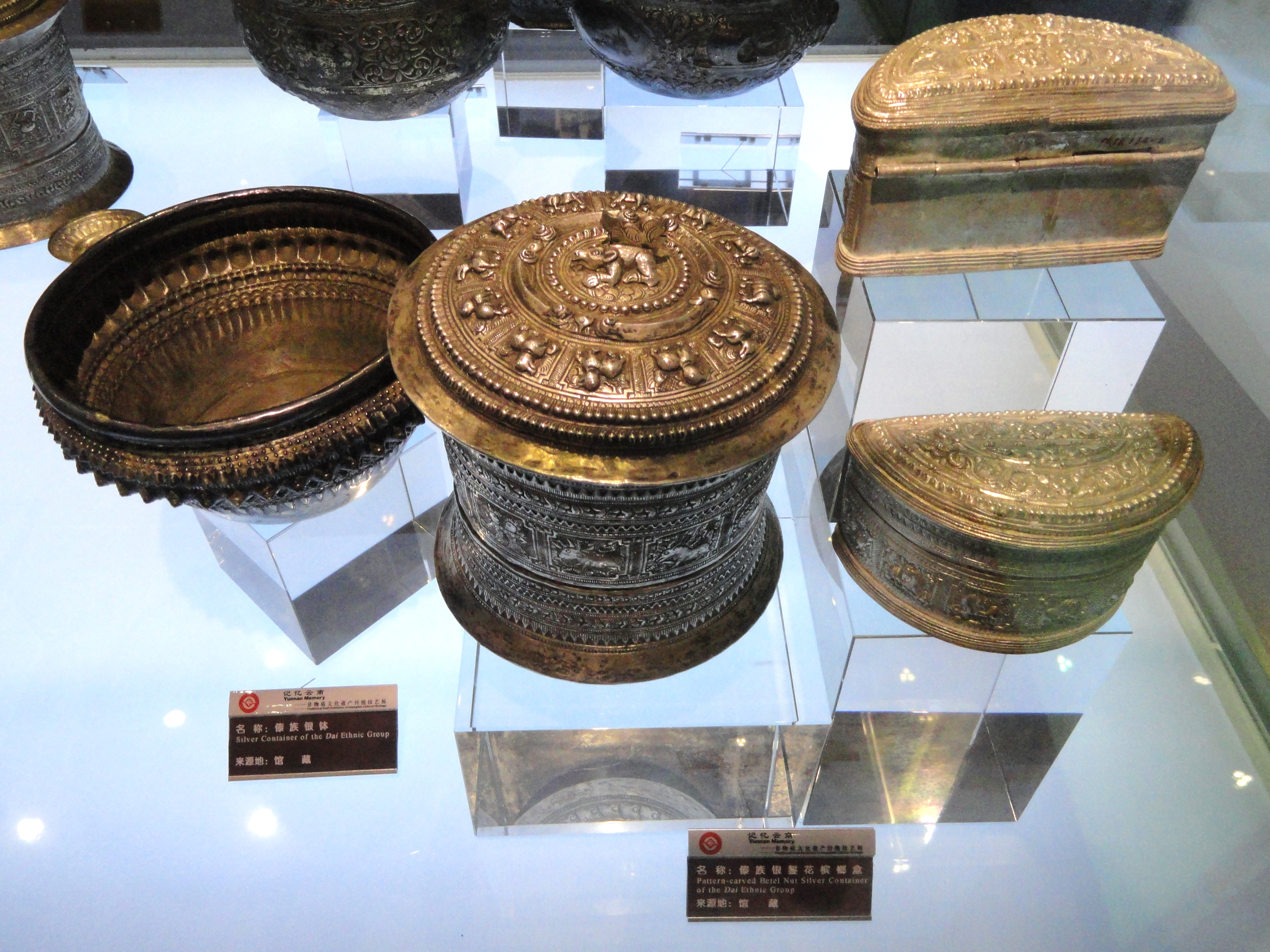
Dai containers (silver). Metalwork in the Yunnan Provincial Museum.

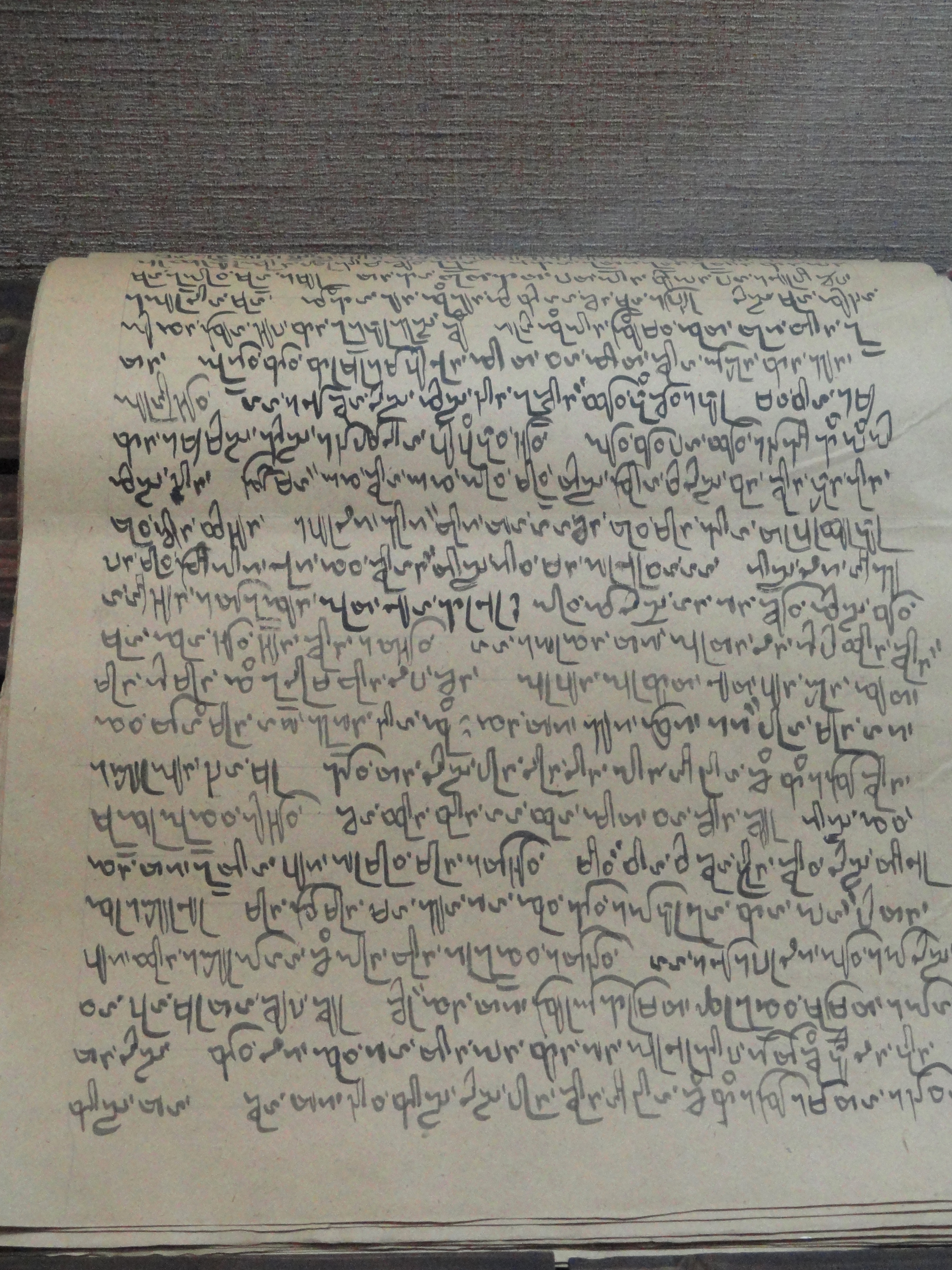
Dai Buddhist text. Manuscripts / writing systems in the Yunnan Nationalities Museum

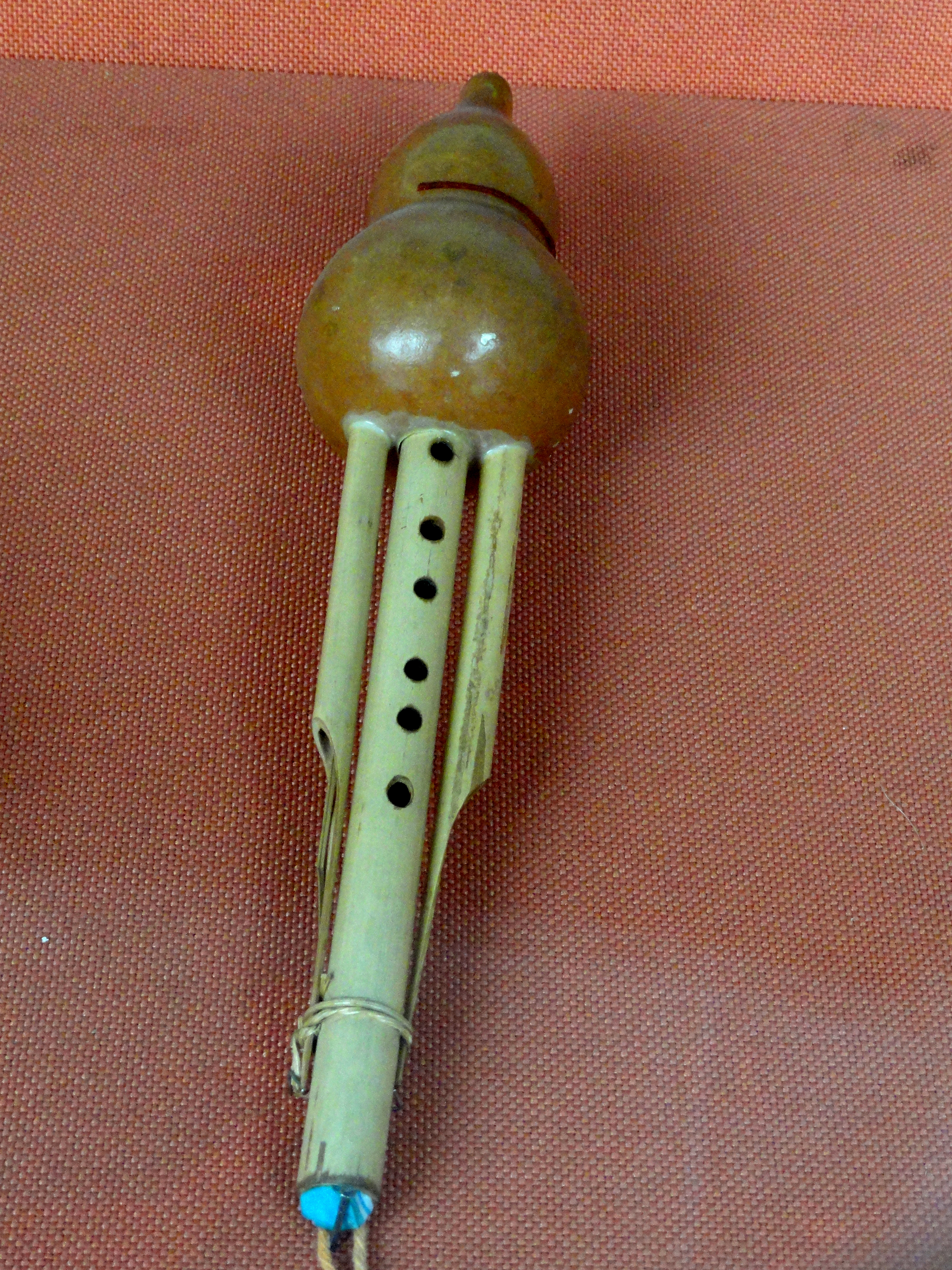
Dai gourd pipes, also known as the hulusi, in the Yunnan Nationalities Museum

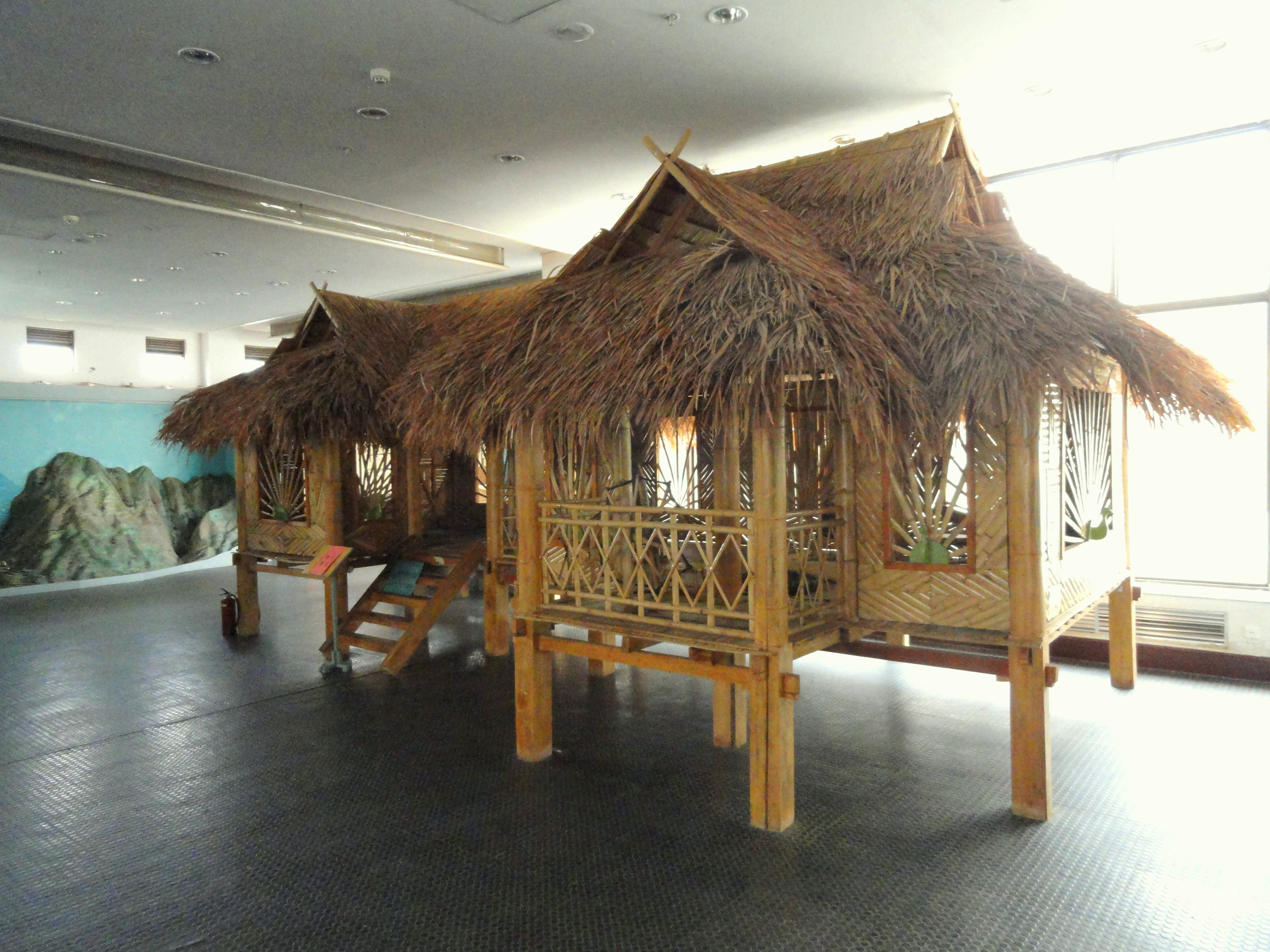
Dai bamboo house. Tools and utensils in the Yunnan Nationalities Museum, Kunming, Yunnan, China.

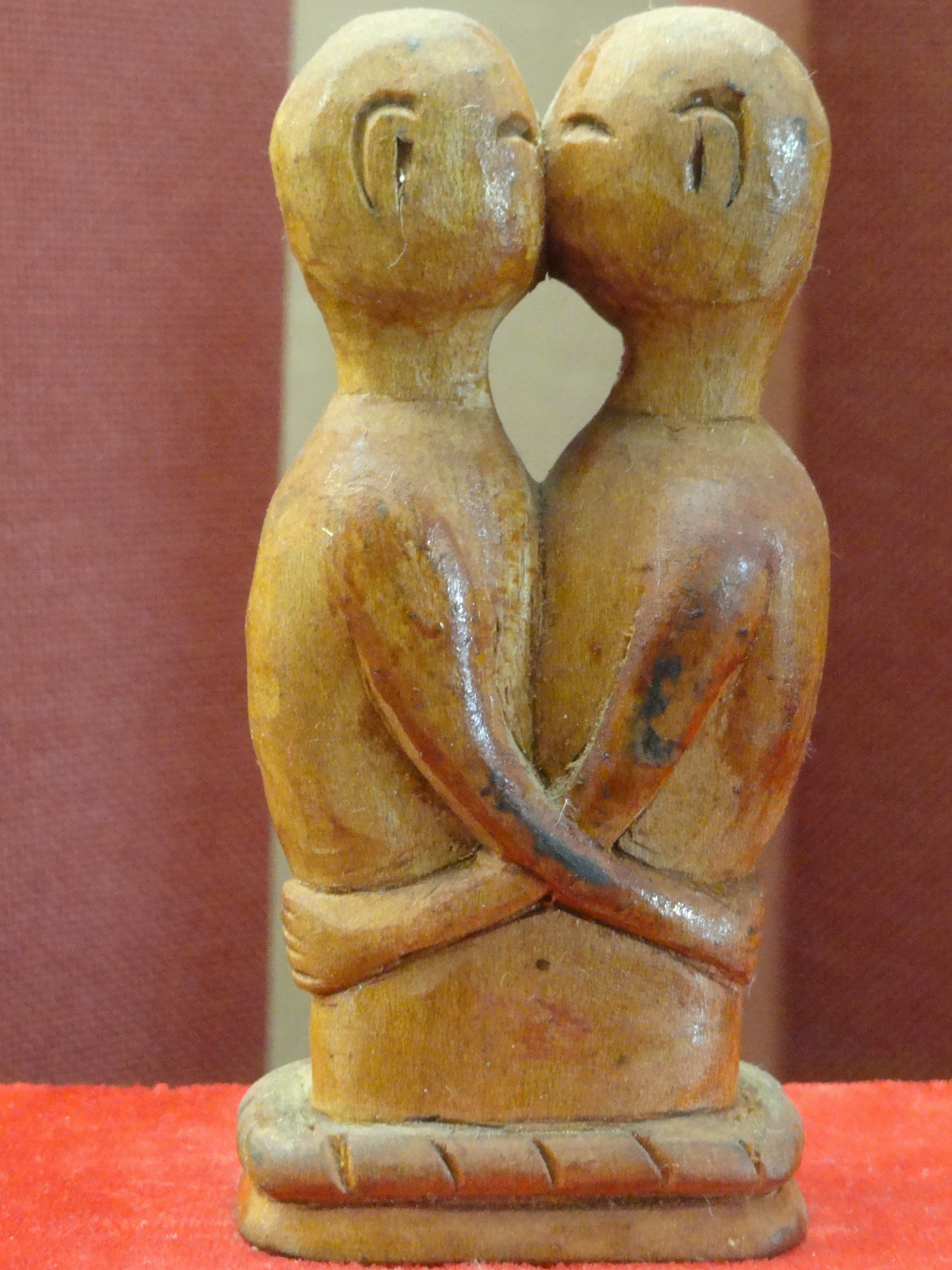
Dai copulating figurines. Folk Arts in the Yunnan Nationalities Museum

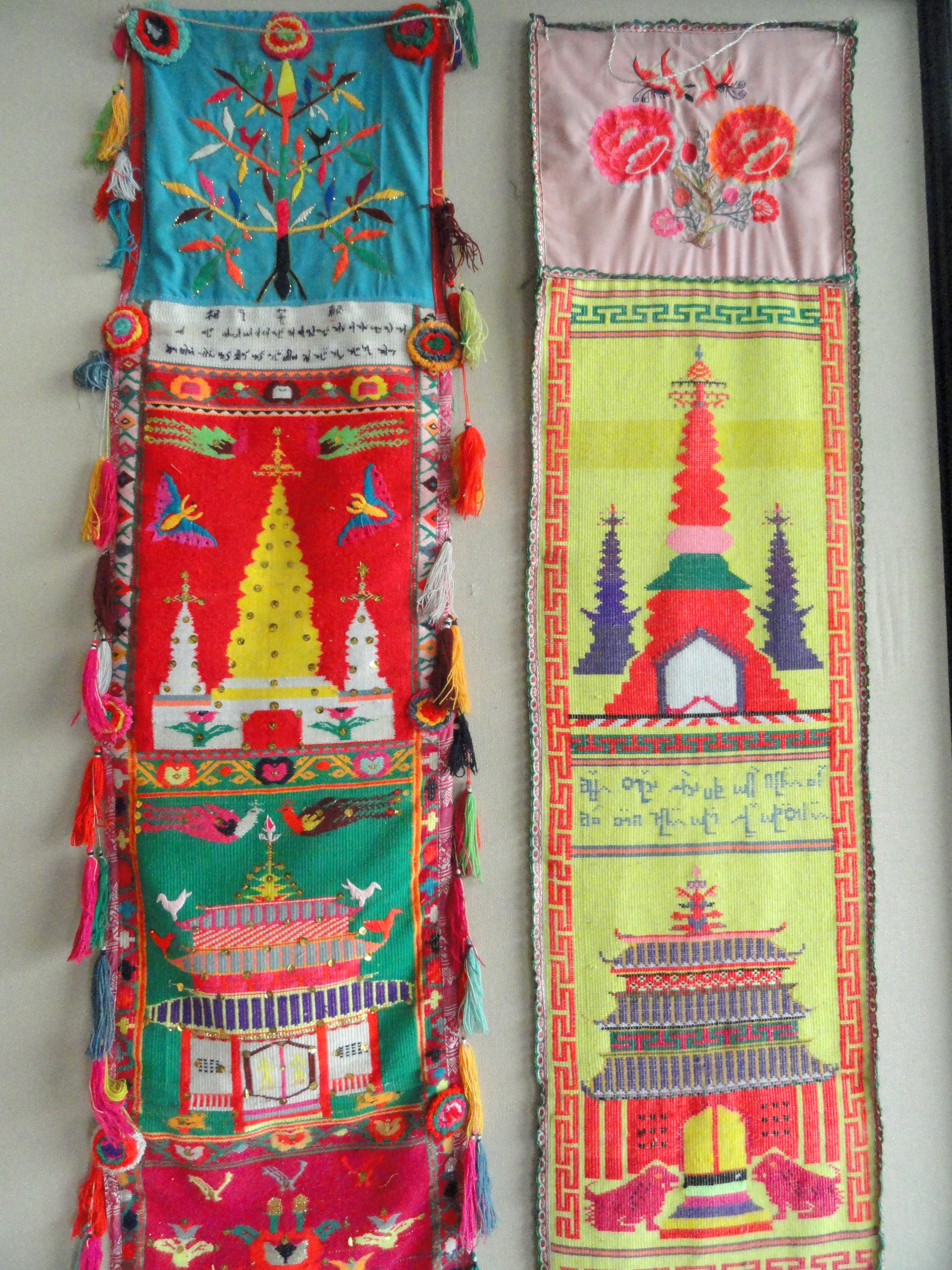
Dai Buddhist streamer. Folk Arts in the Yunnan Nationalities Museum

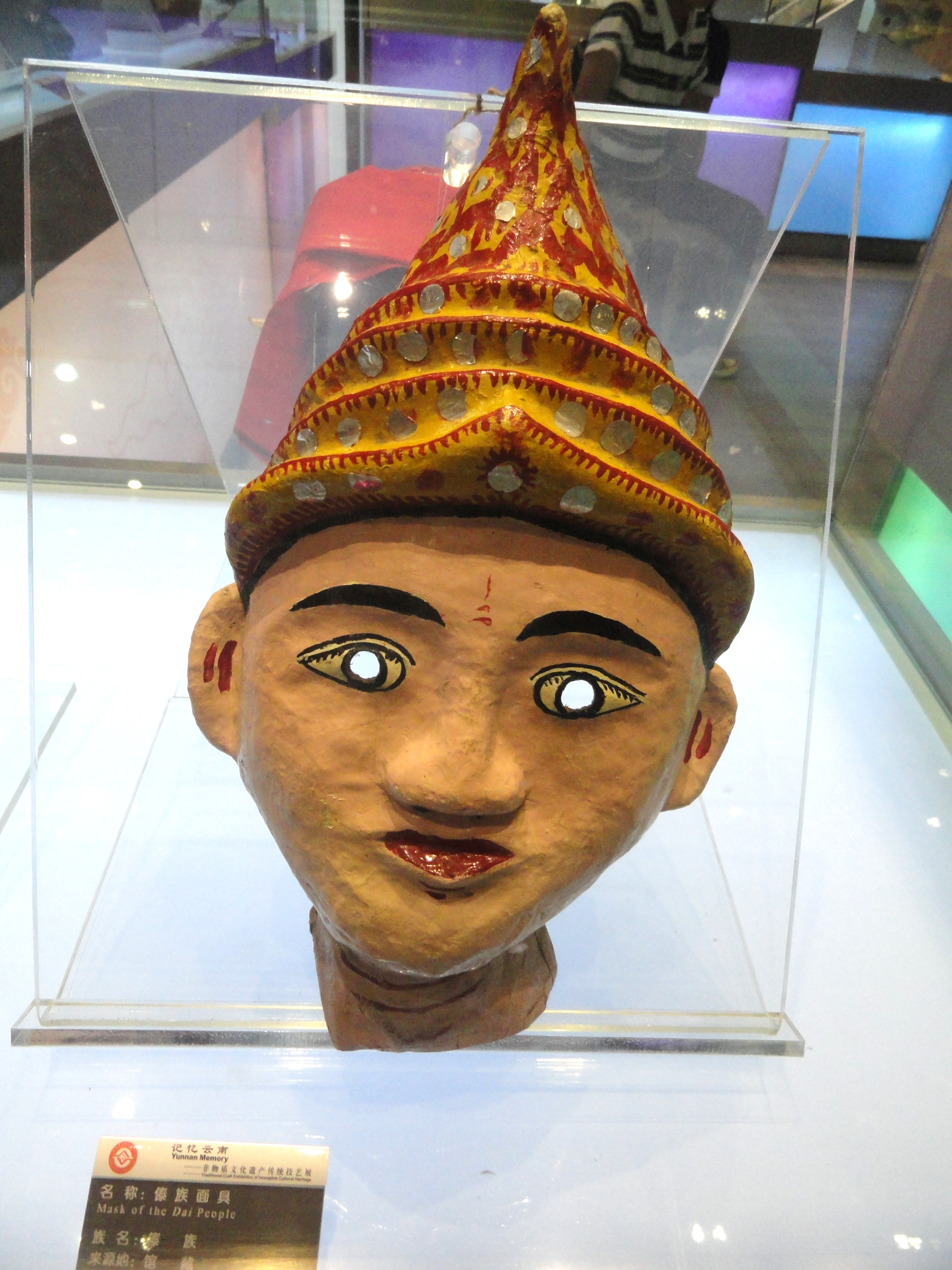
Dai mask. Exhibit in the Yunnan Provincial Museum

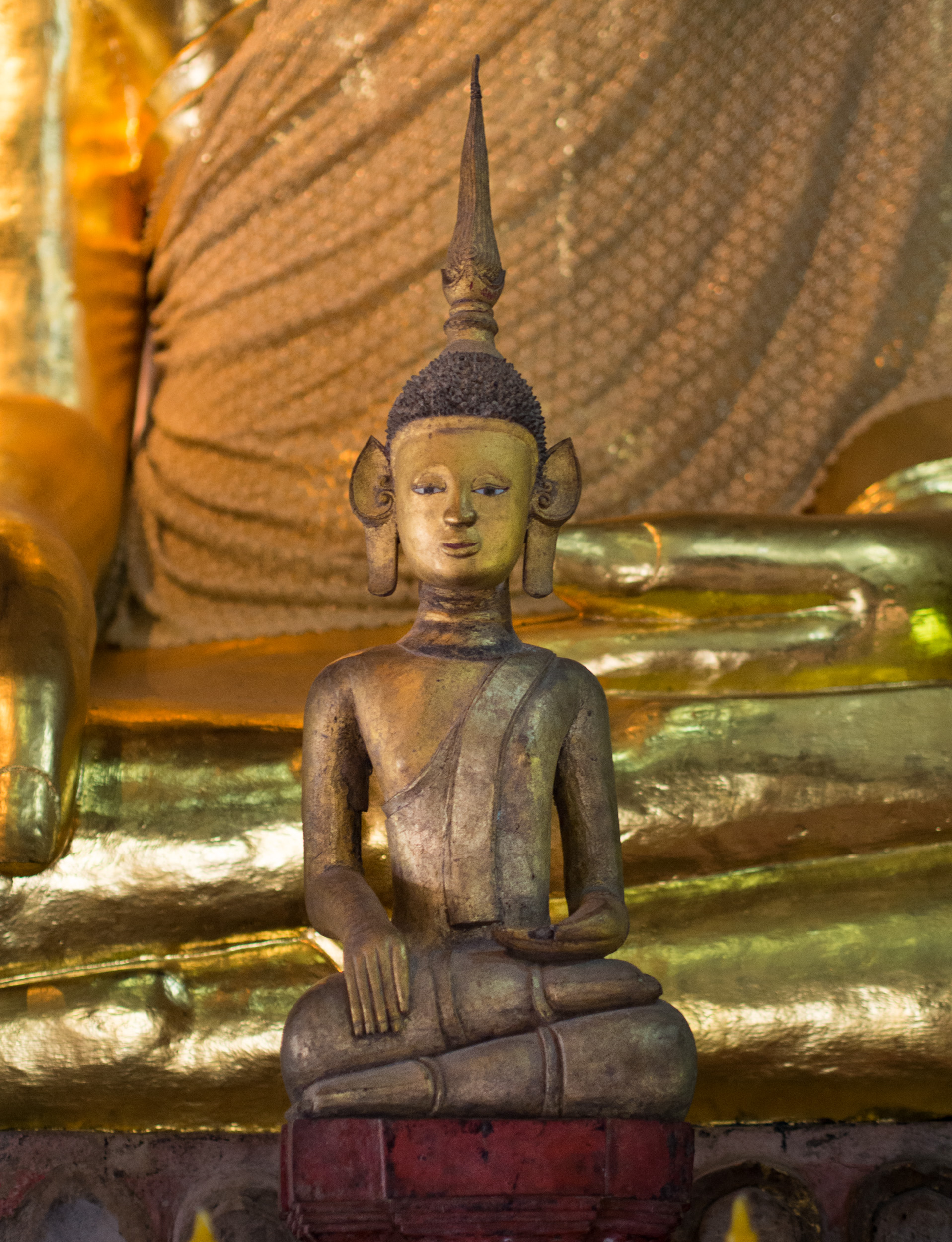
A wooden Thai Lue Buddha statue in Tha Wang Pha District, Nan province, Thailand

== See also ==
- Tai peoples
- Thái people (Vietnam)
- Rau peoples
