= Tai Viet script =

Standardized script for the Tai Dam, Thai Song, Tai Dón and Tai Daeng languages

Tai Viet ꪎꪳ ꪼꪕ
- "Tai Dam" in Tai Viet script
- Script type: Abugida
- Period: 16th century-present
- Direction: Left-to-right
- Languages: Tai Dam, Tai Daeng, Tai Dón, Thai Song and Tày Tac

Related scripts
- Parent systems: Egyptian hieroglyphs: Phoenician; Aramaic; Brahmi; Tamil-Brahmi; Pallava; Old Khmer; Sukhothai; Tai Viet

ISO 15924
- ISO 15924: Tavt (359), Tai Viet

Unicode
- Unicode alias: Tai Viet
- Unicode range: U+AA80–U+AADF

The Tai Viet script (Tai Dam: ꪎꪳ ꪼꪕ ("Tai script"), Vietnamese: Chữ Thái Việt, Thai: อักษรไทดำ, RTGS: akson taidam) is a Brahmic script used by the Tai Dam people and various other Thai people in Vietnam and Thailand.

== History ==
According to Thai authors, the writing system is probably derived from the old Thai writing of the kingdom of Sukhotai. It has been suggested that the Fakkham script is the source of the Tai Don, Tai Dam and Tai Daeng writing systems found in Jinping (China), northern Laos, and Vietnam.

Differences in phonology of the various local Tai languages, the isolation of communities and the fact that the written language has traditionally been passed down from father to son have led to many local variants. In an attempt to reverse this development and establish a standardized system, Vietnam's various Tai people in the former Northwestern Autonomous Region were approached with a proposal that they should agree on a common standard. Together with Vietnamese researchers, a first proposal called Thống Nhất (or Unified Alphabet) was developed, which was published in 1961 and revised in 1966. A unified and standardized version of the script was developed at a UNESCO-sponsored workshop in 2006, named "chữ Thái Việt Nam" (or Vietnamese Tai script). This standardized version was then approved to be included in Unicode.

From May 2008, the improved Thai script was put into official use.

== Description ==
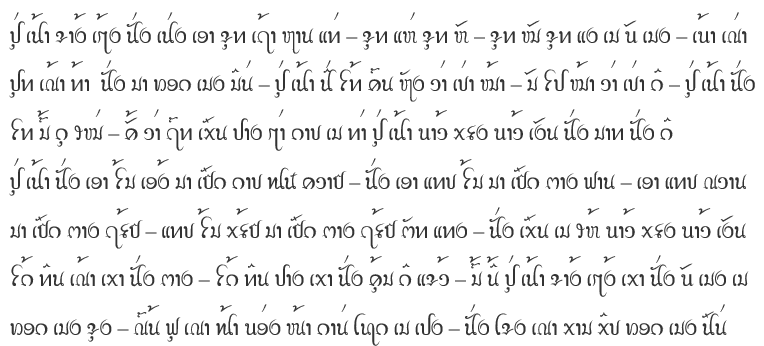
A text in Tai Viet script

The script consists of 48 consonants and 14 vowels. Unlike most other abugidas or brahmic scripts, the consonants do not have an inherent vowel, and every vowel must be specified with a vowel marker. Vowels are marked with diacritic vowel markers that can appear above, below or to the left and/or right of the consonant. Some vowels carry an inherent final consonant, such as /-aj/, /-am/, /-an/ and /-əw/.

The script uses Latin script punctuation, and also includes five special characters, one to indicate a person, one for the number "one", one to repeat the previous word, one to mark the beginning of a text and one to mark the end of a text.

Traditionally, the script did not use any spacing between words as they were written in a continuous flow, but spacing has become common since the 1980s.

=== Consonants ===
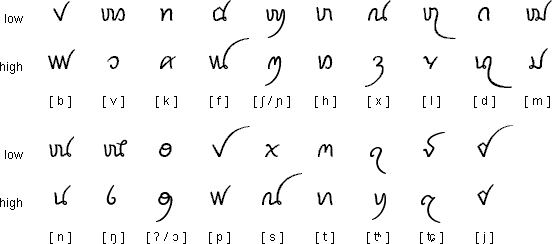
Tai Viet script consonants

Initial consonant letters have both high and low forms, which are used to indicate tones. The high consonants are used for the syllable final letters -w, -y, -m, -n and -ng. The low consonant letter -k is used for final /k/- and /ʔ/-sounds, while low consonant letters -b and -d are used for final /p/ and /t/.

Character		Name	Sound
Low	High	Name	Sound
ꪀ	ꪁ	ko	/k/
ꪂ	ꪃ	kho	/kʰ/
ꪄ	ꪅ	khho	/x/
ꪆ	ꪇ	go	/ɡ/
ꪈ	ꪉ	ngo	/ŋ/
ꪊ	ꪋ	co	/tɕ/
ꪌ	ꪍ	cho	/tɕʰ/
ꪎ	ꪏ	so	/s/
ꪐ	ꪑ	nyo	/ɲ/
ꪒ	ꪓ	do	/d/
ꪔ	ꪕ	to	/t/
ꪖ	ꪗ	tho	/tʰ/

Character		Name	Sound
Low	High	Name	Sound
ꪘ	ꪙ	no	/n/
ꪚ	ꪛ	bo	/b/
ꪜ	ꪝ	po	/p/
ꪞ	ꪟ	pho	/pʰ/
ꪠ	ꪡ	fo	/f/
ꪢ	ꪣ	mo	/m/
ꪤ	ꪥ	yo	/j/
ꪦ	ꪧ	ro	/r/
ꪨ	ꪩ	lo	/l/
ꪪ	ꪫ	vo	/v/
ꪬ	ꪭ	ho	/h/
ꪮ	ꪯ	o	/ʔ/

=== Vowels ===
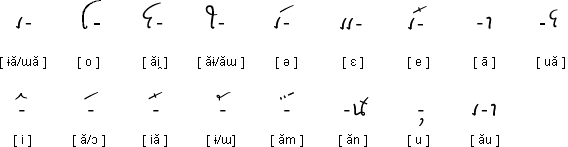
Tai Viet script vowels

The consonant character's position is marked with a circle: ◌.

Character	Name	Sound
◌ꪰ	mai kang	/a/
◌ꪱ	aa	/aː/
◌ꪲ	i	/i/
◌ꪳ	ue	/ɨ/
◌ꪴ	u	/u/
ꪵ◌	ee	/ɛ/
ꪶ◌	o	/o/
◌ꪷ	mai khit	/ɔ/*

Character	Name	Sound
◌ꪸ	ia	/iə̯/
ꪹ◌	uea	/ɨə̯/
◌ꪺ	ua	/uə̯/
ꪻ◌	aue	/əw/
ꪼ◌	ay	/aj/
◌ꪽ	an	/an/
◌ꪾ	am	/am/

- When /ɔ/ has a final, ◌ꪮ is used instead.

Some additional vowels are written with a combination of two vowel characters. The following four combinations are used for Tai Dam:

Character	Sound
ꪹ◌ꪸ	/e/
ꪹ◌ꪷ	/ə/
ꪹ◌ꪱ	/aw/
◌ꪚꪾ	/ap/

Some sounds are spelled differently in Tai Dón compared to in Tai Dam:

Character	Compare with Tai Dam	Sound
◌ꪸ	ꪹ◌ꪸ	/e/
◌ꪷ	ꪹ◌ꪷ	/ə/
◌ꪺ	ꪶ◌	/o/
◌ꪮ	◌ꪷ	/ɔ/ (in an open syllable)
ꪶ◌ꪉ	◌ꪴꪉ	/uŋ/
ꪶ◌ꪣ	◌ꪴꪣ	/um/
◌ꪝꪾ	◌ꪾ	/am/

=== Tones ===
Traditionally the script used no tone marks and only partially indicated tones with the high/low consonant differentiation. The reader had to guess the tone and thus meaning of a word from context. In the 1970s two tone marks were developed, called mai nueng and mai song. Tone 1 is marked with only a low consonant. Tone 4 is marked with only a high consonant. Tone 2 is marked with the first tone mark and a low consonant form. Tone 5 is marked with the first tone mark and a high consonant form. Tone 3 is marked with the second tone mark and a low consonant form. Tone 6 is marked with the second tone mark and a high consonant form.

Character	Name	Low tone	Low tone pitch	High tone	High tone pitch
◌	–	1	˨	4	˥
◌꪿	mai ek	2		5	
◌꫁	mai tho	3		6	˧˩
◌ꫀ	mai nueng	2		5	
◌ꫂ	mai song	3		6	

== Unicode ==
Proposals to encode Tai Viet script in Unicode go back to 2006. A Unicode subcommittee reviewed a February 6, 2007 proposal submitted by James Brase of SIL International for what was then called Tay Viet script. At the ISO/IEC JTC1/SC2/WG2 meeting on April 24, 2007, a revised proposal for the script, now known as Tai Viet, was accepted "as is", with support from TCVN, the Vietnam Quality & Standards Centre.

Tai Viet was added to the Unicode Standard in October, 2009 with the release of version 5.2.

The Unicode block for Tai Viet is U+AA80–U+AADF:

Tai Viet^{[1]}^{[2]} Official Unicode Consortium code chart (PDF)
	0	1	2	3	4	5	6	7	8	9	A	B	C	D	E	F
U+AA8x	ꪀ	ꪁ	ꪂ	ꪃ	ꪄ	ꪅ	ꪆ	ꪇ	ꪈ	ꪉ	ꪊ	ꪋ	ꪌ	ꪍ	ꪎ	ꪏ
U+AA9x	ꪐ	ꪑ	ꪒ	ꪓ	ꪔ	ꪕ	ꪖ	ꪗ	ꪘ	ꪙ	ꪚ	ꪛ	ꪜ	ꪝ	ꪞ	ꪟ
U+AAAx	ꪠ	ꪡ	ꪢ	ꪣ	ꪤ	ꪥ	ꪦ	ꪧ	ꪨ	ꪩ	ꪪ	ꪫ	ꪬ	ꪭ	ꪮ	ꪯ
U+AABx	ꪰ	ꪱ	ꪲ	ꪳ	ꪴ	ꪵ	ꪶ	ꪷ	ꪸ	ꪹ	ꪺ	ꪻ	ꪼ	ꪽ	ꪾ	꪿
U+AACx	ꫀ	꫁	ꫂ													
U+AADx												ꫛ	ꫜ	ꫝ	꫞	꫟
Notes 1.As of Unicode version 18.0 2.Grey areas indicate non-assigned code points
