= Thai Song language =

Tai language of Thailand

Thai Song
- Lao Song
- Native to: Thailand
- Ethnicity: Lao Song
- Native speakers: (45,000 cited 2001)
- Language family: Kra–Dai: Tai; Southwestern (Thai); Chiang Saen; Tai Dam; Thai Song
- Writing system: Thai script, Tai Viet

Language codes
- ISO 639-3: soa
- Glottolog: thai1259
- ELP: Thai Song
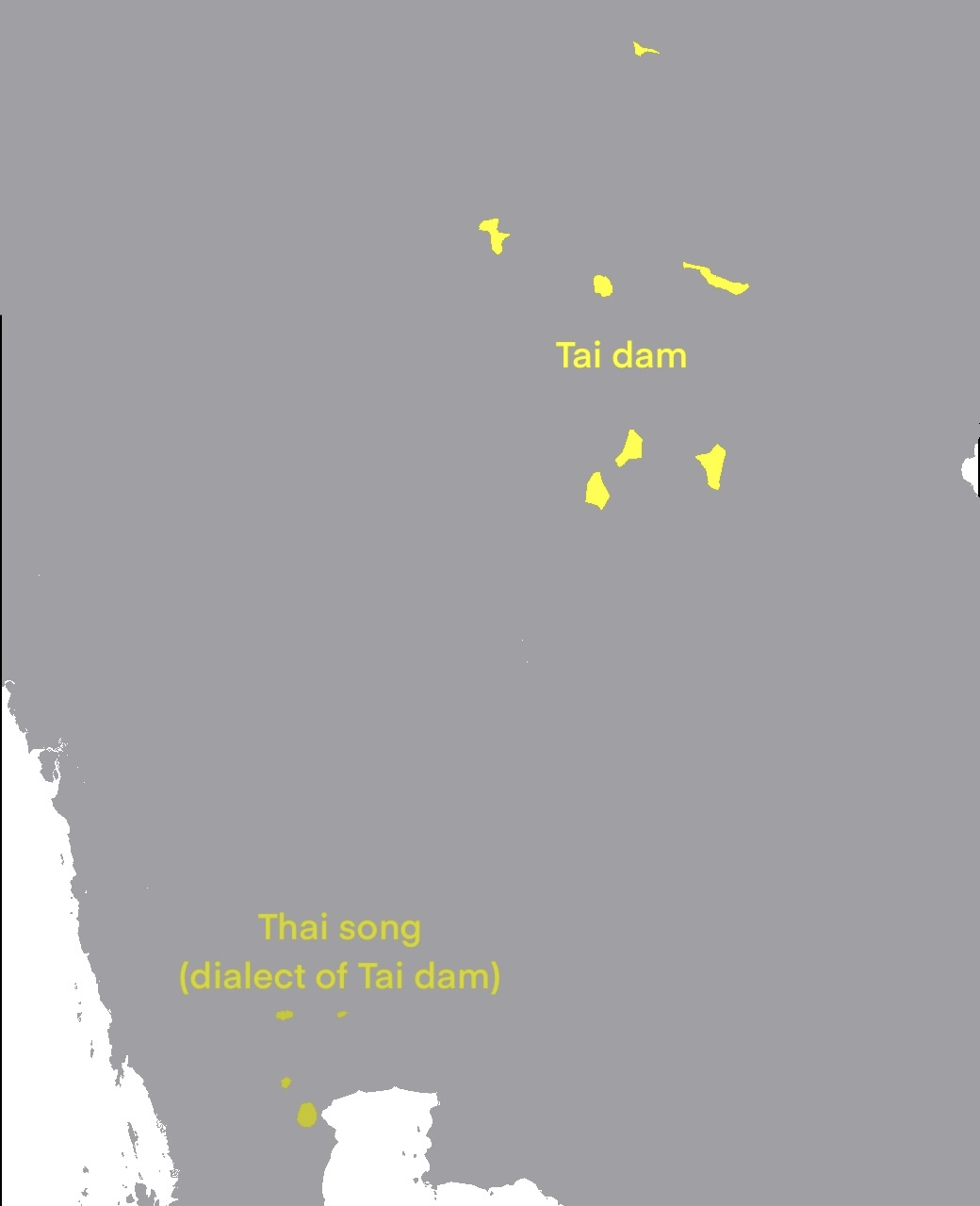
- Map of Tai dam language, showing Thai song as a dialect of Tai dam

Thai Song, or Lao Song, is a Tai language of Thailand. The Tai Song originally settled in Phetchaburi Province, and from there went to settle in various provinces such as Kanchanaburi, Ratchaburi, Suphanburi, Nakhon Pathom, Samut Sakhon, Samut Songkhram, Nakhon Sawan, and Phitsanulok.

== Phonology ==
=== Consonants ===
		Labial	Alveolar	Palatal	Velar	Glottal
Plosive	tenuis	p	t	tɕ	k	ʔ
Plosive	aspirated	p^{h}	t^{h}		k^{h}	
Plosive	voiced	b				
Fricative		f	s			h
Nasal		m	n	ɲ	ŋ	
Approximant		w	l	j		
