= Tai Dón language =

Tai language spoken in China and Southeast Asia

Tai Dón / Tai Khao
- ꪼꪕ ꪒ꪿ꪮꪙ
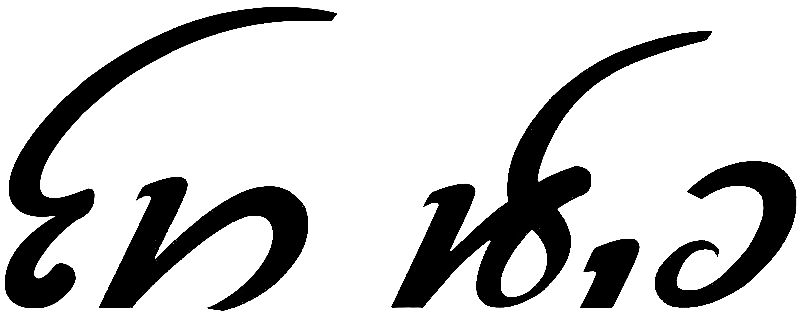
- Pronunciation: /taj˦.dɔn˦˥/, /taj˦.xaːw˨/
- Native to: Laos, Vietnam, China (Mengla Township of Jinping)
- Ethnicity: White Tai
- Native speakers: (500,000 cited 1995–2002)
- Language family: Kra–Dai: Tai; Southwestern (Thai); Chiang Saen; Tai Dón / Tai Khao
- Writing system: Tai Viet

Language codes
- ISO 639-3: twh
- Glottolog: taid1250
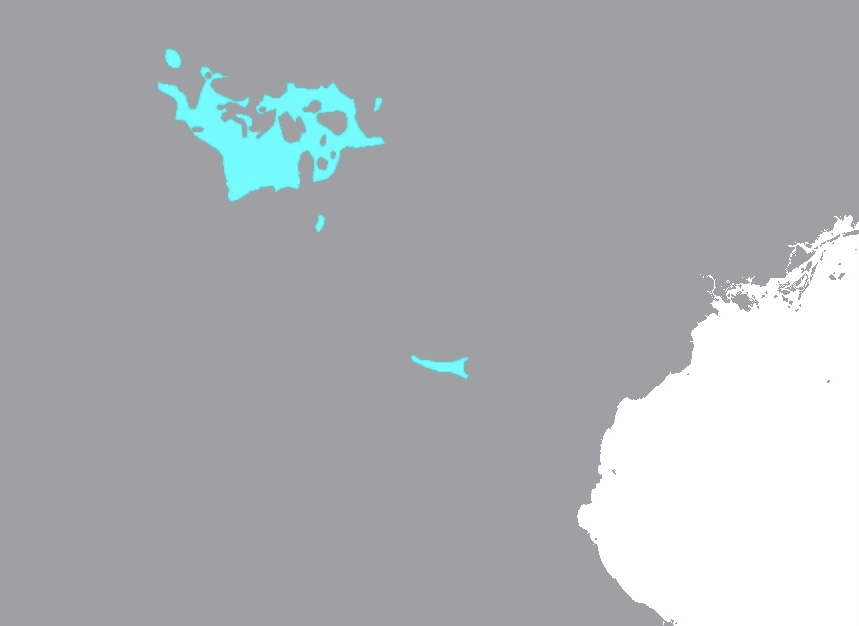

Tai Dón (ꪼꪕ ꪒ꪿ꪮꪙ, /taj˦.dɔn˦˥/), also known as Tai Khao (/taj˦.xaːw˨/) or White Tai, is a Tai language of northern Vietnam, Laos, and China.

== Classification ==
Tai Dón is classified as belonging to the Tai-Kadai language group, located in the Tai languages and Southwestern Tai languages subgroups.

== Geographical distribution ==
In China, White Tai (Tai Khaw 傣皓) people are located in the following townships of Yunnan province, with about 40,000 people (Gao 1999).

- Jinping County 金平县: Mengla Township 勐拉乡 and Zhemi Township 者米乡 (along the banks of the Zhemi River 者米河 and Tengtiao River 藤条)
- Malipo County 麻栗坡县: Nanwenhe Township 南温河乡
- Maguan County 马关县: Dulong Town 都龙镇
- Jiangcheng County 江城县: Qushui Township 曲水乡 (along the banks of the Tuka River 土卡河)

== Phonology ==
Each syllable has at least one onset, one nucleus, and one tone. The following sections present the consonants, vowels, and tones in Tai Dón.

=== Consonants ===
==== Initial consonants ====
Initial consonants in Tai Dón
		Labial	Alveolar	Palatal	Velar	Glottal
Stop/Affricate	voiced	[b]	[d]			
Stop/Affricate	voiceless unaspirated	[p]	[t]	[t͡ɕ] (Note: "Hudak (2008) likely used <c> to transcribe /t͡ɕ/. Fippinger and Fippinger (1970) used <c> to transcribe /t͡ɕ/, by writing "/c/ [č] alveopalatal affricate", for /t͡ɕ/ in Tai Dam, a language closely related to Tai Dón, in an article that compares Tai Dam phonemes to Tai Dón phonemes.)	[k]	[ʔ]
Stop/Affricate	voiceless aspirated	[pʰ]	[tʰ]	[t͡ɕʰ]	[kʰ]	
Nasal		[m]	[n]	[ɲ]	[ŋ]	
Fricative	voiced	[v] (Note: /v/ is likely a sonorant because of its sonority and low level of friction. It is also in complementary distribution with [w] which occurs only at the end of a syllable.)				
Fricative	voiceless	[f]	[s]		[x]	[h]
Approximant			[l]	[j] (Note: /j/ is often pronounced as [z] in initial position due to the influence of Vietnamese phonology.)		

The following table presents the above consonant phonemes in words reported in Hudak's (2008) book.

Phoneme	Example	Phoneme	Example	Phoneme	Example	Phoneme	Example	Phoneme	Example
/b/	/bɤn˨˨/ ꪚꪷꪙ "moon"	/d/	/dɔn˦˥/ ꪒꪮꪙꫀ "white"						
/p/	/pɔ˦˥˦/ ꪝ꪿ꪮ "father"	/t/	/tu˨˨/ ꪔꪴ "door"	/t͡ɕ/	/t͡ɕɔn˧˩ʔ/ ꪋꪮꪙꫂ "spoon"	/k/	/kaːŋ˨˨/ ꪀꪱꪉ "middle"	/ʔ/	/ʔaːŋ˦˥/ ꪮꪱꪉꫀ "basin"
/pʰ/	/pʰaː˨˦ʔ/ ꪞꪱꫂ "cloth"	/tʰ/	/tʰiw˨˨/ ꪖꪲꪫ "to whistle"	/t͡ɕʰ/	/t͡ɕʰaj˦˥/ ꪼꪌꫀ "egg"	/kʰ/	/kʰo˨˦ʔ/ ꪂꪺꫂ "to cook"		
/m/	/mɯŋ˦˦/ ꪣꪳꪉ "you"	/n/	/naː˨˦ʔ/ ꪘꪱꫂ "face"	/ɲ/	/ɲuŋ˦˦/ ꪶꪑꪉ "mosquito"	/ŋ/	/ŋaːj˦˥˦/ ꪉꪱꪥꫀ "easy"		
/v/	/vaːn˨˨/ ꪪꪱꪙ "sweet"								
/f/	/faː˨˨/ ꪠꪱ "lid"	/s/	/sɔŋ˨˨/ ꪎꪮꪉ "two"			/x/	/xaj˨˨/ ꪼꪄ "tallow"	/h/	/hɤ˦˥/ ꪬꪷꫀ "sweat"
		/l/	/loŋ˦˦/ ꪩꪺꪉ "dragon"	/j/	/jɔj˧˩ʔ/ ꪥꪮꪥꫂ "to drool"				

There are four labialized velar consonant clusters that occur at the beginning of a syllable.

Velar + w consonant clusters in Tai Dón
Cluster	Example
kw	/kwaː˦˥˦/ ꪁꪫꪱꫀ "to visit"
kʰw	/kʰwe˦˥/ ꪂꪫꪸꫀ "to dig"
ŋw	/ŋwaː˦˥˦/ ꪉꪫꪱꫀ "fig"
xw	/xwan˦˦/ ꪅꪫꪽ "smoke"

==== Final consonants ====
Final consonants in Tai Dón
	Labial	Alveolar	Palatal	Velar	Glottal
Stop	p	t		k	ʔ
Nasal	m	n		ŋ	
Approximant	w		j	ɰ (Note: "/ɰ/ occurs after /a/ (e.g., /baɰ˨˨/ ꪻꪚ "leaf"))	

=== Vowels ===
Tai Dón has nine short vowels, and one long vowel. However, the short vowels are phonetically realized as long in final position (e.g., /e/ is phonetically [eː] in final position).

Vowels in Tai Dón
	Front			Back	
	unrounded				rounded
High	i			ɯ	u
Mid	e			ɤ	o
Low	ɛ	a	aː		ɔ

=== Tones ===
There are six tones on a smooth syllable (an open syllable or a closed syllable ending in a sonorant).

Tai Dón tones in smooth syllables
Description	Tone letters	Example
level, slightly lower than mid	22 (or ˨˨)	/kaː˨˨/ ꪀꪱ "crow"
high-rising	45 (or ˦˥)	/kaː˦˥/ ꪀꪱꫀ "all the way to"
low-rising, glottalized	24ʔ (or ˨˦ʔ)	/kaː˨˦ʔ/ ꪀꪱꫂ "young rice plant"
level, somewhat higher than mid	44 (or ˦˦)	/kaː˦˦/ ꪁꪱ "stuck"
level, somewhat higher than mid with a rise and fall	454 (or ˦˥˦)	/kaː˦˥˦/ ꪁꪱꫀ "price"
falling, glottalized	31ʔ (or ˧˩ʔ)	/kaː˧˩ʔ/ ꪁꪱꫂ "to trade"

Two of the six tones occur on a checked syllable (a syllable ending in a stop).

Tai Dón tones in checked syllables
Tone	Vowel length	Example
high-rising	short	/sat˦˥/ ꪎꪰꪒ "animal"
high-rising	long	/ʔaːp˦˥/ ꪮꪱꪚ "to bathe"
level, somewhat higher than mid	short	/mot˦˦/ ꪣꪺꪒ "ant"
level, somewhat higher than mid	long	/laːt˦˦/ ꪩꪱꪒ "to cover"

== Writing system ==
=== Consonants ===
The letter order of Tai Don consonants, including regular and alternative glyph forms, found in manuscripts from Mường So, Phong Thổ, and Mường Lai, Việt Nam.

==== Initials ====
Shown below are consonants of Tai Don with two tonal registers (high on the top and low on the bottom).

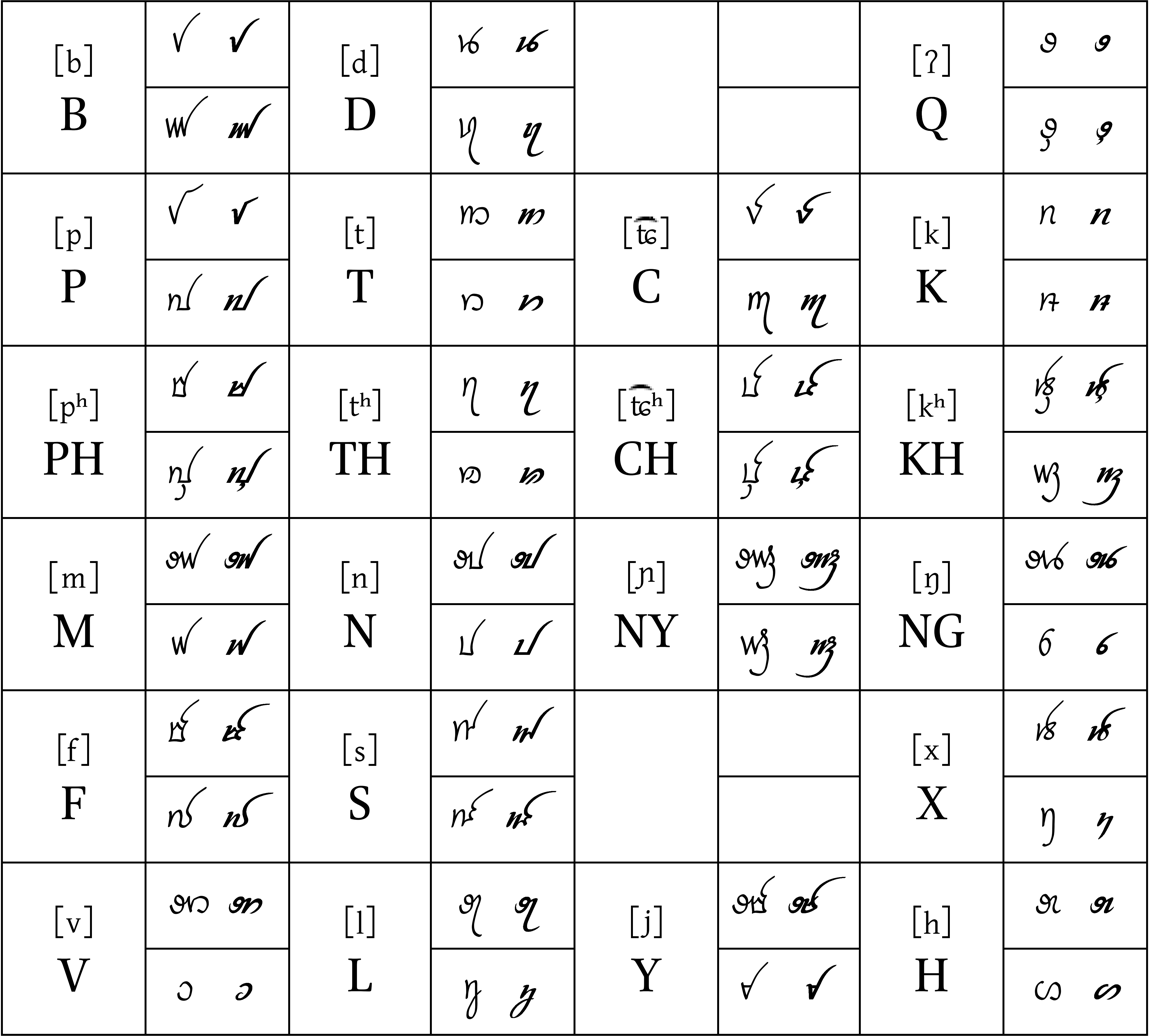

==== Finals ====
The letter order of Tai Don vowels, including regular and alternative glyph forms, found in manuscripts from Mường So, Phong Thổ, and Mường Lai, Việt Nam.

Shown below are final consonants of Tai Don with short vowel [a] on top and other vowels on the bottom.

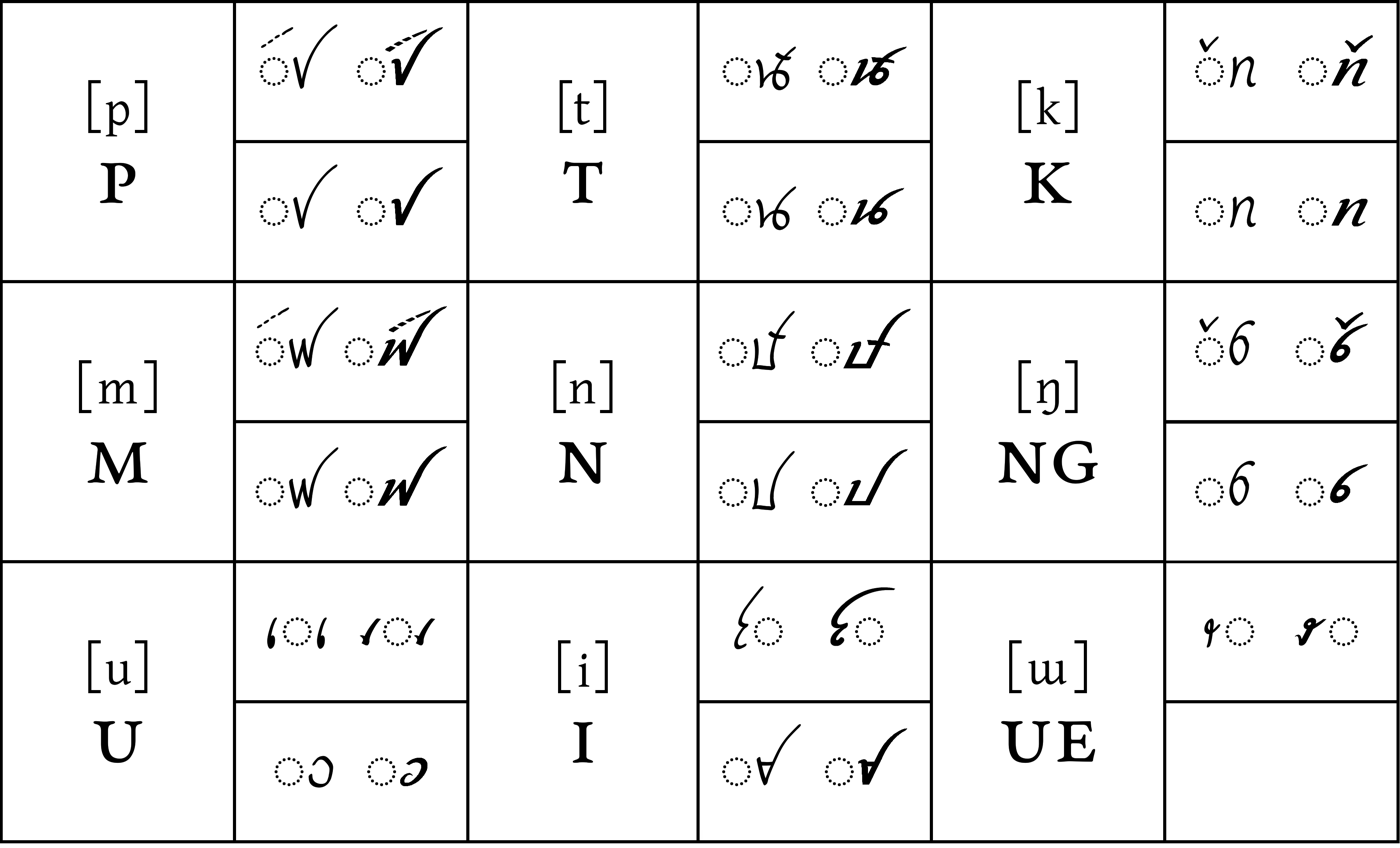

=== Onset ===
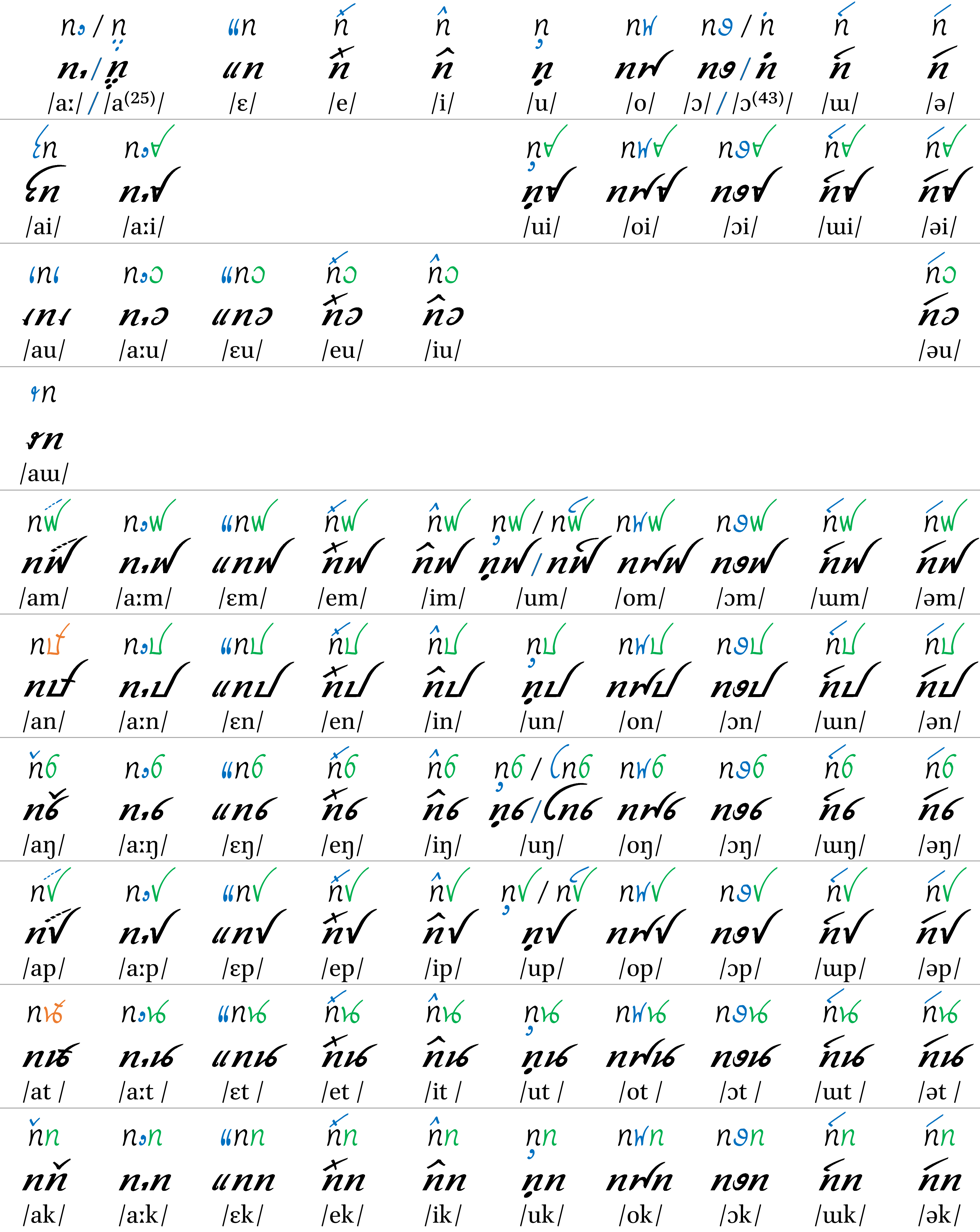
