= Tai Dam language =

Tai language spoken in Southeast Asia

Tai Dam
- Black Tai
- ꪼꪕꪒꪾ; ไทดำ
- Native to: Vietnam, Laos, Thailand, China
- Ethnicity: Tai Dam
- Native speakers: (760,000 cited 1995–2002)
- Language family: Kra–Dai: Tai; Southwestern (Thai); Chiang Saen; Tai Dam
- Writing system: Tai Viet

Official status
- Recognised minority language in: Vietnam; Thailand

Language codes
- ISO 639-3: blt
- Glottolog: taid1247
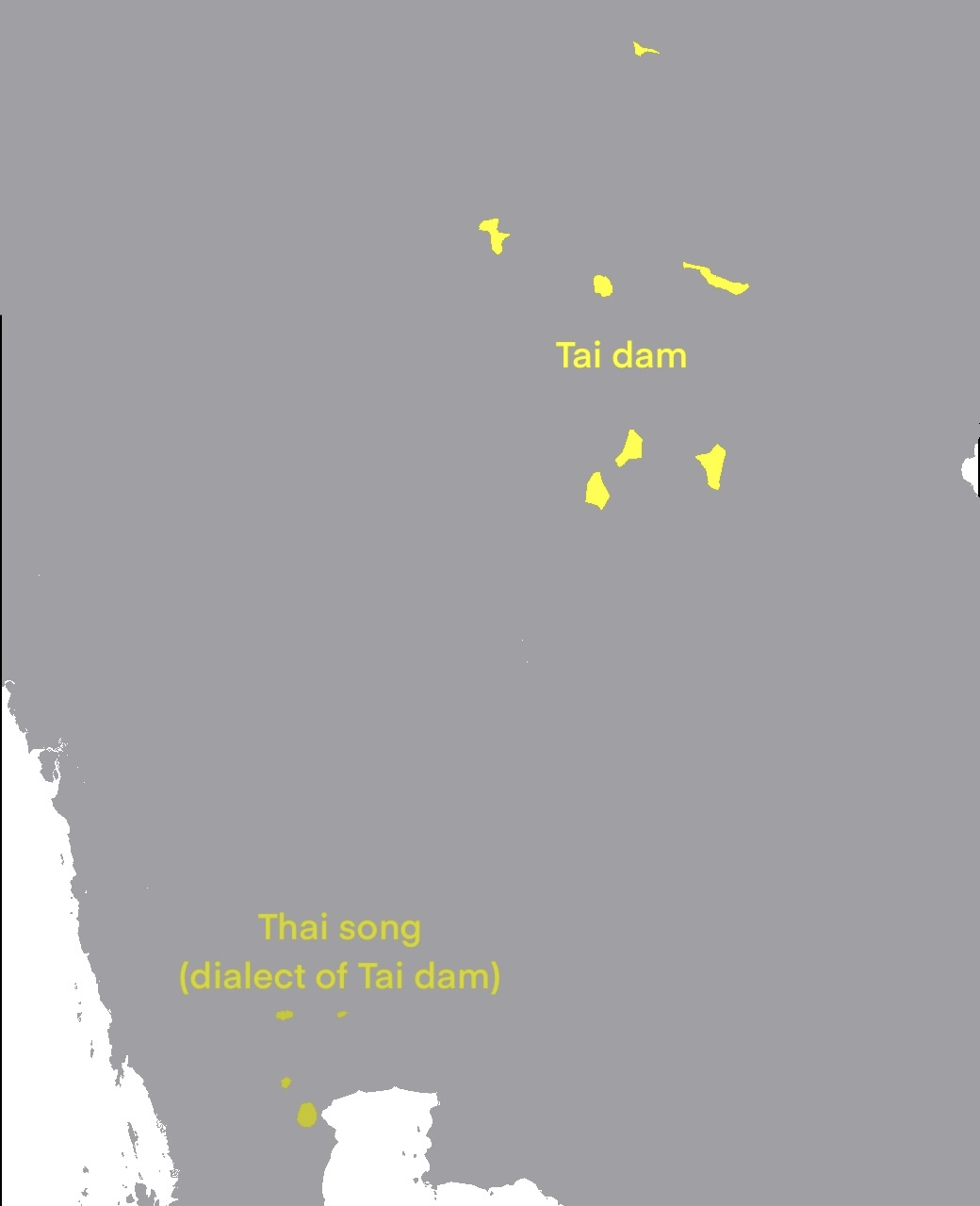

Tai Dam (simplified Chinese: 傣担语; traditional Chinese: 傣擔語; pinyin: Dǎidānyǔ), also known as Black Tai (Thai: ภาษาไทดำ; pronounced [pʰāː sǎː tʰāj dām]; Vietnamese: tiếng Thái Đen; 'Black Tai language'; simplified Chinese: 黑傣语; traditional Chinese: 黑傣語; pinyin: Hēidǎiyǔ), is a Tai language spoken by the Tai Dam in Vietnam, Laos, Thailand, and China (mostly in Jinping Miao, Yao, and Dai Autonomous County).

The Tai Dam language is similar to Thai and Lao (including Isan), but it is not close enough to be readily understood by most Thai and Lao (Isan) speakers. In particular, the Khmer, Pali and Sanskrit additions to Thai and Lao (Isan) are largely missing from Tai Dam.

== Geographical distribution ==
Tai Dam is spoken in Vietnam, China, Laos, and Thailand. In central and western Thailand, it is known as Thai Song.

Tai Dam speakers in China are classified as part of the Dai nationality along with almost all the other Tai peoples. But in Vietnam they are given their own nationality (with the White Tai) where they are classified (confusingly for English speakers) as the Thái nationality (meaning Tai people).

In China, Tai Dam (Chinese: 傣朗姆) people are located in the following townships of Yunnan, with about 20,000 people in Yunnan (Gao 1999).

- Maguan County 马关县: Muchang Township 木厂乡, Dalishu Township 大栗树乡, and Pojiao Township 坡脚乡
- Wenshan County 文山县: Dehou Township 德厚乡, Panzhihua Township 攀枝花乡
- Hekou County 河口县: Qiaotou Town 桥头镇 (in Baihei Village 白黑村 and Gantianzhai 甘田寨)
- Yuanjiang County 元江县: Dashuiping Township 大水平乡 (in Gaozhai 高寨 and Yangmahe 养马河)

=== Official status ===
In Vietnam, all Tai peoples are taught a standardized Tai language based on the Tai Dam language, using the standardized Tai Viet script.

== Phonology ==
=== Consonants ===
==== Initials ====
		Labial	Dental/ Alveolar	(Alveolo-) Palatal	Velar		Glottal
		Labial	Dental/ Alveolar	(Alveolo-) Palatal	plain	lab.	Glottal
Plosive	tenuis	[p] ꪜ,ꪝ	[t] ꪔ,ꪕ		[k] ꪀ,ꪁ	[kʷ] ꪀꪫ,ꪁꪫ	[ʔ] ꪮ,ꪯ
Plosive	aspirated		[tʰ] ꪖ,ꪗ				
Plosive	voiced	[b] ꪚ,ꪛ	[d] ꪒ,ꪓ				
Affricate				[t͡ɕ] ꪊ,ꪋ			
Nasal		[m] ꪢ,ꪣ	[n] ꪘ,ꪙ	[ɲ] ꪐ,ꪑ	[ŋ] ꪈ,ꪉ	[ŋʷ] ꪈꪫ,ꪉꪫ	
Fricative	voiceless	[f] ꪠ,ꪡ	[s] ꪎ,ꪏ		[x] ꪄ,ꪅ	[xʷ] ꪄꪫ,ꪅꪫ	[h] ꪬ,ꪭ
Fricative	voiced	[v] ꪪ,ꪫ					
Approximant			[l] ꪨ,ꪩ	[j] ꪤ,ꪥ			

- Sounds /b/ and /d/ can fluctuate to voiced implosive sounds [ɓ], [ɗ]. /d/ may also fluctuate to a lateral sound [l]. /v/ can fluctuate to sounds [b~ɓ].
- In some rare cases /j/ can be realized as a [z] sound.

==== Finals ====
	Labial	Alveolar	Palatal	Velar	Glottal
Plosive	[p]	[t]		[k]	[ʔ]
Nasal	[m]	[n]		[ŋ]	
Approximant	[w]		[j]		

- Final plosive sounds /p t k/ can be realized as unreleased [p̚ t̚ k̚].

=== Vowels ===
	Front	Central-Back	Back
Close	[i] ◌ꪲ	[ɨ ~ ɯ] ◌ꪳ	[u] ◌ꪴ
Glide	[iə̯] ◌ꪸ	[ɨə̯ ~ ɯə̯] ꪹ◌	[uə̯] ◌ꪺ
Mid	[e] ꪹ◌ꪸ	[ə ~ ɤ] ꪹ◌ꪷ	[o] ꪶ◌
Open	[ɛ] ꪵ◌	[a aː] ◌ꪰ ◌ꪱ	[ɔ] ◌ꪮ,◌ꪷ

- There is also /əw/ that corresponds to Proto-Tai *aɰ.
- /ɛ/ can tend to fluctuate to a more open sound [æ].
- /ɨ/ fluctuates to a back unrounded sound [ɯ].

== Writing system ==
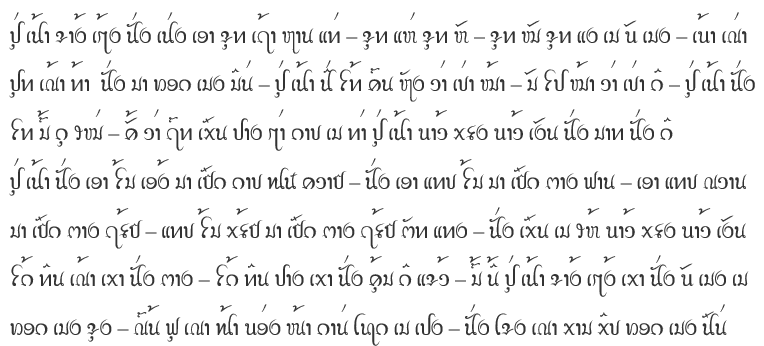
A text in Tai Viet script

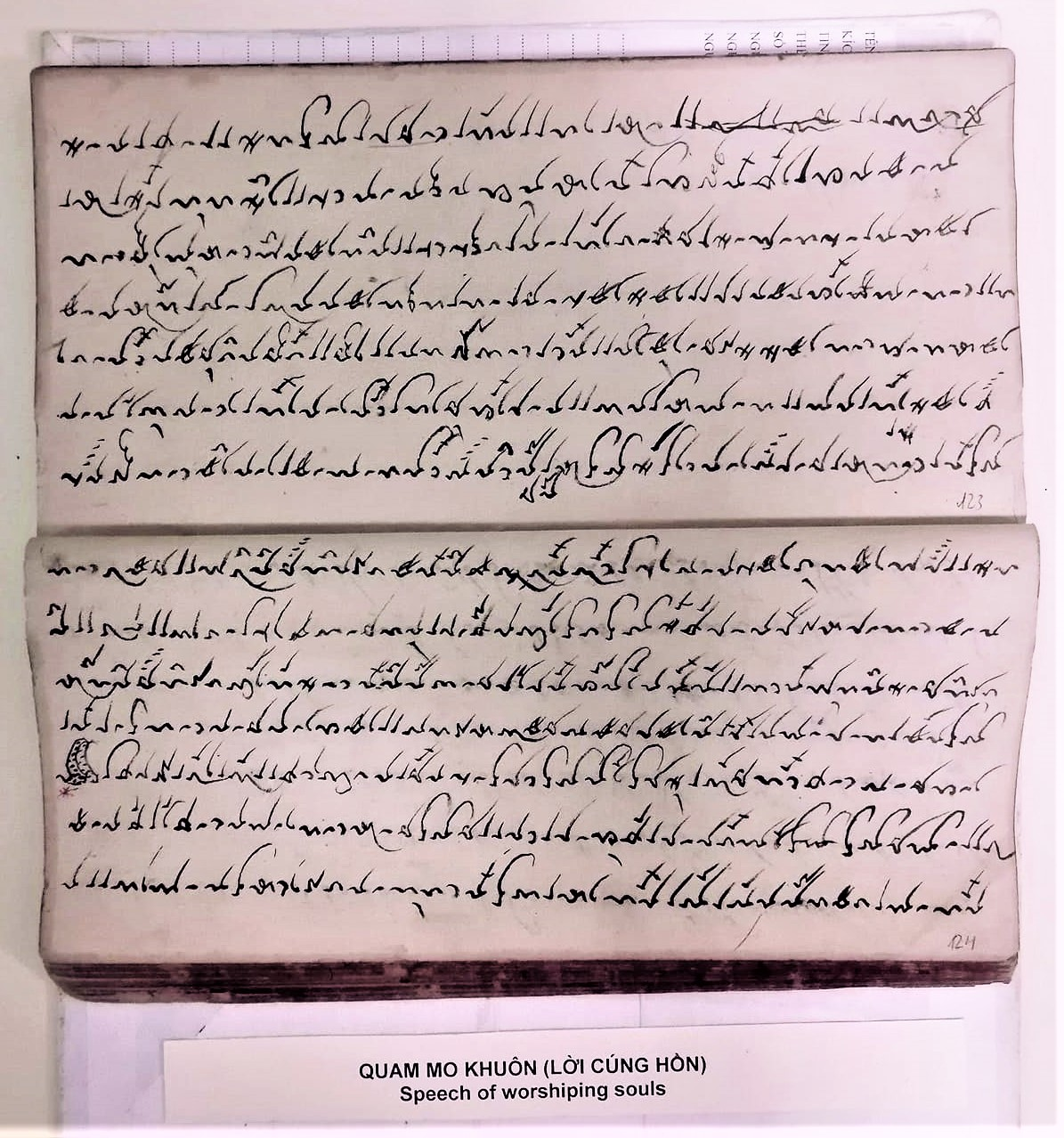
Tai Dam Manuscript

The Tai Dam language has its own system of writing, called Tai Viet, which consists of 31 consonants and 14 vowels. At the beginning, there was no tone marker although the language is tonal. Tone markers emerge in the 1970s in two sets: combining marks like Thai/Lao, and modifiers like New Tai Lue/Tai Nuea which are now less popular. According to Thai authors, the writing system is probably derived from the old Thai writing of the kingdom of Sukhotai.

== Grammar ==
=== Pronouns ===
Pronoun	Formal	Informal
I	ꪄ꫁ꪮꪤ (xɔy3)	ꪀꪴ (ku1)
We	ꪏꪴꪙ ꪄ꫁ꪮꪤ (sun4 xɔy3)	ꪏꪴꪣ ꪠꪴ (sum4 fu1)
You	ꪹꪊ꫁ꪱ (caw3)	ꪣꪳꪉ (mueng4)
You (plural)	ꪏꪴꪙ ꪹꪊ꫁ꪱ (sun4 caw3)	ꪎꪴ (su1)
He/ she	ꪹꪝ꪿ꪙ (puean5)	ꪣꪽ (man4)
They	ꪏꪴꪙ ꪹꪝ꪿ꪙ (sun4 puean5)	ꪹꪎꪱ (saw1)

For the word "I"

- When addressing parents the word ꪩꪴ꪿ꪀ (luk5) is used instead.
- When addressing grandparents the word ꪨꪰꪣ (lam1) is used instead.

Pronoun	Formal	Informal
My	ꪄꪮꪉ ꪄ꫁ꪮꪤ (xɔng1 xɔy3)	ꪄꪮꪉ ꪀꪴ (xɔng1 ku1)
Our	ꪄꪮꪉ ꪏꪴꪙ ꪄ꫁ꪮꪤ (xɔng1 sun4 xɔy3)	ꪄꪮꪉ ꪏꪴꪣ ꪠꪴ (xɔng1 sum4 fu1)
Your	ꪄꪮꪉ ꪹꪊ꫁ꪱ (xɔng1 caw3)	ꪄꪮꪉ ꪣꪳꪉ (xɔng1 mueng4)
Your (plural)	ꪄꪮꪉ ꪏꪴꪙ ꪹꪊ꫁ꪱ (xɔng1 sun4 caw3)	ꪄꪮꪉ ꪎꪴ (xɔng1 su1)
His/ her	ꪄꪮꪉ ꪹꪝ꪿ꪙ (xɔng1 puean5)	ꪄꪮꪉ ꪣꪽ (xɔng1 man4)
Their	ꪄꪮꪉ ꪏꪴꪙ ꪹꪝ꪿ꪙ (xɔng1 sun4 puean5)	ꪄꪮꪉ ꪹꪎꪱ (xɔng1 saw1)

For the word "my"

- When addressing parents the word ꪄꪮꪉ ꪩꪴ꪿ꪀ (xɔng1 luk5) is used instead.
- When addressing grandparents the word ꪄꪮꪉ ꪨꪰꪣ (xɔng1 lam1) is used instead.

=== Syntax ===
Tai Dam uses an SVO word order.

== Vocabulary ==
The Khmer, Pali and Sanskrit additions to Thai and Lao (Isan) are generally absent from Tai Dam. Tai Dam lacks many of the Khmer and Indic (via Khmer) loanwords found in Thai, Lao and Isan.

Lack of Khmer and Indic (via Khmer) loan words in Tai Dam
Khmer loan word				Isan		Lao		Thai		Tai Dam		Gloss
ទន្លេ tônlé^{1}			/tɔːn leː/	ทะเล thale	/tʰàʔ.le᷇ː/	ທະເລ thalé	/tʰāʔ.léː/	ทะเล thale	/tʰáʔ.lēː/	ꪘꪮꪉꪨꪺꪉ noang luang	/nɔŋ˨.luə̯ŋ˨/	'sea'
រៀន reăn			/riən/	เฮียน hian	/hi᷇an/	ຮຽນ hian	/hían/	เรียน rian	/rīan/	ꪵꪮꪚ ʼaep	/ʔɛp̚˦˥/	'to learn'
भाषा bhāṣā^{2}	/bʱaːʂaː/	ភាសា pheăsa	/pʰiə saː/	ภาษา phasa	/pʰa᷇ː.săː/	ພາສາ phasa	/pʰáː.săː/	ภาษา phasa	/pʰāː.săː/	ꪁꪫꪱꪣ kwaam	/kʷaːm˥/	'language'
राज rāja^{2}	/raːdʒaː/	រាជា reăcheă	/riə ɕiə/	ราชา racha	/la᷇ː.sa᷇ː/	ຣາຊາ raxa	/láː.sáː/	ราชา racha	/rāː.tɕʰāː/	ꪜꪺ pua	/puə̯˨/	'king'
वेला velā^{2}	/ʋe laː/	វេលា véreǎ	/veː liːə/	เวลา wela	/we᷇ː.la᷇ː/	ເວລາ véla	/wéː.láː/	เวลา wela	/wēː.lāː/	ꪑꪱꪣ nyaam	/ɲaːm˥/	'time'
សប្បាយ sǎpbay			/sap baːj/	สบาย sabai	/sáʔ.bāːj/	ສບາຽ/ສະບາຍ sabay	/sáʔ.bàːj/	สบาย sabai	/sàʔ.bāːj/	ꪅ꫁ꪽꪒꪷ xan doa	/xan˧˩.dɔː˨/	'to be well'
រាក់ raek^{3}			/raːk/	ฮัก hak	/hàk/	ຮັກ hak	/hāk/	รัก rak	/rák/	ꪭꪰꪀ hak	/hak˥/	'love'

- ^1 Khmer tônlé generally signifies 'lake' or 'large canal'. Similarly, the Tai Dam term for the sea means 'large lake'.
- ^2 Sanskrit source of following Khmer word. Thai and Lao adopted Sanskrit terms via Khmer, but restored their vowels pronunciations.
- ^3 The term rak was borrowed from Proto-Mon-Khmer *r[a]k meaning 'to love, beloved, dear' although now the term raek means 'friendly, cordial, pleasant; intimate, affectionate' in modern Khmer.
