= Tai Dón people =

White Tai
- Flag of Tai Don people in Muang Lay, used since 1944 to 1953

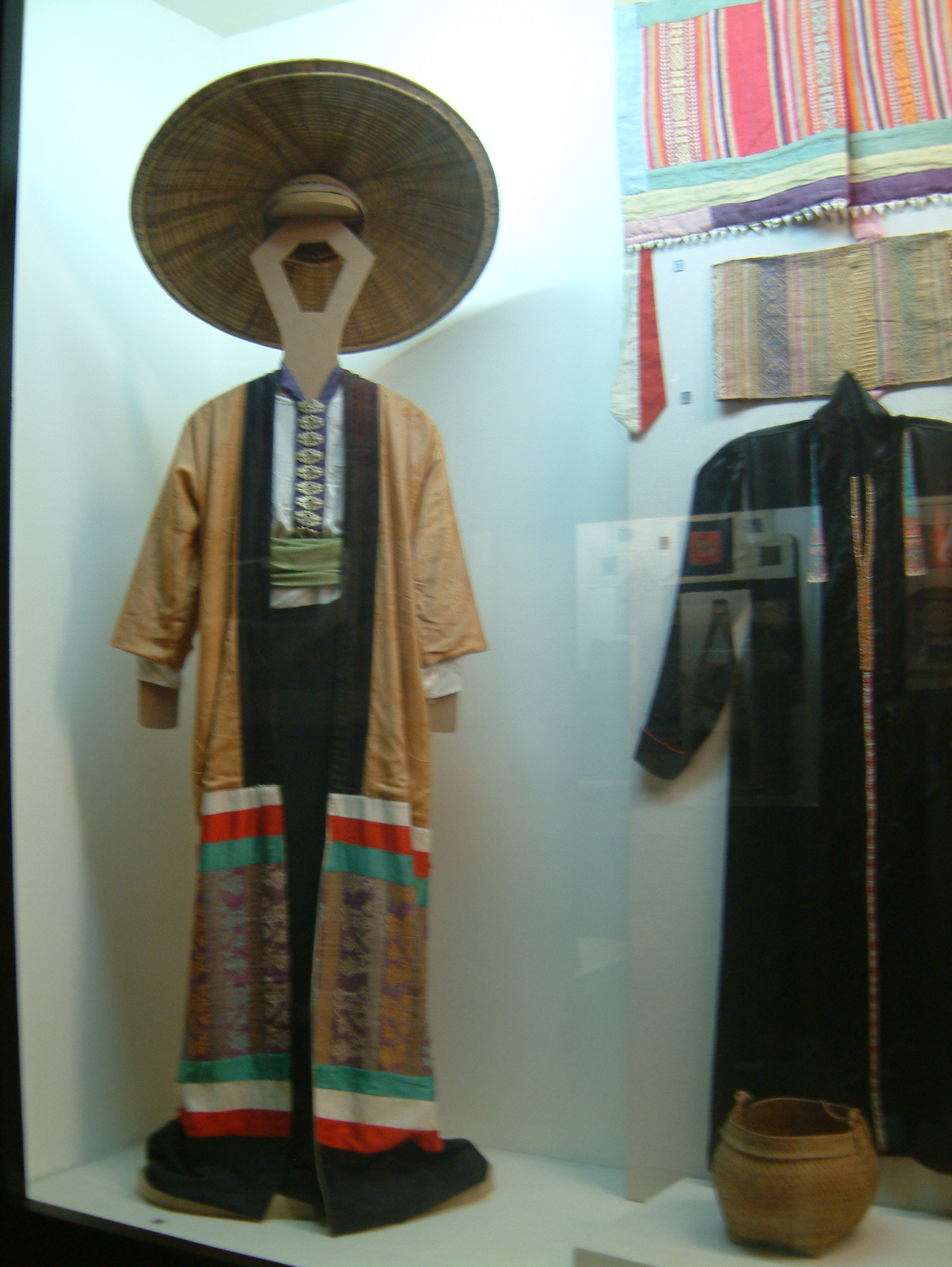
- Traditional costume of the White Tai

Total population
- 490,000

Regions with significant populations
- Vietnam, Laos

Languages
- Tai Dón, Lao, others

Religion
- Tai folk religion, Theravada Buddhism, Christianity

White Tai (in Tai Dón, ꪼꪕꪒꪮꪙꫀ, /taj˦˦.dɔn˦˥/; in Thai language and Lao language Tai Khao; in Vietnamese language Tai Dón or Thái Trắng, in Chinese language Dai Duan) is an ethnic group of Laos, Vietnam and China. In Vietnam they are called Tai Dón or Thái Trắng and are included in the group of the Tái peoples, together with the Thái Đen ("Black Tai"), Thái Đỏ ("Red Tai"), Phu Thai, Tày Thanh and Thái Hàng Tổng. The group of the Tái people is the third largest of the fifty-four ethnic groups recognized by the Vietnamese government. They immigrated to Vietnam and Laos from Yunnan (China)

== Geographic distribution ==
There are approximately 280,000 White Tai in Vietnam (2002), 200,000 in Laos (1995) and 10,000 in Yunan province, China (1995).

== History ==
The White Tai migrated from China to Laos several centuries ago, settling along the Red and Black Rivers.

== Language ==
The White Tai speak a language called Tai Khao, also called Tai Dón. It is a Tai–Kadai language.

== Family ==
Men are the heads of White Tai households, although division of labor is nearly equal.

== Religions ==
- Animism (60%)
- Theravada Buddhism (38%)
- Christianity (2%)

The White Tai believe in multiple personal souls and hold ceremonies to recall those souls to strengthen their character.
