= Tai Dam people =

Ethnic group in Asia

Tai Dam
ꪼꪕ ꪒꪾ

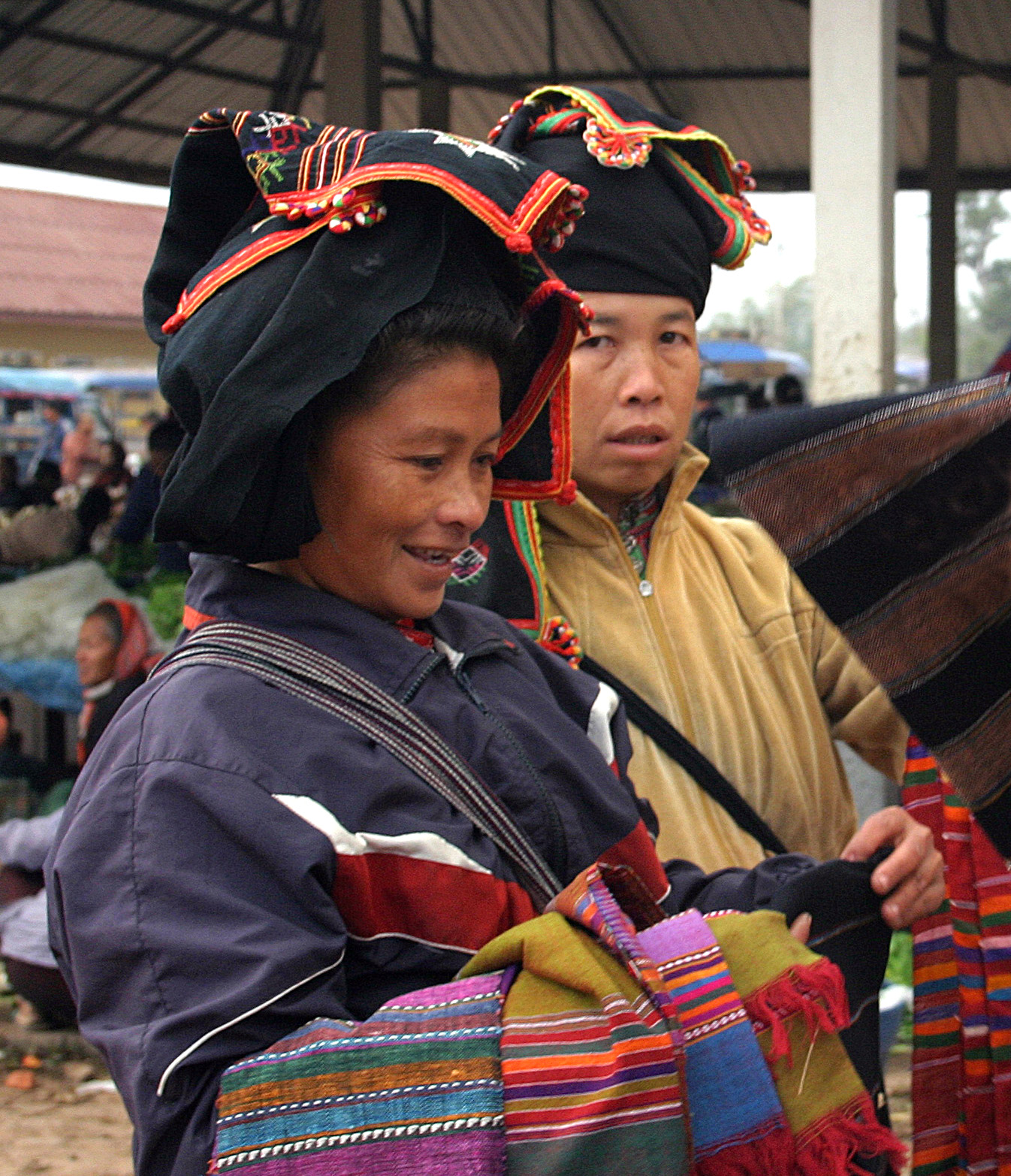

Total population
- 949,500 people

Regions with significant populations
- China, Laos, Thailand, Vietnam, United States

Languages
- Tai Dam, Vietnamese, Lao, Isan, Thai, Chinese

Religion
- Tai folk religion, Animism, Christianity, Theravada Buddhism

The Tai Dam (Tai Dam: ꪼꪕ ꪒꪾ, Lao: ໄຕດຳ, Thai: ไทดำ) are an ethnic minority predominantly from China, northwest Vietnam, Laos, Thailand. They are part of the Tai peoples and ethnically similar to the Thai from Thailand, the Lao from Laos and the Shan from Shan State, Myanmar. Tai Dam means "Black Tai". This name comes from the black clothing worn by the group, especially females. In Vietnam they are called Thái Đen and are included in the group of the Thái people, together with the Thái Đỏ ("Red Tai"), Thái Trắng ("White Tai"), Phu Thai, Tày Thanh and Thái Hàng Tổng. The group of the Thái people is the third largest of the 54 ethnic groups recognized by the Vietnamese government. The Tai Dam's language is similar to Lao, but Tai Dam use their own unique writing system and traditionally rejected Buddhism. According to the Tai Dam's creation story, the Lo Cam family is to be the ruling class and the Luong the priests.

== Classification ==
Under Vietnam's classification of the Tai peoples are the White Tai, Thái Đỏ ("Red Tai"), Tày Mười, Tày Thanh (Man Thanh), Hàng Tổng (Tày Mường), Pu Thay, Thổ Đà Bắc.

== History ==
The Tai originated from southern China where their ancestors have lived since ancient times.

During the Indochina War, most Tai Dam allied with the communists. However, some Tai Dam allied with the French and fought against communism. After the fall of Điện Biên Phủ, this anticommunist faction fled Vietnam for northern Laos. By 1955, most Tai Dam moved to Vientiane, the capital of Laos. They worked as domestics, government officials, and soldiers. As communism descended on South Vietnam and Laos, the Tai Dam feared reprisals for their anticommunist past. They evacuated to Thailand and campaigned for sanctuary. Arthur Crisfield, an American language instructor, wrote letters to foreign governments on the group's behalf. In the summer of 1975, Governor Robert D. Ray agreed to resettle the Tai Dam in the state of Iowa. He needed an exemption from U.S. President Gerald Ford to bring a large ethnic population to one state. Today, more Tai Dam live in Iowa than anywhere outside of Asia, numbering over 10,000.

== Economics ==
Early in their history, the Thai adopted wet rice cultivation, using suitable irrigation networks. The work can be summarized in the Thai saying "muong - phai - lai - lin" (which means digging of canals, consolidating of banks, guiding water through obstacles, and fixing water gutters) in the fields. While the Thai once grew only one sticky rice crop a year, nowadays they have converted to two crops of ordinary rice. They also cultivate swidden fields, where they grow rice, corn, and subsidiary crops, especially cotton, indigo and mulberry for cloth weaving.

== Language ==
The Tai have their own Brahmic writing system. Their language is taught orally. The Tai have many ancient written works on their history, traditions, customary laws, and literature.

== Culture ==
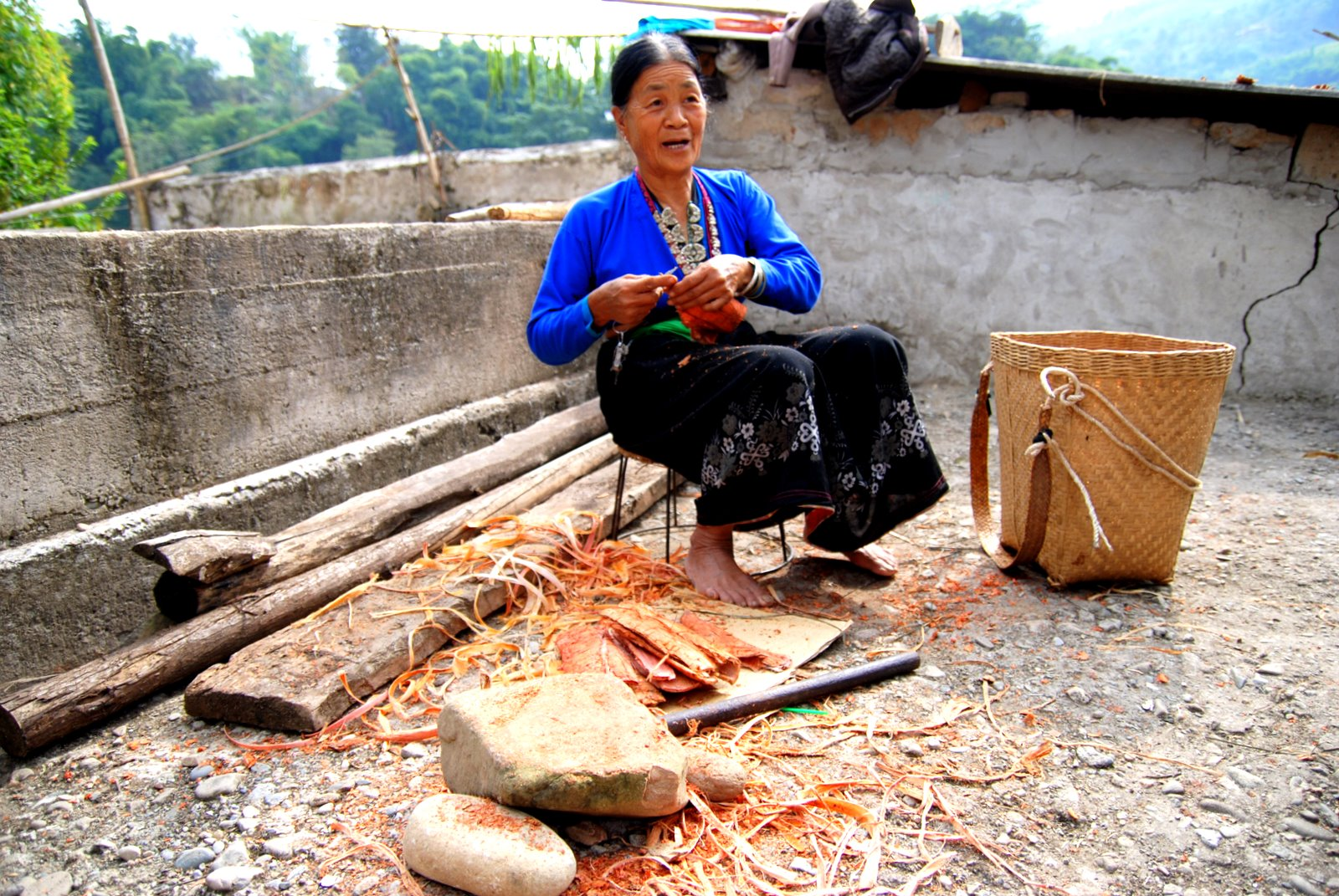
A Tai Dam lady in Laomeng village, Jinping Miao, Yao, and Dai Autonomous County, Yunnan Province, China.

Although their culture is male-dominated, women play an important part in Tai Dam society. Women have the responsibility of maintaining altars to deceased parents. The ethnic group's name originates from the traditional black skirts and headdresses worn by Tai Dam women. The black silk is embroidered with flowers and beautiful patterns. The belt is typically bright green. Tai Dam women still wear the traditional clothing, especially at ceremonies.

The Tai Dam religion consists of spirit worship, and the spirits of ancestors are especially important to them. They wear white at funerals as a symbol of grief. After the funeral but before the cremation, coins are thrown into the crowd. The dead are cremated with gold and silver jewelry. This practice originates from the belief the person's dead spirit may need to produce payment into the spirit realm.

When the family finds a burial place, they sift through the ashes with water and pick out the melted jewelry for keepsakes before burying the ashes. Often food that includes a pig and fruit are set before the headstone as respect for the dead.

Pregnant women are not allowed at funerals for fear of spirits surrounding the situation, which Tai Dam believe can infiltrate the woman's womb and be born through the fetus.

Family members are expected to cry and women are asked to scream loudly. To symbolize their grief, they cannot take a full shower or bath until after the funeral. They also cannot attend or throw parties, such as weddings and graduations, for up to one year.

=== Cuisine ===
Today, ordinary rice has become the main food of the Tai, while sticky rice is still being eaten traditionally. Sticky rice is steeped in water, put in a steaming pot and put on a fire and cooked. A meal cannot go without ground chili mixed with salt and accompanied by mint, coriander leaves and onion. Boiled chicken liver, fish gut, and smoked fish called cheo could well be added to the meal. Ruminate meat should be accompanied by sauce taken from the internal organs (nam pia). Raw fish should be either cooked into salad or meat-in-sauce, or simply salted or sauced. Cooked food processing ranges from roasting, steaming and drying to condensing frying, and boiling. The Tai enjoy food with more hot, salty, acrid and buttery tastes, in contrast to those that have sweet, rich and strong tastes. They smoke with bamboo pipes, lighted by dried bamboo pieces. Before smoking, the Tai maintain their custom of hospitality by inviting others to join in, much as they would do before a meal.

=== Clothing ===
Tai women wear short and colorful blouses, accented down the front with lines of silver buttons in the shapes of butterflies, spiders and cicadas. Their blouses fit beautifully with their tube-shaped black skirts. The belt is a green colored silk band. They wear a key chain round their waists. On festival occasions, Tai women can wear an extra black dress, with an underarm seam or like a pullover which has an open collar, thus revealing the silver buttons inside. The black dresses are nipped at the waist, include large shoulders and decorative pieces of cloth that are attached to the underarms or to the front of the shoulders in a manner similar to the White Tai.

Black Tai women wear the famous pieu shawl with colorful embroidery. Tai men wear shorts with a belt; a shirt with an open collar and two pockets on either side. White Tai men have an additional upper pocket on the left and their collar is fastened with a cloth band. The popular color of all clothes is black, pale red, striped or white-colored. At festivals, people wear long black dresses, with split underarm seams and an internal white blouse. A head turban is worn as a headdress, and in ceremonies, the turban should be the length of an arm.

=== Housing ===
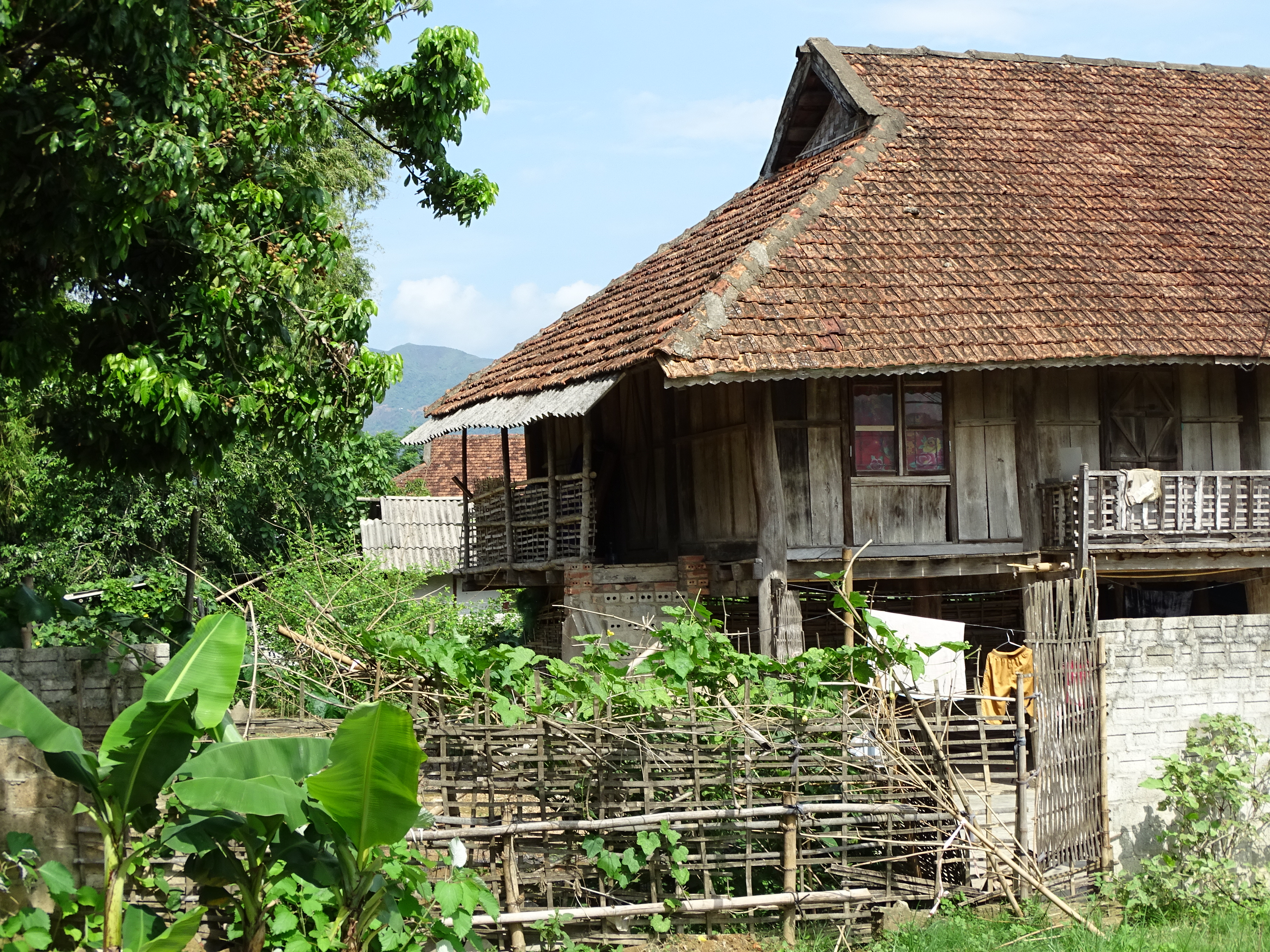
Traditional dwelling of the Tai Dam in the Mường Thanh Valley, northern Vietnam. The Vietnamese name Mường Thanh is from the local Tai form of Mueang Thaen, the 'City of the Gods' and the birthplace of Khun Burom in the Tai legends of Southeast Asia.

The Tai live in stilt houses with roofs of different designs: those houses with a round convex roof like a turtle shell with two ends called khau cut; those with a four paneled roof and a rectangle floor and corridors; those houses with a long and high roof and with rooms at either ends being used as halls; and those with a low roof and narrow interior, which is close to the Muong house style.

=== Transportation ===
Carrying is the main way to transport things, while using a gui or back carrier is also popular. Baskets may be carried with the aid of tump lines tied around the carrier's forehead; at times, pack horses are used. Along large rivers, the Tai are famous for transporting goods and people using swallow-tailed boats.

=== Social organization ===
The original social structure is called ban muong, also known as the phia tao regime. The Tai lineage is called Dam. Each person has three key lineal relationships: Ai Nong (everybody born from a common fourth-generation ancestor); Lung Ta (every male member of the wife's family throughout generations); and Ying Sao (every male member of the sons-in-law).

=== Marriage ===
In the past, the Tai respected the selling and buying of marriage and the son-in-law's staying with the girl's family. To marry a husband, the girl's family needs to take two basic steps:

Up marriage (dong khun) - means the introduction and bringing of the son-in-law to live with the girl's family, which is done to test his personality and hard work. Tai women generally adopt the custom of wearing their hair in a bun or chignon immediately after this first wedding ceremony. The son-in-law will stay at his wife's home for 8 to 12 years.

Down marriage (dong long) - the bringing of the couple and their family to the paternal family.

=== Birth ===
Women give birth in the seated position. The placenta is put into a bamboo cylinder and hung on a branch in the forest. The mother is warmed by fire, fed rice using a bamboo tube, and must abstain from certain foods for a month. The bamboo tubes are hung on a tree branch. There are rituals to educate the child in gender-specific work and a Lung Ta (title meaning "Great Uncle" who is a respected elder of the community, i.e. Great Uncle Bob, Lung Ta Bob) is invited to the house to name the baby.

=== Funerals ===
There are two steps in a funeral: Pong: The bringing of offerings to the deceased and bringing the deceased to the forest for a burial (White Tai) or cremation (Black Tai). Xong: Calling the spirit to come back and live in the section of the house reserved for the worshipping of ancestors...

=== New house ===
Showing the host his new house, the Lung Ta kindles a new fire. In celebrating a new house, people carry out spiritual rites on the spot, reading spiritual texts to drive away bad lucks and to bring good lucks, and to worship ancestors.

=== Festivals ===
The Black Tai worship their ancestors on the 7th and 8th month of the Lunar Year. The White Tai also celebrate the new year according to the lunar calendar. Villagers also worship the gods of land, mountain, water and the soul of the central post of the village.

=== Calendar ===
The Tai calendar follows the ancient horoscope or cosmology (which contains 12 key animals) like the lunar calendar. But the Black Tai calendar has a time difference of six months.

=== Artistic activities ===
The Tai Dam perform their xoe dance and play many kinds of flutes. They sing out verses and vivid alternate songs.

== See also ==
- Hmong people
- Khmu people
- Nyaw people
