= Hưng Hóa province =

Tỉnh Hưng Hóa (省興化)
- Province of the Nguyễn dynasty and the French protectorate of Tonkin, French Indochina
- 1830–1903
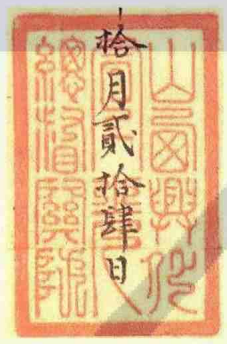
- Great Seal of the Tổng đốc of Sơn Hưng Tuyên

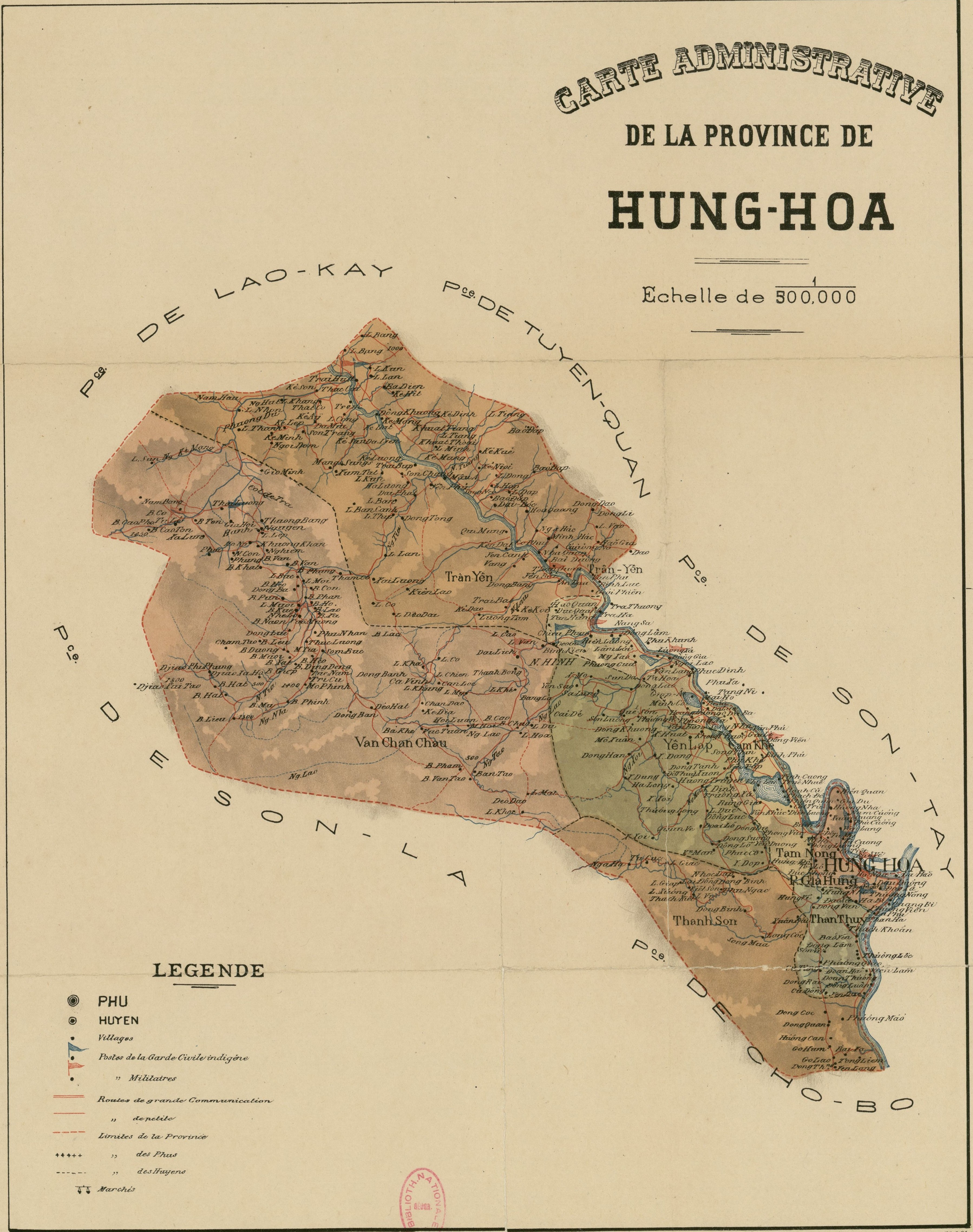
- Hưng Hóa province in 1891
- Capital: Hưng Hóa
- History
  - Established: 1830
  - Disestablished: 1903
Preceded by
| Hưng Hóa region |
| Sip Song Chau Tai |
Succeeded by
| Chợ Bờ province |
| 4th Military Territory |
| Lào Cai province |
| Lai Châu province |
| Phú Thọ province |
- Today part of: Vietnam

Hưng Hóa was a former province of Vietnam during the Nguyễn dynasty that located the region what is present-day northwest Vietnam. Its capital was the citadel of Hưng Hóa. The province was taken by French troops commanded by Brière de l'Isle in 1884 from Chinese mercenary Black Flags.

== Background ==
Before the 15th century, the Black River basin was the homeland of various hill polities and ethnic groups, such as Muang Then and Ngưu Hống of Tai Dam people. Among them, Ngưu Hống was a Vietnamese tributary state. In 1416, the Chinese Ming dynasty annexed Ngưu Hống. In 1431 the Vietnamese king Lê Lợi subdued them and captured the Muang Le leader Đèo Cát Hãn, who submitted as a vassal. Since then, the Đèo clan of White Tai had maintained themselves as the autonomous head of counties (tri châu) of Hưng Hóa region (Vietnamese collective designation for the whole region). They also paid tribute to neighbouring China, Burma, and Luang Phabang.

The Vietnamese tightened their control over Hưng Hóa in the eighteenth century. Both the heads of counties (châu) and districts (huyện) were held by Kinh (Vietnamese) mandarins tri châu and tri huyện. Hưng Hóa was divided into 44 châu and 163 huyện.

== Reorganization ==
At the time when the Nguyễn dynasty was established in 1802, Hưng Hóa was categorised as a trấn (protectorate). In 1830, Hưng Hóa was reorganised as a province with following districts:

- Tam Nông District
- Thanh Sơn
- Thanh Thủy
- Mai Châu
- Đà Bắc
- Phù Yên
- Mộc Châu
- Yên Châu
- Mai Sơn
- Sơn La
- Thuận Châu
- Quỳnh Nhai
- Tủa Chùa
- Tuần Giáo
- Lai Châu
- Ninh Biên
- Yên Lập
- Văn Chấn
- Trấn Yên
- Văn Bàn
- Chiêu Tấn
- Thủy Vĩ

The Deos continued to pay annual tribute to the Hue court to assert their semi-autonomous status while also paying tribute to the Thai court via Laotian kingdoms. The headquarters of the Deos were relocated to Lai Châu. Around 1840s, Deo lord Đèo Văn Trị saw the Hmong people from China migrated and settled on his lands in Lai Châu. When the Yellow Flags from China attacked in 1872, the Deos successfully resisted the invaders and were rewarded by Vietnamese emperor Tu Duc. Deo Van Seng was rewarded as the tri châu of Ninh Biên district, while his son Đèo Văn Trị was appointed as the tri châu of Lai Châu district. French forces took Hưng Hóa in April 1884. The province therefore had been reorganised many times by French administration from 1887 to 1900. Finally, the last remnant of Hưng Hóa was absorbed by the new Phú Thọ province in 1903.
