= Mường La =

- Commune
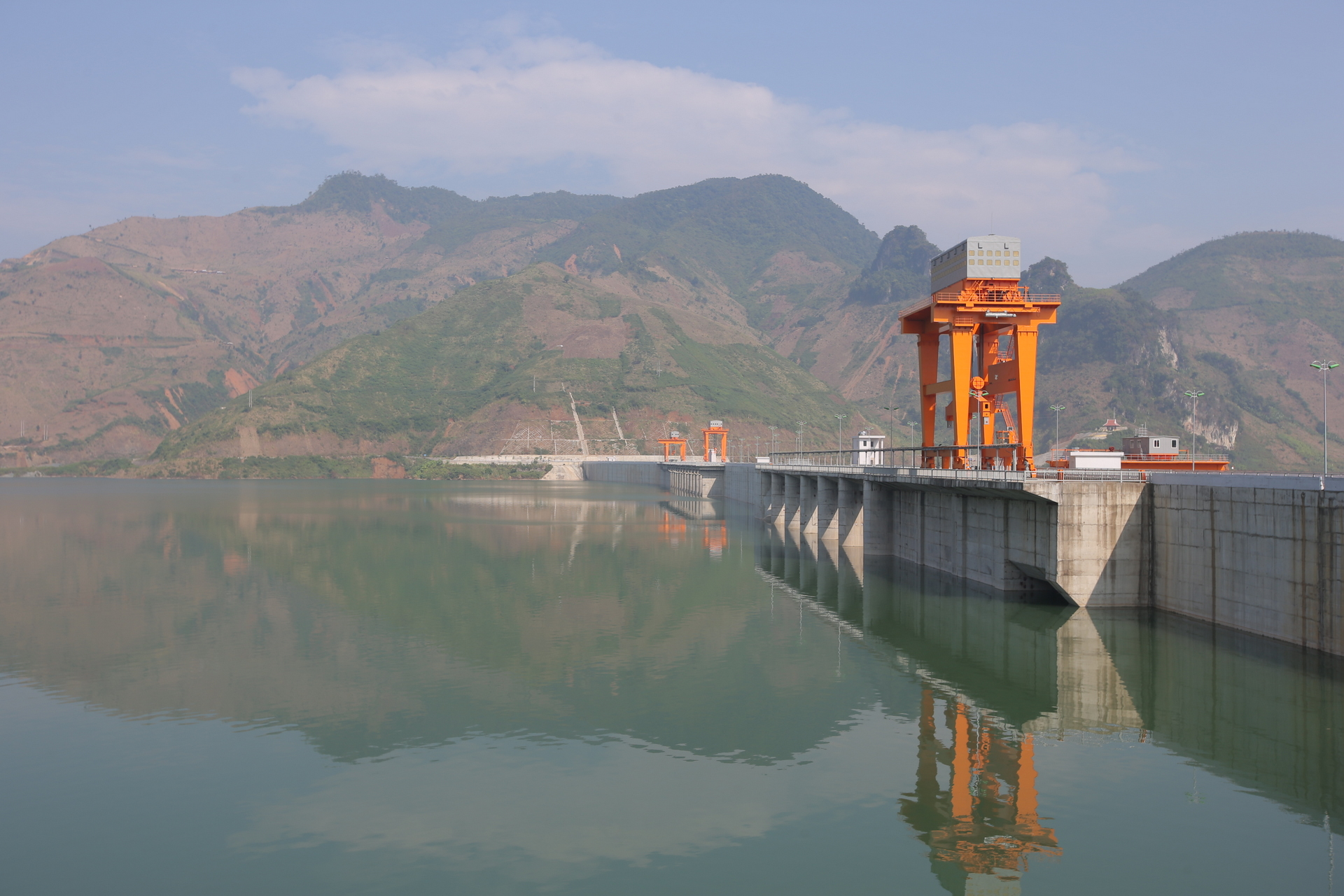
- Sơn La Hydropower Reservoir
- Interactive map of Mường La
- Coordinates: 21.55045604696148°N 104.29386868743785°E
- Country: Vietnam
- Province: Sơn La
- Region: Northwest
- Established: 16 June 2025
- Seat: Tiểu khu 3

Area
  - Total: 341.86 km^{2} (131.99 sq mi)

Population (2024)
  - Total: 32,712
  - Density: 95/km^{2} (250/sq mi)
- Website: muongla.sonla.gov.vn

Mường La is a commune in Sơn La province, Vietnam.

== History ==
Ít Ong township was formerly part of Mường La district, Sơn La province. It was established on 8 January 2007 from 2,193.2 hectares of natural area and a population of 13,895 from Ít Ong commune; 766.8 hectares and a population of 2,258 from Nậm Păm commune; 272 hectares from Tạ Bú commune; and 253 hectares from Liệp Tè commune in Thuận Châu district. At the time of its establishment, the township had an area of 3,485 hectares and a population of 16,153, with a population density of 463.5 inhabitants per km².

On 16 June 2025:

- The National Assembly of Vietnam adopted Resolution No. 203/2025/QH15 amending and supplementing several articles of the Constitution of the Socialist Republic of Vietnam. The resolution provided for the cessation of district-level administrative units nationwide from 1 July 2025.
- The Standing Committee of the National Assembly of Vietnam adopted Resolution No. 1681/NQ-UBTVQH15 on the reorganization of commune-level administrative units in Sơn La province in 2025. Under the resolution, the entire natural area and population of Ít Ong township and Nặm Păm, Chiềng San, Chiềng Muôn, Mường Trai, and Pi Toong communes in Mường La district were consolidated to form a new commune named Mường La.
