= Sơn La (city) =

- Provincial city (Class-3)
- Sơn La City; Thành phố Sơn La
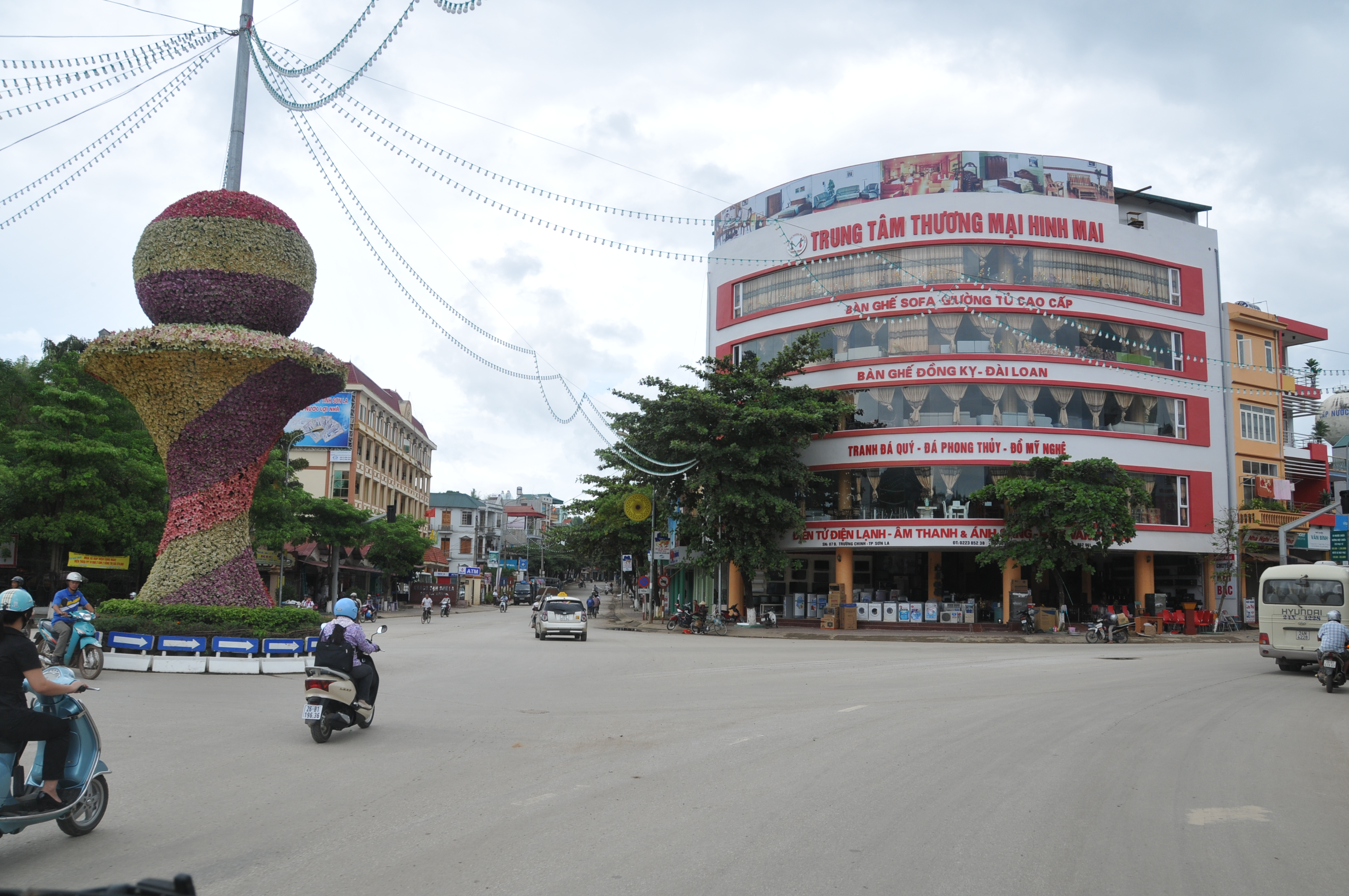

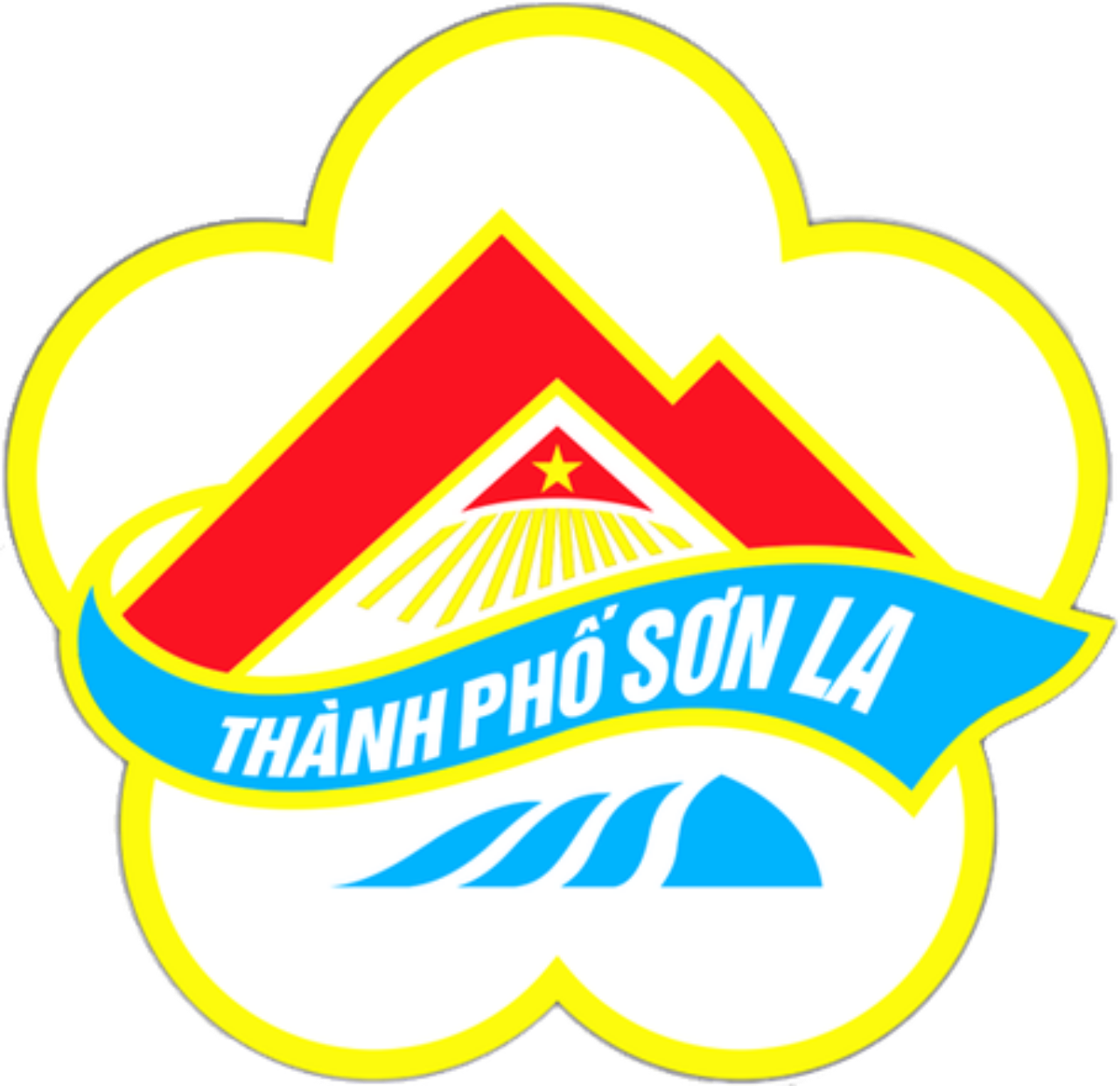
- Seal
- Interactive map of Sơn La
- Location of Sơn La in Vietnam Sơn La (Southeast Asia) Sơn La (Asia)
- Coordinates: 21°19′37″N 103°54′51″E
- Country: Vietnam
- Province: Sơn La

Area
  - Total: 323.51 km^{2} (124.91 sq mi)

Population (2019)
  - Total: 106,052
  - Density: 327.82/km^{2} (849.04/sq mi)
- Climate: Cwa
- Website: thanhpho.sonla.gov.vn

Sơn La (Tai Dam: ꪹꪎꪷꪙꪨꪱ) is a former city in the north-west region of Vietnam. It is the capital of Sơn La Province. It is bordered by Thuận Châu District, Mường La District, and Mai Sơn District.

== History ==
In the era of the Sip Hoc Chau Tai, Sơn La was a fort of the Black Tai.

== Demographics ==
As of 2019 the city had a population of 106,052, covering an area of 323.5 km^{2}.

== Administrative divisions ==
Sơn La City is divided into 12 commune-level sub-divisions, including 7 wards (Chiềng An, Chiềng Cơi, Chiềng Lề, Chiềng Sinh, Quyết Tâm, Quyết Thắng, Tô Hiệu) and 5 rural communes (Chiềng Cọ, Chiềng Đen, Chiềng Ngần, Chiềng Xôm, Hua La).

== Climate ==
Like most of Northern Vietnam, Sơn La has a dry-winter humid subtropical climate (Köppen climate classification: Cwa), affected by the East Asian monsoons.

Climate data for Sơn La
Month	Jan	Feb	Mar	Apr	May	Jun	Jul	Aug	Sep	Oct	Nov	Dec	Year
Record high °C (°F)	31.5 (88.7)	34.6 (94.3)	36.6 (97.9)	38.2 (100.8)	39.2 (102.6)	37.0 (98.6)	35.3 (95.5)	35.0 (95.0)	34.8 (94.6)	33.9 (93.0)	32.0 (89.6)	30.7 (87.3)	39.2 (102.6)
Mean daily maximum °C (°F)	21.0 (69.8)	23.3 (73.9)	27.0 (80.6)	29.7 (85.5)	30.6 (87.1)	30.0 (86.0)	29.6 (85.3)	29.7 (85.5)	29.2 (84.6)	27.2 (81.0)	24.4 (75.9)	21.6 (70.9)	27.0 (80.6)
Daily mean °C (°F)	14.9 (58.8)	16.9 (62.4)	20.3 (68.5)	23.3 (73.9)	24.9 (76.8)	25.3 (77.5)	25.1 (77.2)	24.8 (76.6)	23.9 (75.0)	21.7 (71.1)	18.4 (65.1)	15.4 (59.7)	21.2 (70.2)
Mean daily minimum °C (°F)	10.9 (51.6)	12.5 (54.5)	15.6 (60.1)	18.7 (65.7)	20.9 (69.6)	22.2 (72.0)	22.2 (72.0)	21.9 (71.4)	20.4 (68.7)	18.0 (64.4)	14.5 (58.1)	11.2 (52.2)	17.4 (63.3)
Record low °C (°F)	−0.5 (31.1)	3.9 (39.0)	4.8 (40.6)	8.4 (47.1)	13.7 (56.7)	15.2 (59.4)	17.2 (63.0)	15.4 (59.7)	13.4 (56.1)	7.0 (44.6)	3.6 (38.5)	−0.2 (31.6)	−0.5 (31.1)
Average rainfall mm (inches)	24.9 (0.98)	23.8 (0.94)	49.3 (1.94)	115.4 (4.54)	182.8 (7.20)	236.5 (9.31)	267.7 (10.54)	264.8 (10.43)	137.9 (5.43)	62.0 (2.44)	34.8 (1.37)	18.8 (0.74)	1,415.6 (55.73)
Average rainy days	4.8	4.5	6.4	12.4	16.8	18.9	21.6	19.9	13.2	7.8	4.5	3.6	134.3
Average relative humidity (%)	79.0	75.7	72.6	74.6	77.8	82.9	85.0	85.6	84.0	81.9	80.7	79.1	79.9
Mean monthly sunshine hours	142.9	143.9	171.5	193.5	204.6	150.4	150.6	164.8	179.5	177.8	164.6	164.9	2,005.7
Source: Vietnam Institute for Building Science and Technology
