= Sip Song Chau Tai =

Confederation

Tai Federation Sip Song Chau Tai (1947–1950) Sip Hoc Chau Tai (1950–1955)
- before 17th century–1954
- Flag Coat of arms

- Seal (1889–1945)

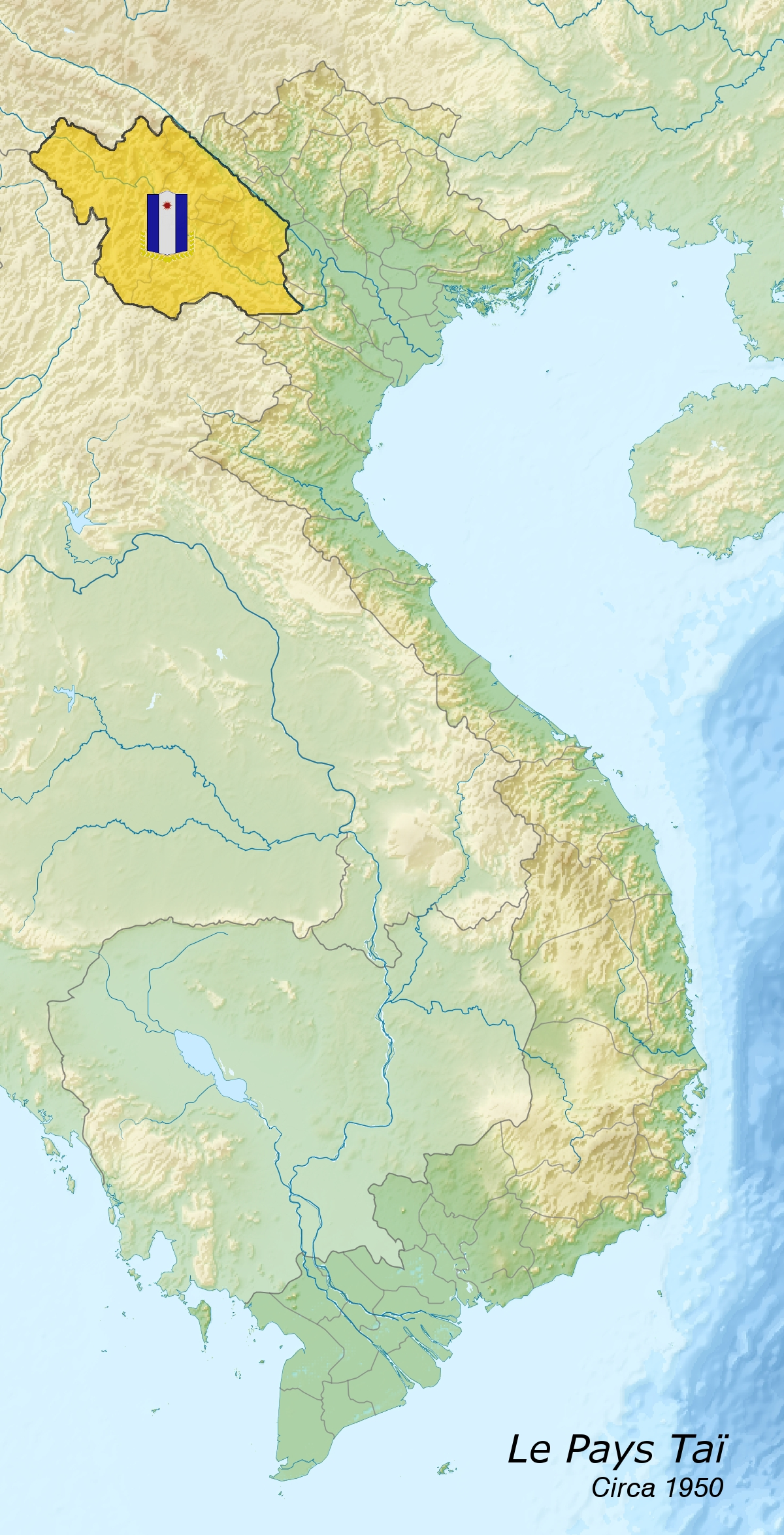
- Status: Autonomous administrative division within Tonkin, French Indochina (1889–1948); Autonomous federation within the French Union (1948–50); Crown domain of the Vietnamese Emperor (1950–54)
- Capital: none (before 1948); Muaeng Lai (1948–54)
- Common languages: French, Tai, Kinh
- Religion: Catholicism (official); Daoism; Traditional religions
- Historical era: New Imperialism
  - Established: before 17th century
  - Disestablished: 1954
- Currency: French Indochinese piastre
Preceded by	Succeeded by
Ngưu Hống	North Vietnam
- Today part of: Vietnam

The Sip Song Chau Tai (Note: Other spellings include: Sip Song Chau Thai, Sipsong Chuthai, Sipsong Chu Tai, Sip Song Chu Tai, Sipsongchuthai, Sip Song Chu Thai, Sipsong Chau Tai, Sip Song Chao Thai, Sipsong Chao Tai, Sipsongchutai, Sipsong Chao Thai.) ("Twelve Tai cantons"; Vietnamese: Mười hai châu Thái or Mười hai xứ Thái; Thai: สิบสองจุไท or สิบสองเจ้าไท; Lao: ສິບສອງຈຸໄຕ or ສິບສອງເຈົ້າໄຕ; Chinese: 泰族十二州; Tai Dam: ꪵꪠ꪿ꪙꪒꪲꪙꪼꪕ "Tai Federation") was a confederation of Tai Dam ("Black Tai"), Tai Dón ("White Tai") and Tai Daeng ("Red Tai") chiefdoms in the mountainous north-west of today's Vietnam, dating back at least to the 17th century.

It became an autonomous part of the French protectorate of Tonkin, and thereby of French Indochina, in 1889. In 1948, during the period of the First Indochina War, it was transformed into the Tai Federation (French: Fédération Taï, Vietnamese: Thái liên-đoàn) that was recognized as an autonomous component of the French Union.

In 1950 it was made a crown domain of Vietnamese emperor Bảo Đại without being integrated into the State of Vietnam. It was dissolved after the Geneva Agreements of 1954.

== Name ==
The number Sip Song is Tai language for twelve, as with Thai "twelve" (12, ๑๒, สิบสอง, sip song, Thai pronunciation: [sìp sɔ̌ːŋ]). A parallel etymology with the number twelve can also be found in the place name Sip Song Panna (Xishuangbanna) in China.

Chau is land (similar to sino-Vietnamese 州 and not to be confused with similar sounding Thai chau, lord) and Tai (ไต๋, Chinese 傣).

== History ==
=== Early history ===
Tai peoples have settled in the northwestern parts of what now is Vietnam since the early first millennium CE or, at the latest, the fifth to eighth century.

They mainly settled along the Black River (Sông Đà). One Black Tai chiefdom—located at the place today known as Điện Biên Phủ—was named Muang Thaeng, just like the legendary kingdom of Khun Borom, protagonist of a Tai creation myth and believed to be the progenitor of the Lao, Thai, Shan and other Tai peoples, who later spread to the territories of modern Laos, Thailand, Burma, northeast India and the south of China's Yunnan province.

Like in other Tai societies, the core social units of the Tai Dam, Tai Dón and Tai Daeng were the village (ban) and the chiefdom (mueang, Vietnamese mường), each consisting of several villages and ruled by a feudal lord (chao). Their base of life was wet rice cultivation, which is why the Tai settled in valleys alongside the course of rivers. A number (first 12 - then 16) of these mueang, situated in the modern-day provinces of Điện Biên, Lai Châu, Sơn La as well as western parts of Lào Cai and Yên Bái grouped together and formed a long-term alliance, called Sip Song Chau Tai.

Usually one of the lords was considered senior to the others, but each of them maintained the power over his chiefdom. The alliance has been formalized since at least the 17th century, but the chiefdoms never merged into one homogenous state. The number of mueangs belonging to the confederation altered during the course of time, but the number "twelve" was kept in the name for symbolic reasons.

In premodern Southeast Asia's complex political geography, Sip Song Chau Tai lay at the intersection of several larger mandalas (circles of influence): At different times, it had to pay tribute to China, Vietnam, Lan Xang/Luang Phrabang (in today's Laos) and/or Siam (Thailand). Nevertheless, the Tai chiefdoms always maintained their autonomy in internal affairs.

=== French Indochina ===
Even though the upland Tai had stronger ethnic and cultural ties to Laos, Sip Song Chau Tai was incorporated into the French protectorate of Tonkin—and therefore French Indochina—after 1888. This was arranged by the French explorer and colonial representative Auguste Pavie who signed a treaty with Đèo Văn Trị, the White Tai lord of Muang Lay (Lai Châu) on 7 April 1889.

Thereby the Sip Song Chau Tai accepted the French overlordship, while the colonial power promised to respect the positions of the Tai lords and their autonomy in internal affairs.

Following Đèo Văn Trị's death, leadership of the White Tai passed to his third son Đèo Văn Long, passing over the second son. After the Japanese coup of 1945, Đèo Văn Long fled Lai Chau with retreating French units. On his return, with the assistance of a Eurasian agricultural official named Louis Bordier, Đèo Văn Long was reestablished, and the French agreed to honor the terms of Pavie's 1889 agreement with Long's father. Bordier married Long's daughter and as his son-in-law proceeded to direct military operations of the White Tai against the Black Tai at Son La who supported the Viet Minh. Several Tai companies fought alongside the French in the First Indochina War, against both the communist Viet Minh and the nationalist Việt Nam Quốc Dân Đảng (VNQDD), probably motivated by their distrust vis-à-vis the lowland Vietnamese and their wish to retain the autonomy they enjoyed under the French.

=== Tai Federation ===
In 1948, the French colonial administration declared the Tai Federation (French: Fédération Thaï, native name: Phen Din Tai, Vietnamese: Khu tự trị Thái; by that time consisting of 19 Tai states in then three Vietnamese provinces of Lai Châu, Sơn La and Phong Thổ) to be an independent component of the French Union. It had its own flag, constitution and parliament. Đèo Văn Long was appointed president for life and Lai Châu was chosen as the capital.

The Tai Federation was however not only populated by Tai peoples, but also other "hill tribes" (montagnards), including Hmong, Yao, Yi (Lolo) and Khmu. They were labeled as "sub-minorities" and treated inferior to the Tais. Đèo Văn Long monopolized all the state power in his person and family, as well as the opium trade (which was tolerated by the French). In 1950, the Tai Federation was made a crown domain of the French-installed Vietnamese emperor Bảo Đại, but not an integrated part of the State of Vietnam. Bảo Đại refrained from delegating a governor to Lai Châu, but rather left the power in the hands of Đèo Văn Long and the Tai lords. The emperor visited his domain only once, in 1952.

Many of the subjugated groups supported the Viet Minh on their advance to the Northwest starting in 1952. There were also rising tensions between the different Tai groups and their lords. Đèo Văn Long had simply dismissed the Black Tai lord of Muang Thaeng (Dien Bien Phu), Lò Văn Hặc, and replaced him by his own son. The disempowered chief and many members of his tribe joined forces with the Viet Minh to both seek retaliation against the Đèo family and to dislodge the dominance of the White Tai. Following the death of Đèo Văn Long's oldest son, his third son Deo Van Un took command of 4,000 White Tai partisans, but was killed at the Battle of Dien Bien Phu of March to May 1954. When the Viet Minh attacked the Lai Châu town in December 1953, Đèo Văn Long was evacuated by the French army to Hanoi, then departed to Laos and finally went into exile in France. The Geneva Agreements of July 1954 awarded the whole of North Vietnam to the communist-led Democratic Republic (DRV) and dissolved the autonomous Tai Federation, marking the end of the centuries-old rule of the feudal lords. Thousands of Tais left their native land and emigrated to France, Australia and the United States (mainly settling in Iowa).

=== Democratic Republic of Vietnam ===
In order to avoid ethnic tensions, the DRV designated its northwestern provinces of Lai Châu, Sơn La and Nghĩa Lộ as the "Tai-Meo [i.e. Hmong] Autonomous Region" (Vietnamese: Khu Tự trị Thái-Mèo), modeled on the national autonomies of communist China. It was renamed the "Northwest Autonomous Region" (Khu Tự trị Tây Bắc) in 1961, in order to not highlight just two of the many ethnic groups in this zone. The autonomy was rescinded after the Vietnamese reunification of 1975.

Following Đèo Văn Long's death in 1975, his title and position among the exile community of the "Pays Taï" passed to his daughter Deo Nang Toï, who has lived in Paris until her death in 2008.

== Political organization ==
Sip Song Chau Tai had a class-based society made up of the chao (lord) and pai (commoner). It was organized loosely with twelve or sixteen principalities called chau muang, which established their relationships with each other through intermarriage and warfare. Other ethnic groups living in the area were known as Sa, outsiders, and not included into the Tai principality system. Each chau muang was made up of four to five muang (districts), including a chiang (core district) and three to four muang nok (peripheral districts).

The original twelve chau muang were as follows, although the names differ slightly from one account to another and can be preceded by chau/chou instead of muang:

1. Muang Lo (Nghĩa Lộ or Văn Chấn)
2. Muang Muay (Thuận Châu)
3. Muang Lay (old Lai Châu or Mường Lay)
4. Muang Thaeng (Điện Biên Phủ)
5. Muang La (Sơn La)
6. Muang Mua (Mai Sơn)
7. Muang Sang (Mộc Châu)
8. Muang So (Phong Thổ)
9. Muang Toek (Phù Yên and Bắc Yên)
10. Muang Vat (Yên Châu)
11. Muang Chian (Quỳnh Nhai)
12. Muang Than (Than Uyên)

An additional four chau muang were added after the arrival of the French:

1. Muang Khoa (Bình Du)
2. Muang Kway (Tuần Giáo)
3. Muang Chanh (unidentified)
4. Muang Nam Ma (unidentified)

== See also ==
- Shan States
- Sipsongpanna
- United Front for the Liberation of Oppressed Races
