= Sốp Cộp district =

Coordinates: 20°56′21″N 103°35′49″E

Sốp Cộp District Huyện Sốp Cộp
- District
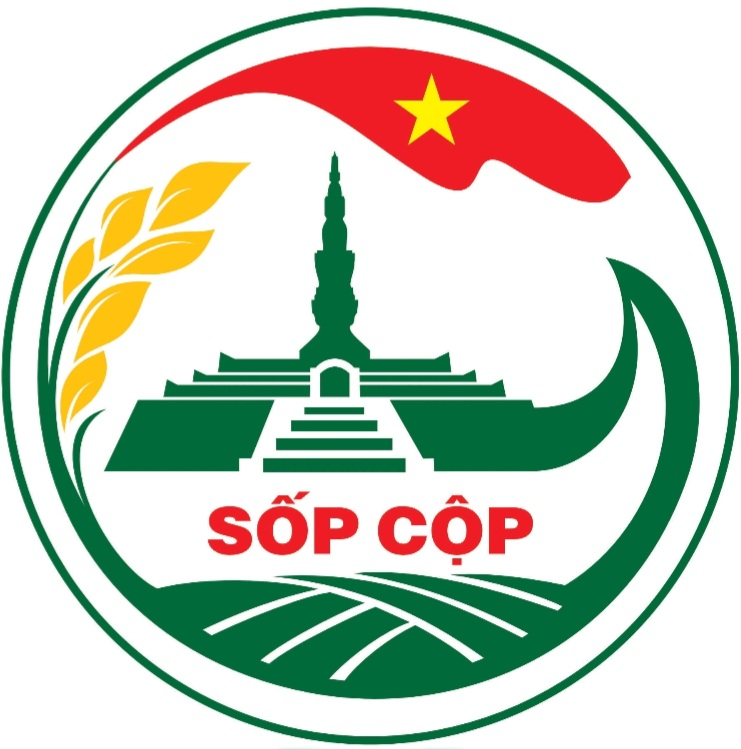
- Seal
- Interactive map of Sốp Cộp District
- Country: Vietnam
- Region: Northwest
- Province: Sơn La
- Capital: Sốp Cộp

Area
  - Total: 570 sq mi (1,477 km^{2})

Population (2003)
  - Total: 32,253
- Time zone: UTC+7 (UTC + 7)

Sốp Cộp is a former rural district of Sơn La province in the Northwest region of Vietnam. It was established in December 2003. As of 2003, the district had a population of 32,253. The district covers an area of 1,477 km^{2}.

There are eight communes in the district: Sốp Cộp, Mường Lạn, Dồm Cang, Sam Kha, Mường Và, Mường Lèo, Púng Bánh, and Nậm Lạnh. The district capital is at Sốp Cộp, which borders Laos to the east and south, Điện Biên province to the west, and Sông Mã district to the north. Most of the district is mountainous. The land is relatively fertile and suitable for industrial crops and cattle.

The district is home to an ethnic Lao community.
