= Mai Sơn =

- Commune
- Interactive map of Mai Sơn
- Coordinates: 21.198419320554684°N 104.10561077305253°E
- Country: Vietnam
- Province: Sơn La
- Region: Northwest
- Established: 16 June 2025

Area
  - Total: 164.40 km^{2} (63.48 sq mi)

Population (2024)
  - Total: 52,361
  - Density: 318/km^{2} (820/sq mi)
- Website: maison.sonla.gov.vn

Mai Sơn is a commune in Sơn La province, Vietnam. It is also the most populous administrative division in Sơn La province.

== History ==
The area of present-day Mai Sơn commune formerly belonged to Mai Sơn district, Sơn La province.

On 16 June 2025:

- The National Assembly of Vietnam adopted Resolution No. 203/2025/QH15 amending and supplementing several articles of the Constitution of the Socialist Republic of Vietnam. The resolution provided for the cessation of district-level administrative units nationwide from 1 July 2025.
- The Standing Committee of the National Assembly of Vietnam adopted Resolution No. 1681/NQ-UBTVQH15 on the reorganization of commune-level administrative units in Sơn La province in 2025. Under the resolution, the entire natural area and population of Hát Lót township, Hát Lót commune, and Cò Nòi commune were consolidated to form a new commune named Mai Sơn. The resolution took effect on 16 June 2025.
