= Ngưu Hống =

Historical princely states inhabited by the Tai Dam people

Ngưu Hống Ngưu Hống (Vietnamese) Heishui Guo (Chinese)
- 1000?–1416 or 1432
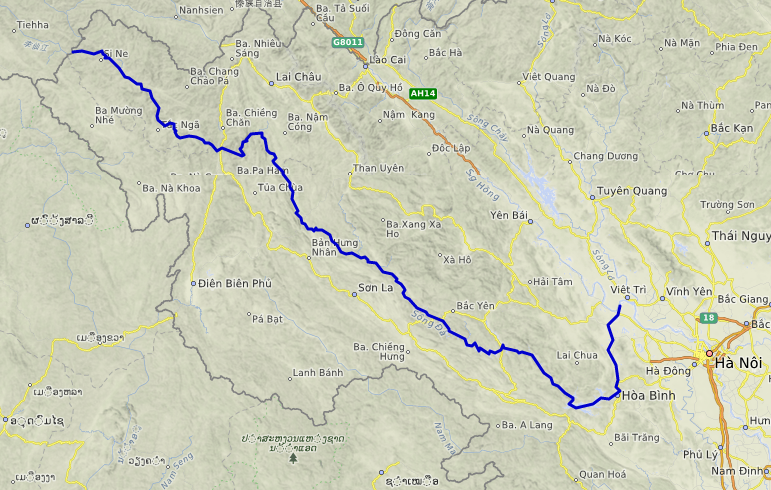
- Map of the Black River throughout northwest Vietnam
- Capital: Mường Mỗi
- Common languages: Black Tai, Vietnamese
- Religion: Theravada Buddhism, Mahayana Buddhism, animism
- Government: Monarchy
  - 11th century–1067: Lạng Chượng
  - 1292–1329: Lò Lẹt
  - 1329–1341: Con Mường
  - 1341–1392: Ta Cằm
  - 1392–1418: Ta Ngần
  - 1420–1441: Mứn Hằm
- History
  - First tribute to Dai Viet: 1067
  - Mongol invasions: 1250s
  - Annexed by Ming dynasty: 1416
  - Annexed by Dai Viet: 1432
Preceded by
Nanzhao
Muang Then
Succeeded by
Jiaozhi Province
Dai Viet
Sip Song Chau Tai

Ngưu Hống (chữ Hán: 牛吼) or Heishui (Chinese: 黑水, lit. 'Black river') were names for a medieval Black Tai polity located in northwest Vietnam, mainly around the Black River. Its territory comprises modern-day provinces of Điện Biên, Lai Châu, Sơn La as well as western parts of Lào Cai and Yên Bái.

== Early period ==
Tai peoples have settled in the northwestern parts of what now is Vietnam since the early first millennium CE or, at the latest, the 5th to 8th century. They mainly settled along the Black River (Sông Đà). One Black Tai chiefdom—located at the place today known as Điện Biên Phủ—was named Muang Thaeng, just like the legendary kingdom of Khun Borom, protagonist of a Tai creation myth and believed to be the progenitor of the Lao, Thai, Shan and other Tai peoples, who later spread to the territories of modern Laos, Thailand, Burma, northeast India and the south of China's Yunnan province.

In early eleventh century, Lạng Chượng, leader of the Black Tai, led his people from Mường Lò, westward toward Mường Chiềng An (Mường La District), Mường Thanh (Điện Biên Phủ), and set up a new kingdom. The chronicle Đại Việt sử lược called this polity Ngưu Hống (cobra). In 1067 they sent a tribute gift to Dai Viet court of king Ly Thanh Tong (r. 1054–1072): gold, silver, aromatic woods, rhinoceros horns and elephant tusks. A Chinese source in 12th century identified this chiefdom as Heishou Guo (Black River Kingdom), and its location was between Dali and Dai Viet kingdoms. During late 13th/early 14th century, Lò Lẹt, the Black Thai ruler, went conflict with Dai Viet ruler Trần Minh Tông on the Black River (Xoong nạp tát tè).

== Ming and Later Lê conquest ==
Following the Ming conquest of Dai Viet in 1407, the Chinese subjugated the Black Tai kingdom in 1416. However the Chinese rule was short-lived. After driving out the Chinese in 1427, the Vietnamese emperor Lê Lợi sent two campaigns in 1431 and 1432 into the region and incorporated Black Tai territories in Dai Viet's province of Hưng Hoá. The old independence polity experienced population expansion during the 15th century. In Gia Hưng District (Sơn La and Lai Châu), the number of villages grew by five times. The incorporation of Black Tai lands into Dai Viet's territories provided significant economic benefits: Cobalt salts, the main ingredient for Vietnamese blue-white ceramics, were sneaked in large quantity from Yunnanese mines to Dai Viet through Hưng Hoá, which before 1433 the cobalt salts had to be imported from Middle East.
