= Sông Mã (disambiguation) =

Sông Mã is a commune of Sơn La province.

Sông Mã may refer to:

- Mã River, a river in Vietnam and Laos
- Sông Mã district, a former district of Sơn La province, Vietnam
- Sông Mã Range along the border between Laos and Vietnam
