= Chiềng Sơ =

- Commune
- Interactive map of Chiềng Sơ
- Coordinates: 21.127573910625813°N 103.65054856378418°E
- Country: Vietnam
- Province: Sơn La
- Region: Northwest
- Established: 16 June 2025

Area
  - Total: 140.31 km^{2} (54.17 sq mi)

Population (2025)
  - Total: 17,145
  - Density: 122/km^{2} (320/sq mi)

Chiềng Sơ is a commune in Sơn La province, Vietnam.

== History ==
Chiềng Sơ commune formerly belonged to Sông Mã district, Sơn La province.

On 16 June 2025:

- The National Assembly of Vietnam adopted Resolution No. 203/2025/QH15 amending and supplementing several articles of the Constitution of the Socialist Republic of Vietnam. The resolution provided for the cessation of district-level administrative units nationwide from 1 July 2025.
- The Standing Committee of the National Assembly of Vietnam adopted Resolution No. 1681/NQ-UBTVQH15 on the reorganization of commune-level administrative units in Sơn La province in 2025. Under the resolution, the entire natural area and population of Yên Hưng and Chiềng Sơ communes were consolidated to form a new commune named Chiềng Sơ. The resolution took effect on 16 June 2025.
