= Bắc Yên district =

Coordinates: 21.250°N 104.417°E

Bắc Yên district Huyện Bắc Yên
- District
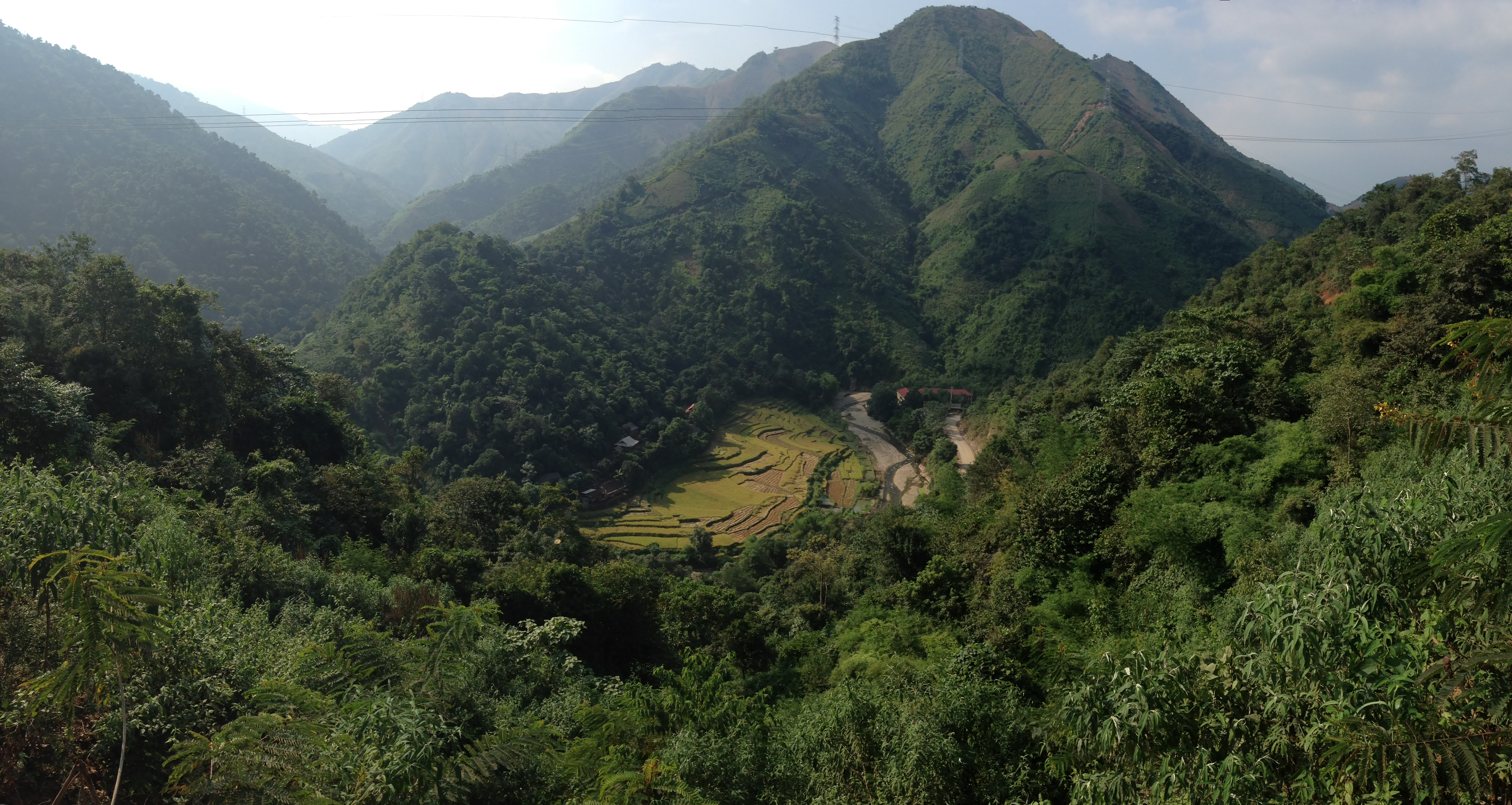
- Panoramic view of Ban Phuc
- Interactive map of Bắc Yên district
- Country: Vietnam
- Region: Northwest
- Province: Sơn La
- Capital: Bắc Yên

Area
  - Total: 419 sq mi (1,085 km^{2})

Population (2003)
  - Total: 48,877
- Time zone: UTC+7 (UTC + 7)

Bắc Yên is a former rural district of Sơn La province in the Northwest region of Vietnam. As of 2003, the district had a population of 48,877. The district covers an area of 1,085 km^{2}. The district capital lies at Bắc Yên.

== Climate ==
Climate data for Bắc Yên
Month	Jan	Feb	Mar	Apr	May	Jun	Jul	Aug	Sep	Oct	Nov	Dec	Year
Mean daily maximum °C (°F)	18.9 (66.0)	21.2 (70.2)	24.7 (76.5)	28.6 (83.5)	30.0 (86.0)	30.0 (86.0)	29.6 (85.3)	29.3 (84.7)	28.2 (82.8)	26.0 (78.8)	23.2 (73.8)	20.1 (68.2)	25.8 (78.4)
Daily mean °C (°F)	14.2 (57.6)	15.8 (60.4)	19.0 (66.2)	22.6 (72.7)	24.6 (76.3)	25.4 (77.7)	25.1 (77.2)	24.7 (76.5)	23.7 (74.7)	21.6 (70.9)	18.4 (65.1)	15.1 (59.2)	20.9 (69.6)
Mean daily minimum °C (°F)	11.6 (52.9)	13.0 (55.4)	15.9 (60.6)	19.1 (66.4)	21.4 (70.5)	22.6 (72.7)	22.4 (72.3)	22.1 (71.8)	21.0 (69.8)	18.7 (65.7)	15.5 (59.9)	12.2 (54.0)	18.0 (64.4)
Average rainfall mm (inches)	30.4 (1.20)	22.6 (0.89)	49.7 (1.96)	111.1 (4.37)	196.6 (7.74)	241.5 (9.51)	264.2 (10.40)	271.3 (10.68)	167.9 (6.61)	76.4 (3.01)	30.9 (1.22)	22.3 (0.88)	1,481.9 (58.34)
Average rainy days	5.8	5.2	7.0	12.2	16.5	17.2	19.8	19.5	13.0	9.8	5.9	3.9	135.2
Average relative humidity (%)	83.1	81.2	79.6	79.1	78.8	82.3	84.7	85.7	84.1	82.2	80.3	79.1	81.7
Mean monthly sunshine hours	125.1	129.1	151.0	179.7	195.8	157.7	162.5	160.6	161.6	156.1	150.0	154.2	1,882.4
Source: Vietnam Institute for Building Science and Technology
