= Yên Châu =

- Commune
- Interactive map of Yên Châu
- Coordinates: 21.044228448246237°N 104.30202870037152°E
- Country: Vietnam
- Province: Sơn La
- Region: Northwest
- Established: 16 June 2025

Area
  - Total: 246.55 km^{2} (95.19 sq mi)

Population (2025)
  - Total: 33,061
  - Density: 134/km^{2} (350/sq mi)
- Website: yenchau.sonla.gov.vn

Yên Châu is a commune in Sơn La province, Vietnam.

== History ==
Yên Châu township was established on 28 February 1988 from part of the area and population of Viêng Lán commune.

On 16 June 2025:

- The National Assembly of Vietnam adopted Resolution No. 203/2025/QH15 amending and supplementing several articles of the Constitution of the Socialist Republic of Vietnam. The resolution provided for the cessation of district-level administrative units nationwide from 1 July 2025.
- The Standing Committee of the National Assembly of Vietnam adopted Resolution No. 1681/NQ-UBTVQH15 on the reorganization of commune-level administrative units in Sơn La province in 2025. Under the resolution, the entire natural area and population of Yên Châu township and Chiềng Đông, Chiềng Sàng, Chiềng Pằn, Chiềng Khoi, and Sặp Vạt communes were consolidated to form a new commune named Yên Châu.
