= Phù Yên =

Phù Yên Xã Phù Yên (Vietnamese)
- Commune
- Phù Yên commune
- Location within Vietnam
- Coordinates: 21°15′49″N 104°38′41″E
- Country: Vietnam
- Region: Northwest
- Province: Sơn La
- Time zone: UTC+7 (UTC + 7)

Phù Yên is a commune (xã) of Sơn La Province, Vietnam.
