= Tân Lạc =

- Commune
- Location within Vietnam
- Coordinates: 20°37′16″N 105°16′59″E
- Country: Vietnam
- Region: Northwest
- Province: Phú Thọ
- Time zone: UTC+7 (UTC + 7)

Tân Lạc is a commune of Phú Thọ Province, in the northwestern region of Vietnam.

On June 16, 2025, the Standing Committee of the National Assembly issued Resolution No. 1660/NQ-UBTVQH15 on the reorganization of commune-level administrative units in Phú Thọ Province in 2025 (the resolution took effect on the date of its adoption). Accordingly, the entire natural area and population of Mãn Đức Township and the communes of Ngọc Mỹ (Tân Lạc District), Đông Lai, Thanh Hối, and Tử Nê were consolidated to establish a new commune named Tân Lạc Commune.
