= Mộc Châu (town) =

Mộc Châu Town Thị xã Mộc Châu Mường Mỗi
- District-level town (Class-4)
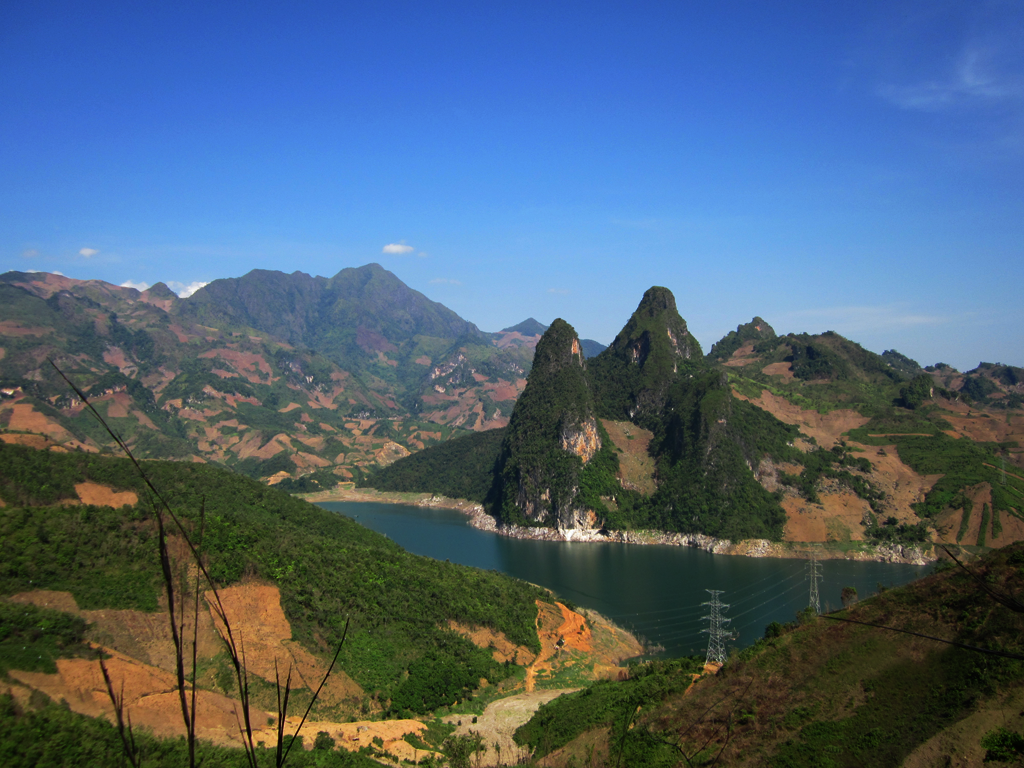
- View from the Mộc-châu Plateau to the Hòa Bình Dam.

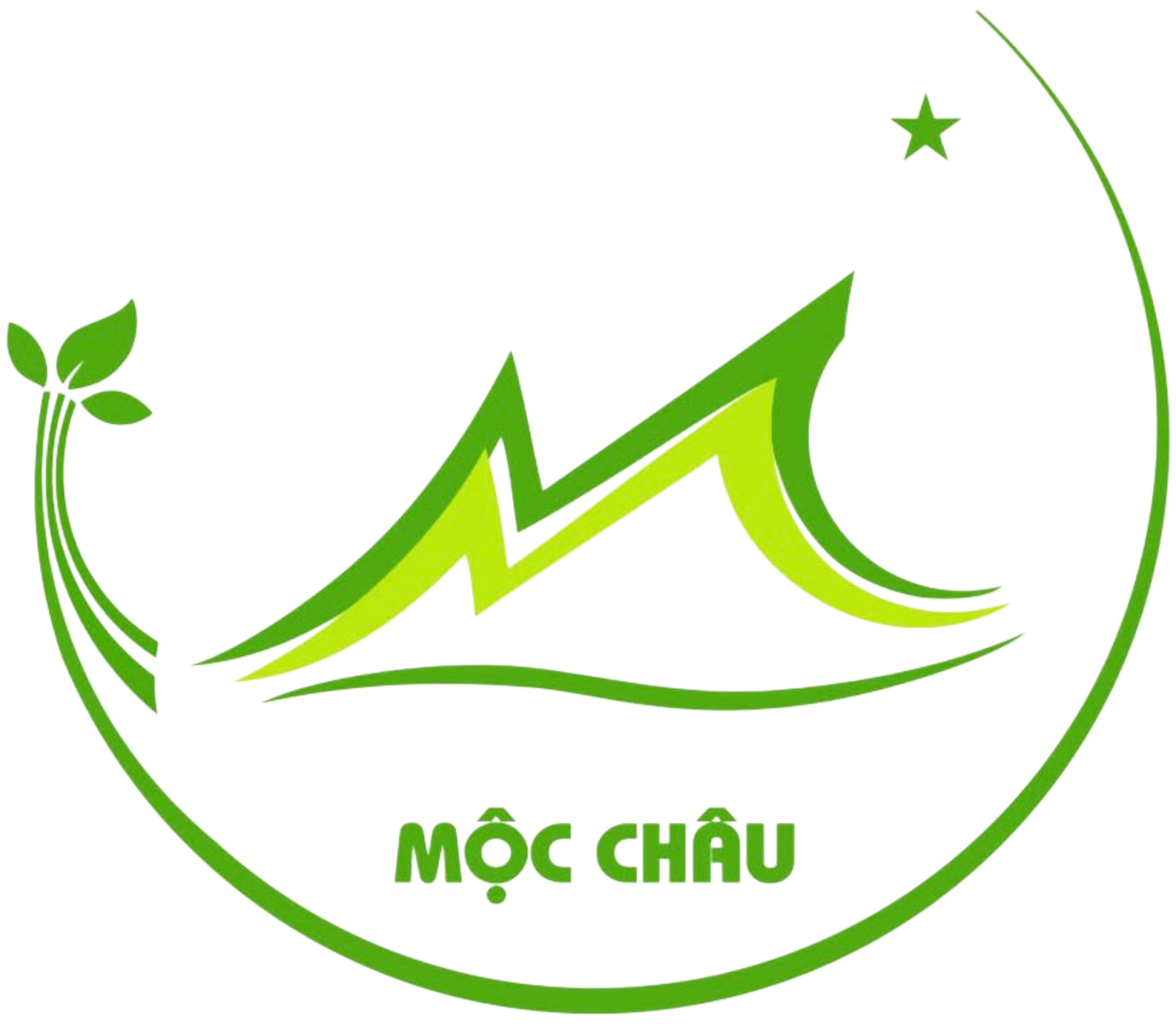
- Seal
- Nickname(s): "The White Meadowland"; Thảo nguyên trắng)
- Motto(s): "The meadowland of the white milk" (Thảo nguyên căng tràn nhựa sống)
- Interactive map of Mộc Châu Town; Thị xã Mộc Châu
- Coordinates: 20°55′19″N 104°45′08″E
- Country: Vietnam
- Region: Northwest
- Province: Sơn La
- Establishment: IX century
- Central hall: Little Zone 4, Mộc Châu town (Note: Tiểu khu 4, thị xã Mộc Châu, tỉnh Sơn La, Việt Nam.)

Government
  - Type: Town
  - People Committee's Chairman: Lê Trọng Bình
  - Vice-Chairman: Lê Hồng Minh

Area
  - Total: 1,072.09 km^{2} (413.94 sq mi)

Population (2024)
  - Total: 148,259
  - Density: 138.290/km^{2} (358.169/sq mi)
- Time zone: UTC+7 (Indochina Time)
- ZIP code: 34700
- Website: Mocchau.Sonla.gov.vn; Mocchau.Sonla.dcs.vn

Mộc Châu [mə̰ʔwk˨˩:ʨəw˧˧] is a former district-level town of Sơn La province in the Northwest region of Vietnam.

== History ==
=== Middle Ages ===
Its name Mộc-châu in Kinh language is originated from Muaeng Mol (Mường Mỗi, "the land of barbarians") in the Black Tai language. This word is used to refer to the Xá ethnic groups, who are the ancient owners of the land. After being expelled from Mộc Châu, they transformed into Muong people.

During the Lý-Trần dynasties, the land where Mộc Châu is now the Southern part of Đà Giang province (Đà-giang đạo) of the Annamese Empire, although it was still completely independent in reality. A leader was well known in Annamese history called Trịnh Giốc Mật.

Previously, the strip of land from Mộc Châu to Mai Châu was once considered one and had no official name. Until the end of the Early Lê dynasty, or the 17th century, this area was divided into three parts : Mộc Châu belonged to Black Tai leaders (Taydam), and Mai Châu for the White Tai ones (Taykhao), in addition to a few of villages in the southernmost became the part of Xam Neua (Muang Phuan kingdom). The situation like this was almost kept until the Nguyễn dynasty completely weakened by the pressure of the French colonialists.

=== XX century ===
During the French colonial period, Mộc Châu's leadership clans were recognized by the French government in Indochina with limited autonomy within the Tai Federation. They were allowed to have their own flags and guards. Currently, the Sơn La Provincial Museum still stores some black flags with embroidered white snakes, which are symbols of the land.

In the 1952 Nasan campaign ("cassava field" in Tai language), Mộc Châu was used by Vietminh forces as a military supply center to quickly cut off the "stomach" of the French armies (CEFEO) in the Northwest region.

=== XXI century ===
On November 14, 2025, the National Assembly Standing Committee of Vietnam issued the Resolution No.1280/NQ-UBTVQH15 on the arrangement of district and commune administrative units in Sơn La province in the period of 2023-2025. Accordingly, officially establishing Mộc-châu Town on the basis of the entire natural area is 1,072.09 km2 and the population size is 148,259 people of old Mộc-châu District. Regarding affiliated administrative units, Mộc-châu Town has 15 administrative units at commune level, including 8 wards and 7 communes. On November 25, Sơn La Provincial People's Committee held a press conference and reached agreement that it would hold the Ceremony to announce the establishment of Mộc-châu Town on January 18, 2025.

== Culture ==
The name of Mộc-châu (Muaeng-mol) has been mentioned in the famous epics Táy pú xớc and Quắm tố mướng of White Tai people about 17th century.

According to an old legend, Mộc Châu is the venue that used to take place a horse race to divide the border between the Black Tai people and the Xá ethnic groups. The Tai men used a newly born horse to participate in the competition, and as a result, they won to chase the Xá people to step back to Hòa Bình province. Currently, grass horse racing is an annual festival held on every Lunar New Year.

Mộc Châu is popular with Vietnamese and international tourists for its hill tribes such as White & Black Thai People and Muong People, the green tea hills, Mộc Châu milk, the natural landscape of Dải Yếm waterfalls, Hill Pine and Orchid Garden flowers.

This town takes five hours driving, with a distance of 200 kilometres (120 mi) from Hanoi to Mộc Châu.

== Geography ==
Mộc Châu town (Thị-xã Mộc-châu) is 200 kilometers from the capital of Hanoi. As of 2019 it had a population of 114,460. The town covers an area of 1081,66 km^{2}, ranking 8th among 12 city districts of Son La Province.

Moc Chau belongs to the highland landscape class in the horizontal classification system of Vietnamese landscape, with characteristics of climate, ecology and human life.

Moc Chau is distributed on the terrain with an average elevation of more than 1,050 m above the sea level. The annual average temperature of Moc Chau is 18.7 °C, it has cool climate due to lying between the Da River (northeast) and Ma River (southwest). These two river systems act as two natural air conditioning systems. At the same time, Moc Chau has a high climate division along the belt, so it has both the characteristics of the subtropical and temperate highland climate, which is very convenient for developing tourism for the whole year.

=== Climate ===
Climate data for Mộc Châu, elevation 958 m (3,143 ft)
Month	Jan	Feb	Mar	Apr	May	Jun	Jul	Aug	Sep	Oct	Nov	Dec	Year
Record high °C (°F)	29.0 (84.2)	31.4 (88.5)	33.5 (92.3)	34.2 (93.6)	36.3 (97.3)	33.3 (91.9)	33.5 (92.3)	34.5 (94.1)	31.7 (89.1)	31.1 (88.0)	29.5 (85.1)	29.2 (84.6)	36.3 (97.3)
Mean daily maximum °C (°F)	17.2 (63.0)	19.0 (66.2)	22.8 (73.0)	26.3 (79.3)	27.7 (81.9)	27.7 (81.9)	27.6 (81.7)	27.0 (80.6)	25.8 (78.4)	23.5 (74.3)	20.8 (69.4)	18.0 (64.4)	23.6 (74.5)
Daily mean °C (°F)	12.3 (54.1)	13.8 (56.8)	17.2 (63.0)	20.6 (69.1)	22.6 (72.7)	23.3 (73.9)	23.2 (73.8)	22.7 (72.9)	21.5 (70.7)	19.2 (66.6)	16.2 (61.2)	13.1 (55.6)	18.8 (65.8)
Mean daily minimum °C (°F)	9.4 (48.9)	10.8 (51.4)	13.8 (56.8)	17.0 (62.6)	19.4 (66.9)	20.6 (69.1)	20.6 (69.1)	20.1 (68.2)	18.8 (65.8)	16.4 (61.5)	13.2 (55.8)	10.0 (50.0)	15.8 (60.4)
Record low °C (°F)	−0.9 (30.4)	0.4 (32.7)	2.2 (36.0)	7.3 (45.1)	11.4 (52.5)	13.8 (56.8)	15.2 (59.4)	15.8 (60.4)	11.7 (53.1)	8.3 (46.9)	3.3 (37.9)	−1.5 (29.3)	−1.5 (29.3)
Average rainfall mm (inches)	21.9 (0.86)	21.3 (0.84)	49.9 (1.96)	101.9 (4.01)	182.6 (7.19)	231.3 (9.11)	268.0 (10.55)	318.6 (12.54)	257.2 (10.13)	132.3 (5.21)	38.0 (1.50)	18.0 (0.71)	1,640.4 (64.58)
Average rainy days	10.9	10.9	12.5	14.9	17.9	18.3	21.0	21.1	16.3	13.3	10.1	7.9	175.5
Average relative humidity (%)	87.4	86.9	84.0	82.9	82.3	84.6	86.3	88.1	87.8	86.4	85.8	85.2	85.6
Mean monthly sunshine hours	134.4	128.2	151.3	170.6	191.0	155.5	162.3	154.9	157.1	150.4	149.0	152.6	1,851.1
Source: Vietnam Institute for Building Science and Technology

=== Landspaces ===
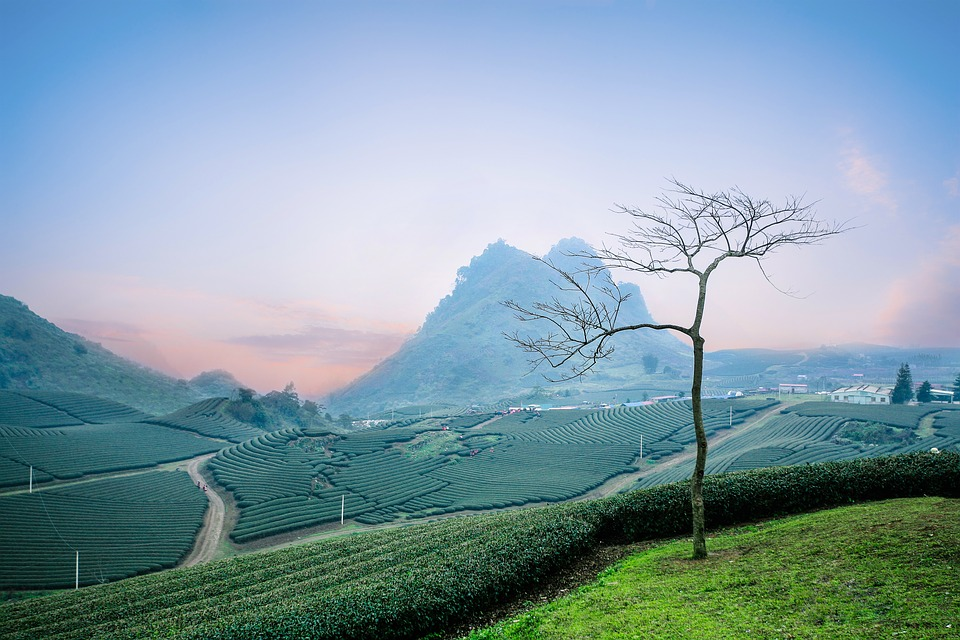

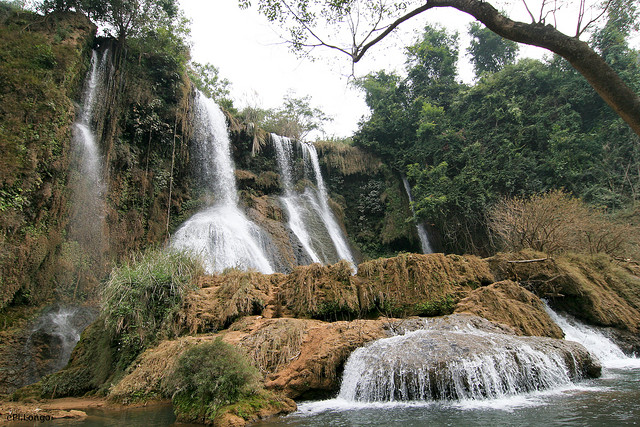

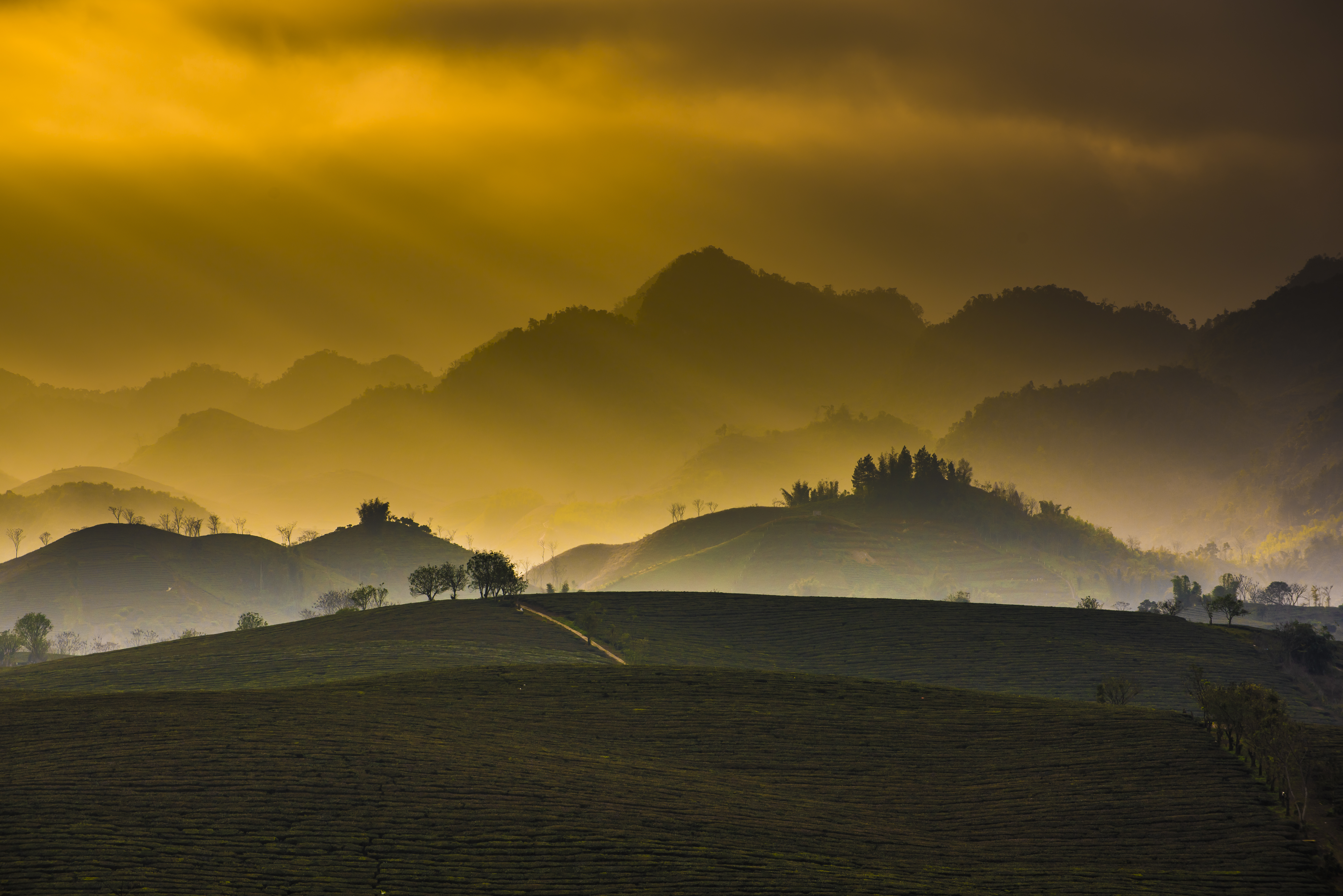

== See also ==
- Mai Châu
- Ba Vì
