= Sơn La =

Sơn La may refer to:

- Sơn La province, a province in northwestern Vietnam
- Sơn La (city), former provincial city of Sơn La province
