= Bắc Yên =

Bắc Yên Xã Bắc Yên
- Commune
- Location within Vietnam
- Coordinates: 21°14′46″N 104°26′3″E
- Country: Vietnam
- Region: Northwest
- Province: Sơn La
- Time zone: UTC+7 (UTC + 7)

Bắc Yên is a commune (xã) of Sơn La Province, Vietnam.
