= Mộc Châu =

- Ward
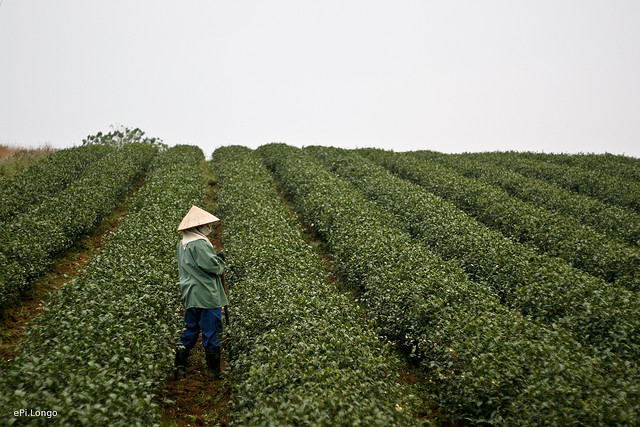
- Mộc Châu tea plantation
- Interactive map of Mộc Châu
- Coordinates: 20.86679892338647°N 104.61166890838473°E
- Country: Vietnam
- Province: Sơn La
- Region: Northwest
- Established: 16 June 2025

Area
  - Total: 167.62 km^{2} (64.72 sq mi)

Population (2025)
  - Total: 21,087
  - Density: 125/km^{2} (320/sq mi)
- Website: mocchau.sonla.gov.vn

Mộc Châu is a ward in Sơn La province, Vietnam.

On 16 June 2025:

- The National Assembly of Vietnam adopted Resolution No. 203/2025/QH15 amending and supplementing several articles of the Constitution of the Socialist Republic of Vietnam. The resolution provided for the cessation of district-level administrative units nationwide from 1 July 2025.
- The Standing Committee of the National Assembly of Vietnam adopted Resolution No. 1681/NQ-UBTVQH15 on the reorganization of commune-level administrative units in Sơn La province in 2025. Under the resolution, the entire natural area and population of Mộc Lỵ and Mường Sang wards and Chiềng Hắc commune were consolidated to form a new ward named Mộc Châu.
