= List of administrative divisions of Vietnam by Human Development Index =

This is a list of regions and administrative divisions of Vietnam by Human Development Index as of 2023.

== Regions ==
Regions of Vietnam by HDI (2019) 0.737 to 0.748 0.706 to 0.736 0.667 to 0.705 0.655 to 0.666

This is a list of the Regions of Vietnam by Human Development Index as of 2025 with data for the year 2023.

Rank	Region	HDI (2023)
Very High Human Development
1	Red River Delta	0.810
High human development
2	Southeast	0.778
3	North Central Coast, South Central Coast	0.774
—	Vietnam	0.766
4	Northeast, Northwest	0.724
5	Mekong River Delta	0.724
6	Central Highlands	0.723

== Divisions ==
This is a list of the first-level administrative divisions of Vietnam by Human Development Index as of 2023. In this table, (M) denotes municipalities.

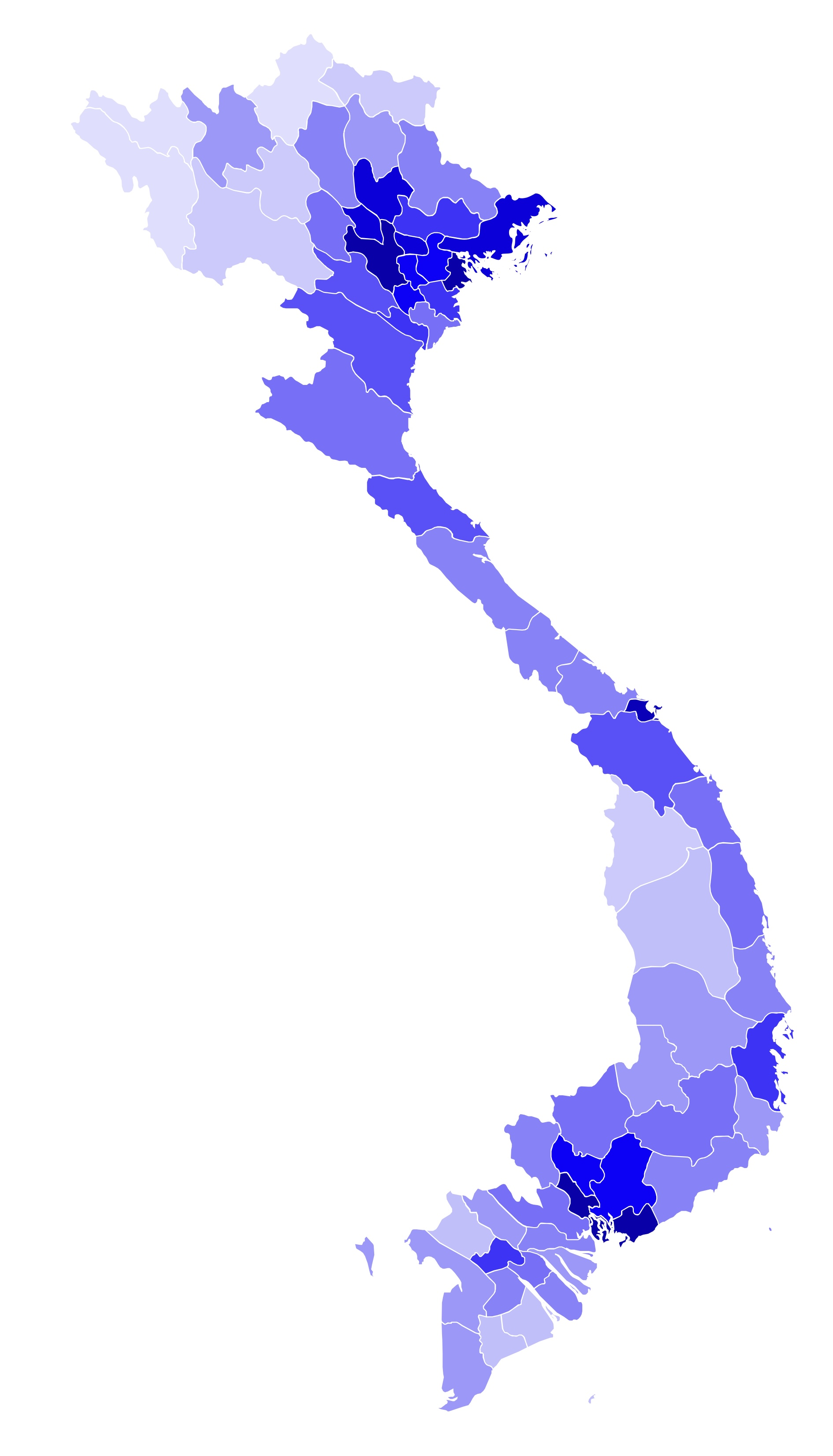
Administrative divisions of Vietnam by Human Development Index. ≥0.805 0.790–0.804 0.770–0.789 0.755–0.769 0.735–0.754 0.720–0.734 0.705–0.719 0.690–0.704 0.675–0.689 0.660–0.674 0.645–0.659 ≤0.645

Rank	Province, or municipality	HDI
Very high human development
1	Hà Nội (M)	0.845
2	Hồ Chí Minh City (M)	0.829
3	Quảng Ninh (M)	0.814
4	Hải Phòng (M)	0.805
High human development
5	Đà Nẵng (M)	0.781
6	Đồng Nai (M)	0.777
7	Bắc Ninh (M)	0.774
8	Thái Nguyên	0.772
9	Hưng Yên	0.770
–	Vietnam (average)	0.766
10	Phú Thọ	0.762
11	Hà Tĩnh	0.750
12	Thanh Hóa	0.747
13	Ninh Bình	0.746
14	Khánh Hòa	0.743
15	Tây Ninh	0.735
16	Huế (M)	0.734
17	Nghệ An	0.733
18	Cần Thơ (M)	0.730
19	Lâm Đồng	0.726
19	Quảng Trị	0.726
21	Quảng Ngãi	0.721
22	Vĩnh Long	0.719
23	Đồng Tháp	0.716
24	Đắk Lắk	0.712
25	Gia Lai	0.711
26	Cà Mau	0.709
26	Lạng Sơn	0.709
28	Lào Cai	0.700
Medium human development
29	An Giang	0.699
30	Cao Bằng	0.684
31	Sơn La	0.678
32	Tuyên Quang	0.677
33	Điện Biên	0.656
34	Lai Châu	0.621

== See also ==
- List of countries by Human Development Index
