= Thuận Châu =

Thuận Châu Xã Thuận Châu
- Commune
- Thuận Châu commune
- Location within Vietnam
- Coordinates: 21°26′03″N 103°41′35″E
- Country: Vietnam
- Region: Northwest
- Province: Sơn La
- Time zone: UTC+7 (UTC + 7)

Thuận Châu is a commune (xã) of Sơn La Province, Vietnam.
