= Sông Mã Range =

Mountains in Vietnam

Song Ma Range (Vietnamese: Dãy núi Sông Mã) is a mountain range in Northwest Vietnam. It extends approximately 500 km along the border between Laos and Vietnam. Some high points of the range are above 1,800 m. The range is named after the Ma River (sông Mã).
