= Lai Châu =

Lai Châu may refer to:

- Lai Châu province, a province in mountainous northern Vietnam
- Lai Châu (city), former provincial city of Lai Châu province
