= Phù Yên district =

Coordinates: 21°15′34″N 104°39′17″E

Phù Yên district Huyện Phù Yên
- District
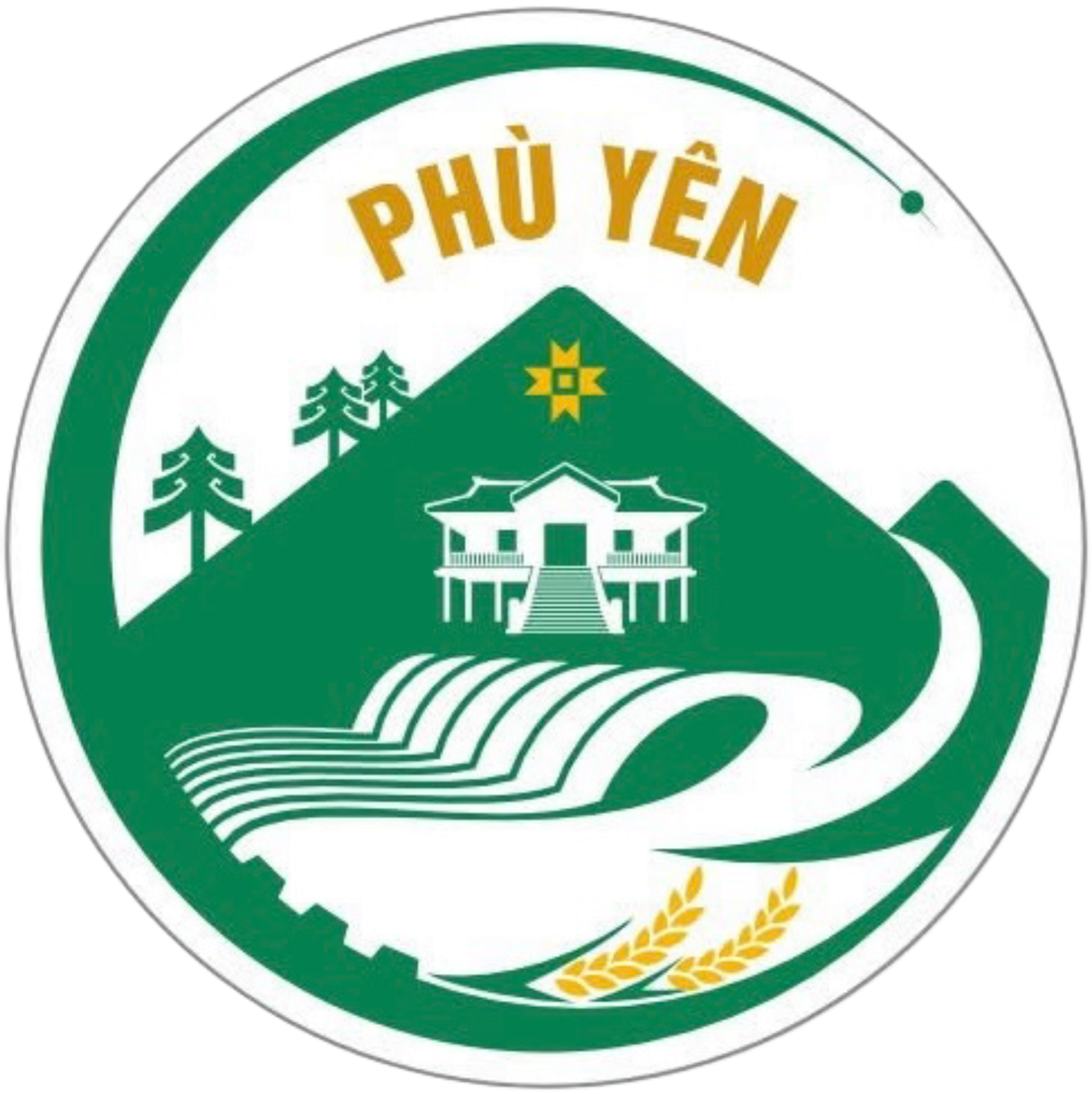
- Seal
- Interactive map of Phù Yên district
- Country: Vietnam
- Region: Northwest
- Province: Sơn La
- Capital: Phù Yên

Area
  - Total: 1,227 km^{2} (474 sq mi)

Population (2019)
  - Total: 114,974
  - Density: 93.70/km^{2} (242.7/sq mi)
- Time zone: UTC+7 (UTC + 7)
- Website: phuyen.sonla.gov.vn

Phù Yên is a former rural district of Sơn La province in the Northwest region of Vietnam. As of 2019, the district had a population of 114,974. The district covers an area of 1,227 km^{2}. The district capital lies at Phù Yên.

== Administrative divisions ==
Phù Yên is divided into 27 commune-level sub-divisions, including the township of Phù Yên and 26 rural communes (Bắc Phong, Đá Đỏ, Gia Phù, Huy Bắc, Huy Hạ, Huy Tân, Huy Thượng, Huy Tường, Kim Bon, Mường Bang, Mường Cơi, Mường Do, Mường Lang, Mường Thải, Nam Phong, Quang Huy, Sập Xa, Suối Bau, Suối Tọ, Tân Lang, Tân Phong, Tường Hạ, Tường Phong, Tường Phù, Tường Thượng, Tường Tiến).

Places of Interest The surrounding mountains are populated by H'mong families. One site of interest is the beautiful Suoi Chieu Lake a few kilometers north of the town.

== Climate ==
Climate data for Phù Yên
Month	Jan	Feb	Mar	Apr	May	Jun	Jul	Aug	Sep	Oct	Nov	Dec	Year
Record high °C (°F)	35.5 (95.9)	37.2 (99.0)	39.9 (103.8)	41.0 (105.8)	41.8 (107.2)	39.7 (103.5)	39.3 (102.7)	38.3 (100.9)	36.7 (98.1)	36.8 (98.2)	35.3 (95.5)	35.2 (95.4)	41.8 (107.2)
Mean daily maximum °C (°F)	21.0 (69.8)	22.8 (73.0)	26.1 (79.0)	30.2 (86.4)	32.9 (91.2)	33.4 (92.1)	33.4 (92.1)	32.7 (90.9)	31.6 (88.9)	29.2 (84.6)	26.2 (79.2)	22.9 (73.2)	28.6 (83.5)
Daily mean °C (°F)	16.3 (61.3)	18.0 (64.4)	21.1 (70.0)	24.6 (76.3)	27.1 (80.8)	28.2 (82.8)	28.1 (82.6)	27.4 (81.3)	26.2 (79.2)	23.9 (75.0)	20.6 (69.1)	17.2 (63.0)	23.2 (73.8)
Mean daily minimum °C (°F)	13.5 (56.3)	15.2 (59.4)	18.1 (64.6)	21.2 (70.2)	23.4 (74.1)	24.8 (76.6)	24.8 (76.6)	24.3 (75.7)	23.1 (73.6)	20.7 (69.3)	17.2 (63.0)	13.8 (56.8)	20.0 (68.0)
Record low °C (°F)	0.5 (32.9)	3.0 (37.4)	4.3 (39.7)	10.3 (50.5)	15.7 (60.3)	16.2 (61.2)	19.6 (67.3)	—	14.7 (58.5)	8.9 (48.0)	3.4 (38.1)	−0.9 (30.4)	−0.9 (30.4)
Average rainfall mm (inches)	25.2 (0.99)	24.8 (0.98)	40.3 (1.59)	110.9 (4.37)	194.2 (7.65)	224.5 (8.84)	245.6 (9.67)	274.1 (10.79)	203.9 (8.03)	110.9 (4.37)	35.5 (1.40)	17.9 (0.70)	1,507.2 (59.34)
Average rainy days	5.5	5.1	6.7	12.4	15.4	15.8	17.7	18.5	13.5	10.4	6.2	4.3	131.6
Average relative humidity (%)	80.5	79.5	78.8	79.5	78.8	79.5	81.1	83.5	83.6	82.2	80.8	79.8	80.5
Mean monthly sunshine hours	96.0	94.9	120.3	154.5	194.2	160.4	171.7	171.3	164.9	148.4	133.3	140.4	1,755.8
Source: Vietnam Institute for Building Science and Technology
