= Sơn La province =

Province of Vietnam

Sơn La
- Province
- Tỉnh Sơn La
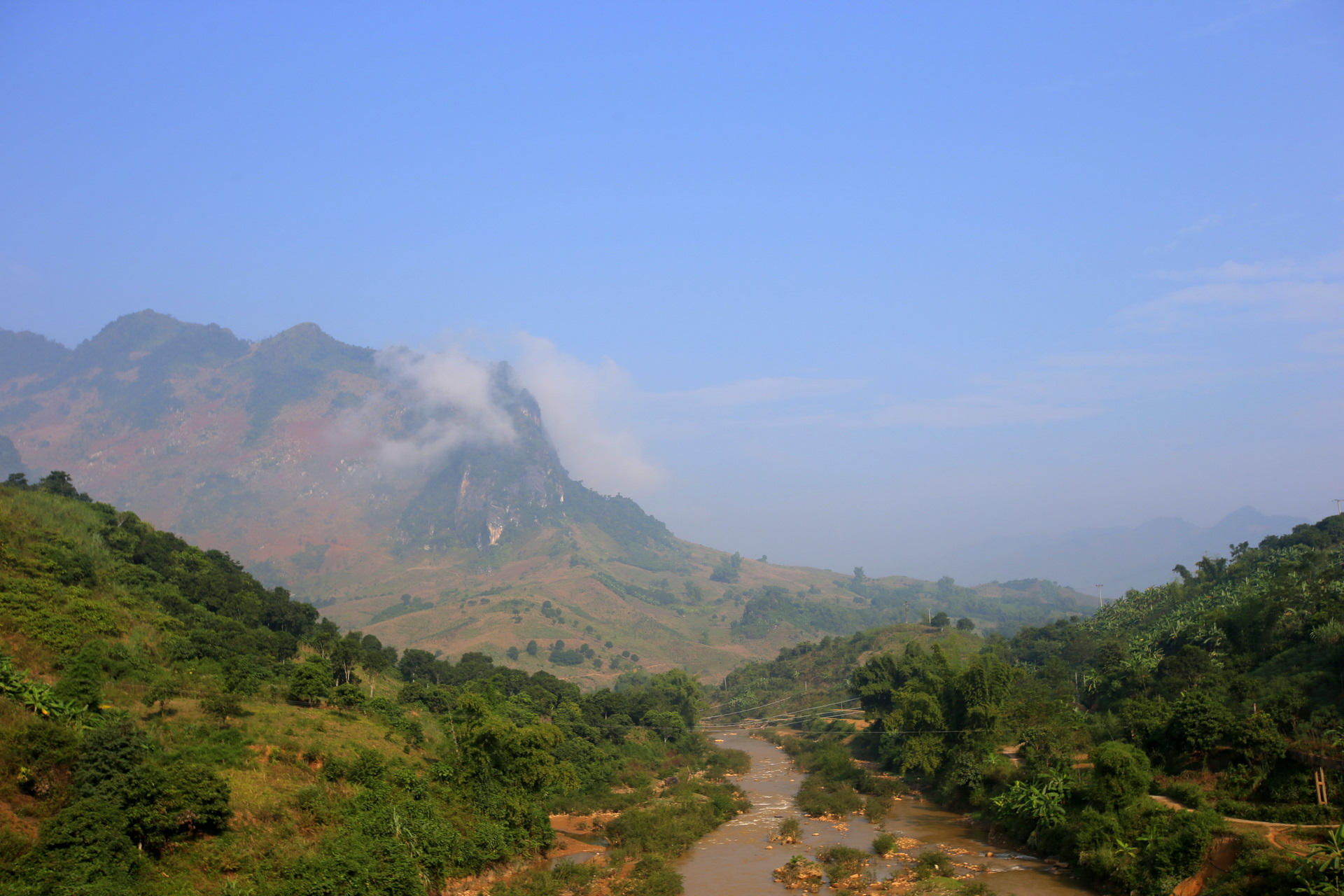
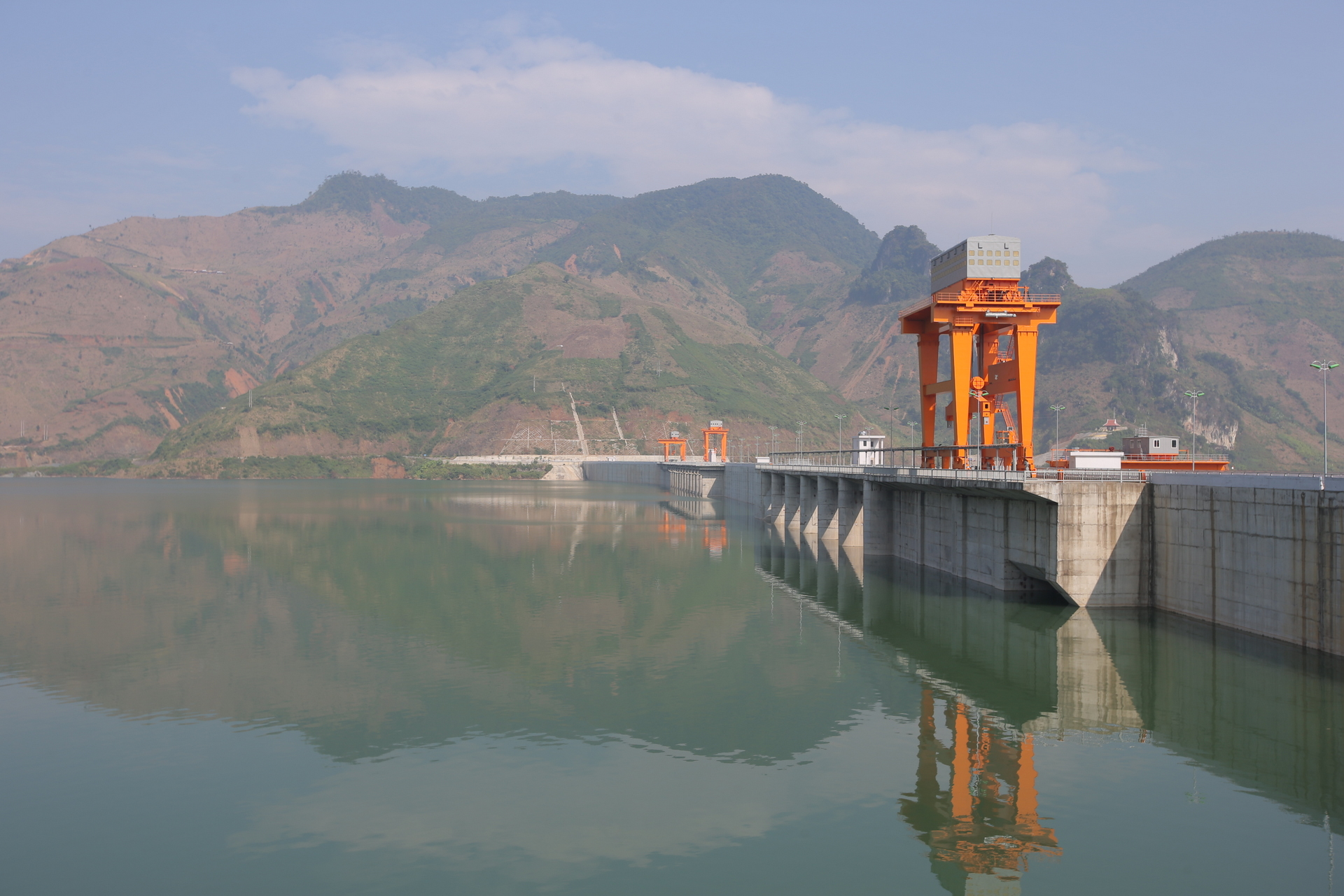
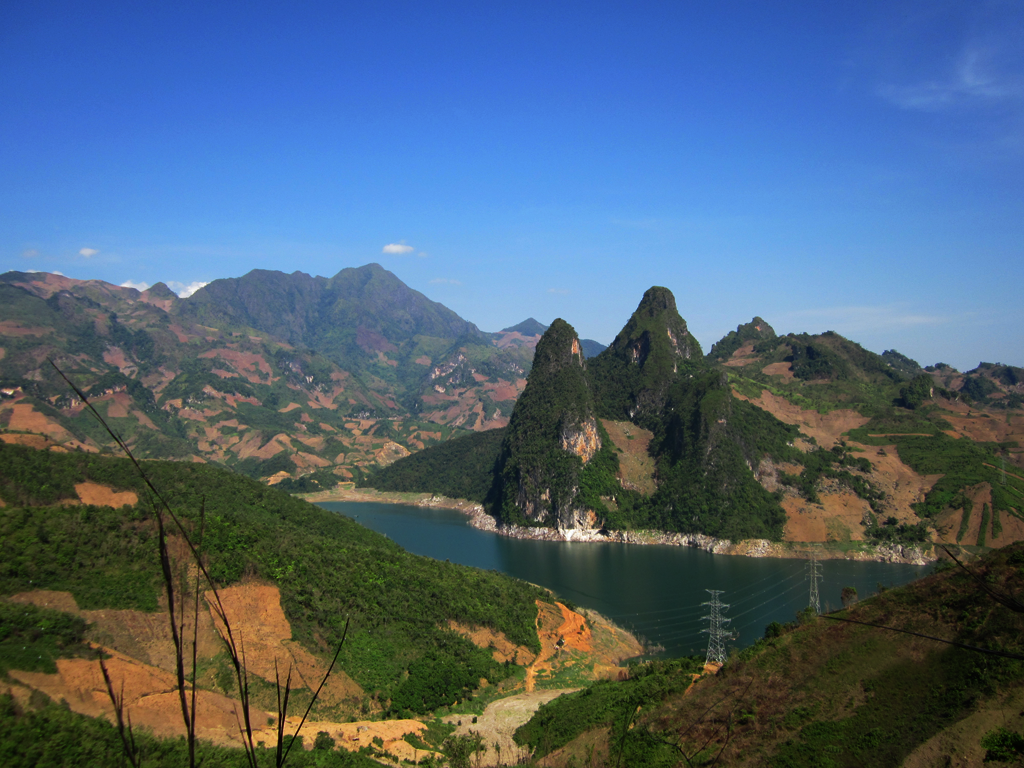
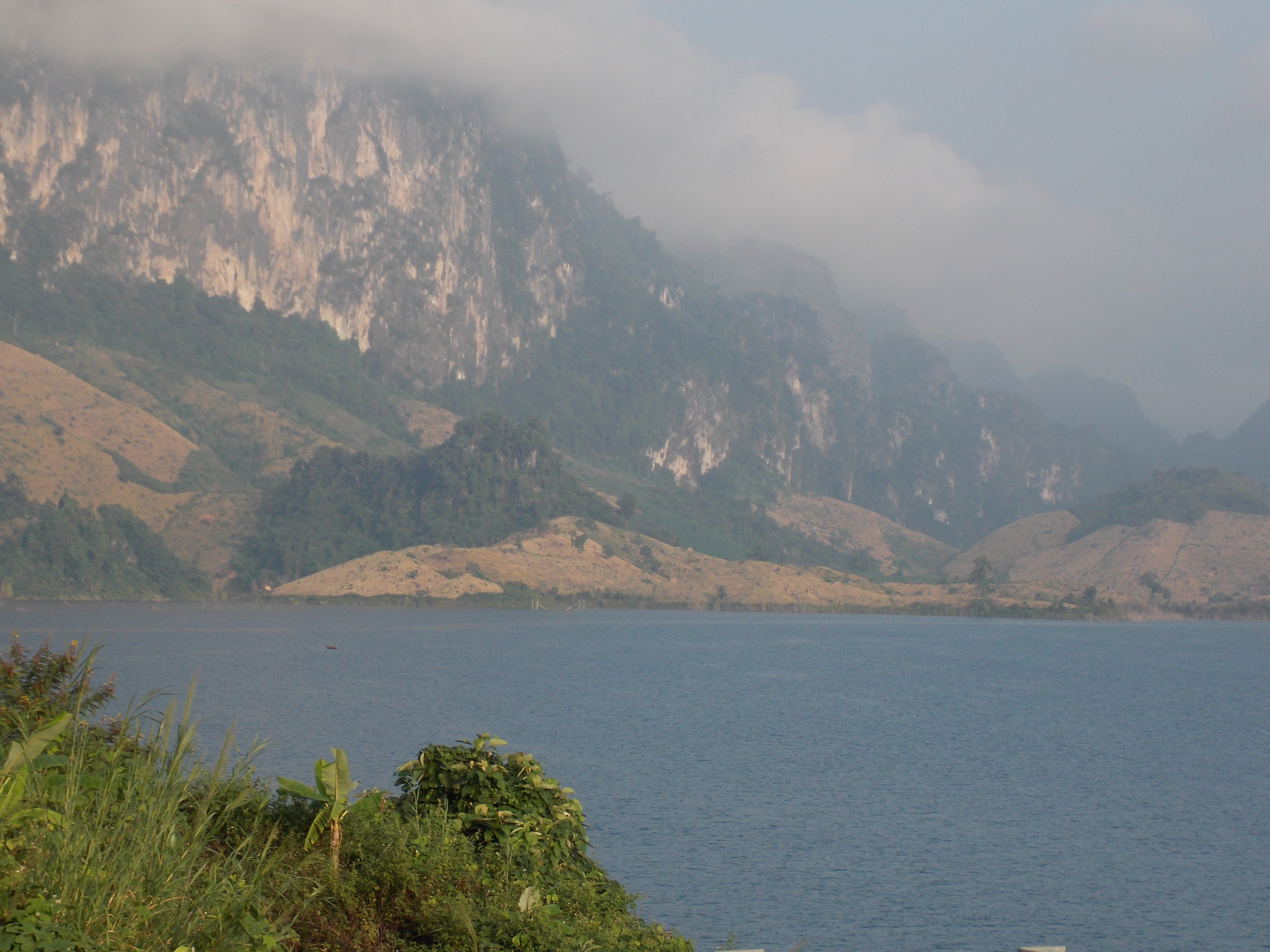
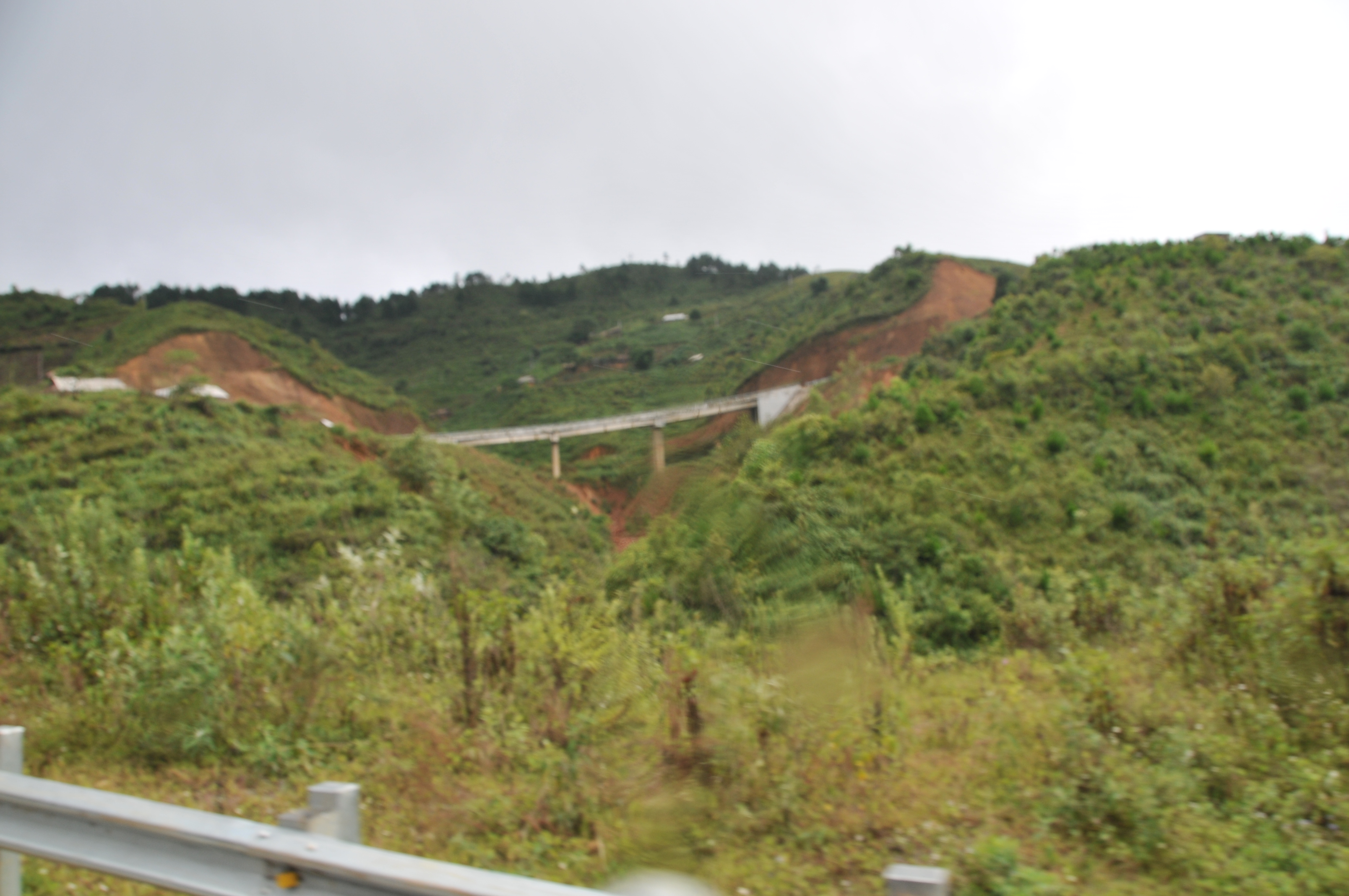
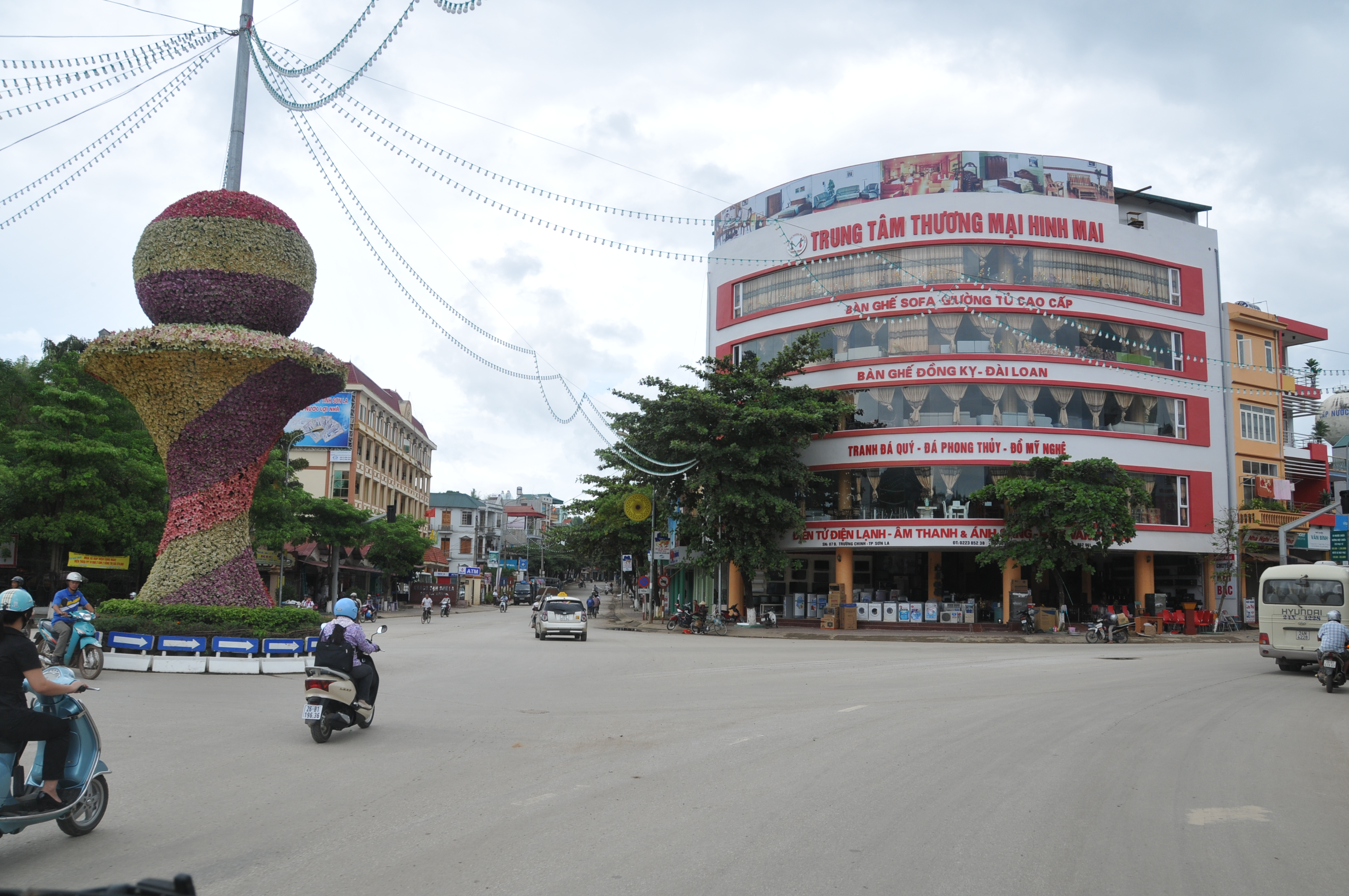
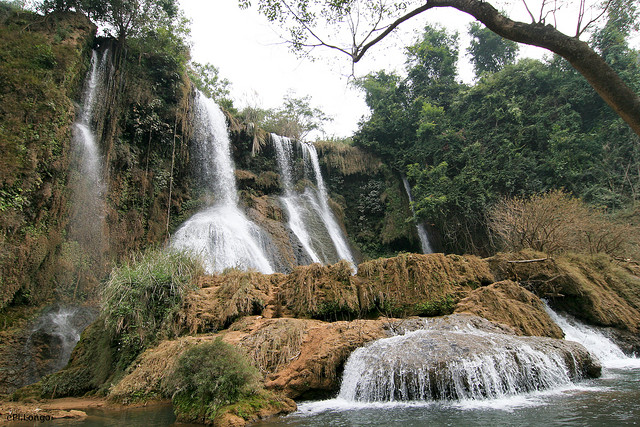
- Mường La mountain • Sơn La dam • Mộc Châu mountain • Quỳnh Nhai mountain pass • Pha Đin mountain pass • Tô Hiệu ward • Dải Yếm waterfall

- Seal

- Interactive map of Sơn La
- Coordinates: 21°10′N 104°0′E
- Country: Vietnam
- Region: Northern Midland and Mountainous
- Capital: Chiềng Cơi ward
- Subdivisions: 8 wards, 67 communes

Government
  - Type: Province
  - Body: Sơn La Provincial People's Council
  - Chairman of People's Council: Lò Minh Hùng
  - Chairman of People's Committee: Nguyễn Đình Việt

Area
  - Total: 14,108.89 km^{2} (5,447.47 sq mi)

Population (2025)
  - Total: 1,404,587
  - Density: 99.55333/km^{2} (257.8419/sq mi)

Ethnic groups
  - Tai: 53.61%
  - Kinh: 16.26%
  - Hmoob: 16.06%
  - Muong: 6.78%
  - Ksingmul: 2.17%
  - Others: 5.12%

GDP
  - Province: 96.020 billion VND (3.64 billion USD)
- Time zone: UTC+7 (ICT)
- Area codes: 212
- ISO 3166 code: VN-05
- HDI (2020): ▲0.646 (27th)
- Website: sonla.gov.vn

Sơn La is a province in the Northern Midland and Mountainous region of Vietnam. The province shares a 274km border with Lao People’s Democratic Republic. The province's topography is mainly characterized by high hills, plateaus, and interspersed valleys. It holds a strategically important position in terms of transportation and national defense in northwestern Vietnam. Sơn La is divided into 75 administrative units, including 8 wards and 67 communes. The administrative center is Chiềng Cơi ward.

In 2018, Sơn La ranked 31st among Vietnam's administrative units in terms of population, 40th in Gross Regional Domestic Product (GRDP), 49th in GRDP per capita, and 63rd in GRDP growth rate. With a population of 1,242,700 people, its GRDP reached 47.223 trillion VND (approximately 2.0509 billion USD), GRDP per capita was 38 million VND (around 1,650 USD), and the GRDP growth rate was 5.59%. Sơn La is the largest province by area in Northern Vietnam. Sơn La Dam was the largest hydroelectric power station in Southeast Asia.

== History ==
During the Lý dynasty (in the 11th–12th centuries), the central area of present-day Sơn La province was the settlement territory of a kingdom recorded in the Đại Việt sử ký toàn thư under the name Ngưu Hống.

On August 23, 1904, Sơn La province was established, capital of province is Sơn La town. In 1907, Resident Monpeyrat ordered the construction of Sơn La Prison. In 1917, the French Resident Laumet opened schools teaching Quốc Ngữ and French.

After 1946, Sơn La province, together with Lai Châu and Phong Thổ provinces (established by the French), formed the “Tai Autonomous Territory” under French direction. Bạc Cầm Quý served as Provincial chief of Sơn La from 1948 to 1953, and the province was part of the Việt Bắc Interzone. At that time, Sơn La province had six districts: Mường La, Thuận Châu, Phù Yên, Mai Sơn, Yên Châu and Mộc Châu.

From 1953 to 1955, Sơn La belonged to the Northwest zone. From 1955 to 1962, all provinces belonging to the Thái Mèo Autonomous region were abolished. From 1962 to 1975, Sơn La province was re-established and belonged to the Tây Bắc Autonomous region (renamed from the Thái Mèo Autonomous region).

At that time, the province had seven districts, with Quỳnh Nhai and Sông Mã added, while Phù Yên district was transferred to the newly established Nghĩa Lộ province.

On 20 September 1975, the Politburo issued Resolution No. 245-NQ/TW on:

- The merger of Sơn La province with Bắc Yên and Phù Yên districts of Nghĩa Lộ province into a single province, with the name of the new province and the location of its provincial capital to be proposed by the local authorities.
- The merger of Lào Cai province, Nghĩa Lộ province (except Bắc Yên and Phù Yên districts), and Yên Bái province.

On 27 December 1975, the National Assembly issued a resolution on:

- The establishment of Hoàng Liên Sơn province through the merger of Lào Cai province, Nghĩa Lộ province (except Bắc Yên and Phù Yên districts), and Yên Bái province.
- The incorporation of Bắc Yên and Phù Yên districts of Nghĩa Lộ Province into Sơn La Province.

By the end of 1975, Sơn La province consisted of Sơn La district-level town (capital) and seven districts: Mai Sơn, Mộc Châu, Mường La, Quỳnh Nhai, Sông Mã, Thuận Châu, and Yên Châu.

After the dissolution of the Tây Bắc Autonomous region, Sơn La province incorporated two additional districts from the recently dissolved Nghĩa Lộ province: Phù Yên and Bắc Yên. Sơn La province then consisted of Sơn La district-level town (capital) and nine districts: Bắc Yên, Mai Sơn, Mộc Châu, Mường La, Phù Yên, Quỳnh Nhai, Sông Mã, Thuận Châu and Yên Châu.

On 2 December 2003, Sông Mã district was divided into two districts: Sông Mã and Sốp Cộp.

On 3 September 2008, Sơn La district-level town was converted into Sơn La provincial city.

On 10 June 2013, Mộc Châu district was divided into two districts: Mộc Châu and Vân Hồ.

On 1 February 2025, Mộc Châu district-level town was established on the basis of the entire area and population of the former Mộc Châu district.

Sơn La province then consisted of Sơn La provincial city (capital), Mộc Châu town, and 10 districts: Bắc Yên, Mai Sơn, Mường La, Phù Yên, Quỳnh Nhai, Sông Mã, Sốp Cộp, Thuận Châu, Vân Hồ, and Yên Châu.

On 12 June 2025, the National Assembly of Vietnam promulgated Resolution No. 202/2025/QH15. Accordingly, Sơn La province was not merged with any other province.

On 16 June 2025, the National Assembly of Vietnam promulgated Resolution No. 203/2025/QH15 amending and supplementing several articles of the Constitution of the Socialist Republic of Vietnam. Accordingly, district-level administrative units nationwide ceased to operate from 1 July 2025.

On 16 June 2025, the Standing Committee of the National Assembly of Vietnam promulgated Resolution No. 1681/NQ-UBTVQH15 on the arrangement of commune-level administrative units in Sơn La province in 2025 (effective from 16 June 2025). Sơn La province has 75 administrative units, comprising 8 wards and 67 communes.

== Administrative divisions ==
Sơn La province is divided into 75 commune-level subdivisions, including 8 wards and 67 communes:

Administrative divisions of Sơn La

Name	Area (km²)	Population (people)
Wards (8)
Chiềng An	149.08	20,322
Chiềng Cơi	93.56	22,694
Chiềng Sinh	68.40	27,099
Mộc Châu	167.62	21,087
Mộc Sơn	37.88	15,025
Thảo Nguyên	53.09	22,479
Tô Hiệu	11.92	51,293
Vân Sơn	39.61	15,917
Communes (67)
Bắc Yên	195.23	21,825
Bình Thuận	121.78	17,128
Bó Sinh	153.83	16,461
Chiềng Hặc	239.91	18,721
Chiềng Hoa	296.48	17,644
Chiềng Khoong	253.87	23,222
Chiềng Khương	149.82	18,712
Chiềng La	126.13	20,373
Chiềng Lao	358.55	21,010
Chiềng Mai	151.85	23,786

Name	Area (km²)	Population (people)
Chiềng Mung	142.14	27,797
Chiềng Sại	124.55	6,720
Chiềng Sơ	140.31	17,145
Chiềng Sơn	204.90	14,155
Chiềng Sung	109.28	14,171
Co Mạ	214.28	14,560
Đoàn Kết	240.66	17,938
Gia Phù	111.32	21,929
Huổi Một	240.66	12,349
Kim Bon	104.51	9,873
Long Hẹ	158.40	8,473
Lóng Phiêng	147.81	11,152
Lóng Sập	211.30	9,629
Mai Sơn	164.40	52,361
Muổi Nọi	128.70	15,633
Mường Bám	76.16	10,731
Mường Bang	270.15	12,831
Mường Bú	213.65	25,284
Mường Chanh	101.47	11,275
Mường Chiên	382.20	14,028

Name	Area (km²)	Population (people)
Mường Cơi	194.98	19,557
Mường É	139.91	14,858
Mường Giôn	290.54	16,145
Mường Hung	226.09	24,613
Mường Khiêng	204.20	24,570
Mường La	341.86	32,712
Mường Lạn	264.89	10,901
Mường Lầm	167.10	15,647
Mường Lèo	375.76	4,277
Mường Sại	122.94	9,557
Nậm Lầu	247.63	18,095
Nậm Ty	201.89	16,679
Ngọc Chiến	212.19	12,021
Pắc Ngà	122.59	13,274
Phiêng Cằm	280.33	14,459
Phiêng Khoài	103.77	12,424
Phiêng Pằn	320.65	24,685
Phù Yên	117.98	47,299
Púng Bánh	364.64	17,264
Quỳnh Nhai	244.31	30,554

Name	Area (km²)	Population (people)
Song Khủa	192.45	15,845
Sông Mã	105.99	26,179
Sốp Cộp	466.95	24,086
Suối Tọ	177.49	6,343
Tà Hộc	149.56	13,692
Tạ Khoa	191.88	15,522
Tà Xùa	233.67	11,199
Tân Phong	135.45	6,787
Tân Yên	192.79	18,380
Thuận Châu	132.83	46,958
Tô Múa	181.98	14,701
Tường Hạ	120.85	14,076
Vân Hồ	268.40	24,998
Xím Vàng	232.35	7,596
Xuân Nha	263.37	10,127
Yên Châu	246.55	33,061
Yên Sơn	116.62	12,614
