= Muang Then =

- c. 8th century – 1067?
- Common languages: Black Tai
- Religion: Theravada Buddhism, Mahayana Buddhism, Tai folk religion
- Government: Monarchy
  - c. 8th century: Khun Borom
- History
  - Establishment: c. 8th century
  - Known as Ngưu Hống: 1067
Preceded by	Succeeded by
Nanzhao	Ngưu Hống

Muang Thaeng or Mường Thèn is a legendary Tai locality believed to be associated with modern-day Mường Thanh Valley in Điện Biên province of Vietnam.

In legend, it is the initial settlement of Tai people migrating southward from Yunnan around the time of the Kingdom of Nanzhao under their leader Khun Borom, who is associated with Piluoge (ruler of Nanzhao from 728 to 748).
