= Sông Mã district =

Sông Mã District Huyện Sông Mã
- District
- Interactive map of Sông Mã District
- Country: Vietnam
- Region: Northwest
- Province: Sơn La
- Capital: Sông Mã
- Subdivision: one township and 18 rural communes

Government
  - Type: District

Area
  - Total: 1,658 km^{2} (640 sq mi)

Population (2019)
  - Total: 154,224
  - Density: 93.02/km^{2} (240.9/sq mi)
- Time zone: UTC+7 (ICT)
- Website: songma.sonla.gov.vn

Sông Mã is a former rural district of Sơn La province in northwest Vietnam. As of 2019, the district had a population of 154,224. The district covers an area of 1,658 km^{2}. Sông Mã is the district capital.

== Administrative divisions ==
Sông Mã is divided into 19 commune-level sub-divisions, including the township of Sông Mã and 18 rural communes (Bó Sinh, Chiềng Cang, Chiềng En, Chiềng Khoong, Chiềng Khương, Chiềng Phung, Chiềng Sơ, Đứa Mòn, Huổi Một, Mường Cai, Mường Hung, Mường Lầm, Mường Sai, Nà Nghịu, Nậm Mằn, Nậm Ty, Pú Bẩu, Yên Hưng).

== Climate ==
Climate data for Sông Mã, elevation 302 m (991 ft)
| Month | Jan | Feb | Mar | Apr | May | Jun | Jul | Aug | Sep | Oct | Nov | Dec | Year |
|---|---|---|---|---|---|---|---|---|---|---|---|---|---|
| Record high °C (°F) | 34.4 (93.9) | 37.8 (100.0) | 38.9 (102.0) | 42.0 (107.6) | 42.1 (107.8) | 39.3 (102.7) | 39.2 (102.6) | 37.5 (99.5) | 38.7 (101.7) | 38.8 (101.8) | 36.0 (96.8) | 33.5 (92.3) | 42.1 (107.8) |
| Mean daily maximum °C (°F) | 23.9 (75.0) | 26.5 (79.7) | 29.8 (85.6) | 32.5 (90.5) | 33.3 (91.9) | 32.3 (90.1) | 31.6 (88.9) | 31.6 (88.9) | 31.5 (88.7) | 29.7 (85.5) | 27.0 (80.6) | 24.2 (75.6) | 29.5 (85.1) |
| Daily mean °C (°F) | 16.8 (62.2) | 18.6 (65.5) | 21.7 (71.1) | 24.8 (76.6) | 26.4 (79.5) | 26.6 (79.9) | 26.3 (79.3) | 26.0 (78.8) | 25.3 (77.5) | 23.2 (73.8) | 19.9 (67.8) | 16.8 (62.2) | 22.7 (72.9) |
| Mean daily minimum °C (°F) | 12.5 (54.5) | 13.7 (56.7) | 16.3 (61.3) | 19.5 (67.1) | 21.9 (71.4) | 23.2 (73.8) | 23.2 (73.8) | 22.9 (73.2) | 21.8 (71.2) | 19.5 (67.1) | 16.0 (60.8) | 12.7 (54.9) | 18.6 (65.5) |
| Record low °C (°F) | −0.8 (30.6) | 2.9 (37.2) | 5.7 (42.3) | 9.8 (49.6) | 15.3 (59.5) | — | 18.6 (65.5) | 19.7 (67.5) | 14.6 (58.3) | 8.4 (47.1) | 4.4 (39.9) | 0.3 (32.5) | −0.8 (30.6) |
| Average rainfall mm (inches) | 18.1 (0.71) | 16.5 (0.65) | 37.9 (1.49) | 100.5 (3.96) | 147.2 (5.80) | 199.3 (7.85) | 225.6 (8.88) | 229.6 (9.04) | 115.9 (4.56) | 39.0 (1.54) | 25.1 (0.99) | 14.6 (0.57) | 1,169.2 (46.03) |
| Average rainy days | 3.5 | 3.1 | 5.8 | 11.2 | 15.4 | 18.1 | 20.0 | 19.4 | 11.9 | 7.2 | 4.1 | 2.5 | 122.2 |
| Average relative humidity (%) | 79.5 | 76.4 | 74.3 | 75.5 | 78.8 | 83.8 | 86.1 | 86.4 | 84.7 | 83.2 | 81.8 | 80.9 | 81.0 |
| Mean monthly sunshine hours | 138.2 | 146.4 | 172.5 | 188.5 | 199.8 | 146.2 | 142.7 | 151.1 | 169.4 | 159.5 | 148.6 | 148.6 | 1,908.1 |
Source: Vietnam Institute for Building Science and Technology
