= Mai Sơn district =

Mai Sơn District Huyện Mai Sơn
- District
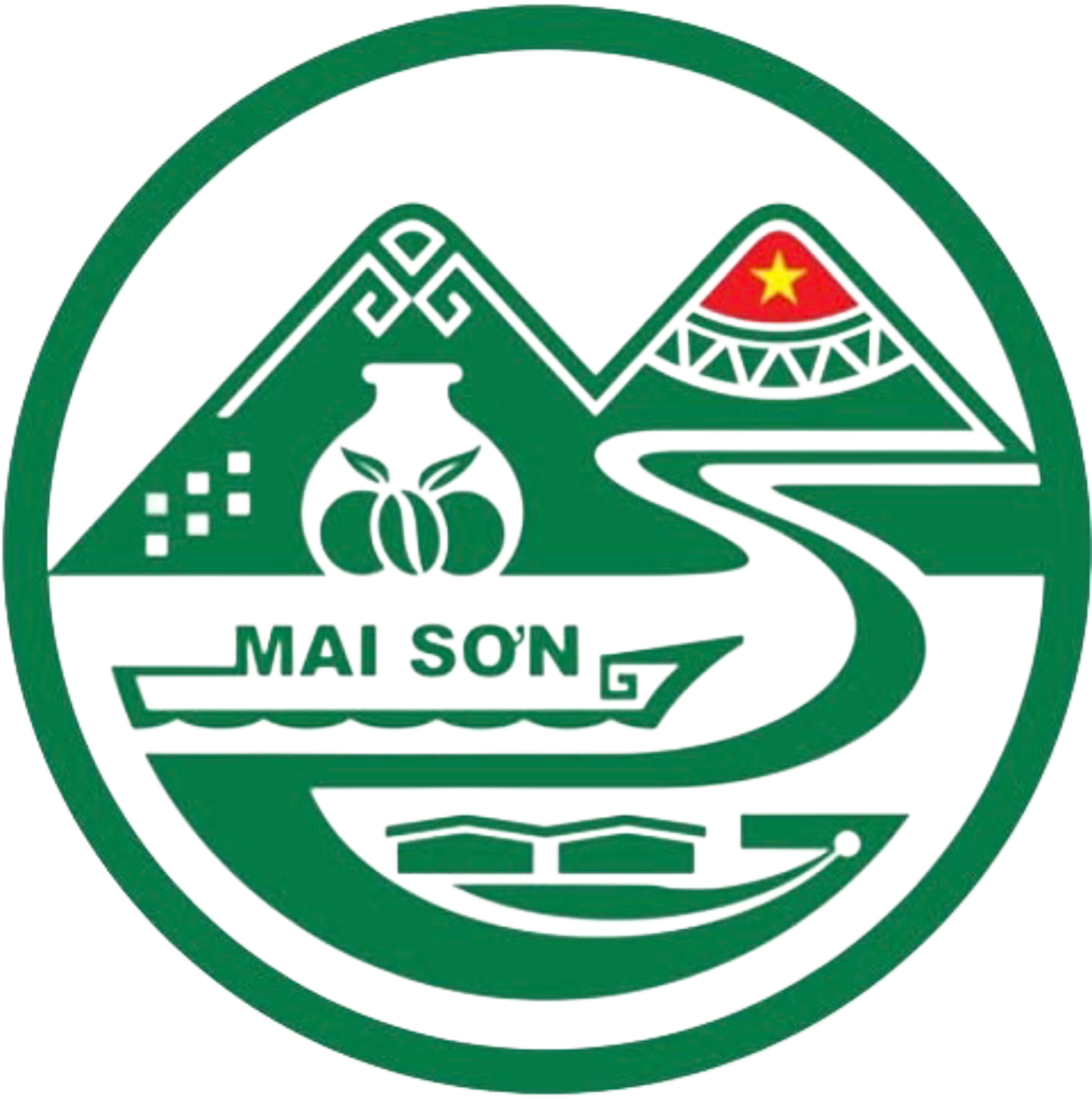
- Seal
- Interactive map of Mai Sơn District
- Coordinates: 21°11′56″N 104°6′0″E
- Country: Vietnam
- Region: Northwest
- Province: Sơn La
- Capital: Hát Lót
- Subdivision: one township and 21 rural communes

Government
  - Type: District

Area
  - Total: 1,410 km^{2} (540 sq mi)

Population (2019)
  - Total: 163,881
  - Density: 116/km^{2} (301/sq mi)
- Time zone: UTC+7 (UTC + 7)
- Website: maison.sonla.gov.vn

Mai Sơn is a former rural district of Sơn La province in the Northwest region of Vietnam. As of 2019, the district had a population of 163,881. The district covers an area of 1,410 km^{2}. The district capital lies at Hát Lót.

== Administrative divisions ==
Mai Sơn is divided into 22 commune-level sub-divisions, including the township of Hát Lót and 21 rural communes (Chiềng Ban, Chiềng Chăn, Chiềng Chung, Chiềng Dong, Chiềng Kheo, Chiềng Lương, Chiềng Mai, Chiềng Mung, Chiềng Nơi, Chiềng Sung, Chiềng Ve, Cò Nòi, Hát Lót, Mường Bằng, Mường Bon, Mường Chanh, Nà Bó, Nà Ớt, Phiêng Cằm, Phiêng Pằn, Tà Hộc).

== Climate ==
Climate data for Cò Nòi, Mai Sơn District, elevation 704 m (2,310 ft)
Month	Jan	Feb	Mar	Apr	May	Jun	Jul	Aug	Sep	Oct	Nov	Dec	Year
Record high °C (°F)	31.8 (89.2)	34.4 (93.9)	36.4 (97.5)	37.9 (100.2)	38.0 (100.4)	36.8 (98.2)	35.6 (96.1)	35.5 (95.9)	34.0 (93.2)	35.7 (96.3)	32.0 (89.6)	31.4 (88.5)	38.0 (100.4)
Mean daily maximum °C (°F)	20.7 (69.3)	23.2 (73.8)	26.9 (80.4)	29.8 (85.6)	30.5 (86.9)	30.0 (86.0)	29.6 (85.3)	29.4 (84.9)	28.7 (83.7)	26.7 (80.1)	24.0 (75.2)	21.2 (70.2)	26.7 (80.1)
Daily mean °C (°F)	14.6 (58.3)	16.6 (61.9)	20.1 (68.2)	23.2 (73.8)	24.7 (76.5)	25.1 (77.2)	24.9 (76.8)	24.5 (76.1)	23.6 (74.5)	21.4 (70.5)	18.1 (64.6)	14.9 (58.8)	21.0 (69.8)
Mean daily minimum °C (°F)	10.6 (51.1)	12.4 (54.3)	15.6 (60.1)	18.8 (65.8)	20.8 (69.4)	22.0 (71.6)	21.9 (71.4)	21.5 (70.7)	20.1 (68.2)	17.6 (63.7)	14.0 (57.2)	10.5 (50.9)	17.2 (63.0)
Record low °C (°F)	−4.7 (23.5)	1.9 (35.4)	3.4 (38.1)	8.5 (47.3)	12.9 (55.2)	13.6 (56.5)	16.7 (62.1)	16.2 (61.2)	11.0 (51.8)	5.4 (41.7)	0.5 (32.9)	−4.5 (23.9)	−4.7 (23.5)
Average rainfall mm (inches)	21.0 (0.83)	19.8 (0.78)	42.5 (1.67)	113.0 (4.45)	171.3 (6.74)	217.6 (8.57)	242.7 (9.56)	243.2 (9.57)	128.8 (5.07)	51.7 (2.04)	25.3 (1.00)	16.1 (0.63)	1,292.9 (50.90)
Average rainy days	3.5	3.4	5.9	12.1	16.7	17.6	21.1	20.1	12.5	7.6	4.5	2.9	127.7
Average relative humidity (%)	78.4	75.5	72.4	74.0	76.8	82.8	85.5	86.0	83.7	81.3	79.6	78.4	79.6
Mean monthly sunshine hours	151.3	152.3	173.1	197.5	208.8	157.6	163.8	168.2	182.3	179.8	170.0	171.3	2,070.6
Source: Vietnam Institute for Building Science and Technology, Nchmf.gov.vn (August record high)
