= Mường La district =

Coordinates: 21.500°N 104.083°E

Mường La District Huyện Mường La
- District
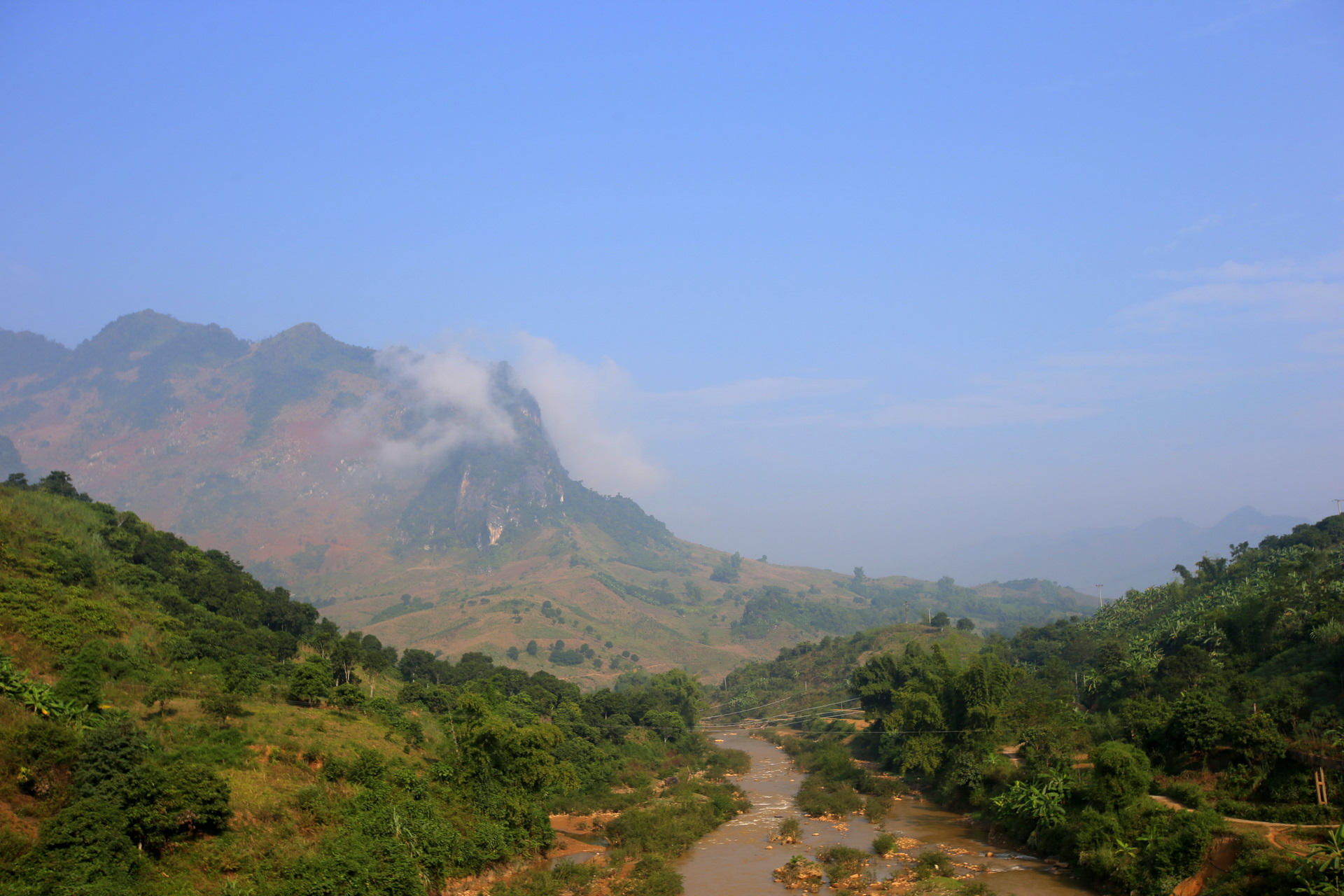
- Interactive map of Mường La District
- Country: Vietnam
- Region: Northwest
- Province: Sơn La
- Capital: Ít Ong

Area
  - Total: 544 sq mi (1,408 km^{2})

Population (2003)
  - Total: 74,668
- Time zone: UTC+7 (UTC + 7)

Mường La is a former rural district of Sơn La province in the Northwest region of Vietnam. As of 2003, the district had a population of 74,668. The district covers an area of 1,408 km^{2}. The district capital lies at Ít Ong.
