= Thuận Châu district =

District in the Northwest (Tây Bắc) region of Vietnam

Coordinates: 21.500°N 103.667°E

Thuận Châu district Huyện Thuận Châu
- District
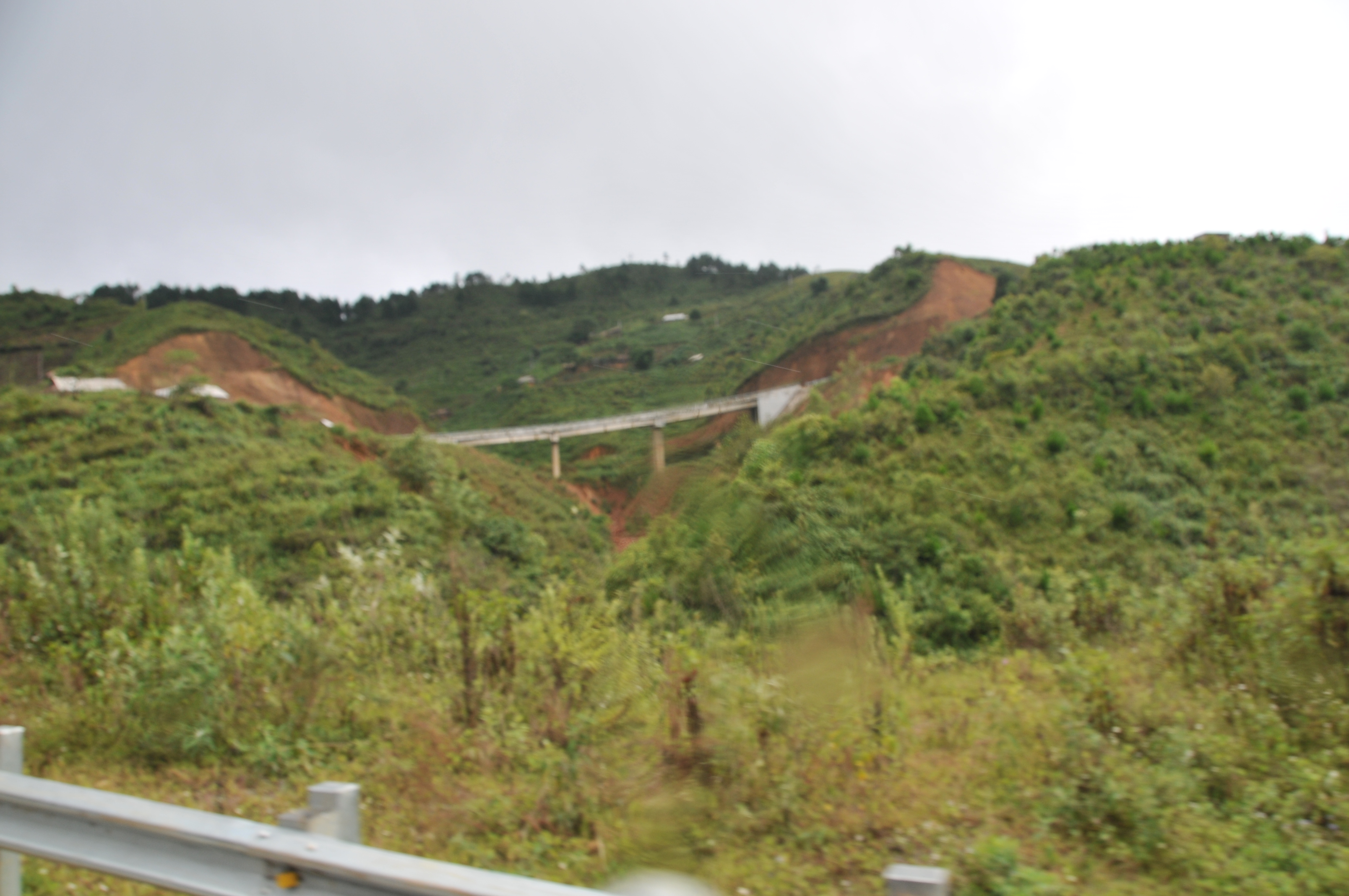
- View of the bridge in the area
- Interactive map of Thuận Châu district
- Country: Vietnam
- Region: Northwest
- Province: Sơn La
- Capital: Thuận Châu

Area
  - Total: 1,535 km^{2} (593 sq mi)

Population (2019)
  - Total: 172,763
  - Density: 112.5/km^{2} (291.5/sq mi)
- Time zone: UTC+7 (UTC + 7)

Thuận Châu is a former rural district of Sơn La province in the Northwest region of Vietnam. As of 2019, the district had a population of 172,763. The district covers an area of 1535 km^{2}. The district capital lies at Thuận Châu.

The Dry Laha (Phlao) and Kháng languages are spoken in Thuận Châu District.
