= Northwest (Vietnam) =

Region of Vietnam

Coordinates: 21°33′N 104°30′E

Northwest (Vietnam) Tây Bắc Bộ
- Location of the Tây Bắc (Northwest) region in Vietnam at orange top left
- Country: Vietnam

Area
  - Total: 50,565.71 km^{2} (19,523.53 sq mi)

Population (2022)
  - Total: 4,911,370
  - Density: 97.1285/km^{2} (251.562/sq mi)

GDP
  - Total: VND 190 trillion US$ 8.3 billion (2021)
- Time zone: UTC+7 (UTC +7)
- HDI (2022): 0.685 high · 4th

The Northwest (Vietnamese: Tây Bắc Bộ) is a geographic subregion of Vietnam, located west of the Northeast and south of the China-Vietnam border. The Northwest is one of the two sub-regions which make up the Northern Midland and Mountainous Regions of Northern Vietnam.

== History ==
A large area of the region was previously a part of the Sip Song Chau Tai, Tai-Meo Autonomous Region, which was dissolved in 1954. It was renamed the "Northwest Autonomous Region" (Khu Tự trị Tây Bắc) in 1961, in order to not highlight just two of the many ethnic groups in this zone. The autonomy was rescinded after the Fall of Saigon of 1975.

== Provinces ==
Statistics of Northwest Vietnam (Tây Bắc)
Province- Level Division	Capital	Population (2025)	Area (in km^{2})
Điện Biên	Điện Biên Phủ	673,091	9,539.93
Hòa Bình	Hòa Bình City	980,289	4,590.82
Lai Châu	Lai Châu	512,601	9,068.73
Lào Cai	Lào Cai	836,913	6,364.25
Sơn La	Sơn La	1,404,587	14,108.89
Yên Bái	Yên Bái	941,872	6,892.67

Phú Thọ and Hà Giang provinces were also considered part of the broader Northwest region.

== See also ==
- Regions of Vietnam
