= Administrative divisions of Thailand =

Thailand is a unitary state, which means the territories are separated into central co-dependencies, with the central government deciding everything for the provinces. The kingdom is separated into multiple levels including regions, provinces, and many more. Though, formally, Thailand is separated into three levels: provinces, districts, and sub-districts, there are also informal divisions such as parimonthon, and phak. Furthermore, there are administrative divisions of the same level with different names such as the first-level divisions of the province and the special administrative region.

The governance is separated into two branches, regular and municipal administration. The regular administration is governed by the central government directly, with the municipal administration being given more autonomy by the central government, though still heavily restricted due to the over centralization of the Thai administrative system. This system arose during Rama V's reign where the governing system of the Kingdom of Siam was changing rapidly due to westernization.

== Provincial administrative divisions ==
=== Provinces ===
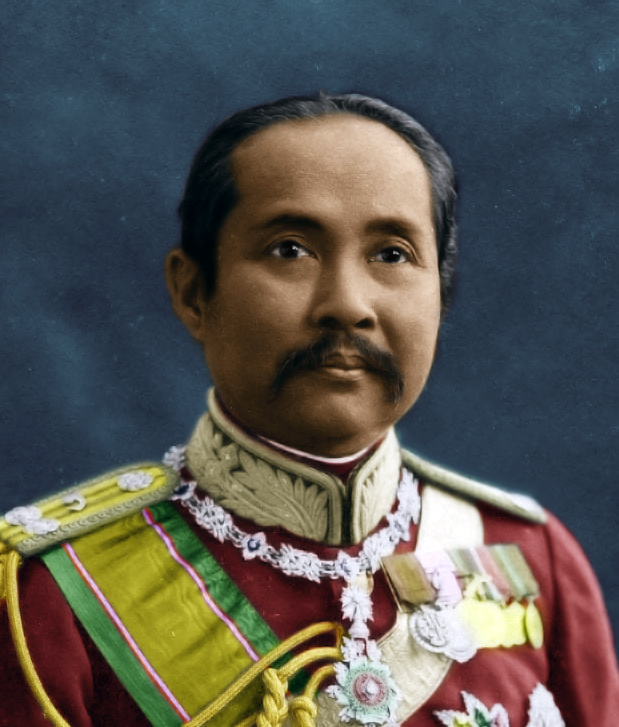
Chulalongkorn, Father of Modern Thailand

Changwat (Thai: จังหวัด) or provinces is the first level of administration, the highest level, of Thailand. Thailand is separated into 76 provinces, though commonly mistaken as 77 provinces due to Bangkok's former status as a province itself. This is the highest level of administrative division within the kingdom. Each of the provinces are led by governor. The changwat is responsible for implementing state policy and enforcing laws.

==== Governance ====
The provinces are governed by a governor appointed by the central government. Specifically, the Ministry of the Interior is a part of the Bangkok Government. The norm for naming the provinces is using the provincial capital as the name, which is why they are called namesake cities. A notable difference from history was during the post-Franco-Siamese crisis period when there was a DMZ around the border which falls on the Mekong river. During this time, there was a province called Nong Khai but the capital was in Ban Makkhaeng. A province is administered by a governor (ผู้ว่าราชการจังหวัด) who is appointed by the Minister of Interior. The provinces are named after their namesake cities, a cities which were the "capital" at the time of its founding. Also, in several provinces the administration has been moved into a new building outside the city.

==== History ====
===== Ayutthaya Kingdom =====
Most provinces date back to the time of subservient city-states, chiefdoms, and even vassal kingdoms. The polity was called muangs, not to be confused with modern muangs which means cities, which had their own satellite muangs. Traditionally ruled by a local ruling family, these muangs had a high level of autonomy. The highest king of these muangs, phaya or khun luang, though the titles changes over history, ruled these muangs through a system of tributes. The king did not have much control over these muangs which lead to uprisings and rebellions. During the war, these muangs often switched sides which leads to the downfall of the Ayutthaya Kingdom.

The provinces were separated into two classes and four different levels.

Ayutthaya's Administration Division
Levels	First	Second	Third	Forth
Central	Wiang (เวียง)	Wang (วัง)	Khlang (คลัง)	Na (นา)
Vassal	Muang Luk Luang (เมืองลูกหลวง)	Inner Hua Muang (หัวเมืองชั้นใน)	Outer Hua Muang (หัวเมืองชั้นนอก)	Muang Prathetsarat (เมืองประเทศราช)

===== Rattanakosin Kingdom =====
Administrative divisions during the Rattanakosin Kingdom

During this era, nothing changed much at the beginning. But when the western colonial powers started to eye the region, The Siamese government took to reform their administrative division into a form that much resembles the modern structure. In 1882, much of the current political geography of Siam had changed drastically. Rama V, who had been ramping up the reformation of Siam, had devised a plan to divide Siam into several levels of administration. During this era, the province wasn't the highest level of division. This falls to the monthon and the vassal kingdoms. At the time, Siam was a minor power, controlling several minor kingdoms on their frontiers with the major colonial powers. By, 1892, much of the divisions had already been formed, though this is far from modern Thailand's divisional structure, and by 1900 most of the territory gained during the rule of Rama III were lost to France and Britain.

In 1908, a new division called boriwen was introduced, though later abolished due to its overlapping duties with other local governments, and the bureaucratic costs to maintain the divisions.

In 1932, there were major reforms all over the kingdom, monthon was abolished, provinces merged, and several other divisions dissolved into higher divisions to cut costs. The former provinces that were lost are merged into other provinces or ceded to western powers.

During the 20th century, a massive reform occurred gradually over the century, which saw the formation of several provinces through partitions. The newest province is Bueng Kan which split from Nong Khai on 23 March 2011.

=== Current and Former Capital of Thailand ===
CITY-STATES ERA
Many dozen Tai-ethic city-states existed from 0 AD to 1000 AD. Tais migrated into southeast Asia, then occupied and replace the native inhabitants.
Dvaravati Civilizations								
Asadvarapura Kingdom	Lavo Kingdom	Kamlanka Kingdom	Syamapura Kingdom	Singhanavati Kingdom				
Ase (Phraek Si Racha) 800s. - 950s.	Lavo (Lopburi) 468-1082	Kamlanka Kingdom	Ayojjhapura 400s. - 700s.	Yonok Nakhon Chaiburi Ratchathani Si Chang Saen (BC) 673-467 (AD) Capital Destroyed				
Phitsanulok 950s. - 1000s..	Lavo (Lopburi) 468-1082	Manohana unknown - 590s.	Sambuka (Nakhon Pathom) 700s. - 800s. Disintegration	Yonok Nakhon Chaiburi Ratchathani Si Chang Saen (BC) 673-467 (AD) Capital Destroyed				
Phetchaburi 1000s. - 1050s.	Lavo (Lopburi) 468-1082	Sambuka (Nakhon Pathom) 590s. - 1100s.		Vieng Preuksa 545-638 Kingdom Reestablished, Capital Moved				
Ase (Phraek Si Racha) 1050s. - 1080s.	Lavo (Lopburi) 468-1082	Sambuka (Nakhon Pathom) 590s. - 1100s.		Vieng Preuksa 545-638 Kingdom Reestablished, Capital Moved				
Chai Nat 1080s. - 1100s.	Lavo (Lopburi) 468-1082	Sambukapatthana 1100s.-1200s. Disintegration		Vieng Preuksa 545-638 Kingdom Reestablished, Capital Moved				Wendan States
Sing Buri 1100s. - 1180s.	Lavo (Lopburi) 468-1082	Sambukapatthana 1100s.-1200s. Disintegration		Vieng Preuksa 545-638 Kingdom Reestablished, Capital Moved				Kantharawichai 580-800s. Annexed by Khmer Empire
Siam Confederation 1080-1351 (as a confederation) 1351-1438 (seat in Ayutthaya)				Vieng Preuksa 545-638 Kingdom Reestablished, Capital Moved				Haripunchai Kingdom
Suvarnapura Kingdom	Ayothaya (Ayutthaya) 1082–1351 Ayutthaya was partitioned and became a capital territory (semi-independent)	Suphannaphum Confederation	Phrip Phri Kingdom	Hiran-Ngoenyang Kingdom				Haripunchai (Lamphun) 629-1281 Annexed by Hiran-Ngoenyang
Phraek Si Racha 1180-1125 Annexed by Phrip Phri and Suphannaphum	Ayothaya (Ayutthaya) 1082–1351 Ayutthaya was partitioned and became a capital territory (semi-independent)	Suphanburi 913-1351 Joined Ayutthaya	Phetchaburi 1188-1351 Joined Ayutthaya	Hiran 638 - 850				Haripunchai (Lamphun) 629-1281 Annexed by Hiran-Ngoenyang
	Ayothaya (Ayutthaya) 1082–1351 Ayutthaya was partitioned and became a capital territory (semi-independent)	Suphanburi 913-1351 Joined Ayutthaya	Phetchaburi 1188-1351 Joined Ayutthaya	Ngoenyang 850-1262				Phayao Kingdom
	Ayothaya (Ayutthaya) 1082–1351 Ayutthaya was partitioned and became a capital territory (semi-independent)	Suphanburi 913-1351 Joined Ayutthaya	Phetchaburi 1188-1351 Joined Ayutthaya	Chiang Rai 1262-1275				Phayao 1094–1338 Lanna Annexed
Chaliang Kingdom	Ayothaya (Ayutthaya) 1082–1351 Ayutthaya was partitioned and became a capital territory (semi-independent)	Suphanburi 913-1351 Joined Ayutthaya	Phetchaburi 1188-1351 Joined Ayutthaya	Fang 1275–1281				Phayao 1094–1338 Lanna Annexed
Chaliang (Si Satchanalai) 1238-1347 Came under Sukhothai and became co-capitals	Ayothaya (Ayutthaya) 1082–1351 Ayutthaya was partitioned and became a capital territory (semi-independent)	Suphanburi 913-1351 Joined Ayutthaya	Phetchaburi 1188-1351 Joined Ayutthaya	Wiang Kum Kam 1281–1292 Kingdom Reestablished as Lanna				Phayao 1094–1338 Lanna Annexed
Chaliang (Si Satchanalai) 1238-1347 Came under Sukhothai and became co-capitals	Lavo (Lopburi) 1351-1388 Joined Ayutthaya	Suphanburi 913-1351 Joined Ayutthaya	Phetchaburi 1188-1351 Joined Ayutthaya	Wiang Kum Kam 1281–1292 Kingdom Reestablished as Lanna				Phayao 1094–1338 Lanna Annexed
FEUDAL ERA
Sukhothai Kingdom	Ayutthaya Kingdom		Nakhon Si Thammarat Kingdom	Lanna Kingdom				State of Soi
Sukhothai 1238-1347	Ayutthaya Kingdom		Nakhon Si Thammarat 1200s-1438 Joined Ayutthaya	Noppaburi Si Nakhon Ping Chiang Mai 1292–1775 Direct Governance then Kingdom Partitioned into Rattanatingsa, Nan, Lampang, Lamphun, Phrae, Thoen				State of Soi
Songkhwae (Phitsanulok) 1347–1438 Ayutthaya Annexed	Krung Thep Dvaravati Si Ayutthaya 1351–1463		Nakhon Si Thammarat 1200s-1438 Joined Ayutthaya	Noppaburi Si Nakhon Ping Chiang Mai 1292–1775 Direct Governance then Kingdom Partitioned into Rattanatingsa, Nan, Lampang, Lamphun, Phrae, Thoen				State of Soi
The Siam Confederation is consolidated and centralized as the Ayutthaya kingdom with Sukhothai and Nakhon si Thammarat being subjugated and downgraded into a principality and subsequently a duchy. end of the confederacy and transition into a kingdom				Noppaburi Si Nakhon Ping Chiang Mai 1292–1775 Direct Governance then Kingdom Partitioned into Rattanatingsa, Nan, Lampang, Lamphun, Phrae, Thoen				Muang Soi 1126-1600s Destroyed
	Phitsanulok 1463-1488		Nakhon Si Thammarat 1438-1782 Rattanakosin Annexed	Noppaburi Si Nakhon Ping Chiang Mai 1292–1775 Direct Governance then Kingdom Partitioned into Rattanatingsa, Nan, Lampang, Lamphun, Phrae, Thoen				Muang Soi 1126-1600s Destroyed
	Krung Thep Dvaravati Si Ayutthaya 1488-1680	Phitsanulok 1488-1590 (co-capital)	Nakhon Si Thammarat 1438-1782 Rattanakosin Annexed	Noppaburi Si Nakhon Ping Chiang Mai 1292–1775 Direct Governance then Kingdom Partitioned into Rattanatingsa, Nan, Lampang, Lamphun, Phrae, Thoen				Muang Soi 1126-1600s Destroyed
	Lopburi 1680-1688		Nakhon Si Thammarat 1438-1782 Rattanakosin Annexed	Noppaburi Si Nakhon Ping Chiang Mai 1292–1775 Direct Governance then Kingdom Partitioned into Rattanatingsa, Nan, Lampang, Lamphun, Phrae, Thoen				Muang Soi 1126-1600s Destroyed
	Krung Thep Dvaravati Si Ayutthaya 1688-1767 Kingdom Partitioned into Phimai, Thonburi, Phitsanulok, Sawangkhaburi		Nakhon Si Thammarat 1438-1782 Rattanakosin Annexed	Noppaburi Si Nakhon Ping Chiang Mai 1292–1775 Direct Governance then Kingdom Partitioned into Rattanatingsa, Nan, Lampang, Lamphun, Phrae, Thoen				
Phimai Kingdom	Thonburi Kingdom	Phitsanulok Kingdom	Nakhon Si Thammarat 1438-1782 Rattanakosin Annexed	Noppaburi Si Nakhon Ping Chiang Mai 1292–1775 Direct Governance then Kingdom Partitioned into Rattanatingsa, Nan, Lampang, Lamphun, Phrae, Thoen				Sawangkhaburi
Phimai 1767 Thonburi Annexed	Krung Thonburi Si Mahasamut 1767–1782 Coup & Refounded	Phitsanulok 1767 Thonburi Annexed	Nakhon Si Thammarat 1438-1782 Rattanakosin Annexed	Noppaburi Si Nakhon Ping Chiang Mai 1292–1775 Direct Governance then Kingdom Partitioned into Rattanatingsa, Nan, Lampang, Lamphun, Phrae, Thoen				Sawangkhaburi 1767 Thonburi Annexed
MODERN ERA
Rattanakosin Kingdom				Rattanatingsa Kingdom	Nan Kingdom	Lampang Principality	Lamphun Principality	Phrae Principality
Pra Nakhon (Bangkok) 1782–1932 Kingdom Restructured				Noppaburi Si Nakhon Ping Chiang Mai 1802–1899	Nanthaburi Si Nakhon Nan 1802–1899	Nakhon Lampang 1802–1899	Nakhon Lamphun 1802–1899	Nakhon Phrae 1802–1899
Pra Nakhon (Bangkok) 1782–1932 Kingdom Restructured				Rattanakosin Annexed				
Thailand
Krung Thep Maha Nakhon etc. etc. (Bangkok) 1932-Now

=== Former Provinces of Thailand ===
The former of provinces are administrative divisions which were either ceded, partitioned, or merged with the neighbouring territories. Over the course of history, the definition of provinces may change, thus the provinces listed under here are definitive provinces, or provinces which are created according to decrees. Furthermore, the list also includes provinces which were created during the mandala system era. These mandala provinces are defined as cities which controlled the surrounding cities, which in itself has subservient townships and villages. Examples of definite province include the province of Minburi, which was created through a decree passed by Rama V. Examples of mandala provinces include the province of Nakhon Ratchasima. Though Nakhon Ratchasima may be classified as a definite province these days, back in the days of King Rama I, Nakhon Ratchasima was the very definition of a mandala province. For example, the city of Nakhon Ratchasima oversaw the city of Si Phum, which inturn oversaw the city of Kalasin, which inturn oversaw the neighbouring townships and villages' affairs. What is not listed here are muang prathetsarat. These polities are not provinces by any definition, but are vassal states. Though, some may be in the grey area, by which treads the line between full provincialship and vassalage. For example, the Principality of Thoen.

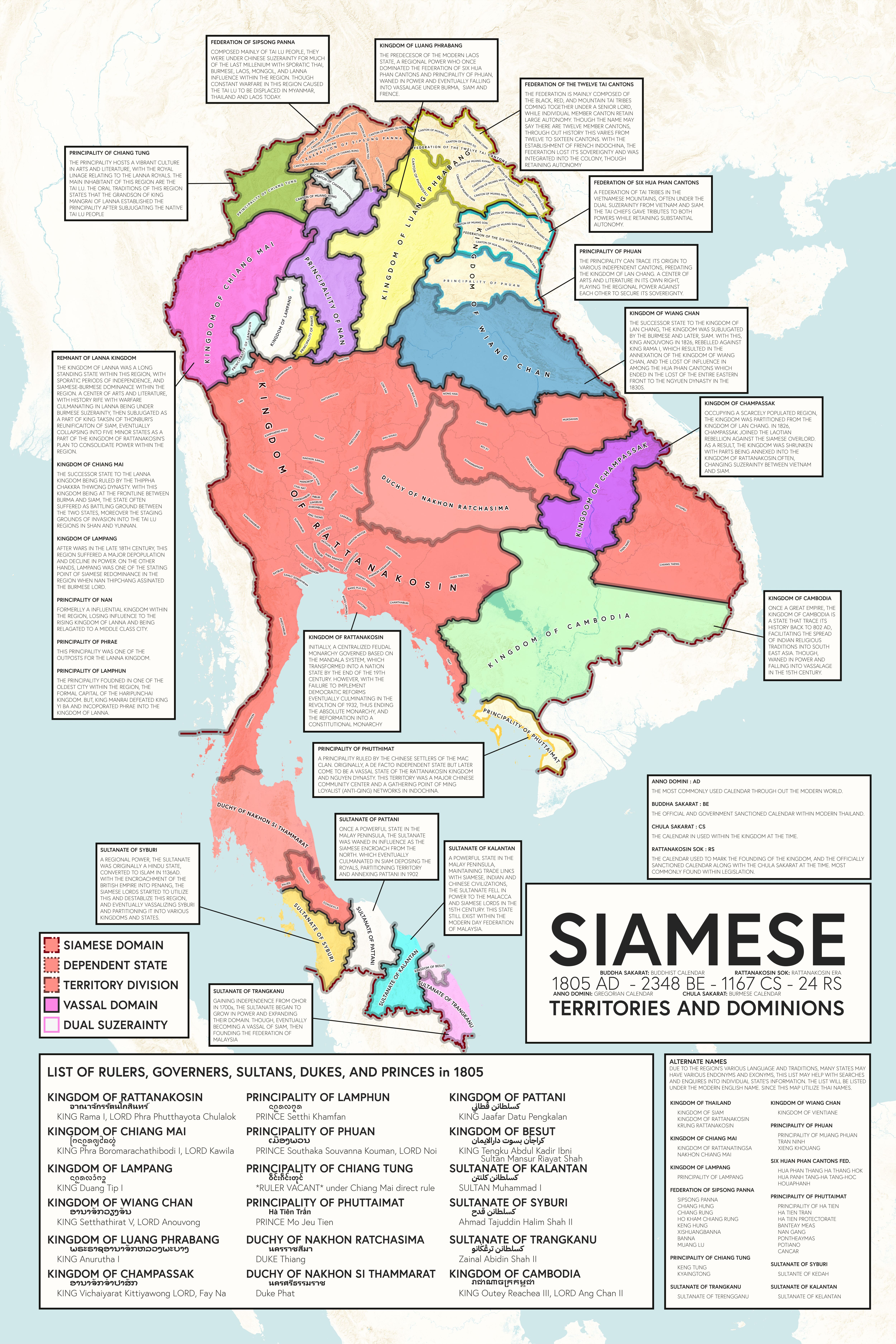
Maximum Siamese influence within south east Asia (1806) (quickly losing territory their after)

Siam in 1900

==== Core Provinces ====
Provinces (Thai Name)	Original Names or Native Names	Made Province / Founded in	Ceased to be Province in	Fate	Today Part of
Bang Lamung บางละมุง	บ้านนาเกลือ Ban Na Kleua	1782	1910s	merged with Bang Pla Soi	Chonburi Thailand
Bang Pla Soi	บางปลาสร้อย	1376	1910s	merged with Bang Lamung and Phanat Nikhom to form Chonburi	Chonburi Thailand
Chaibadan	ชัยบาดาล	700s	1902	merged into Wichianburi	Phetchabun Thailand
Chiaya ไชยา	ครหิ Khri	1820s	1890s	merged into Kanchanadit	Surat Thani Thailand
Inburi	อินทร์บุรี	1369	1897	merged into Singburi	Singburi Thailand
Kabinburi กะบิ่นบุรี (กระบินทร์บุรี)	ด่านหนุมาน Dan Nu Man	1901	1926	merged with Prachinburi	Prachinburi and Sa Kaeo Thailand
Khirirat Nikhom คีรีรัฐนิคม	ท่าขนอน Tha Khanon	1820s	1890s	merged into Kanchanadit	Surat Thani Thailand
Kraburi กระบุรี	ตระ Tra	1870s	1896	merged into Ranong	Ranong Thailand
Lang Suan หลังสวน	คลังสวน Klang Suan	1870s	1932	merged into Chumphon	Chumphon Thailand
Lom Sak หล่มสัก	วัดป่า Wat Pa	1767	1916	partitioned between Phetchabun and Loei	Phetchabun and Loei Thailand
Manorom	มโนรมย์	before 1770s	1897	merged into Chai Nat	Chai Nat Thailand
Min Buri มีนบุรี	ท้องนากว้างใหญ่ Thongna Kwangyai	1901	1931	merged into Phra Nakhon	Bangkok Thailand
Nakhon Chai Si	นครชัยศรี	1570s	1910s	capital moved to Nakhon Pathom	Nakhon Pathom Thailand
Nakhon Khuan Khan	นครเขื่อนขันธ์	1819	1915	renamed Phra Pradaeng	Bangkok and Samut Prakan Thailand
Phanat Nikhom พนัสนิคม	พระรถ Phra Rot	before 1770s	1910s	merged with Bang Pla Soi	Chonburi Thailand
Phanom Sarakham พนมสารคาม	ดงยาง Dong Yang	before 1770s	1910s	merged into Chachoengsao	Chachoengsao Thailand
Phayu Ha Khiri พยุหะคีรี	บ้านพยุแดน Ban Phayu Daen	before 1770s	1890s	merged into Nakhon Sawan	Nakhon Sawan Thailand
Phichai	พิชัย	1500s	1887	capital moved to Uttaradit	Uttaradit, Phitsanulok, and Loei Thailand, Sainyaburi and Vientiane Laos
Phra Nakhon พระนคร	ชนะสงคราม Chana Songkhram	1782	1972	merged with Thonburi to form Bangkok	Bangkok Thailand
Phra Nakhon พระนคร	บางกอก Bang Kok	1782	1972	merged with Thonburi to form Bangkok	Bangkok Thailand
Phromburi พรหมบุรี	พรหมนคร Phrom Nakhon	1350s	1890s	merged into Singburi	Singburi Thailand
Pra Pradaeng พระประแดง	นครเขื่อนขันธ์ Nakhon Kheuan Khan	1915	1932	merged with Samut Prakan, partitioned from Pra Nakhon and Samut Prakan, merged between Samut Prakan and Thonburi	Samut Prakan and Bangkok Thailand
Sangkhaburi สรรคบุรี	แพรกศรีราชา Phraek Siracha	1300s	1897	merged into Chai Nat	Chai Nat Thailand
Sangkhaburi สรรคบุรี	ไตรตรึงส์ Trai Treung	1300s	1897	merged into Chai Nat	Chai Nat Thailand
Sawankhalok	สวรรคโลก	1894	1939	merge with Sukhothai to form Sawankhalok, later changing the name to Sukhothai	Sukhothai Thailand
Si Thep ศรีเทพ	อภัยสาลี Aphai Sali	before 1770s	1820s	capital moved to Wichianburi	Phetchabun Thailand
Takua Pa ตะกั่วป่า	ตะโกลา Taloka	1870s	1932	merged into Pang Nga	Pang Nga Thailand
Takua Thung ตะกั่วทุ่ง	กราภูงา Kra Phunga	1820s	1899	merged into Pang Nga	Pang Nga Thailand
Thalang	ถลาง	1820s	1812	destroyed during the Burmese–Siamese War (1809–1812), which then the territory is administered by Nakhon Si Thammarat	Phuket Thailand
Thanyaburi ธัญบุรี	รังสิต Rangsit	1901	1932	merged into Pathum Thani	Pathum Thani Thailand
Thonburi Si Mahasamut ธนบุรีศรีมหาสมุทร	บางกอก Bang Kok	1767	1972	merged with Phra Nakhon to form Bangkok	Bangkok Thailand
Wichianburi วิเชียรบุรี	ท่าโรง Tha Rong	1830s	1898	merged into Phetchabun	Phetchabun Thailand

==== Lanna Frontier ====
Provinces (Thai Name)	Original Names or Native Names	Made Province / Founded in	Ceased to be Province in	Fate	Today Part of
Chiang Khaeng เชียงแขง	ဝဵင်းၵဵင်းၸဵင် Weng Keng Cheng	1892	1893	partitioned between France and Britain, as part of the Franco-Siamese War in 1893	Shan State Myanmar, Luang Namtha and Bokeo Laos
Saharat Thai Doem	สหรัฐไทยเดิม	1943	1945	ceded to Britain	Shan State Myanmar
Uthai อุทัย Lan Chang ล้านช้าง	ປາກລາຍ Paklay	1940	1945	ceded to France	Sainyabuli and Luang Prabang Laos

==== Lan Chang Frontier ====
Provinces (Thai Name)	Original Names or Native Names	Made Province / Founded in	Ceased to be Province in	Fate	Today Part of
Attapue อัตตะปือ	ອັດກະປື Atkapu	1778	1893	ceded to France, as part of the Franco-Siamese War in 1893	Attapeu Laos, Kon Tum and Gia Lai Vietnam
Borikhan Nikhom บริคัณฑ์นิคม	ປະຊຸມພະນາລັຍ Paxoumphanalai	1830	1893	ceded to France, as part of the Franco-Siamese War in 1893	Bolikhamxai Laos
Chaiburi ไชยบุรี	ປາກນ້ຳສົງຄາມ Paknam Songkham	1830	1914	merged with Nong Khai	Bueng Kan Thailand
Chiang Khouang เชียงขวาง	ພວນ Phouan	1828	1893	ceded to France, as part of the Franco-Siamese War in 1893	Xiangkhouang Laos
Chonnabot ชนบท	ຫນອງແກ້ວ Nongkeo (ບຶງແກ້ວ) (Bungkeo)	1792	1914	partitioned between Chaiyaphum and Khon Kaen	Chaiyaphum and Khon Kaen Thailand
Det Udom เดชอุดม	ປາກໂດມ Pakdom (ໂດມໃຫຍ່) (Domnyai)	1845	1912	merged into Sisaket	Ubon Ratchathani Thailand
Kamalasai กมลาสัย	ສະປົວດົງມະຂາມເກົ່າ Sapouadongmakhamkao	1840	1913	partitioned between Kalasin and Roi Et	Kalasin and Roi Et Thailand
Kham Kert คำเกิด	ຄຳເກີດ Khamkeut	1839	1893	ceded to France, as part of the Franco-Siamese War in 1893	Khammouane Laos
Kham Muan คำม่วน	ຄຳມ່ວນ Khammouan	1839	1893	ceded to France, as part of the Franco-Siamese War in 1893	Khammouane Laos
Kham Thong Luang คำทองหลวง	ແກ້ງອາເຣີມ Kengareum	1828	1893	ceded to France, as part of the Franco-Siamese War in 1893	Stung Teng Cambodia
Khemmarat เขมราฐ (เขมราฐธานี)	ໂຄກກົ່ງດົງພະນຽງ Khokkongdongphaniang	1814	1893	partitioned between Siam and France, merged into Ubon Ratchathani, as part of the Franco-Siamese War in 1893	Ubon Ratchathani and Yasothon Thailand, Savannakhet Laos
Khon San คอนสาร	ຄອນສານ Khonsan	1787	1890s	partitioned between Chaiyaphum and Khon Kaen	Chaiyaphum and Khon Kaen Thailand
Khukhan ขุขันธ์ (คุขันธ์)	ປາສາດສີ່ຫຼ່ຽມ Pasat Siliam	1759	1938	partitioned between Siam and France, merged with Sisaket and Det Udom District, but later the province moved the capital to Sisaket, as part of the Franco-Siamese War in 1893	Ubon Ratchathani and Sisaket Thailand, Oddar Meanchey and Preah Vihear Cambodia
Phra Tabong พระตะบอง	បាត់ដំបង Badthumbang	1795	1893	ceded to France, as part of the Franco-Siamese War in 1893	Banteay Meanchey, Siem Reap, Pailin, and Battambang Cambodia
Nang Rong นางรอง	ນະຮອງ Nahong	1820s	1892	merged into Buriram	Buriram Thailand
Nong นอง	ນອງ Nong	1825	1890s	merged with Mukdahan	Savannakhet Laos
Nong Han หนองหาร (หนองละหาร)	ຫນອງຫານນ້ອຍ Nonghannoy	1787	1910s	merged with Nong Khai	Nong Khai Thailand
Phon Phisai โพนพิสัย	ໂພນແພງ Phonpheng	1830	1906	merged with Nong Khai	Nong Khai and Bueng Kan Thailand
Phu Khiao	ภูเขียว	1810s	1899	merged into Chaiyaphum	Chaiyaphum Thailand
Phu Len Chang ภูแล่นช้าง	ພູແດນຊ້າງ Phoudenxang	1840	1910s	merged into Kalasin	Kalasin Thailand
Phutthaisong พุทไธสง	ຫມາກເຟືອງຫົວແຮດ Makfuang Houahet	1820s	1892	merged into Buriram	Buriram Thailand
Pra Khon Chai ประโคนชัย (ตะลุง)	ຕະລຸມດອ Taloumdo ตลุง Talung	1820s	1892	merged into Buriram	Buriram Thailand
Rattanaburi รัตนบุรี	เมืองศรีนครเตา Muang Si Nakhon Tao	1820s	1892	merged into Buriram	Surin Thailand
Salawan สาละวัน	ເມືອງມັ່ນ Muangman	1828	1893	ceded to France, as part of the Franco-Siamese War in 1893	Salavan and Sekong Laos
Sangkha สังขะ (สังฆะ)	ໂຄກອັຈຈະ Khokachcha	1759	1893	partitioned between Siam and France, merged into Surin, as part of the Franco-Siamese War in 1893	Surin Thailand, Oddar Meanchey and Siem Reap Cambodia
Suwannaphum สุวรรณภูมิ	ສີພູມ Siphum	1772	1908	partitioned between Maha Sarakham and Roi Et	Maha Sarakham and Roi Et Thailand
Tha Uthen ท่าอุเทน	ທ່າບຶງອຸ Thabungou	1830	1907	merged with Nakhon Phanom	Nakhon Phanom Thailand
Wang วัง	ວັງ Vang	1830	1890s	merged with Mukdahan	Savannakhet Laos

==== Khmer Frontier ====
Provinces (Thai Name)	Original Names or Native Names	Made Province / Founded in	Ceased to be Province in	Fate	Today Part of
Chiang Taeng เชียงแตง	ស្ទឹងត្រែង Stoengtrang	1784	1893	ceded to France, as part of the Franco-Siamese War in 1893	Kratié, Stung Treng, Ratanakiri, and Mondulkiri Cambodia, Đắk Lắk, Đắk Nông and Gia Lai Vietnam
Khlung	ขลุง	1820s	1898	partitioned between Chanthaburi and Trat, as part of the Franco-Siamese War in 1893, when the province of Chanthaburi came under French occupation, in which a 10 km DMZ was declared on the Thai side of the Mekong river.	Chanthaburi and Trat Thailand
Phanom Sok พนมสก	ភ្នំស្រុក Phnomsrok	1835	1893	ceded to France, as part of the Franco-Siamese War in 1893	Banteay Meanchey, Siem Reap, and Oddar Meanchey Cambodia
Phibunsongkhram	พิบูลสงคราม	1941	1946	concession to France, allowing the Kingdom of Thailand to join the United Nation, passing the French veto.	Banteay Meanchey, Siem Reap, Oddar Meanchey, and Preah Vihear Cambodia
Nakhon Champassak นครจัมปาศักดิ์	ເມືອງຄັນເດີງ Muang Khandeung	1941	1946	concession to France, allowing the Kingdom of Thailand to join the United Nation, passing the French veto.	Preah Vihear and Stung Teng Cambodia, Champasak Laos
Phra Tabong พระตะบอง	បាត់ដំបង Badthumbang	1941	1946	concession to France, allowing the Kingdom of Thailand to join the United Nation, passing the French veto.	Battambang Cambodia
Patchan Khiri Khet ปัจจันตคีรีเขตร	ខេមរភូមិន្ទ Khemaraphoumin	1855	1893	partitioned between Siam and France, merged into Trat, as part of the Franco-Siamese War in 1893	Koh Kong Cambodia
Saen Pang แสนปาง	សៀមប៉ាង Siempang	1798	1893	ceded to France, as part of the Franco-Siamese War in 1893	Kratié, Stung Treng, Ratanakiri, and Mondulkiri Cambodia
Siemmarat เสียมราฐ	សៀមរាប Siemreab	1835	1893	ceded to France, as part of the Franco-Siamese War in 1893	Siem Reap Cambodia
Sisophon ศรีโสภณ	សិរីសោភ័ណ Serisaophoan	1835	1893	ceded to France, as part of the Franco-Siamese War in 1893	Banteay Meanchey Cambodia
Sitandon สี่ตันดอน	ເມືອງໂຂງ Muang Khong	1828	1893	ceded to France, as part of the Franco-Siamese War in 1893	Stung Teng Cambodia

==== Malay Frontier ====
Provinces (Thai Name)	Original Names or Native Names	Made Province / Founded in	Ceased to be Province in	Fate	Today Part of
Kalantan กลันตัน	Klate	1900 1943	1909 1945	joined as a vassal, partitioned between Siam and Britain, merged with Narathiwat, regained and ceded to Britain again, as part of the Anglo-Siamese Treaty of 1909, and World War II as a part of Si Rat Malai (The four Malay states)	Narathiwat Thailand, Kelantan Malaysia
Nong Chik หนองจิก	Tujong (Tawar/Nuachi)	1900	1900s	joied as a part of the Pattani Kingdom, partitioned and then merged into Pattani	Pattani Thailand
Palien ปะเหลียน	Palanda (Tanjong Sala)	1900	1891	merged into Kantang	Trang Thailand
Palit ปะลิส	Perlis	1900 1943	1909 1945	joined as a vassal, ceded to Britain, regained and ceded to Britain again, as part of the Anglo-Siamese Treaty of 1909, and World War II as a part of Si Rat Malai (The four Malay states)	Perlis Malaysia
Ra'Ngae ระแงะ	Tanjong Mas	1900	1909	joied as a part of the Pattani Kingdom, partitioned between Siam and Britain, merged into Narathiwat, as part of the Anglo-Siamese Treaty of 1909	Narathiwat Thailand, Kelantan Malaysia
Raman รามัน	Reman	1900	1909	joied as a part of the Pattani Kingdom, partitioned between Siam and Britain, merged into Yala, as part of the Anglo-Siamese Treaty of 1909	Yala Thailand, Perak Malaysia
Sai Buri สายบุรี	Selindungbayu-Semalanbulan-Matanduwah	1900	1932	joied as a part of the Pattani Kingdom, partitioned between Pattani and Narathiwat	Chumphon Thailand
Syburi ไทรบุรี	Kedah	1900 1943	1909 1945	joined as a vassal, ceded to Britain, regained and ceded to Britain again, as part of the Anglo-Siamese Treaty of 1909, and World War II as a part of Si Rat Malai (The four Malay states)	Kedah Malaysia
Trangkanu ตรังกานู	Tranung	1900 1943	1909 1945	joined as a vassal, ceded to Britain, regained and ceded to Britain again, as part of the Anglo-Siamese Treaty of 1909, and World War II as a part of Si Rat Malai (The four Malay states)	Terengganu Malaysia
Yaring ยะหริ่ง	Jaring	1900	1900s	joied as a part of the Pattani Kingdom, partitioned and then merged into Pattani	Pattani Thailand

- these provinces were formed in different periods but lost during 19th and 20th century

=== Current Provinces ===
Seal	Name	จังหวัด	Made Province in
	Amnat Charoen	อำนาจเจริญ	
	Ang Thong	อ่างทอง	
	Bangkok (special administrative area)	กรุงเทพมหานคร	
	Bueng Kan	บึงกาฬ	
	Buriram	บุรีรัมย์	1775
	Chachoengsao	ฉะเชิงเทรา	
	Chai Nat	ชัยนาท	
	Chaiyaphum	ชัยภูมิ	
	Chanthaburi	จันทบุรี	
	Chiang Mai	เชียงใหม่	
	Chiang Rai	เชียงราย	
	Chonburi	ชลบุรี	
	Chumphon	ชุมพร	
	Kalasin	กาฬสินธุ์	1791
	Kamphaeng Phet	กำแพงเพชร	
	Kanchanaburi	กาญจนบุรี	
	Khon Kaen	ขอนแก่น	1797
	Krabi	กระบี่	
	Lampang	ลำปาง	
	Lamphun	ลำพูน	
	Loei	เลย	
	Lopburi	ลพบุรี	
	Mae Hong Son	แม่ฮ่องสอน	
	Maha Sarakham	มหาสารคาม	1865
	Mukdahan	มุกดาหาร	1770
	Nakhon Nayok	นครนายก	
	Nakhon Pathom	นครปฐม	
	Nakhon Phanom	นครพนม	1796
	Nakhon Ratchasima	นครราชสีมา	1768
	Nakhon Sawan	นครสวรรค์	
	Nakhon Si Thammarat	นครศรีธรรมราช	
	Nan	น่าน	
	Narathiwat	นราธิวาส	
	Nong Bua Lamphu	หนองบัวลำภู	
	Nong Khai	หนองคาย	1827
	Nonthaburi	นนทบุรี	
	Pathum Thani	ปทุมธานี	
	Pattani	ปัตตานี	
	Phang Nga	พังงา	
	Phatthalung	พัทลุง	
	Phayao	พะเยา	
	Phetchabun	เพชรบูรณ์	
	Phetchaburi	เพชรบุรี	
	Phichit	พิจิตร	
	Phitsanulok	พิษณุโลก	
	Phra Nakhon Si Ayutthaya	พระนครศรีอยุธยา	
	Phrae	แพร่	
	Phuket	ภูเก็ต	
	Prachinburi	ปราจีนบุรี	
	Prachuap Khiri Khan	ประจวบคีรีขันธ์	
	Ranong	ระนอง	
	Ratchaburi	ราชบุรี	
	Rayong	ระยอง	
	Roi Et	ร้อยเอ็ด	1775
	Sa Kaeo	สระแก้ว	
	Sakon Nakhon	สกลนคร	1826
	Samut Prakan	สมุทรปราการ	
	Samut Sakhon	สมุทรสาคร	
	Samut Songkhram	สมุทรสงคราม	
	Saraburi	สระบุรี	
	Satun	สตูล	
	Sing Buri	สิงห์บุรี	
	Sisaket	ศรีสะเกษ	1782
	Songkhla	สงขลา	
	Sukhothai	สุโขทัย	
	Suphan Buri	สุพรรณบุรี	
	Surat Thani	สุราษฎร์ธานี	
	Surin	สุรินทร์	1759
	Tak	ตาก	
	Trang	ตรัง	
	Trat	ตราด	
	Ubon Ratchathani	อุบลราชธานี	1791
	Udon Thani	อุดรธานี	
	Uthai Thani	อุทัยธานี	
	Uttaradit	อุตรดิตถ์	
	Yala	ยะลา	
	Yasothon	ยโสธร	1814
	Total	ยอดรวม	

=== Amphoe (Districts) ===
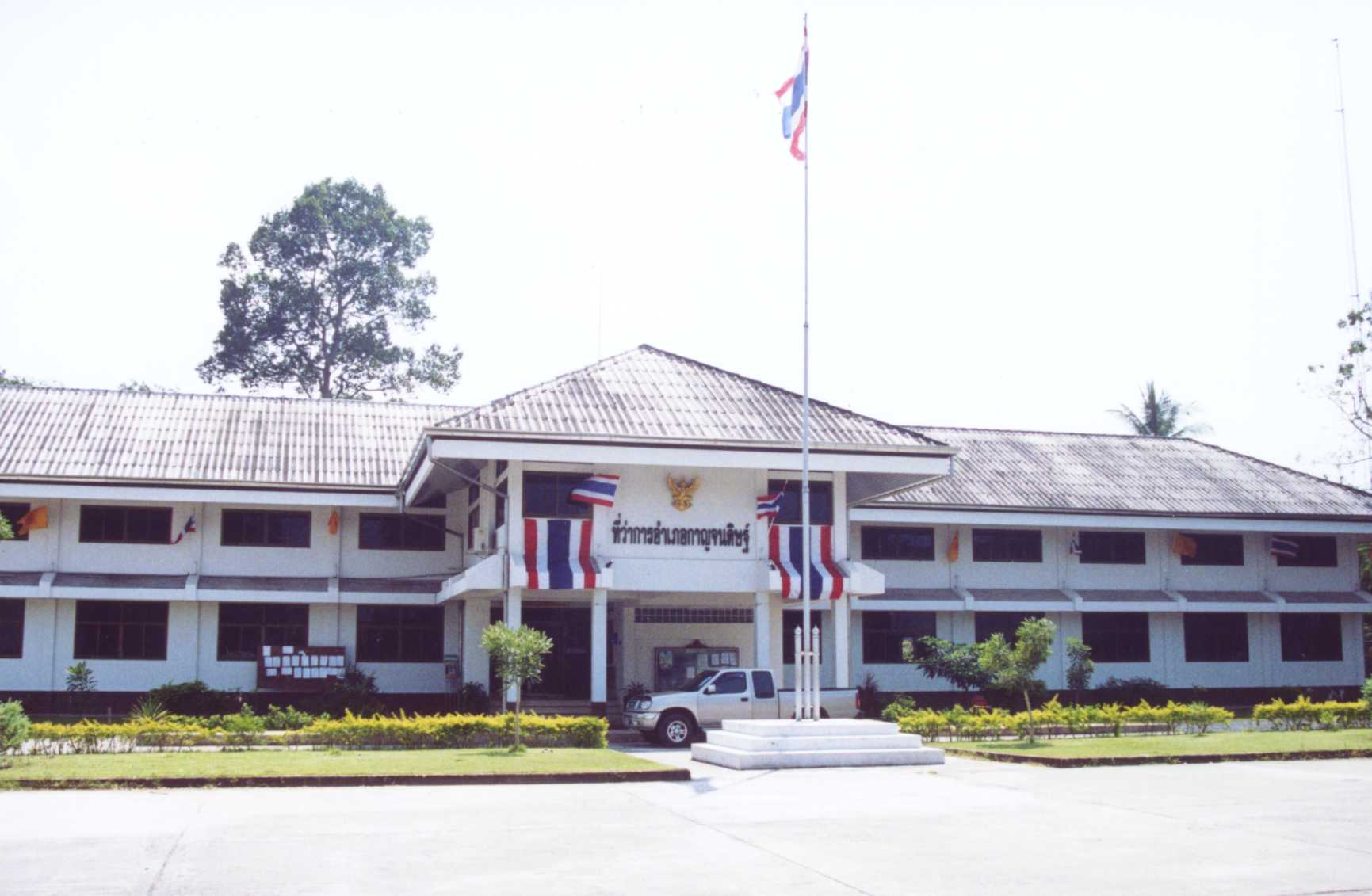
Kanchanadit District Office

Amphoe (Thai: อำเภอ) or districts are the second level of administration. There are 878 amphoe throughout Thailand. They are led by a Nai Amphoe (Thai: นายอำเภอ) or district chief who is appointed by the central government. These districts vary greatly in size and population. Amphoe mueang )Thai: อำเภอเมือง) are a term for amphoe that serve as or contain the capital of the province. Within these amphoe, there is either a thesaban nakhon or a thesaban mueang. Amphoe are responsible for general administrative work, clerical work and archives, and the public relations operations of the district. Furthermore, they are responsible for operations related to receptions, ceremonies, government ceremonies, religious ceremonies and various traditional events, operations of the Thai Red Cross Society and other charitable activities.

==== History ====
Amphoe originated from the RS115(1896) bill named Local Governing Regulations R.E. 115. At this time, the method for determining the area of an amphoe was to assign 10,000 citizens to a district.

Previously, another administrative division called king amphoe (Thai: กิ่งอำเภอ) or minor districts was in use. These were set up when a district was too large and became inconvenient to govern. In practice, these districts were effectively identical to normal amphoe. A king amphoe could have been promoted to an amphoe proper if it met sufficient requirements regarding infrastructure and population. The opposite was also possible, where an amphoe lost influence and was further downgraded into a king amphoe. In 2007, all king amphoe were upgraded to amphoe proper in order to streamline governance. There were 81 king amphoe in 2007 at the time.

=== Tambon (sub-districts) ===
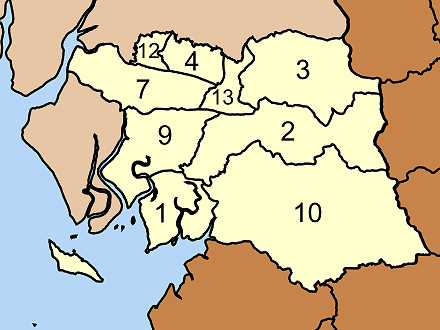
Tambons of Palien district

Tambon (Thai: ตำบล) or sub-districts are the third-level of administration. There are 7,255 tambon in Thailand. Tambon are responsible for the economic, societal, and cultural development of the area, organizing public services for the benefit of the people of their own locality. In addition, under the 2001-2006 Thaksin Shinawatra government, the OTOP (One Tambon One Product) program was launched, aiming to promote and recognize unique traditions, cultures, and products from every tambon.

==== History ====
Tambon were previously the second-level of administration before the establishment of amphoe. They were previously governed by a provincial capital who appointed a kamnan or phan as its leader. In 1892, they were downgraded into the third-level of administration.

=== Muban (villages) ===
Muban (Thai: หมู่บ้าน) or Villages are the fourth-level of administration in Thailand. There are 74,944 muban in Thailand. A muban is led by a phuyaiban (Thai: ผู้ใหญ่บ้าน), who is chosen through local elections. All elected phuyaiban must be approved by the central government. Once in office, they can serve for a 5-year term with no limits on re-election. In cities, the term chumchon (Thai: ชุมชน) is used, although this is an unofficial title and is unrelated to the central government.

== Local administrative divisions ==
=== Ordinary local administrative divisions ===
==== Thesaban (municipalities) ====
Thesaban (Thai: เทศบาล) or municipalities is the second level of administration. There are three types of municipalities: thesaban nakhon, thesaban muang, and thesaban tambon.

- Thesaban nakhon (เทศบาลนคร) is the highest of these municipalities and there are 30 of them. To qualify for a thesaban nakhon, an area needs to have at least 50,000 citizens and the necessary infrastructure for a city.
- Thesaban muang (เทศบาลเมือง) needs to have at least 10,000 citizens.
- Thesaban tambon (เทศบาลตำบล) is the lowest administrative level for a municipality. In order to qualify as a thesaban tambon, there needs to be an income of 5 million baht, 5,000 citizens, and a density of 1,500 per square km.

They are known for being complicated geographically. It can extend over a few tambons or be contained within a tambon. Their responsibility are to maintain public order, provide and maintain land and waterways, maintain cleanliness of roads. or corridors and public places Including the disposal of solid waste and sewage, and prevent and suppress contagious diseases.

Originally thesaban were sanitation districts called sukhaphiban (Thai: สุขาภิบาล) created to manage waste. Sukhaphiban used to co-exist with thesaban until it was abolished in 1999.

=== Special local administrative divisions ===
There are two special administrative regions within Thailand: Bangkok and Pattaya. The SAR is an autonomous region governed separately from the central government. The mayor of the SARs is elected directly by the citizen of their respective SARs. The SAR category is an exclusive administration category where the central government had to have a bill passed exclusively to make a city a SAR. Note that the degree of autonomy is different between these two SARs. Bangkok is recognized as its own polity while Pattaya is under the administration of Chonburi province. Bangkok has its own khaet-khwang system and Pattaya uses the tambon-muban system. This makes Pattaya closer to a thesaban nakhon than a SAR, still, it is classified as a SAR.

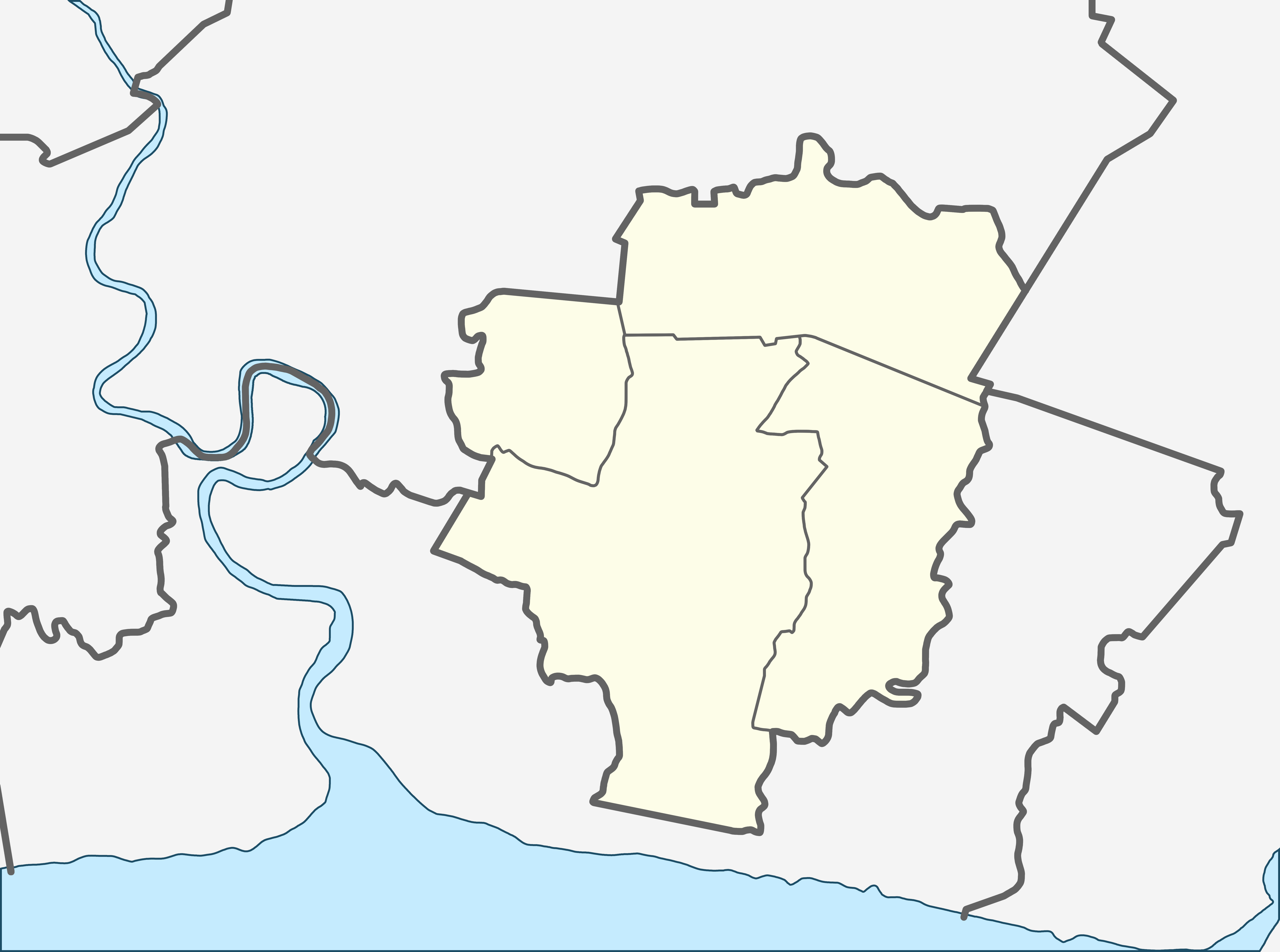
Nakhon Suvarnabhumi SAR

Currently, there are plans to make Chiang Mai and Mae Sot a special local administrative area. Though the plans for Chiang Mai is controversial due to the extreme centralization of the government. Especially within the parliament, conservatives called it separatism. A recent bill passed in 2005 and withdrawn in 2007 proposed a new province, Nakhon Suvarnabhumi, and was planned to be structured as a special local administrative area. As a result of a coup, the project was cancelled and withdrawn.

=== Khet and Khwang (special districts and sub-districts) ===
Districts and Sub-districts of Bangkok

Only used in Bangkok, the khet-khwang system acts similarly to the amphoe-tambon system, with the Bangkok government (not to be confused with the central Thai government) appointing the directors of these districts. There are 50 khet and 180 khwang within Bangkok.

== Informal administrative division ==
=== Krungthepmahanakhon lae Parimonthon (Bangkok Metropolitan Region) ===
Bangkok Metropolitan Area's Municipalities

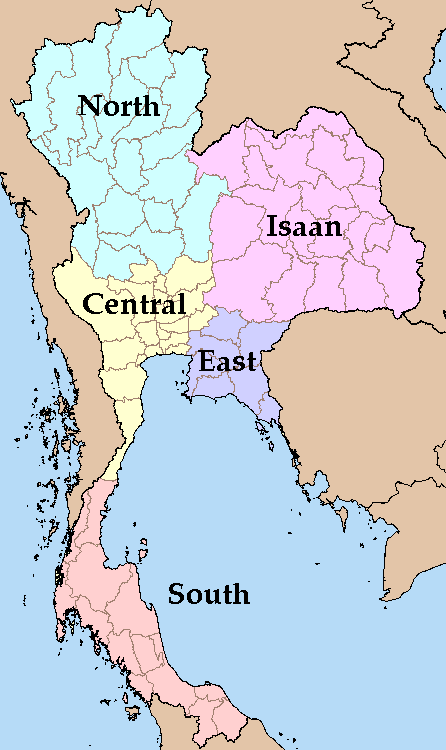
Thailand Regions

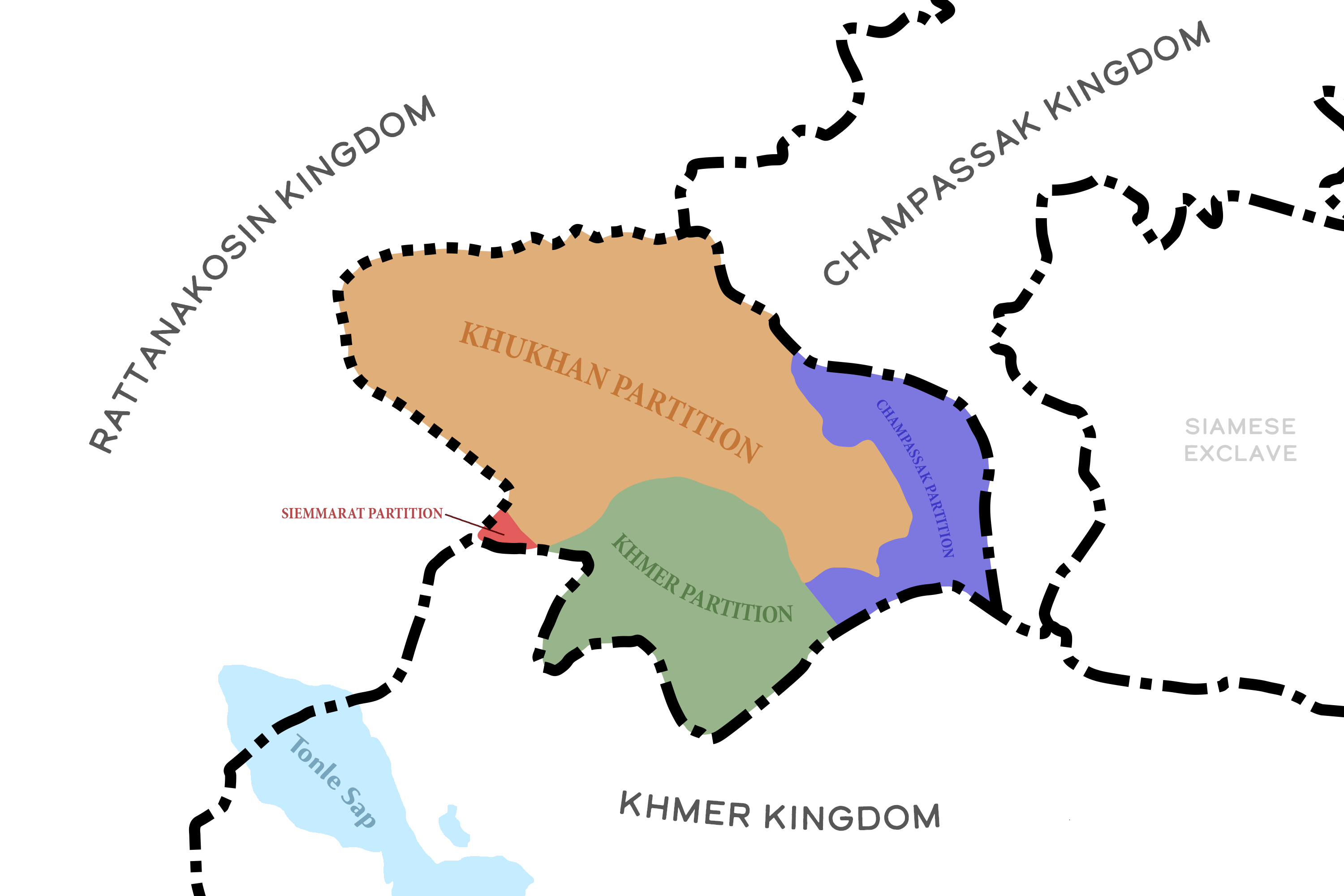
This map depicts the Region of Promthep in 1837, with the partition occurring in the 1840s.

Bangkok Metropolitan Region (Thai: กรุงเทพมหานครและปริมณฑล) refers to the surrounding provinces of Bangkok SAR. This division is used to refer to the whole Bangkok and its suburb. Since Bangkok has outgrown its own SAR borders, neighboring provinces’ city is being absorbed into the Bangkok metropolis, though retaining their respective local government. The polity is defined as Bangkok and the five surrounding provinces of Nakhon Pathom, Pathum Thani, Nonthaburi, Samut Prakan, and Samut Sakhon. This definition of Bangkok is commonly used in radio, news, and everyday life when people refer to Bangkok.

=== Phak (region) ===
Phak (Thai: ภาค) refers to the grouping of multiple provinces with regard to history, culture, and geography. There are ten types of phak divisions: 6-regions, 5-4-regions, meteorological, tourism, economic, highway, landlines, postal, electoral, and scouts. In everyday life, one would expect to be using the 4-regions system due to its simplicity and wide understanding of this system.

The four regions system is composed of:

- North
- Isan
- Central
- South

The northern region closely resembles the former Kingdom of Lanna. This kingdom was split into five minor kingdoms in the 1800s and fully absorbed into Siam. Owing to their cultural differences, people from the central plains discriminate against the people of the frontiers regions of Siam. This ingrained the division between us and them within the Siamese psyche.

The Isan region resembles the old territory annexed from the Kingdom of Vientiane and Champassak. The southern region resembles the former territories of the Malay sultanates and the Kingdom of Nakhon Si Thammarat.

==== Populations ====
Regions	Male	Female	Total
Central	10,984,989	11,857,239	22,842,228
Bangkok Metropolitan Area	5,126,677	5,745,423	10,872,100
Bangkok Special Administrative Area	2,592,292	2,935,702	5,527,994
Pattaya Special Administrative Area	47,773	50,598	98,372
North	5,871,707	6,138,317	12,010,024
Isan	10,814,540	11,012,380	21,826,920
South	4,667,882	4,824,385	9,492,267
Total	32,339,118	33,960,884	66,171,439

=== Unorganized Administrative Region ===
During the reign of Rama III, there was a massive settlement effort, in which many city and town were created during this time. This caused a "great reshuffling" of the provinces' territory. This ended up leading to the creation of the unorganized region of Promthep. This region was the result of the breaking up of the Kingdom of Cambodia's northern region and annexing it as a part of Siam. Later, this region was partitioned and merged into the Kingdom of Champassak, Kingdom of Cambodia, Khukhan and Siemmarat.

== Abolished administrative divisions ==
=== Monthon ===
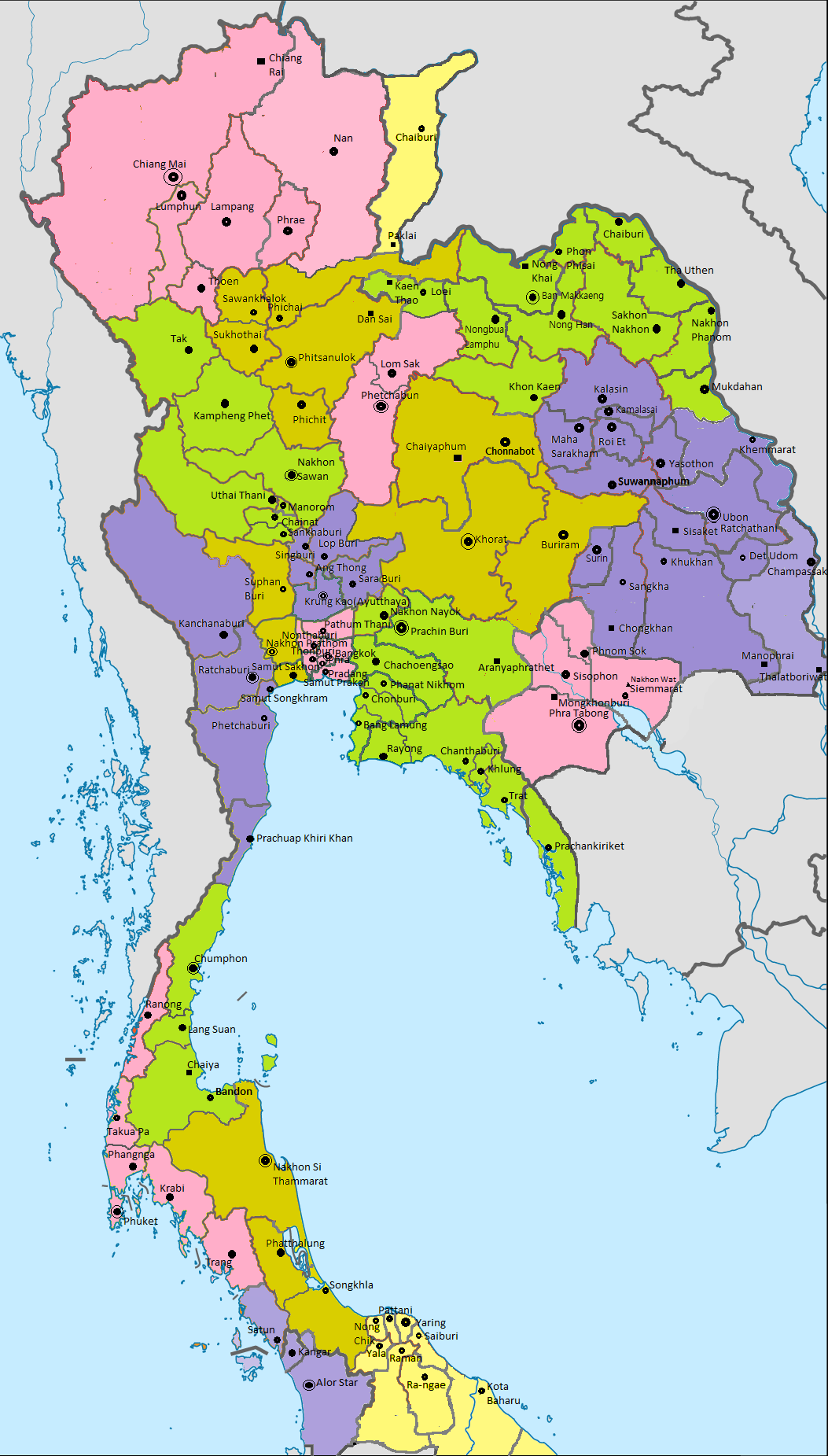
Monthon of 1900

Monthon (Thai: มณฑล) were administrative subdivisions of Thailand at the beginning of the 20th century. The Thai word monthon is a translation of the word mandala (maṇḍala, literally "circle"). The monthon were created as a part of the Thesaphiban (เทศาภิบาล, literally "local government") bureaucratic administrative system, introduced by Prince Damrong Rajanubhab which, together with the monthon, established step-by-step today's present provinces (changwat), districts (amphoe), and communes (tambon) throughout Thailand. Each monthon was led by a royal commissioner called Thesaphiban (เทศาภิบาล), later renamed to Samuhathesaphiban (สมุหเทศาภิบาล). The system was officially adopted by the 1897 Local Administration Act.

In 1915 there were 19 monthons containing 72 provinces. Due to economic problems, several monthon were merged in 1925. Monthon Phetchabun had been dissolved in 1915. Only 14 monthon remained: Ayutthaya, Bangkok (Krung Thep), Chanthaburi, Nakhon Chaisi, Nakhon Ratchasima, Nakhon Sawan, Nakhon Si Thammarat, Pattani, Phayap, Phitsanulok, Phuket, Prachinburi, Ratchaburi, and Udon Thani. In 1932 another four were abolished: Chanthaburi, Nakhon Chaisi, Nakhon Sawan, and Pattani. Finally in 1933 the whole monthon system was abolished by the Provincial Administration Act 2476 B.E./A.D. 1933, part of the changes made after the coup d'état, which changed from an absolute to a constitutional monarchy.

Monthon	มณฑล	Established	Fate
Lao Klang	ลาวกลาง	1890	1893 - renamed Monthon Nakhon Ratchasima
Lao Tawan Ok	ลาวตะวันออก	1890	1891 - merged with Monthon Lao Tawan Ok Chiang Nua becoming Monthon Lao Kao
Lao Tawan Ok Chiang Nua	ลาวตะวันออกเฉียงเหนือ	1890	1891 - merged with Monthon Lao Tawan Ok becoming Monthon Lao Kao
Lao Phuan	ลาวพวน	1890	1893 - renamed Monthon Udon after ceding the west bank of the Mekong.
Lao Kao	ลาวกาว	1891	1893 - renamed Monthon Isan
Lao Phung Khao	ลาวพุงขาว	1893	1893 - abolished, due to the annexation of territory to French Third Republic
Lao Chiang	ลาวเฉียง	1893	1900 - renamed into Monthon Tawan Ok Chiang Neua
Krung Kao	กรุงเก่า	1893	1933 - abolished, abolishment of the monthon system
Prachinburi	ปราจิณบุรี	1893	1933 - abolished, abolishment of the monthon system
Khamen	เขมร	1893	1899 - renamed Monthon Burapha
Nakhon Ratchasima	นครราชสีมา	1893	1933 - abolished, abolishment of the monthon system
Isan	อีสาน	1893	1912 - partitioned into Monthon Roi Et and Monthon Ubon
Phitsanulok	พิษณุโลก	1894	1933 - abolished, abolishment of the monthon system
Nakhon Sawan	นครสวรรค์	1895	1932 - merged into Monthon Krung Kao - Ayutthaya
Ratchaburi	ราชบุรี	1895	1933 - abolished, abolishment of the monthon system
Nakhon Chai Si	นครไชยศรี	1895	1932 - merged into Monthon Ratchaburi
Chumphon	ชุมพร	1896	1925 - merged into Monthon Nakhon Si Thammarat
Nakhon Si Thammarat	นครศรีธรรมราช	1896	1933 - abolished, abolishment of the monthon system
Syburi	ไทรบุรี	1897	1909 - abolished, due to the annexation of territory to British Empire
Krung Thep	กรุงเทพ	1897	1922 - merged into Monthon Krung Kao - Ayutthaya
Phuket	ภูเก็จ	1898	1933 - abolished, abolishment of the monthon system
Phetchabun	เพชรบูรณ์	1899 1907	1903 - merged into Monthon Phitsanulok 1916 - merged into Monthon Phitsanulok
Burapha	บูรพา	1899	1906 - abolished, due to the annexation of territory to French Third Republic
Tawan Ok Chiang Neua	ตะวันตกเฉียงเหนือ	1900	1901 - renamed into Monthon Phayap
Phayap	พายัพ	1901	1933 - abolished, abolishment of the monthon system
Udon	อุดร	1901	1933 - abolished, abolishment of the monthon system
Pattani	ปัตตานี	1906	1932 - merged into Monthon Nakhon Si Thammarat
Chanthaburi	จันทบุรี	1906	1933 - merged into Prachinburi
Roi Et	ร้อยเอ็จ	1912	1932 - merged into Nakhon Ratchasima
Ubon	อุบล	1912	1932 - merged into Nakhon Ratchasima
Maharat	มหาราษฎร์	1915	1926 - merged into Monthon Phayap

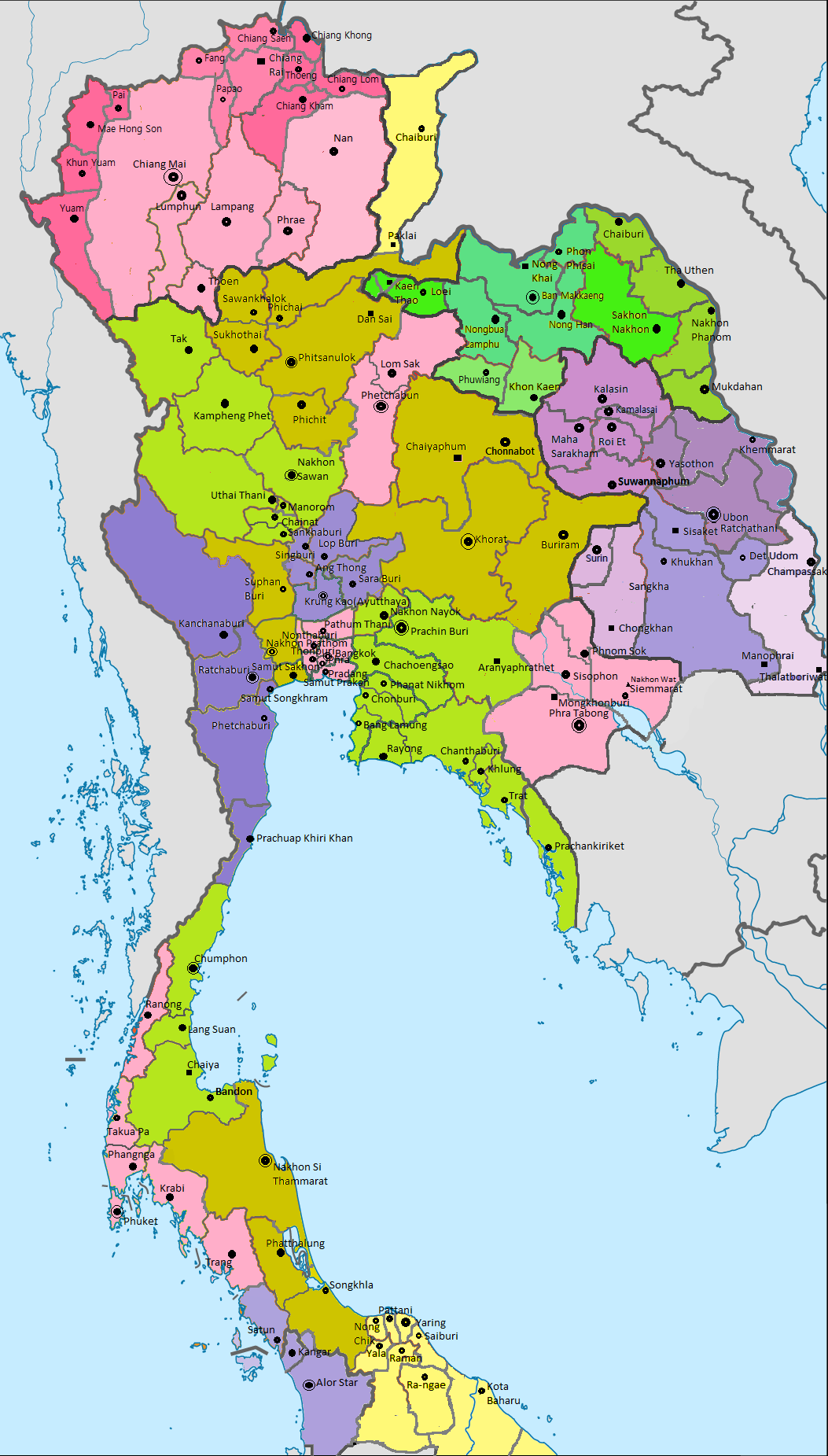
Boriwen Map

- Monthon Lao Chiang is the same as Monthon Phayap, to ease understanding in this table but in all cases, they are the same.
- Monthon Lao Kao which became Monthon Isan, and Monthon Lao Phuan which became Monthon Udon.
- The use of the name is up to interpretation and use on case-by-case basis, but name changes occurs due to Rama V integration policy of minorities and achieving assimilation.
- Province merger not shown, only monthon partition and merger are

=== Boriwen ===
Boriwen (Thai: บริเวณ) was created due to the size of the three largest monthon hence a subdivision of monthons. Several provinces were grouped together into one boriwen. In 1908 the boriwen were renamed to changwat, which became the name of provinces in 1916. The monthon with between three and five boriwen were Phayap, Udon Thani and Isan. Each boriwen was administered by a commissioner (khaluang boriwen, ข้าหลวงบริเวณ).

=== Sukhaphiban ===
Sukhaphiban (Thai: สุขาภิบาล) were administrative divisions of Thailand. Sukhaphiban were the first sub-autonomous entities established in Thailand. A first such district was created in Bangkok by a royal decree of King Chulalongkorn in 1897. Tha Chalom District became the second such district, created in 1906 and responsible for parts of Mueang Samut Sakhon District, Samut Sakhon Province.

In 1907 the act on operations of sanitary districts codified the regulations, and with the Local Administration Act of 1914 two levels of sukhaphiban were introduced, the sukhaphiban mueang for towns and sukhaphiban tambon for rural areas.

The number of sanitary districts grew to 35 in 1935, when these however were converted into municipalities (thesaban). New sanitary district were again established starting in 1952 by prime minister Phibun Songkhram. With the Act to Upgrade Sanitary Districts to Thesaban of May 1999 they were again abolished, and all became thesaban tambon.

=== Muang Prathetsarat ===
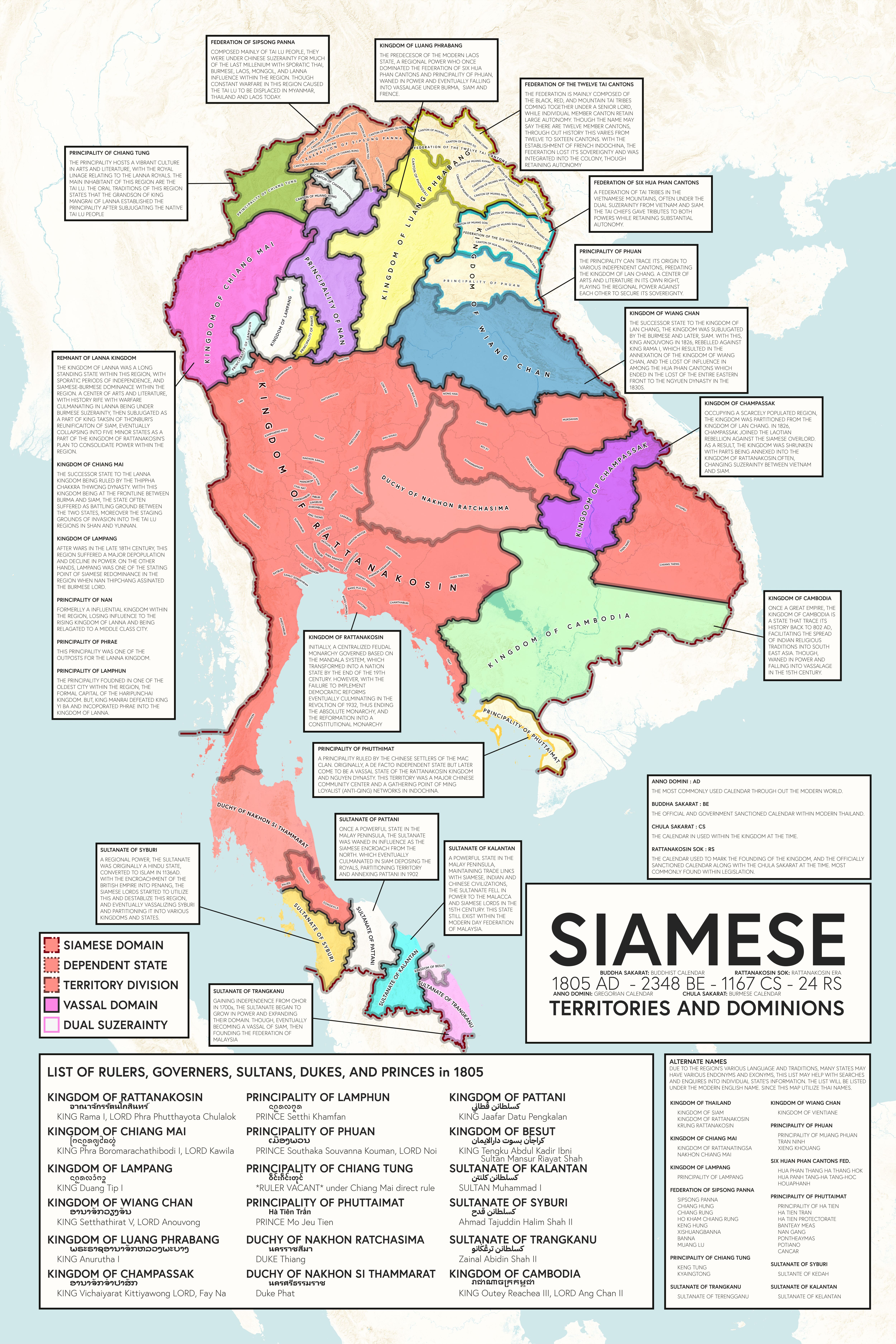
The maximum extent of the Kingdom of Rattanakosin's sphere of influence

Vassal states (Thai: เมืองประเทศราช) existed within Thailand for centuries since the founding of Sukhothai. Though not directly part of the country or even arguably an administrative division. Nonetheless, these states deserve a mention which is due to the fact that they are an entity within a certain polity.

Describing past vassals of Thailand requires the understanding of the mandala system. The mandala system is a largely diffused and dispersed power structure. This means that a vassal is largely independent to the central state, with the vassal also retaining sub-servient city-state-vassals. To explain this power structure, imagine if the United States is the central state, and Washington DC is the central state with 50 surrounding vassal states giving tributes to the central state and having open borders within these polities. These state-vassals also have subservient counties with autonomy in their internal affairs with these counties having their own autonomous sub-divisions. Thus, creating a pyramid of subservient cities and polities. It is not the current political structure of the United States due to the fact that the individual states could not just declare independence, which these vassal could, and had more autonomy from the central state. If the vassal states were to declare independence, it would incur the wrath of the central state. In history this was seen even when the Kingdom of Vientiane, a vassal, rebelled and lost which then was dissolved and absorbed into the central state.

The relationships between Thailand and its vassal varies over the centuries. It could be as amicable and the relationship that of the Kingdom of Nakhon Si Thammarat. Compared with the less amicable, aforementioned, Kingdom of Vientiane, which started a rebellion in 1826 under King Anouvong (Xaiya Setthathirath V). The last vassal state to be subservient to Thailand was the Malay states, which was subsequently dissolved, ceded, and merged into provinces and British Malaya in 1909, and the Kingdom of Champassak, which was downgraded into a province.

==== Constituent State of Sukhothai ====
To say that Sukhothai was a federative state was not inaccurate quote accurate per se. The history of Sukhothai goes back to the time when the city itself was led by Mons. The area found it self being refounded after its abandonment in the 8th century. At which point, King Abhayakamini founded the city again under the hagemony of Haripunchai. After that, during the reign of King Arunaraja of Si Satchanalai, not to be confused with King Anuraja of Singburi with a similar name, who led an independent Sukhothai-Si Satchanalai. The polity was then split into Sukhothai-Kamphaeng Phet and Si Satchanalai, but later was merged into Sukhothai-Si Satchanalai-Kamphaeng Phet. At which in 1238, King Kamonteng Ansi Inthrathibodinthrathit founded the Sukhothai Kingdom, where Si Satchanalay retained much of its autonomy, but Kamphaeng Phet at this point was reduced to a mere duchy-like polity with little autonomy.

Territories, Vassal States and Dependencies	Thai Name	Fate
Sukhothai City-state of Sukhothai	แคว้นสุโขทัย Khwaen Sukhothai	After Sukhothai was brought under Ayutthaya, Chaliang mostly lost influence and was religated as a third-class city, though it remained under Sukhothai's noble control, whom later go on to found the Sukhothai Dynasty within the Kingdom of Ayutthaya.
Si Satchanalai (Chaliang) City-state of Si Satchanalai	แคว้นเชลียง Khwaeng Chaliang	After Sukhothai was brought under Ayutthaya, Chaliang mostly lost influence and was religated as a third-class city, though it remained under Sukhothai's noble control, whom later go on to found the Sukhothai Dynasty within the Kingdom of Ayutthaya.

==== Constituent States of Ayutthaya ====
The Kingdom of Ayutthaya was founded on a merger between two main confederative states: Lavapura, and Suphannaphum. Thus, the polity operated more like a federation which gradually move towards a unitary state. The city of Ayutthaya was chosen as this new state's capital, even though Ayutthaya and Lopburi was already in a similar situation to this new state (Ayothaya and Lopburi was a federation in itself). This merger would led to a turmoil which would last for half a century where the Supannaphum dynasty would emerge victorious.

Territories, Vassal States and Dependencies	Thai Name	Period Under Suzerainty	Today Part of	Fate
Suphannaphum Confederation of Suphannaphum	แคว้นสุพรรณภูมิ Khwaen Suphannaphum	1351–1409	Thailand	King Somdet Phra Intharachathirat emerged victorious and abolished the federation, centralizing Ayutthaya into a proper feudal state
Ayothaya Sri Dvaravati City-State of Ayutthaya	ศรีอโยธิยาทวารวดี Ayutthaya Sri Thawarawadi	Capital Territory	Thailand	King Somdet Phra Intharachathirat emerged victorious and abolished the federation, centralizing Ayutthaya into a proper feudal state
Lavo Kingdom of Lavo	อาณาจักรละโว้ Anachak Lavo	1351–1409	Thailand	King Somdet Phra Intharachathirat emerged victorious and abolished the federation, centralizing Ayutthaya into a proper feudal state
Phripphri Kingdom of Phripphri	อาณาจักรพริบพรี Anachak Phripphri	directly dissolved and annexed into the capital territory		
Tavoy State of Tavoy	แคว้นทวาย Khwaen Thawai	1351-1564	Myanmar	Annexed by Toungoo Empire, never fully integrated
Tanaosi State of Tanaosi	แคว้นตะนาวศรี Khwaen Tanaosi	1351-1548	Myanmar	Annexed by Toungoo Empire, never fully integrated
Sukhothai Kingdom of Sukhothai	อาณาจักรสุโขทัย Anachak Sukhothai	1378–1438 (vassal) 1438–1529 (personal union) 1529–1569	Thailand	Brought under control by Borommarachathirat I, brought into a personal union, autonomy was gradually decreased until it is effectively a part of Ayutthaya.

==== Far Northern Frontier ====
Vassal States and Dependencies	Thai Name	Period Under Suzerainty		Today Part of	Fate
Keng Tung State Principality of Keng Tung	เมืองเชียงตุง Meuang Chiang Tung	1802–1812		Myanmar	Suzerainty lost to the Third Burmese Empire
Sipsong Panna Federation of 12 Thai Cantons: Canton of Hokamchenghung(นครเมืองหอคำเชียงรุ่ง); Canton of Je (นครเมืองแจ); Canton of Luang (นครเมืองลวง); Canton of Hon (นครเมืองหน); Canton of Hai (นครเมืองราย); Canton of Ngad (นครเมืองงาด); Canton of Lha (นครเมืองหล้า); Canton of Hing (นครเมืองฮิง); Canton of Chiang Neua (นครเมืองเชียงเหนือ); Canton of Ou Neua (นครเมืองอูเหนือ); Canton of Chiang Thong (เมืองเชียงทอง ); Canton of Phuthaen Luang (นครเมืองภูแถนหลวง)	สิบสองปันนา Sipsong Panna	1805–1812		Myanmar Laos China	Escaped suzerainty
Keng Lat State Canton of Chiang Lap	เมืองเชียงลาบ Muang Chiang Lab	1802–1812		Laos Myanmar	Suzerainty lost to the Third Burmese Empire
Keng Cheng State Principality of Chiang Khaeng	เชียงแขง Chiang Khaeng	1st	1802–1812	Myanmar	Suzerainty lost to the Third Burmese Empire
Keng Cheng State Principality of Chiang Khaeng	เชียงแขง Chiang Khaeng	2nd	1892–1893**	Myanmar	Suzerainty lost to the Third Burmese Empire

==== Northern Frontier ====
Vassal States and Dependencies	Thai Name	Period Under Suzerainty	Today Part of	Fate
Anachak Sukhothai Kingdom of Sukhothai	อาณาจักรสุโขทัย Anachak Sukhothai	1378–1438	Thailand	Annexed
Anachak Lan Na Kingdom of Lan Na	อาณาจักรล้านนา Anachak Lan Na	1602–1605	Thailand	Suzerainty lost to the Second Burmese Empire
Meuang Thoen Principality of Thoen	เมืองเถิน Meuang Thoen	1776-1915	Thailand	Merged with Lampang Principality
Rattana Tingsa Aphinawapuri Si Khuru Rattha Phra Nakhon Kingdom of Chiang Mai	นครเชียงใหม่ Nakhon Chiang Mai	1775–1939	Thailand	Downgraded to province
Nakhon Meuang Lampang Principality of Lampang	นครเมืองลำปาง Nakhon Meuang Lampang	1775–1922	Thailand	Downgraded to province
Nakhon Muang Nan Principality of Nan	นครเมืองน่าน Nakhon Meuang Nan	1775–1931	Thailand	Downgraded to province
Nakhon Lamphun Principality of Lamphun	นครลำพูน Nakhon Lamphun	1775–1926	Thailand	Downgraded to province
Meuang Phrae Principality of Phrae	เมืองแพร่ Meuang Phrae	1775–1902	Thailand	Downgraded to province
Muang Sua City-state of Sua	เมืองชวา Muang Chawa	c.1280s-c.1300s.	Laos	independence
Muang Wiang Chan City-state of Wiang Chan	เมืองจันทบุรี Muang Chanthaburi	c.1280s-c.1300s.	LaosThailand	independence

==== Southern Frontier ====
Vassal States and Dependencies	Thai Name	Period Under Suzerainty		Today Part of	Fate
Kingdom of Ligor Kingdom of Nakhon Si Thammarat	อาณาจักรนครศรีธรรมราช Anachak Nakhon Si Thammarat	1st	1238–1767	Thailand	Annexed
Kingdom of Ligor Kingdom of Nakhon Si Thammarat	อาณาจักรนครศรีธรรมราช Anachak Nakhon Si Thammarat	2nd	1769–1784	Thailand	Annexed
Kesultanan Kedah Sultanate of Kedah	อาณาจักรเกอดะฮ์ Anachak Koeda	1821–1909		Malaysia	Downgraded to province; Transferred to the British Empire
Kerajaan Setul Mambang Segara Kingdom of Setul Mambang Segara	ราชอาณาจักรเซอตุล Racha Anachak Seotun	1808–1909		Thailand	Downgraded to province
Perlis Indera Kayangan Kingdom of Perlis	อาณาจักรปะลิส Anachak Palit	1843–1909		Malaysia	Downgraded to province; Transferred to the British Empire
Kerajaan Kubang Pasu Darul Qiyam Kingdom of Kubang Pasu Darul Qiyam	อาณาจักรกุปังปาสู Anachak Kubang Pasu	1839–1864		Malaysia	Merged with Syburi (Kedah) province
Kesultanan Pattani Sultanate of Patani	อาณาจักรปัตตานี Anachak Pattani	1786–1902		ThailandMalaysia	Annexed; Partitioned; Pattani; Nong Chik; Yaring; Saiburi; Yala; Ra'Ngae; Kingdom of Reman
Kerajaan Reman Kingdom of Rahman	อาณาจักรรามัน Anachak Raman	1902-1909		ThailandMalaysia	Partitioned & Merged; Pattani; Narathiwat; Yala; Partly transferred to the British Empire
Kesultanan Terengganu Sultanate of Terengganu	อาณาจักรตรังกานู Anachak Trangkanu	1786–1909		Malaysia	Downgraded to province; Transferred to the British Empire
Kerajaan Besut Darul Iman Kingdom of Besut Darul Iman	อาณาจักเบอซุต Anachak Boesut	1780–1899		Malaysia	Annexed by the Sultanate of Terengganu
Kesultanan Kelantan Sultanate of Kelantan	อาณาจักรกลันตัน Anachak Klantan	1786–1909		Malaysia	Downgraded to province; Transferred to the British Empire

==== Eastern Frontier ====
Vassal States and Dependencies	Thai Name	Period Under Suzerainty		Today Part of	Fate
Krong Kampoucheathibtei Kingdom of Cambodia	อาณาจักรกัมพูชา Anachak Kampucha	1st	1594–1831	Cambodia	Suzerainty lost to Nguyen Dynasty; Transferred to the French Third Republic
Krong Kampoucheathibtei Kingdom of Cambodia	อาณาจักรกัมพูชา Anachak Kampucha	2nd	1845–1863	Cambodia	Suzerainty lost to Nguyen Dynasty; Transferred to the French Third Republic
Principality of Hà Tiên Ha Tien Protectorate	เมืองพุทไธมาศ Meuang Phutthaimat	1785–1809		VietnamCambodia	Suzerainty lost to Nguyen Dynasty
Muang Si Phum Principality of Si Phum	เมืองศรีภูมิ Muang Si Phum	1768–1772		Thailand	Annexed
Anachak Champassak Kingdom of Champasak	อาณาจักรจำปาศักดิ์ Anachak Champasak	1779–1904		LaosVietnam Cambodia	Downgraded to province
Muang Don Mot Daeng Principality of Don Mot Daeng	เมืองดอนมดแดง Muang Don Mot Daeng	1777-1778		Thailand	Annexed by the Kingdom of Champassak
Anachak Viengchan Kingdom of Vientiane	อาณาจักรเวียงจันทน์ Anachak Viengchan	1779–1828		LaosVietnam	Annexed as a result of the Lao Rebellion in 1826
Muang Phuan Principality of Phuan	เมืองพวน Muang Phuan	1779–1888		LaosVietnam	Transferred to the French Third Republic
Houa Phanh Than Ha Thang Hoc Federation of the Six Hua Phan Cantons: Canton of Hiam (เมืองเหียม); Canton of Son (เมืองซ่อน); Canton of Cham Neua (เมืองชำเหนือ); Canton of Cham Tay (เมืองชำใต้); Canton of Kho (เมืองเชียงฆอ); Canton of Sop'et (เมืองสบแอด); Canton of Hua Muang (เมืองหัวเมือง)	หัวพันทั้งห้าทั้งหก Hua Phan Thang Ha Thang Hok	1779–1888		LaosVietnam	Transferred to the French Third Republic
Anachak Luang Phrabang Kingdom of Luang Prabang	อาณาจักรหลวงพระบาง Anachak Luang Phrabang	1779–1893		LaosVietnam	Transferred to the French Third Republic
Muang Phongsali Principality of Phongsali	เมืองพงสาลี Muang Phongsali	1779–1893		LaosVietnam	Transferred to the French Third Republic
Sip Song Chau Tai Federation of the 12 Tai Cantons*: Canton of Lai (เมืองไล); Canton of Te (เมืองแต่); Canton of Jian (เมืองเจียน); Canton of Mun (เมืองมุน); Canton of Bang (เมืองบาง); Canton of Thaeng (เมืองแถง); Canton of Khwai (เมืองควาย); Canton of Dung (เมืองดุง); Canton of Muai (เมืองม่วย); Canton of La (เมืองลา); Canton on Moh (เมืองโมะ); Canton of Wat (เมืองหวัด); Canton of Sang (เมืองซาง); Canton of So (เมืองสอ); Canton of Than (เมืองถาน); Canton of Lo (เมืองลอ)	สิบสองจุไทย Sipsong Ju Thai	1st	1779–1806	LaosVietnam	Transferred to the French Third Republic
Sip Song Chau Tai Federation of the 12 Tai Cantons*: Canton of Lai (เมืองไล); Canton of Te (เมืองแต่); Canton of Jian (เมืองเจียน); Canton of Mun (เมืองมุน); Canton of Bang (เมืองบาง); Canton of Thaeng (เมืองแถง); Canton of Khwai (เมืองควาย); Canton of Dung (เมืองดุง); Canton of Muai (เมืองม่วย); Canton of La (เมืองลา); Canton on Moh (เมืองโมะ); Canton of Wat (เมืองหวัด); Canton of Sang (เมืองซาง); Canton of So (เมืองสอ); Canton of Than (เมืองถาน); Canton of Lo (เมืองลอ)	สิบสองจุไทย Sipsong Ju Thai	2nd	1835–1888	LaosVietnam	Transferred to the French Third Republic

==== Western Frontier ====
Vassal States and Dependencies	Thai Name	Period Under Suzerainty		Today Part of	Fate
Kingdom of Hongsarwatoi Kingdom of Hanthawaddy	อาณาจักรหงสาวดี Arnajak Hongsawadi	1st	1287–1298	Myanmar	Escaped suzerainty
Kingdom of Hongsarwatoi Kingdom of Hanthawaddy	อาณาจักรหงสาวดี Arnajak Hongsawadi	2nd	1307–1317	Myanmar	Escaped suzerainty
Kingdom of Hongsarwatoi Kingdom of Hanthawaddy	อาณาจักรหงสาวดี Arnajak Hongsawadi	3rd	1330	Myanmar	Escaped suzerainty

*Twelve Cantons were actually composed of twelve to sixteen different cantons. Note that throughout the centuries, different cantons held the same seats. The number of seats range from 12 to 16.

**Chiang Khaeng was merged with the Principality of Nan after the transfer.

=== Lost Territories ===
There are various territories which were partitioned and transferred to another political entity over the centuries. This could be either that the central government gave an order, or an independent action acted upon by the individual muang prathetsarat.

Map	Territory	เขตการปกครอง	Period Under Suzerainty	Fate	Today part of
	Salaween Territory	ดินแดนสาละวิน	1802–1892	Traded to Karenni State and Shan State, British Burma, gaining Chiang Khaeng.	Myanmar, Laos
	Chiang Khaeng Territory	ดินแดนเมืองเชียงแขง	1892–1893	Transferred to the French Third Republic	Myanmar
	Koh Song Territory	ดินแดนเกาะสอง	1769–1864	Ceded to the British Empire	Myanmar
	Miawdi Territory	ดินแดนเมียวดี	1768–1834	Gifted to the British Empire, from the Kingdom of Chiang Mai	Myanmar
	Mohtahmah Territory	ดินแดนเมาะตะมะ	1287–1548 1594–1613 1662	Ceded to the Toungoo Dynasty, regained Ceded to the Toungoo Dynasty, regained Ceded to the Konbaung Dynasty (Third Burmese Empire)	Myanmar
	Thawai Territory	ดินแดนทวาย	1287–1548 1593–1613 1662	Ceded to the Toungoo Dynasty, regained Ceded to the Toungoo Dynasty, regained Ceded to the Konbaung Dynasty (Third Burmese Empire)	Myanmar
	Tanaosi Territory	ดินแดนตะนาวสี	1287–1564 1593–1614 1756–1760	Ceded to the Toungoo Dynasty, regained Ceded to the Toungoo Dynasty, regained Ceded to the Konbaung Dynasty (Third Burmese Empire)	Myanmar

== Former administrative division maps ==

Rattanakosin administrative division in 1882 (Rama V)

Siamese administrative division in 1890 (Rama V)

Siamese administrative division in 1893 (Rama V)

Siamese administrative division in 1900 (Rama V)

Siamese monthon division in 1900 (Rama V)

Siamese administrative division in 1906 (Rama V)

Siamese administrative division in 1908 (Rama V)

Siamese administrative division in 1916 (Rama VI)

Siamese administrative division in 1932 (Rama VII)

Thai administrative division in 1939 (Rama VIII)

Thai administrative division in 1941 (Rama VIII)

Thai administrative division in 1945 (Rama VIII)

Thai administrative division in 1950 (Rama IX)

Thai administrative division in 1973 (Rama IX)

Thai administrative division in 2023 (Rama X)
