= Unfederated Malay States =

Former British protected states in the Malay Peninsula

Unfederated Malay States Negeri-Negeri Melayu Tidak Bersekutu (Malay)
- 1909–1942; 1942–1945 (Japanese occupation); 1945–1946
- Malaya in 1922: Unfederated Malay States Federated Malay States Straits Settlements
- Status: Protectorates of the British Empire
- Common languages: Malay (de facto official); English (lingua franca); Chinese; Tamil
- Religion: Sunni Islam; Christianity; Buddhism; Taoism (including Chinese folk religion); Hinduism
- Membership: Johor; Kedah; Kelantan; Perlis; Terengganu
- Government: Constitutional monarchy
- Monarch
  - 1909–1910 (first): Edward VII
  - 1936–1942; 1945–1946 (last): George VI
- Historical era: British Empire
  - Anglo-Siamese Treaty: 9 July 1909
  - Japanese occupation: 15 February 1942 – 2 September 1945
  - Japanese surrender: 2 September 1945
  - Malayan Union: 1 April 1946
- Currency: Straits dollar (1909–1939); Malayan dollar (1939–1942; 1945–1946)
Preceded by
1885: Johore
1909: Kedah
Kelantan
Perlis
Terengganu
Rattanakosin Kingdom
Succeeded by
1941-42: Japanese occupation of Malaya
1943: Si Rat Malai
1945: British Military Administration (Malaya)
1946: Malayan Union
- Today part of: Malaysia

"Unfederated Malay States" (Malay: Negeri-Negeri Melayu Tidak Bersekutu; Jawi: نݢري٢ ملايو تيدق برسکوتو) was the collective term for five distinct British protected states situated in the Malay Peninsula during the early to mid-twentieth century. These states were Johor, Kedah, Kelantan, Perlis and Terengganu. In contrast to the neighbouring Federated Malay States comprising Selangor, Perak, Pahang and Negeri Sembilan, the Unfederated Malay States did not share a unified administration or common institutions. Though they were nominally independent, each of them functioned as an individual protectorate under British oversight and were not recognised as a single entity in international law.

Following the conclusion of World War II, the British crown colony known as the Straits Settlements was formally de jure dissolved in 1946 (having been rendered de facto defunct with the Japanese occupation of Malaya and the Fall of Singapore in 1942). Penang and Malacca were subsequently combined with both the Unfederated and Federated Malay States to form the Malayan Union. Singapore was administratively separated and established as a standalone crown colony directly governed by the United Kingdom, independent of any Malayan political framework.

In response to widespread local opposition, the Malayan Union was restructured in 1948 into the Federation of Malaya, comprising eleven states. Of these, nine continued as British protected states, while Penang and Malacca remained crown colonies. The Federation of Malaya achieved full independence on 31 August 1957 and was later transformed into Malaysia on 16 September 1963 through the inclusion of Sarawak, Sabah and Singapore. Singapore was ultimately separated once more from Malaysia and became a sovereign state on 9 August 1965.

== History ==
Johor accepted a treaty of protection with the United Kingdom in 1885, and eventually succumbed to British pressure to accept a resident "Advisor" in 1914. Unlike the other Malay states under British protection, however, Johor remained outside of the Federated Malay States (formed in 1895).

Under the Bangkok Treaty of 1909, Siam transferred its rights over Kelantan, Terengganu, Kedah, and Perlis to the United Kingdom. These states then became British protected states. With the assistance of Japan, they temporarily returned to Thai jurisdiction for the latter part of World War II but was returned to Britain after the defeat and surrender of the Axis powers.

== Administration and language ==
The chief officer of the British colonial administration was the "Advisor". In contrast with the Federated Malay States, the Unfederated Malay States enjoyed greater autonomy. The de facto official language of the Unfederated Malay States was Malay (written with the Jawi script).

Evolution of Malaysia
