= Kingdom of Besut Darul Iman =

Historical Malay Kingdom on the Malay Peninsula (1780–1899)

Kingdom of Besut Darul Iman Kerajaan Besut Darul Iman (ms) كراجأن بسوت دارالايمان (jawi)
- 1780–1899
- Flag

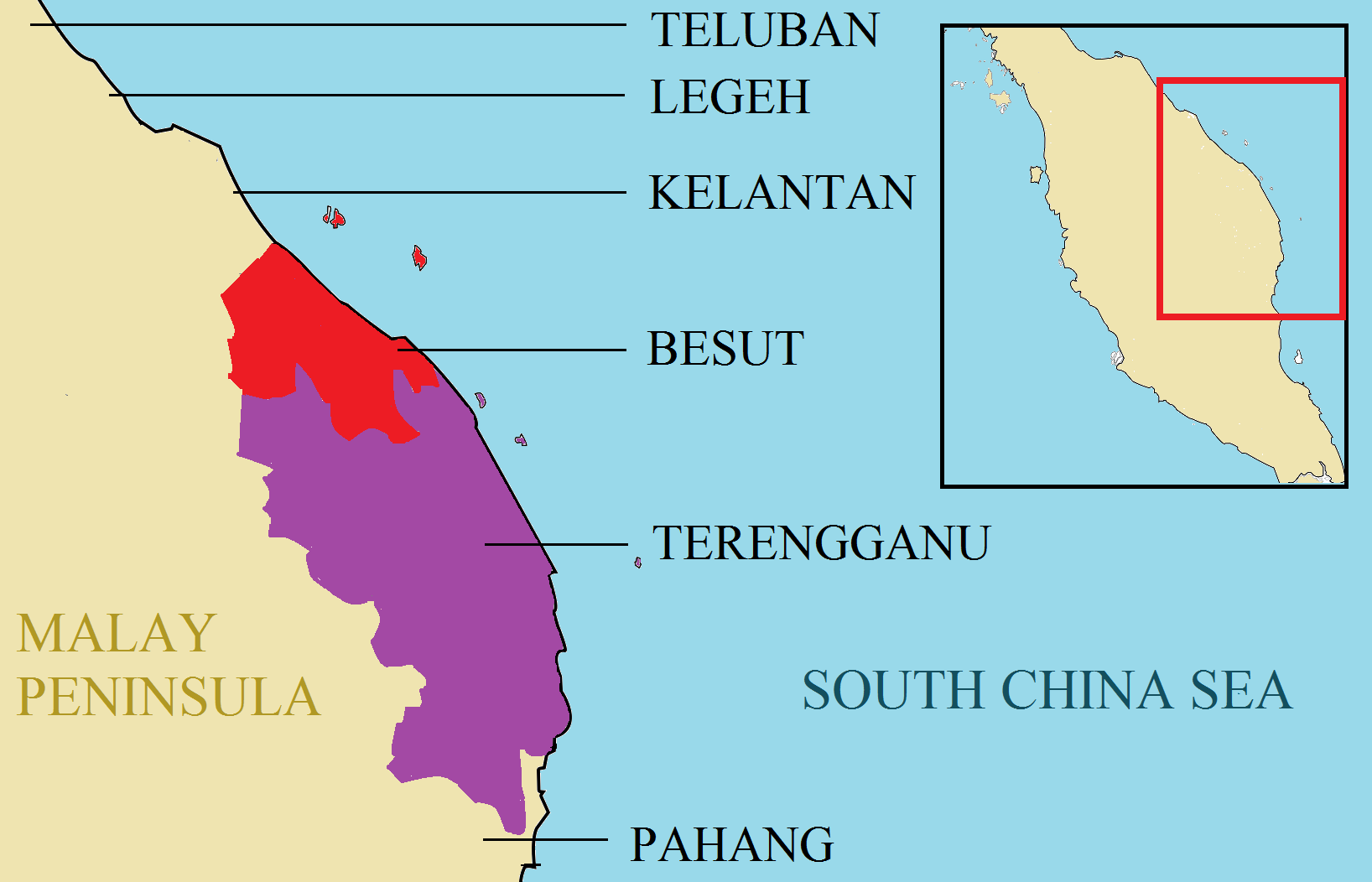
- Part of the northeast of Malay Peninsula in 1890, with the location of the Besut in Red, Terengganu in Purple and other neighbouring coastal Malay kingdoms in light brown.
- Status: Client state of Terengganu
- Capital: Kota Palembang (first); Kampung Raja (final)
- Common languages: Malay, Kelantan-Pattani Malay,
- Religion: Sunni Islam
- Government: Monarchy
- Raja
  - 1780–1835: Tengku Abdul Kadir bin al-Marhum Sultan Mansur Shah
  - 1836–1874: Tengku Ali bin Tengku Abdul Kadir
  - 1875–1881: Tengku Hitam bin Tengku Abdul Kadir
  - 1881–1882: Tengku Chik Tepok bin Tengku Hitam
  - 1882–1899: Tengku Ngah bin Tengku Hitam
- History
  - The foundation of Besut Darul Iman: 1780
  - Unification with Terengganu: 1899
Preceded by	Succeeded by
Patani Besar (D'Jembal Kelantan); Terengganu pre-sultanate (Johore)	Terengganu Sultanate; Unfederated Malay States
- Today part of: Malaysia

The Kingdom of Besut Darul Iman (Malay: Kerajaan Besut Darul Iman; Jawi:كراجأن بسوت دارالايمان) was a historical Malay Kingdom located in the northeastern coast of the Malay Peninsula, precursor of the present-day Besut District and most of Setiu, Terengganu. A principality of Terengganu, the state was established in 1780 following the crowning of a Terengganuan prince, Tengku Kadir as the Raja (King of) Besut. The House of Palembang, a cadet branch of Terengganu nobility continued to rule the territory before it was unified with Terengganu in 1899.

== History ==
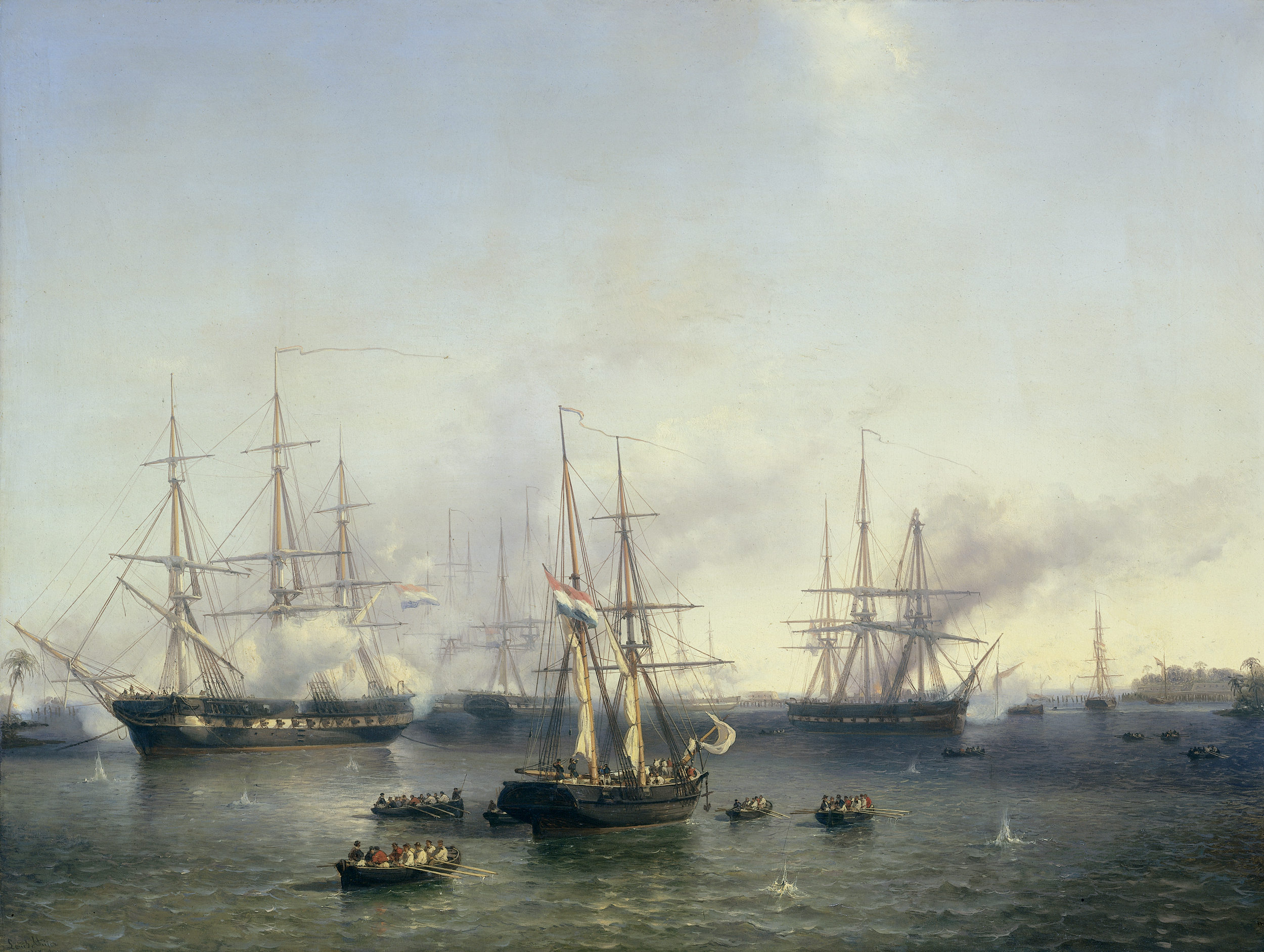
Dutch vessels during the fall of Palembang in 1850s. The settlement in Kota Palembang was named after the Sumatran town, pursuant to the place of origin many of the early pioneers.

=== Origin ===
Based on the narration by Kisah Pelayaran Abdullah ke Kelantan and Tuhfat al-Nafis, Besut was founded by a group of Pattani and Sumatran pilgrims led by Che Latif, a Palembangese chief. Upon their arrival, they were met by a group of indigenous Orang Asli community who had already settled in the area. To resolve this issue, Che Latif negotiated for a relocation program for the natives, he offered fishing equipments to the community as compensation for their transfer. The Orang Asli agreed to relinquish their rights on the territory and departed for Hulu Besut where they established new settlement in the hinterland.

Following the departure of the Orang Asli, Che Latiff and the pilgrims then constructed a settlement around the Besut riverbanks. The soil is suitable for rice-cultivation which the settler used for agriculture. The pilgrims also built a wharf to engage with regional trade network. The settlement was named Palembang, derived from their place of origin.

Upon the death of Che Latif, the local administration was then succeeded by his son, Che Kamat. It was during his time that Besut was severely plagued by the piratical activities originating from nearby islands. It was believed that the raiders were led by Panglima Ebeh and Panglima Garang. The local chief then decided to request aid from the Terengganu Sultanate to combat the sea bandits. The request was granted by Mansur I of Terengganu, with the army being mobilised into the territory led by Tengku Kadir, a Terengganese prince.

The campaign was proven to be successful with the piratical activities being near fully eradicated. The bandits were forced to retreat to Pulau Perhentian following their defeat. As a reward for incapacitating the piratical traffic, Tengku Kadir was then granted the crown of Besut, with the style of Raja Palembang (Besut), while Che Kamat was then elected as an Orang Besar, a local lord with administrative powers in Pulau Rhu.

In the wake of the establishment of the kingdom, the Raja then ordered the construction of forts along the Besut River, close to Kota Palembang. He then relocated the capital to Kampong Raja. His rule witnessed a period of relative calm and stability in the territory.

=== The Besut revolt ===
Tengku Ali ascended the throne as the second Raja Palembang following the death of Tengku Kadir in 1835. The reign of Tengku Ali witnessed the growing intervention pertaining to the domestic Besut administration from the Terengganuan central government. On 22 November 1876, the second Raja Palembang staged a revolt for independence against Terengganu rule. The armed conflict known as Perang Besut (The Besut War).

The revolt commenced during the absence of Tengku Ali at the time of the installation of Tengku Ahmad as the Yang Dipertuan Muda of Terengganu. In wake of the peculiar absence, the Sultan of Terengganu, Sultan Omar then mobilised his armed forces to Besut. On arrival, they were met by a Besut resistance movement led by Tengku Ali, who was supported by an assembly of Kelantanese militia ready to launch an attack.

Sultan Omar then petitioned his objection letter to the King of Siam and the Governor of Singgora, he also warned the Kelantanese government not to interfere with his dependencies. He then launched an 8,000-man army commanded by General Panglima Besar Orang Kaya Megat Seri Mahkota Raja (Wan Ab. Rahman bin Ali) to Besut. The General was assisted by Tengku Yusof Panglima Kedai Payang, Tengku Long bin Mustaffa (Tengku Long Pendekar) and Tengku Nik, while the commanders consist of Encik Musa, Datuk Bandar Jaafar, Tok Kaya Mahkota Haji Abdul Rahman and Tun Setia Wan Ismail Kampung Gedung.

The tactical control was planned by Engku Saiyed Seri Perdana (Engku Saiyed Zain bin Muhammad), who held the position equal as the prime minister of Terengganu. He drafted a plan for a severe cannon bombardment launched into the coast. The battle was successful which led to the retreat of Tengku Ali north to Kelantan where he lived in exile in the state until his death. Following the revolt, Besut was then governed by Tengku Ngah, appointed by the Sultan of Terengganu.

=== Besut succession crisis ===
The appointment of Tengku Ngah as the Raja of Besut was objected by Tengku Muda. Amidst the chaos ensured, Tengku Ngah abdicated from his position and elected his brother, Tengku Chik Haji as a successor. The crisis escalated into the division of Besut, with Tengku Muda ruled over Kampung Lampu, while Tengku Chik Haji has his jurisdiction in Kampong Raja. The severity of the crisis led the Sultan of Terengganu to arrive in Besut in order to reconcile the matter.

To resolve the conflict, the sultan took into consideration the geographical locations of the respective rulers. His verdict was in favour of Tengku Chik Haji as the King of Besut, due to his advantageous geographical location in Kampung Raja, compared to the western Kampung Lampu.

=== Post-war recovery and growth ===
The ratification of Tengku Chik Haji as the ruler of Besut ushered in a period of peace and stability in the area. He was awarded autonomous power equal to a local sovereign to preside over criminal trials. He also received taxation rights over the land. It was also during his rule that Besut witnessed the role of Islam continuing to flourish in the area with the establishment of religious institutions, various waqfs, police stations, among other. The palatial residence, built during his reign in 1878 still stands today.

The last king in the Royal House of Palembang was Tengku Ngah. He was known to be a reserved, but a caring leader towards his subjects in Palembang and Kampung Raja. He managed to continue the development projects in Besut parallel to the reign of presiding Tengku Chik Haji. It was recorded that the Royal Commissioner from Terengganu often visited the town to obtain materials for the Bunga Mas tribute procession to Bangkok. He ruled Besut for 19 years until his death in 1899.

=== Reunification ===
The death of Tengku Ngah marks the end of the royal institution in Besut. Since Tengku Ngah died without appointing an heir, the local administration was then inherited to Tengku Long (Tengku Seri Indera Segera) in 1899, a member of the Palembang-Besut Dynasty. He acquired the position as a Royal Commissioner of Terengganu, instead of the earlier Kingship title as his predecessors. Following the demise of Tengku Long, Besut was directly ruled from Terengganu with the subsequent Royal Commissioners were not of the Palembangese lineage.

== Rulers of Palembang–Besut, 1780–1899 ==
Throughout its history, Besut was ruled by the descendants of Tengku Abdul Kadir, the progenitor of the House of Palembang (Besut).

Raja (The King of) Palembang-Besut	In office
Tengku Abdul Kadir ibni Sultan Mansur Riayat Syah	1780–1835
Tengku Ali bin Tengku Abdul Kadir	1836–1874
Tengku Hitam bin Tengku Abdul Kadir	1875–1881
Tengku Cik Tepok bin Tengku Abdul Kadir	1881–1882
Tengku Ngah bin Tengku Hitam	1882–1899

== Bibliography ==
- Pulau Perhentian (2017), Sejarah Daerah Besut, Anjung
- Manirah Othman (2009), Istana Masa Kecil, Kosmo, archived from the original on 7 November 2017
- Kuala Terengganu Post (2017), Besut Sebuah Negara, Itu Hanya Tinggal Sejarah, Kuala Terengganu Post, archived from the original on 7 November 2017
- Utusan Malaysia (1998), "Besut dalam lipatan sejarah", Utusan Malaysia, archived from the original on 5 March 2016
- Arung (2012), Tengku Yusuf Panglima menyertai Peperangan Besut 1875, Arung Bugis
- Ganupedia (2017), Peperangan Besut, Ensikopledia Terengganu, archived from the original on 23 February 2020
- Syazwan Safwan (2010), Sejarah Besut, negeri beraja satu masa lalu., Alami Terengganu
- World of Royalty (2017), Terengganu, archived from the original on 7 December 2019
