= Mueang Soi =

Former city-state in Northern Thailand

Coordinates: 17°28′17″N 98°41′13″E

Mueang Soi เมืองสร้อย (Thai)
- 1126–1600s or 1767
- Mueang Soi and its neighboring polities in the 11th century
- Capital: Soi Sri Suk
- Common languages: Northern Thai
- Religion: Theravada Buddhism
- Government: City state
- Monarch
  - Unknown (first): Phaya Patummarat
  - Unknown (last): Phaya Uttum
- Historical era: Post-classical
  - First mentioned in local chronicle: 1126
  - Fall of Haripuñjaya: 1281
  - Royal intermarriage with Li: 1300s
  - Fall of Mueang Soi: 1600s or 1767
Preceded by	Succeeded by
Haripuñjaya	Ayutthaya

Mueang Soi (Thai: เมืองสร้อย) was a city-state of the Lawa people on the boundary of the present-day Tak province and Lamphun province of Thailand. It may have existed at least from 1126 to the 16th or 18th century when it was destroyed by Burmese or Siamese armies.

The ruins of Mueang Soi have been submerged since 1964 due to the operation of the Bhumibol Dam.

== History ==
Before the establishment of the Lan Na Kingdom, the northern region of Thailand was dotted with small city-states scattered along the plains of major rivers. Each state had its king and had its own unique local culture, depending on the local potential. Records on Mueang Soi has been proved its existence during 1126–1767. Its territory covered lower Mae Tuen (แม่ตื่น) and Ping River Basins in the present-day Sam Ngao district, Tak province.

Mueang Soi was built by Phaya Patummarat (พยาปาตุมมะราช). In the 14th century, Chao New Mue Ngam (เจ้านิ้วมืองาม), King of the neighboring city-state of Li, also enthroned as the king of Mueang Soi. This possibly due to the royal intermarriage.

Mueang Soi was destroyed by the Burmese troops and left abandoned in the 18th century due to the Burmese–Siamese wars. Its last ruler was Phaya Uttum (พญาอุตตุม). However, some scholars state Mueang Soi was destroyed earlier during the siege of Lan Na by King Naresuan of the Ayutthaya Kingdom in the late 16th century; Mueang Soi was then an Ayutthaya's vassal.
