= Phu Khiao district =

Phu Khiao ภูเขียว
- District
- District location in Chaiyaphum province
- Coordinates: 16°22′35″N 102°7′43″E
- Country: Thailand
- Province: Chaiyaphum
- Seat: Phak Pang

Area
  - Total: 801.8 km^{2} (309.6 sq mi)

Population (2000)
  - Total: 120,792
  - Density: 150.7/km^{2} (390/sq mi)
- Time zone: UTC+7 (ICT)
- Postal code: 36110
- Geocode: 3610

Phu Khiao (Thai: ภูเขียว, pronounced [pʰūː kʰǐaw], Northeastern Thai: ภูเขียว; pronounced [pʰûː kʰǐaw]) is a district (amphoe) in the northern part of Chaiyaphum province, northeastern Thailand.

== History ==
Phu Khiao was a city (mueang) in the early years of the Rattanakosin Kingdom era at the end of the 18th century. The center of the city was in Ban Mueang Kao (which now is in Kaset Sombun district). The governor was Phraya Krai Singhanat. When the city grew, Phraya Krai Singhanat (Ruecha) moved the center of the city to Ban Kut Chueak. His son, the next governor Phraya Krai Singhanat (Bunma), was promoted by the government in Bangkok to be Phraya Phakdi Ruechai Changwang. Again he moved the city center to Ban Non Salao.

During the Thesaphiban administrative reforms Mueang Phu Khiao was downgraded to be a district of Chaiyaphum province in 1899.

It was later renamed Phak Pang after the central tambon, and changed back to Phu Khiao in 1939.

== Geography ==
Neighboring districts are (from the north clockwise): Chum Phae of Khon Kaen province; Ban Thaen, Kaeng Khro, Kaset Sombun, and Khon San of Chaiyaphum Province.

== Administration ==
The district is divided into 11 sub-districts (tambons).

1.	Phak Pang	ผักปัง
2.	Kwang Chon	กวางโจน
3.	Nong Khon Thai	หนองคอนไทย
4.	Ban Kaeng	บ้านแก้ง
5.	Kut Yom	กุดยม
6.	Ban Phet	บ้านเพชร
7.	Khok Sa-at	โคกสะอาด
8.	Nong Tum	หนองตูม
9.	O Lo	โอโล
10.	That Thong	ธาตุทอง
11.	Ban Don	บ้านดอน
