= Yên Châu district =

Coordinates: 21.500°N 104.333°E

Yên Châu district Huyện Yên Châu
- District
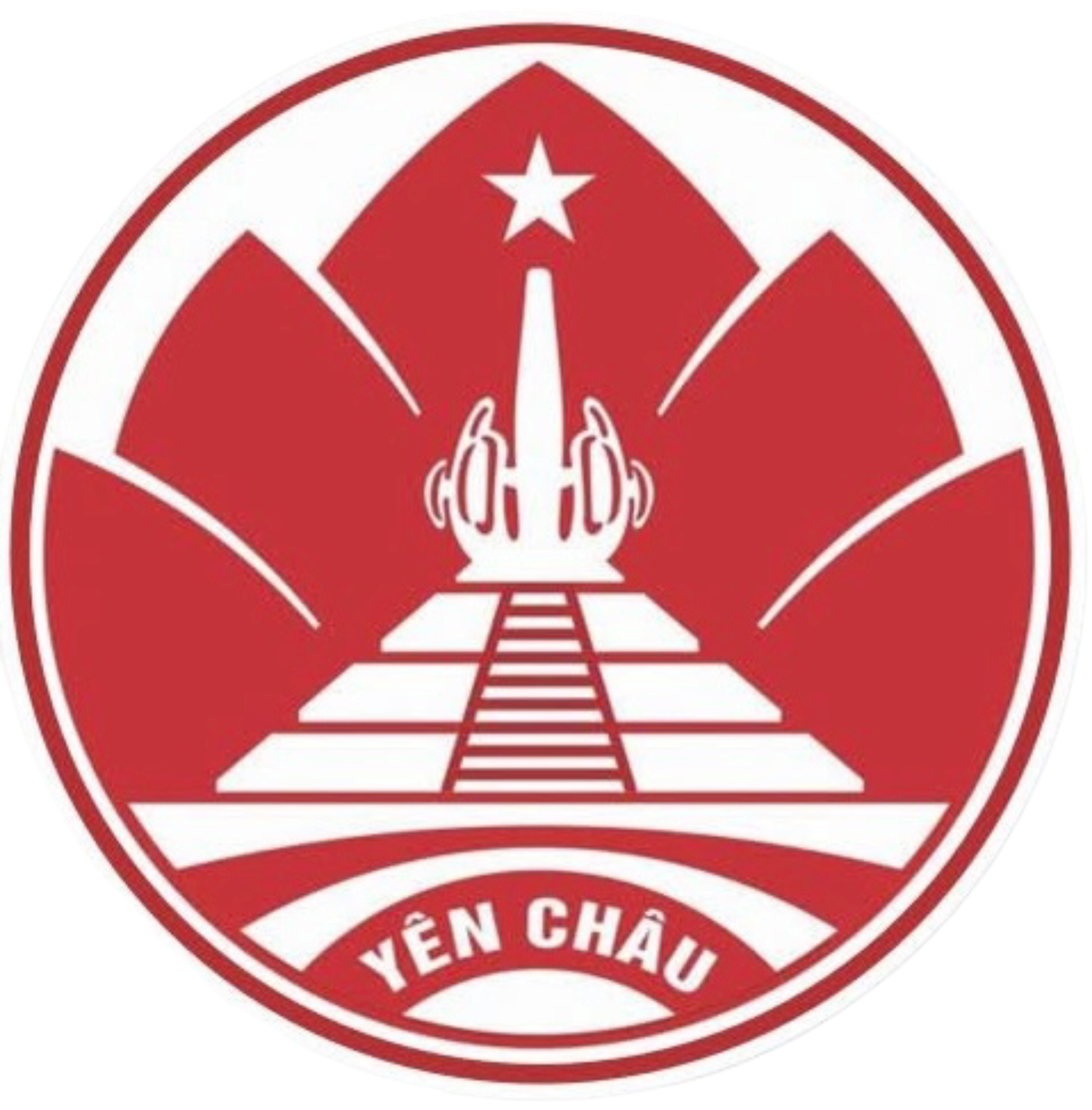
- Seal
- Interactive map of Yên Châu district
- Country: Vietnam
- Region: Northwest
- Province: Sơn La
- Capital: Yên Châu

Area
  - Total: 326 sq mi (844 km^{2})

Population (2019 census)
  - Total: 79,295
  - Density: 243/sq mi (94.0/km^{2})
- Time zone: UTC+7 (UTC + 7)

Yên Châu is a former district (huyện) of Sơn La province in the Northwest region of Vietnam. As of 2019 the district had a population of 79,295. The district covers an area of 844 km^{2}. The district capital is the eponymous Yên Châu.

== Climate ==
Climate data for Yên Châu
Month	Jan	Feb	Mar	Apr	May	Jun	Jul	Aug	Sep	Oct	Nov	Dec	Year
Record high °C (°F)	35.2 (95.4)	37.3 (99.1)	39.3 (102.7)	42.4 (108.3)	42.0 (107.6)	39.9 (103.8)	39.5 (103.1)	38.4 (101.1)	37.9 (100.2)	38.3 (100.9)	36.2 (97.2)	34.4 (93.9)	42.4 (108.3)
Mean daily maximum °C (°F)	23.0 (73.4)	25.3 (77.5)	29.0 (84.2)	32.3 (90.1)	33.5 (92.3)	33.0 (91.4)	32.5 (90.5)	32.0 (89.6)	31.2 (88.2)	29.2 (84.6)	26.5 (79.7)	23.8 (74.8)	29.3 (84.7)
Daily mean °C (°F)	16.5 (61.7)	18.6 (65.5)	22.1 (71.8)	25.2 (77.4)	26.9 (80.4)	27.3 (81.1)	27.1 (80.8)	26.7 (80.1)	25.6 (78.1)	23.3 (73.9)	20.0 (68.0)	16.9 (62.4)	23.0 (73.4)
Mean daily minimum °C (°F)	12.5 (54.5)	14.3 (57.7)	17.4 (63.3)	20.4 (68.7)	22.6 (72.7)	23.8 (74.8)	23.8 (74.8)	23.5 (74.3)	22.2 (72.0)	19.8 (67.6)	16.1 (61.0)	12.6 (54.7)	19.1 (66.4)
Record low °C (°F)	−1.5 (29.3)	3.5 (38.3)	5.3 (41.5)	9.2 (48.6)	15.7 (60.3)	16.0 (60.8)	18.3 (64.9)	20.3 (68.5)	14.9 (58.8)	8.8 (47.8)	3.7 (38.7)	−0.4 (31.3)	−1.5 (29.3)
Average rainfall mm (inches)	13.0 (0.51)	14.6 (0.57)	34.6 (1.36)	103.3 (4.07)	152.9 (6.02)	191.9 (7.56)	220.5 (8.68)	252.8 (9.95)	144.1 (5.67)	56.6 (2.23)	19.6 (0.77)	11.7 (0.46)	1,215.3 (47.85)
Average rainy days	3.0	2.9	5.3	11.6	14.8	16.4	18.2	17.8	11.4	7.4	4.0	2.3	115.2
Average relative humidity (%)	76.7	74.0	72.1	73.8	76.1	80.8	83.2	84.7	83.7	81.3	79.6	78.4	79.6
Mean monthly sunshine hours	134.3	136.5	159.6	180.4	201.8	154.9	160.7	162.2	169.2	155.0	146.3	147.8	1,906
Source: Vietnam Institute for Building Science and Technology
