= Si Rat Malai =

Former administrative division of Thailand in Malaya

Coordinates: 6°30′N 100°30′E

Si Rat Malai สี่รัฐมาลัย
- Subdivision of Thailand
- 1943–1945
- Flag Coat of arms

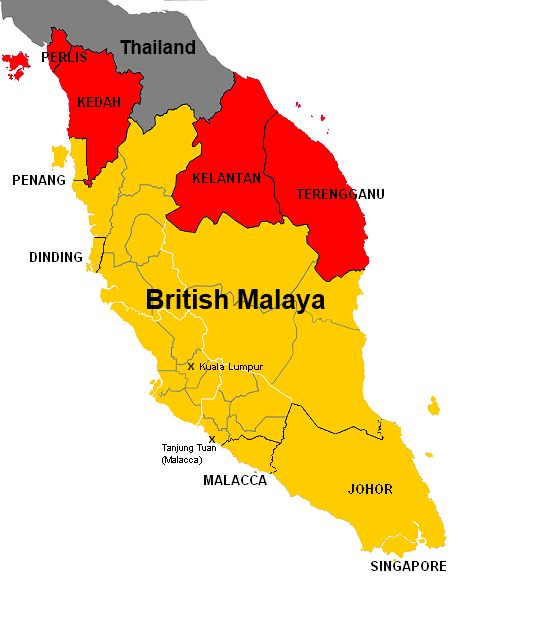
- Thai occupation zones (Si Rat Malai) Japanese occupation zones

Anthem
- เพลงชาติไทย; Phleng Chat Thai "Thai National Anthem"
- Capital: Alor Setar
- Area
  - 1943: 38,382 km^{2} (14,819 sq mi)
- Historical era: World War II
  - Japan hands over the four states to Thailand: 18 October 1943
  - Thailand returns annexed territories to the United Kingdom: 2 September 1945
Preceded by	Succeeded by
Japanese occupation of Malaya	British Military Administration (Malaya)
- Today part of: Malaysia

Si Rat Malai (Thai: สี่รัฐมาลัย, lit. 'Four Malay States') was a former administrative division of Thailand. It included the four northern states of Kedah, Perlis, Kelantan, and Terengganu in British Malaya annexed by the Axis-aligned Thai government after the Japanese invasion of Malaya.

The Thai authorities made Alor Setar the centre for the administration of the territory. Thailand administered the states as Syburi (ไทรบุรี), Palit (ปะลิส), Kalantan (กลันตัน) and Trangkanu (ตรังกานู) provinces from 18 October 1943 until the surrender of the Japanese at the end of the war.

== History ==
On 14 December 1941, General Plaek Phibunsongkhram, then Prime Minister of Thailand, signed a secret agreement with the Empire of Japan and committed the Thai armed forces to participate in the planned Burma Campaign. An alliance between Thailand and Japan was formally signed on 21 December 1941.

On 25 January 1942, the Thai government, believing the Allies to be beaten, declared war on the United States and the United Kingdom. As a reward for entering into a military alliance with the Japanese, the latter agreed to return to Thailand the four British Malayan protectorates of Kedah, Perlis, Kelantan, and Terengganu which had been turned into British protectorates under the Anglo-Siamese Treaty of 1909.

After occupation on 20 August 1943, an agreement on the surrender of the four states was signed in Bangkok, between Phibunsongkhram and the Japanese ambassador, Teiji Tsubokami. Among the conditions in the agreement stated that Japan would hand over the administration of the four Malay states to Thailand within 60 days after the signature of the document.

On 18 October 1943, the four Malay states were transferred to Thailand. On the occasion, Prime Minister Phibunsongkhram declared that the citizens of the annexed states were to be granted equal treatment to the inhabitants of other parts of Thailand. The Japanese authorities, however, retained a great degree of control. Japanese troops and the Kempeitai continued to be stationed in the four states. Rail services would be run by Thai officers only in Kelantan, and the rail links in Kedah and Perlis would remain in Japanese hands. The Japanese also had the full control of the telegraph, post and telephone services over the nominally Thai territories.

Thailand was still allied with Japan when the war ended, but the United States proposed a solution. In September 1945, British control of the four states was reinstated, under the British Military Administration. On 1 April 1946 the former Thai-occupied states joined the Malayan Union.

== Administration ==
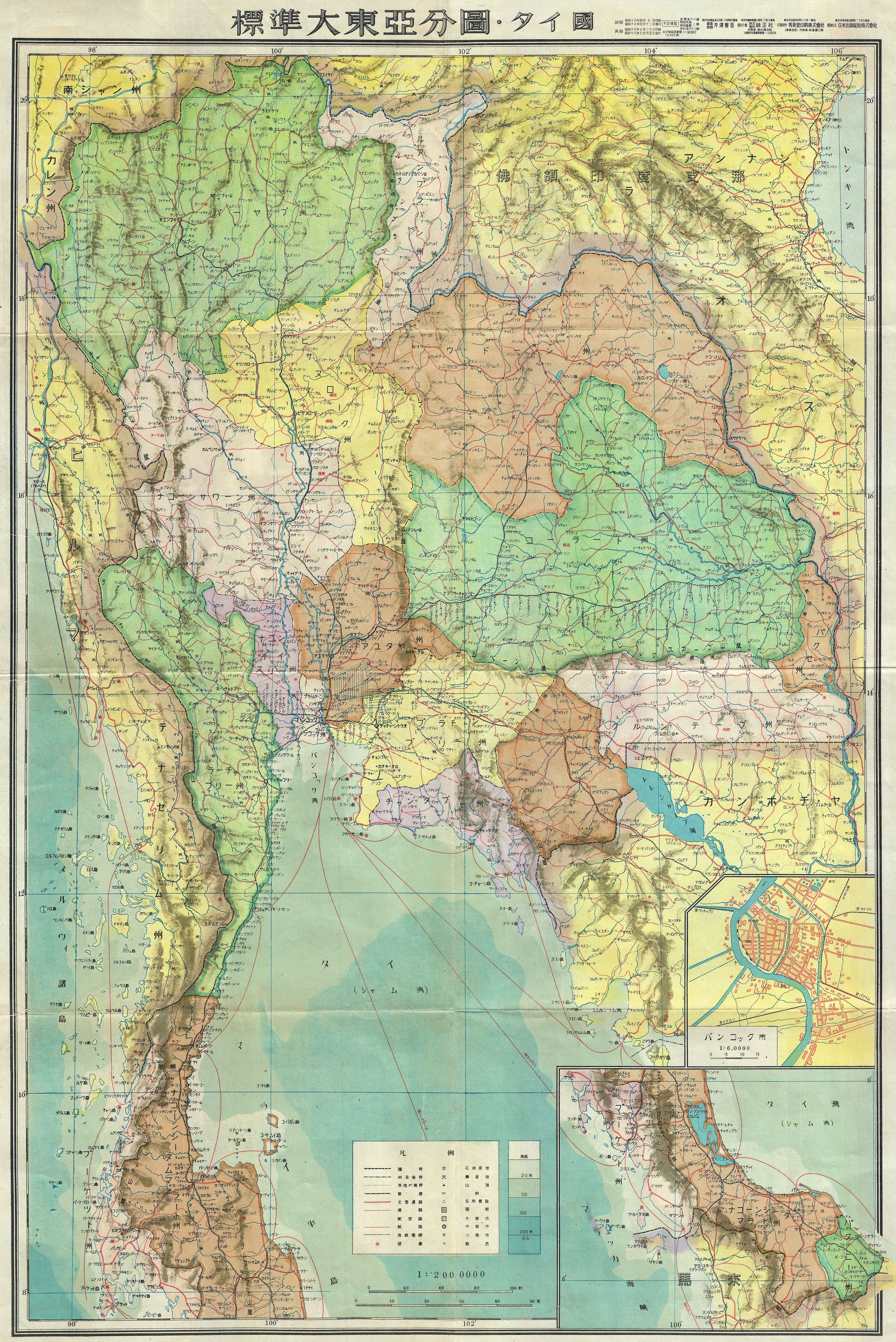
Map of Thailand during World War II in Japanese, 1943

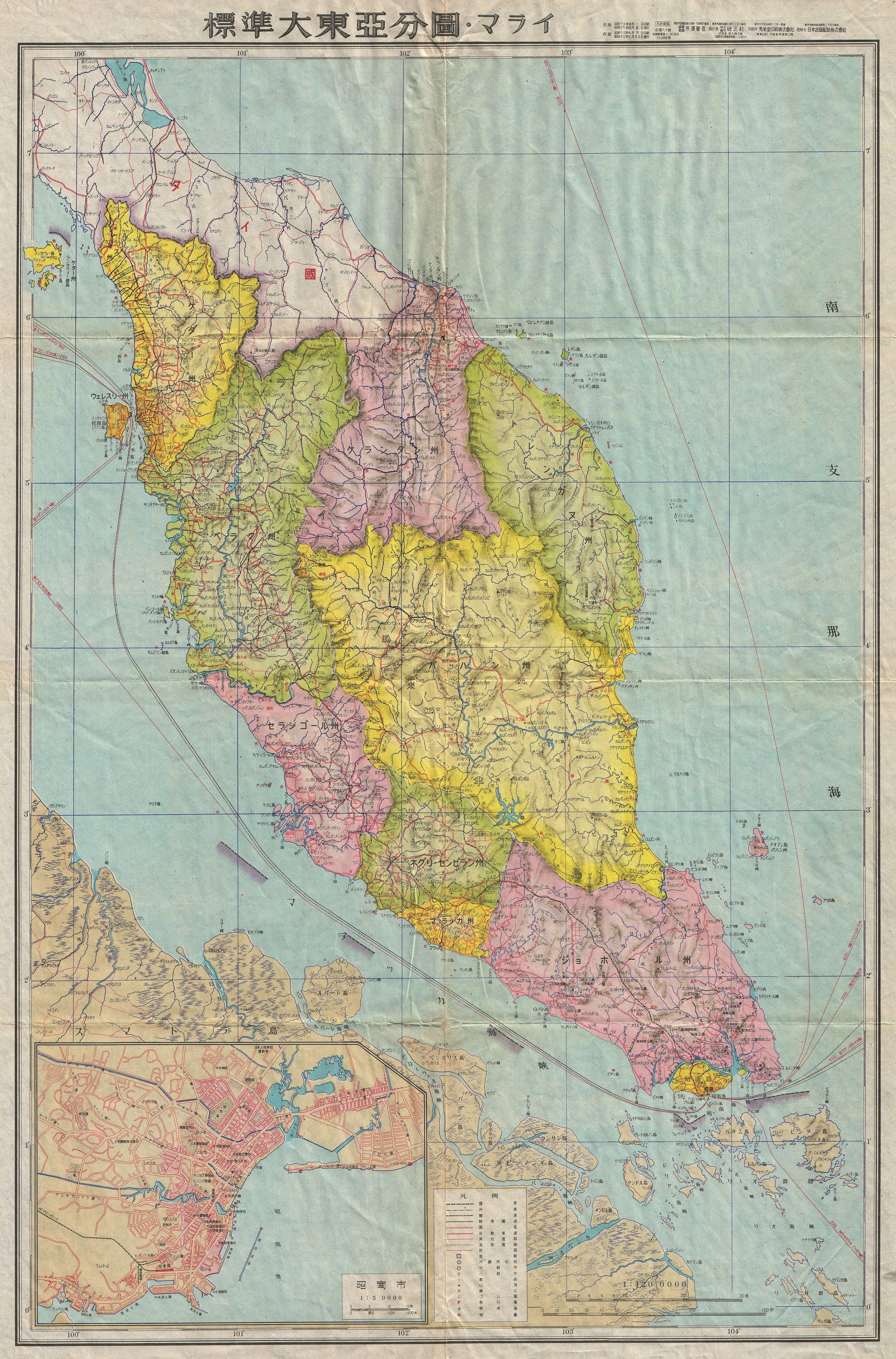
1942 Japanese map of the Malay Peninsula

The Thai administrative service in the northern Malay states was relatively small, and the officers were more concentrated in carrying out military and police duties and foreign relations.

The administrative service was carried out by civil servants who were under military supervision.

=== Kedah ===
==== Japanese Governors ====
- 1941 – Mar 1942 Ojama
- Mar 1942 – Oct 1943 Sukegawa Seiji (Seichi)

==== Thai Military Commissioner ====
- Oct 1943 – 1945? Pramote Chongcharoen

==== Thai General-commissioners ====
Administering Kedah, Kelantan and Terengganu:

- 20 August 1943 – Oct 1943 Kamol Saraphaisariddhikan Chotikasathian
- Oct 1943 – 1945? Chierlah Kamol Sribhaasairadhikavan Josikasarthien

=== Kelantan ===
==== Japanese Governors ====
- 1941 – 1943 Yasushi Sunakawan
- 1943 – 20 August 1943 Kikura Fujisawa

==== Thai Military Commissioners ====
- 1943 – 1944 Charu Chaichan
- 1944 – 1945 Tharin Rawang Phu

=== Terengganu ===
==== Japanese Governors ====
- Dec 1941 – 18 March 1942 ....
- 18 March 1942 – Jul 1943 Manabu Kuji

==== Thai Military Commissioner ====
- 20 August 1943 – Aug 1945 Prayoon Ratanakit

=== Perlis ===
==== Japanese Governors ====
- 1941 – 1942 Ohyama Kikancho
- Mar 1942 – 20 August 1943 Sukegawa Seiji (Osagawa)

==== Thai Military Commissioner ====
- 20 August 1943 – 8 September 1945 Charn Na Song Khram

== See also ==
- Anglo-Siamese Treaty of 1909
- Japanese occupation of Malaya
- Thailand in World War II
