= Anglo-Siamese Treaty of 1909 =

Thailand-British Malaysia treaty

Bangkok Treaty
- Context: Transfer of Kelantan, Terengganu, Kedah and Perlis to the United Kingdom of Great Britain and Ireland.; Britain recognised Siamese sovereignty over Pattani
- Signed: 10 March 1909; 117 years ago
- Location: Bangkok
- Effective: 9 July 1909; 117 years ago
- Signatories: Devawongse Varopakarn; Sir Ralph Paget
- Parties: Siam; United Kingdom
- Language: English

The Anglo-Siamese Treaty of 1909, also known as the Bangkok Treaty of 1909, was an agreement between the United Kingdom and the Kingdom of Siam (now Thailand). It was signed on 10 March 1909 in Bangkok, with ratifications exchanged in London on 9 July 1909. The treaty established the modern border between Malaysia and Thailand. Areas around modern Pattani, Narathiwat, southern Songkhla, Satun and Yala remained under Thai control, later becoming the site of the South Thailand insurgency.

Under the treaty, Thailand relinquished claims to Kedah (Thai: ไทรบุรี, romanized: Saiburi), Kelantan (กลันตัน, Kalantan), Perlis (ปะลิส, Palit) and Terengganu (ตรังกานู, Trangkanu), which entered the British sphere of influence as protectorates. During World War II, Thailand briefly reclaimed these territories with Japanese permission, but they were returned to British control after the defeat of the Axis powers. These four states, together with Johor, later became known as the Unfederated Malay States, eventually joining the Federation of Malaya and forming part of present-day Malaysia.

== Background ==
The Kingdom of Siam was controlled by the monarch. Although there were many previous monarchs, those most responsible for maintaining Siam's independence begins with Rama I (r. 1782–1809). Unlike previous rulers, Rama I was a technocratic ruler who consulted with social elites on political matters and Sangha (Buddhist monks) on religious matters. His consultations with the Siamese elites became de rigueur for his successors. Rama I was succeeded by Rama II (r. 1809–1824). Rama II's greatest accomplishment was the establishment of a government of ministers. Near the end of his reign, in 1820, the British came on the scene seeking control of Penang. Rama II was followed by Rama III (r. 1824–1851). He granted concessions to the British in exchange for their support. The same would be done later with the French.

In 1826, in an effort to establish independence, Rama III and British officials signed the Burney Treaty. The treaty affirmed British assent that Kedah, Perlis, Terengganu and Patani were Thai provinces while Penang and Province Wellesley belonged to the British and that the Siamese would permit British trade in Kelantan and Terengganu. After Rama III's reign, a succession crisis brought Mongkut (r. 1851–1868) to power. Under Mongkut's leadership the Bowring Treaty of 1855 was signed. It provided British subjects in Siam with extraterritoriality, meaning that Britons would have British laws applied to them rather than Siamese. Mongkut constantly made concessions to the British and French to maintain independence in Siam until, in 1868, he was succeeded by Chulalongkorn, who ruled from 1868 to 1910. Chulalongkorn was a moderniser, similar to his predecessors. He abolished slavery, centralised revenues, created a national educational system, and safeguarded Siamese independence.

== Treaty ==
The Anglo-Siamese Treaty of 1909, signed under the leadership of Chulalongkorn, consists of eight articles. In return for the four provinces Siam ceded in the treaty, extraterritorial protections for most Asian subjects of Britain were removed, and the Siamese government received a loan at 4 percent interest from the Federated Malay States to build a railway in southern Siam.

=== Article 1 ===
"The Siamese government transfers to the British government all rights of suzerainty, protection, administration and control whatsoever which they possess over the states of Kelantan, Tringganu, Kedah, Perlis, and adjacent islands. The frontiers of these territories are defined by the boundary protocol annexed hereto."

=== Article 2 ===
The transfer provided for in the preceding article shall take place within thirty days after the ratification of this treaty.

=== Article 3 ===
A mixed commission, composed of Siamese and British officials and officers, shall be appointed within six months after the date of ratification of this treaty and shall be charged with the delimitation of the new frontier. The work of the commission shall be commenced as soon as the season permits, and shall be carried out in accordance with the boundary protocol annexed hereto.

Subjects of his majesty the king of Siam residing within the territory described in article 1 who desire to preserve their Siamese nationality will, during the period of six months after the ratification of the present treaty, be allowed to do so if they become domiciled in the Siamese dominions. His Britannic majesty's government under take that they shall be at liberty to retain their immovable property within the territory described in article 1.

It is understood that in accordance with the usual custom where a change of suzerainty takes place, any concessions within the territories described in article 1 hereof to individuals or companies, granted by or with the approval of the Siamese government, and recognised by them as still in force on the date of the signature of the treaty, will be recognised by the government of his Britannic majesty.

=== Article 4 ===
His Britannic majesty's government undertake that the government of the Federated Malay States shall assume the indebtedness to the Siamese government of the territories described in article 1.

=== Article 5 ===
The jurisdiction of the Siamese International Courts, established by article 8 of the treaty of 3 September 1883, shall, under the conditions defined in the jurisdiction protocol annexed hereto, be extended to all British subjects in Siam registered at the British consulates before the date of the present treaty.

This system shall come to an end, and the jurisdiction of the International Courts shall be transferred to the ordinary Siamese courts after the promulgation and the coming into force of the Siamese codes, namely, the penal code, the civil and commercial codes, the codes of procedure, and the law for organisation of courts.

All other British subjects in Siam shall be subject to the jurisdiction of the ordinary Siamese courts under the conditions defined in the jurisdiction protocol.

=== Article 6 ===
British subjects shall enjoy throughout the whole extent of Siam the rights and privileges enjoyed by the natives of the country, notably the right of property the right of residence and travel.

They and their property shall be subject to all taxes and services, but these shall not be other or higher than the taxes and services which are or maybe imposed by law on Siamese subjects. It is particularly understood that the limitation in the agreement of 20 September 1900, by which the taxation of land shall not exceed that on similar land in Lower Burmah, is hereby removed.

British subjects in Siam shall be exempt from all military service, either in the army or navy, and from all forced loans or military exactions or contributions.

=== Article 7 ===
The provisions of all treaties, agreements, and conventions between Great Britain and Siam, not modified by the present treaty remain in full force.

=== Article 8 ===
The present treaty shall be ratified within four months from its date.

In witness where of the respective plenipotentiaries have signed the present treaty and affixed their seals. Done at Bangkok, in duplicate, the 10th day of March, in the year 1909."

== See also ==
- British Malaya
- Si Rat Malai, when Thailand tried to reclaim these southern territories during World War II.
- Peninsular Malaysia
