= Deaths in July 2004 =

The following is a list of notable deaths in July 2004.

Entries for each day are listed alphabetically by surname. A typical entry lists information in the following sequence:

- Name, age, country of citizenship at birth, subsequent country of citizenship (if applicable), reason for notability, cause of death (if known), and reference.

== July 2004 ==
=== 1 ===
- Peter Barnes, 73, British screenwriter and playwright, stroke.
- Marlon Brando, 80, American actor (The Godfather, On the Waterfront, A Streetcar Named Desire), Oscar winner (1954, 1973), pulmonary fibrosis, respiratory failure.
- Ettore Cella, 90, Swiss actor and film director.
- Rolando Etchepare, 74, Chilean Olympic basketball player (1956).
- Karin Evans, 96, South African-German stage and film actress.
- Mohinder Lal, 68, Indian hockey player and Olympic champion (1960, 1964).
- Richard May, 65, British former presiding judge, International Criminal Tribunal for the Former Yugoslavia, brain cancer.
- Zdeněk Otáhal, 68, Czech Olympic weightlifter (1960, 1964).
- Jasper Ridley, 84, British writer.
- Jacques Ruffié, 82, French haematologist, geneticist, and anthropologist.
- Todor Skalovski, 95, Macedonian composer, chorus and orchestra conductor.
- Travis Tidwell, 75, American football player (Auburn Tigers, New York Giants).

=== 2 ===
- Sophia de Mello Breyner Andresen, 84, Portuguese writer and poet.
- Jeillo Edwards, 61, Sierra Leonean actress, first black actor to appear on "The Bill".
- Fernand Girard, 80, Canadian politician, member of the House of Commons of Canada (1953-1957).
- Mochtar Lubis, 82, Indonesian journalist and writer.
- James Mackay, 85, American politician (U.S. Representative for Georgia's 4th congressional district from 1965 to 1967).
- John Cullen Murphy, 85, American comic strip artist (Prince Valiant).
- Mfulupinga Nlando Victor, 59, Angolan politician, gunshot wounds.
- Sky Beauty, 14, American thoroughbred.
- Gael Turnbull, 76, Scottish poet.
- Ponkunnam Varkey, 94, Indian writer and activist.

=== 3 ===
- John Barron, 83, English actor.
- Phoebe Brand, 96, American actress, pneumonia.
- Vivianna Torun Bülow-Hübe, 76, Swedish jewelry designer
- Freddy de Vree, 64, Belgian poet and literary critic.
- Lem Harkey, 70, American football player (San Francisco 49ers).
- Andriyan Nikolayev, 74, Russian cosmonaut (Vostok 3, Soyuz 9), heart attack.
- James Marshall Sprouse, 80, American federal judge (Senior Judge of the United States Court of Appeals for the Fourth Circuit).
- Subandrio, 89, Indonesian politician Foreign Minister and First Deputy Prime Minister of Indonesia under President Sukarno.
- Lionel Van Brabant, 77, Belgian cyclist.
- Percy Wickman, 63, Canadian politician and activist for people with disabilities.

=== 4 ===
- Jean-Marie Auberson, 84, Swiss orchestra conductor.
- Pati Behrs, 82, Russian-American prima ballerina, actress and first wife of filmmaker John Derek.
- Jean-Louis Florentz, 56, French composer, cancer.
- Plato A. Skouras, 74, American movie producer (Apache Warrior, Francis of Assisi).

=== 5 ===
- Robert Burchfield, 81, English lexicographer.
- Augustine Ofuokwu, 59, Nigerian footballer and Olympian (1968).
- Jim Paschal, 77, American NASCAR driver, cancer.
- Andy Sabados, 87, American gridiron football player (The Citadel, Chicago Cardinals).
- Hugh Shearer, 81, Jamaican politician and trade unionist, former Prime Minister of Jamaica.
- Rodger Ward, 83, American racecar driver, two-time Indianapolis 500 champion.

=== 6 ===
- Rabin Bhatta, 79-80, Indian Olympic boxer (1948).
- Peter Birks, 62, British academic lawyer, cancer.
- Eric Douglas, 46, American actor and comedian, youngest son of Kirk Douglas, drug overdose.
- Ángel Fernández-Santos, 70, Spanish film critic and screenwriter.
- Walter Frentz, 96, German cameraman, film producer and photographer.
- Ignatius J. Galantin, 93, United States Navy admiral.
- Thomas Klestil, 71, Austrian diplomat and politician, Federal President of Austria, heart failure.
- Pavel Lisitsian, 92, Russian opera singer.
- Samir Naqqash, 66, Israeli novelist, short-story writer, and playwright.
- Jimmie F. Skaggs, 59, American film actor (Catch Me If You Can, Lethal Weapon, Cutthroat Island), lung cancer.
- Syreeta Wright, 58, American singer and songwriter, ex-wife of Stevie Wonder, breast cancer.

=== 7 ===
- Jaroslav Huleš, 30, Czech motorcycle racer, suicide.
- Günther Josten, 82, German Luftwaffe flying ace during World War II.
- Vlado Kristl, 81, Croatian-German filmmaker and artist.
- Samuel Mitja Rapoport, 91, Russian Empire-born German biochemist.
- Jeff Smith, 65, American author and television chef.
- Xiaokai Yang, 55, Chinese-Australian economist, lung cancer.

=== 8 ===
- Frank Anger, 64, American Olympic fencer (1964).
- Paula Danziger, 59, American author, heart attack.
- Alexis von Rosenberg, Baron de Redé, 82, French banker and socialite.
- Ernst R. G. Eckert, 99, American scientist.
- Albert Friedlander, 77, German rabbi.
- Hans Harting, 78, Dutch Olympic middle-distance runner (1952).
- Henrique Mendes, 73, Portuguese television presenter and actor, bone cancer.
- Sven Thunman, 84, Swedish ice hockey player and Olympic medalist (1948, 1952).

=== 9 ===
- Carlo Di Palma, 79, Italian cinematographer (Blowup, Hannah and Her Sisters, Bullets over Broadway).
- Lionel Brett, 4th Viscount Esher, 90, British peer, architect and town-planner.
- Paul Klebnikov, 41, American journalist, editor of Forbes magazine's Russian edition, murdered.
- Rudy LaRusso, 66, American basketball player (Minneapolis/Los Angeles Lakers, San Francisco Warriors), five-time National Basketball Association All-Star, Parkinson's disease.
- Jean Lefebvre, 84, French actor, heart attack.
- Tony Lupien, 87, American baseball player (Boston Red Sox, Philadelphia Phillies, Chicago White Sox).
- Sammy McKim, 79, Canadian film actor and artist, heart attack.
- Ron Milner, 66, African-American playwright, liver cancer.
- Bill Randle, 81, American disc jockey, cancer.
- Isabel Sanford, 86, American actress (The Jeffersons, Guess Who's Coming to Dinner, Lady Sing the Blues), Emmy winner (1981), heart attack, heart disease.
- Hugo S. Sims, Jr., 82, American lawyer and politician (U.S. Representative for South Carolina's 2nd congressional district).

=== 10 ===
- Abdul Ghafoor, 85-86, Indian politician, Chief Minister of Bihar.
- Inge Meysel, 94, German actress, cardioplegia.
- Loren Mosher, 70, American psychiatrist.
- Maria de Lourdes Pintasilgo, 74, Portuguese chemical engineer and politician, prime minister (1979-1980), heart attack.
- Joseph L. Nellis, 87, Washington attorney involved in various government investigations into organized crime in America.
- Libuše Nováková, 80, Czech Olympic discus thrower (1952).
- Georgi Proskurin, 59, Soviet pair skater.
- Art Rebel, 67, American baseball player (Philadelphia Phillies, St. Louis Cardinals).

=== 11 ===
- Lothar Baier, 62, German author, publisher, and translator, suicide.
- Van Deren Coke, 83, American photographer, scholar and museum director.
- Joe Gold, 82, American bodybuilding pioneer and Gold's Gym founder.
- Dorothy Hart, 82, American actress, Alzheimer's disease.
- Stan Hawkins, 79, British Olympic water polo player (1952).
- Frances Hyland, 77, Canadian theatre actress, respiratory disease.
- Haije Kramer, 86, Dutch chess master and theoretician.
- Terry McLean, 90, New Zealand sports journalist.
- Laurance Rockefeller, 94, American businessman, conservationist and philanthropist, respiratory failure.
- Renée Saint-Cyr, 99, French actress.
- Edkhyam Tenishev, 83, Soviet and Russian linguist.
- Walter Wager, 79, American author, cancer.

=== 12 ===
- George Mallaby, 64, British-Australian actor and scriptwriter, congestive heart failure.
- Jeff Morris, 69, American actor (Kelly's Heroes, The Blues Brothers, The Two Jakes), cancer.
- Betty Oliphant, 85, English founder of Canada's National Ballet School.
- James Quinn, 97, American Olympic sprinter (1928).
- Emma Yefimova, 72, Soviet Olympic fencer (1956).

=== 13 ===
- Arthur Kane, 55, American bassist for the New York Dolls, leukemia.
- Carlos Kleiber, 74, Austrian conductor.
- Betty Luna, 77, American baseball player.
- Michio Morishima, 80, Japanese economist.
- Roger Quenolle, 78, French football player.
- Karel Zich, 55, Czech singer, guitarist and composer, heart attack.

=== 14 ===
- Nelly Borgeaud, 72, French film actress.
- Germano de Figueiredo, 71, Portuguese footballer.
- Hoegeng Imam Santoso, 82, Indonesian chief of police, stroke.
- Tadeusz Sołtyk, 94, Polish aircraft designer and aerospace engineer.
- Alex Willoughby, 59, Scottish footballer (Rangers, Aberdeen), cancer.
- Arnold Ziff, 77, English businessman and philanthropist.

=== 15 ===
- Saeed Anwar, 60, Pakistani field hockey player and Olympic champion (1964, 1968, 1972).
- Banoo Jehangir Coyaji, 86, Indian doctor and family planning activist.
- Frank Giddens, 45, American football player (Philadelphia Eagles).
- Tom Greenway, 47, Canadian judoka and Olympian (1976).
- Willy Klein, 91, Luxembourgian Olympic gymnast (1936).
- Wal Murray, 72, Australian politician.
- Sandra Payson, 78, American arts patron, socialite
- Charles Reidy, 92, Irish hammer thrower and rugby union player.
- Teun Roosenburg, 88, Dutch sculptor.
- František Schmucker, 64, Czech football player and Olympian (1964).
- Derek Taunt, 86, British mathematician.
- Yoko Watanabe, 51, Japanese operatic soprano, cancer.
- Sunao Yoshida, 34, Japanese novelist, lung blockage.

=== 16 ===
- George Busbee, 76, American politician, former governor of Georgia, heart attack.
- Andy Engman, 92, Swedish-Finnish cartoon animator.
- Fazal khaliq, 70, Afghan politician.
- Lucien Leduc, 85, French football midfielder and a manager.
- Bella Lewitzky, 88, American modern dance pioneer and choreographer, heart attack.
- John Park, 80, Hong Kong Olympic sailor (1964, 1968).
- Charles Sweeney, 84, American Air Force officer, pilot of Bockscar, the B-29 that dropped the Nagasaki atomic bomb.

=== 17 ===
- Susan, Crown Princess of Albania, 63, Australian-born wife of the pretender to Albania's throne, Leka Zogu, cancer.
- Albela, 63, Pakistani actor, comedian and singer.
- Grzegorz Cziura, 52, Polish weightlifter and Olympic silver medalist (1972, 1976).
- Jeanette Dolson, 85, Canadian athlete and Olympic medalist (1936).
- Émile Gretsch, 95, Luxembourgian Olympic fencer (1948, 1952, 1956).
- Khalil Hilmi, 94-95, Lebanese Olympic sports shooter (1948, 1952).
- Julian Hodge, 99, British entrepreneur and banker.
- Marty Passaglia, 85, American basketball player (Washington Capitols, Indianapolis Jets).
- Pat Roach, 67, English professional wrestler and actor (Raiders of the Lost Ark, Auf Wiedersehen, Pet, Willow), cancer.
- Robert E. Smylie, 89, American politician, Governor of Idaho (1955-1967).

=== 18 ===
- Anne Gorsuch Burford, 62, American attorney and politician.
- André Castelot, 93, French writer and scriptwriter.
- Georgine Darcy, 71, American dancer and actress.
- George Farm, 80, Scottish football goalkeeper and manager.
- Paul Foot, 66, British journalist and campaigner, heart attack.
- John D. Kraus, 94, American physicist and electrical engineer.
- Eoin McKiernan, 89, American scholar and expert on Irish history.
- Herb Nelson, 83, American football player (Buffalo Bisons, Brooklyn Dodgers).
- Richard Ney, 87, American actor, investment counselor, and author, heart attack.
- Émile Peynaud, 92, French wine expert.
- Géza Tóth, 42 Hungarian handballer and Olympian (1988).
- Christopher Veitch, 75, South African Olympic rower (1952).

=== 19 ===
- Sylvia Daoust, 102, Canadian artist and sculptor.
- Fred Diute, 75, American basketball player (St. Bonaventure Bonnies, Milwaukee Hawks).
- Harry Forsyth, 100, Irish cricketer and centenarian.
- Mal Hammack, 71, American football player (Chicago/St. Louis Cardinals).
- Carvalho Leite, 92, Brazilian footballer.
- Roger Marquis, 67, American baseball player (Baltimore Orioles).
- Francis A. Marzen, Roman Catholic priest and journalist
- Caitro Soto, 69, Peruvian musician and composer.
- Zenkō Suzuki, 93, Japanese politician, Prime Minister (1980-1982), pneumonia.
- Irvin Yeaworth, 78, German-American film director, producer, and theme park builder, traffic collision.

=== 20 ===
- Antonio Gades, 67, Spanish flamenco dancer, cancer.
- Ľudovít Lancz, 40, Slovak footballer.
- Lala Mara, 73, Fijian chieftainess and former First Lady, widow of president Ratu Sir Kamisese Mara.
- Valdemaras Martinkėnas, 39, Soviet and Lithuanian football player and coach, drowned.
- James Williams, 53, American jazz pianist.

=== 21 ===
- Gianbattista Alfonsetti, 74, Italian Olympic boxer (1952).
- Jerry Goldsmith, 75, American film composer (Star Trek, The Omen, Alien), Oscar winner (1977), colorectal cancer.
- Edward B. Lewis, 85, American biologist (Nobel Prize in Physiology or Medicine 1995).
- Neal A. Maxwell, 78, American missionary in the Church of Jesus Christ of Latter-day Saints, leukemia.
- Sjef Mertens, 78, Dutch footballer.
- Radoy Ralin, 82, Bulgarian dissident, poet, and satirist.
- Julian Ridsdale, 89, British politician.

=== 22 ===
- Elie Abel, 83, Canadian-American journalist, author and academic, Alzheimer's disease.
- Frank Cumiskey, 91, American gymnast and Olympic silver medalist (1932, 1936, 1948).
- Sacha Distel, 71, French singer, cancer.
- Illinois Jacquet, 81, American jazz saxophonist, heart attack.
- Joan Morgan, 99, English film actress, screenwriter and novelist.
- Bob Paremore, 64, American football player (Florida A&M Rattlers, St. Louis Cardinals).
- Bertie Peacock, 75, Northern Ireland football player and manager.
- Kostiantyn Stepankov, 76, Ukrainian soviet actor, pancreatic cancer.
- Ronald Sukenick, 72, American writer and literary theorist, inclusion body myositis.

=== 23 ===
- Mehmood Ali, 71, Indian actor, respiratory disease.
- Joe Cahill, 84, Provisional IRA founder, chief of staff; died after short illness (diagnosed with asbestosis).
- Alan Cook, 81, British physicist.
- Jacques Debeur, 67, Belgian Olympic fencer (1956, 1960).
- Rogelio Domínguez, 73, Argentine football player, heart attack.
- Héctor Droguett, 79, Chilean Olympic cyclist (1952).
- José Duarte, 68, Brazilian football manager.
- Ferry Gruber, 77, Austrian-German tenor in opera and operetta.
- Carlos Paredes, 79, Portuguese guitar player, kidney failure.
- Piero Piccioni, 82, Italian film score composer and lawyer.
- Serge Reggiani, 82, French singer and actor, heart attack.

=== 24 ===
- Jagan Nath Azad, 85, Indian Urdu poet, writer and academician.
- Bob Azzam, 78, Egyptian singer.
- Claude Ballif, 80, French composer, writer, and pedagogue.
- Cotton Fitzsimmons, 72, American NBA basketball coach, lung cancer.
- János Harmatta, 86, Hungarian linguist.
- Lauri Kalima, 87, Finnish high jumper and Olympian (1936).
- Ben Martin, 83, American football player and coach.
- Wilton Mkwayi, 80, South African Anti-apartheid activist and ANC militant, cancer.
- Alfredo Petrone, 87, Uruguayan Olympic boxer (1936).
- Krastana Stoeva, 63, Bulgarian Olympic cross-country skier (1960, 1964).
- Wim Verstappen, 67, Dutch film director, producer, and screen writer, cancer.

=== 25 ===
- Herb Barnhill, 91, American baseball player.
- Maurice Euzennat, 77, French historian and archaeologist.
- John Passmore, 89, Australian philosopher.
- Totò Savio, 66, Italian composer, lyricist, producer, and guitarist.
- Masami Shimojō, 88, Japanese actor.

=== 26 ===
- Oğuz Aral, 68, Turkish caricaturist and cartoonist, heart attack.
- Tomaž Cerkovnik, 44, Slovenian Olympic alpine skier (1984).
- Viola Frey, 70, American artist and professor of arts.
- Rubén Gómez, 77, Puerto Rican baseball player (San Francisco Giants, Philadelphia Phillies, Cleveland Indians, Minnesota Twins).
- Alexandr Hackenschmied, 96, Czech-American photographer, film director, and cinematographer.
- Carl Lidbom, 78, Swedish jurist.
- William A. Mitchell, 92, American food scientist, inventor of Pop Rocks candy and Tang drink mix, heart failure.
- Bogusław Sochnacki, 73, Polish actor.

=== 27 ===
- Roger Colliot, 78, French footballer and Olympian (1952).
- Carmine DeSapio, 95, American politician, last head of the Tammany Hall organization.
- David Descalzo, 84, Peruvian Olympic basketball player (1948).
- Harry Jenkins, Sr., 78, Australian politician and medical doctor.
- Lisette Lanvin, 90, French film actress.
- Joseph Rovan, 86, French philosopher and politician, drowned.
- Bob Tisdall, 97, Irish Olympic athlete (1932).

=== 28 ===
- Juhani Avellan, 58, Finnish weightlifter and Olympian (1972, 1976, 1980).
- Jackson Beck, 92, American announcer and voice actor (The Adventures of Superman), stroke.
- Francis Crick, 88, British biologist, one of the discoverers of the "double-helix" shape of DNA, cancer.
- J. Alphonse Deveau, 86, Canadian historian.
- Sam Edwards, 89, American actor (Twelve O'Clock High, Little House on the Prairie, Dragnet), heart failure.
- Steve Patterson, 56, American basketball player and coach at Arizona State University, lung cancer.
- Janet Paul, 84, New Zealand publisher, painter and art historian.
- Eugene Roche, 75, American actor (Webster, All in the Family, Soap), heart attack.
- Bernard Saint-Hillier, 92, French general.
- Tiziano Terzani, 65, Italian journalist, famous for his books on Asia, colorectal cancer.

=== 29 ===
- Pratima Bandopadhyay, 69, Indian playback singer.
- Susan Buffett, 71, American activist and first wife of businessman and investor Warren Buffett, stroke.
- Jens Juul Eriksen, 78, Danish Olympic cyclist (1952).
- Walter Feit, 73, American mathematician.
- Nafisa Joseph, 26, Indian model, MTV video jockey, and Miss India 1997, suicide by hanging.
- Abdul Rahman bin Saud Al Saud, 57, Saudi prince and the longtime president of football club Al Nassr.
- Wee Tian Siak, 83, Chinese-born Singaporean Olympic basketball player (1948, 1956).
- Rena Vlahopoulou, 81, Greek comedian, heart attack.

=== 30 ===
- Ali Abbasi, 42, Scottish television presenter, systemic lupus erythematosus.
- Ellen Auerbach, 98, German-American photographer.
- Vivica Bandler, 87, Finnish-Swedish theatre director and agronomist.
- Jan Hanuš, 89, Czech composer.
- Nela Martínez, 91, Ecuadorian communist, political activist, and writer.
- J. Edward McKinley, 86, American actor.
- Ed Melvin, 88, Serbian-American basketball player (Pittsburgh Ironmen).
- Hirendranath Mukherjee, 96, Indian politician.
- Romedi Spada, 79, Swiss Olympic alpine skier (1948).
- John Geoffrey Tracey, 74, Australian ecologist and botanist.
- Wolfgang Ullmann, 74, German journalist, theologian, politician.
- György Vizvári, 75, Hungarian water polo player and Olympic champion (1952).

=== 31 ===
- Laura Betti, 77, Italian actress, heart attack.
- Ed Bock, 87, American businessman and college football player (Iowa State Cyclones).
- Erich Ehrlinger, 93, German Nazi and Holocaust perpetrator during World War II.
- Virginia Grey, 87, American actress (Airport, Uncle Tom's Cabin, The Women), heart attack.
- David B. Haight, 97, American leader in the Church of Jesus Christ of Latter-day Saints.
- Robert James, 80, Scottish actor, Alzheimer's disease.
- Allu Rama Lingaiah, 81, Indian comedian.
- Absamat Masaliyev, 71, Kyrgyzstani communist politician, heart attack.
- Petra Peters, 79, German stage and film actress.
- Luis de Ridder, 76, Argentine Olympic alpine skier (1948, 1952).
- Líber Seregni, 87, Uruguayan army officer and politician, pancreatic cancer.
- Larry Stockmeyer, 56, American computer scientist, pancreatic cancer.
