= Weightlifting at the 1965 SEAP Games =

The Weightlifting at the '1965 Southeast Asian Peninsular Games was held between 15 and 17 December at Chinese Assembly Hall, Kuala Lumpur.

== Medal summary ==
=== Men ===
Event	Gold	Silver	Bronze
Flyweight	(Thailand) Chaiya Sukchinda	(Myanmar) Chit Tin	(Malaysia) Chua Weng Woo
Bantamweight	(Myanmar) Thein Kwye	(Singapore) Tang Chye Hong	(Thailand) M. Kruanakpurn
Featherweight	(Myanmar) Chit Mya	(Thailand) Sanun Tiamsert	(Malaysia) Lee Pang Ling
Lightweight	(Singapore) Tan Howe Liang	(Myanmar) Htain Min	(Thailand) Niras Haroon
Middleweight	(Myanmar) Pe Aye	(Singapore) Boo Kim Siang	(Malaysia) Cheah Tong Kim
Light Middleweight	(Malaysia) Yap Meeng Soon	(Myanmar) Kyaw Naing	(Singapore) Yeo Gim Chiang
Light-heavyweight	(Myanmar) Mya Thein	(Malaysia) Teo Tong Ann	(Thailand) V. Ratansuksophana
Heavyweight	(Myanmar) Ba Thein	(Malaysia) Harbans Singh	

== Medal table ==
Rank	Nation	Gold	Silver	Bronze	Total
1	Burma (BIR)	5	3	0	8
2	Malaysia (MAS)	1	2	3	6
3	Singapore (SIN)	1	2	1	4
4	Thailand (THA)	1	1	3	5
Totals (4 entries)		8	8	7	23

== Sources ==
- https://eresources.nlb.gov.sg/newspapers/Digitised/Article/straitstimes19651216-1.2.119
- https://eresources.nlb.gov.sg/newspapers/Digitised/Article/straitstimes19651217-1.2.123.2
- https://eresources.nlb.gov.sg/newspapers/Digitised/Article/straitstimes19651218-1.2.125
- https://eresources.nlb.gov.sg/newspapers/Digitised/Article/straitstimes19651219-1.2.76
