= Vân Sơn =

Vân Sơn may refer to:

== Places in Vietnam ==
- Vân Sơn, Sơn La, a ward of Sơn La province
- Vân Sơn, Bắc Ninh, a commune of Bắc Ninh city
- Vân Sơn, Phú Thọ, a commune of Phú Thọ province

== People ==
- Van Son (surname)
- Van Son (cyclist) (born 1934), Cambodian cyclist
- Vân Sơn (comedian) (born 1961), Vietnamese comedian, founder of Van Son Entertainment
