= Rivière à l'Ours (rivière des Aulnaies) =

Location
- Country: Canada
- Province: Quebec
- Region: Saguenay–Lac-Saint-Jean
- MRC: Le Fjord-du-Saguenay Regional County Municipality

Physical characteristics
- Source: Lac à l'Ours
  - location: Bégin
  - coordinates: 48°42′46″N 71°15′11″W
  - elevation: 191 m (627 ft)
- Mouth: Rivière des Aulnaies
  - location: Saint-Ambroise
  - coordinates: 48°44′22″N 71°08′17″W
  - elevation: 120 m (390 ft)
- Length: 19.8 km (12.3 mi)

Basin features
- Tributaries
  - left: Ruisseau du Sault.
  - right: (upstream) Ruisseau à Néron, Le Petit Bras, décharge du Lac de la Belle Truite et de l’Étang Fortin.

The Rivière à l'Ours (English: Bear River) is a tributary of the rivière des Aulnaies, flowing on the northwest bank of the Saint Lawrence River, successively in the municipalities of Bégin and Saint-Ambroise, in the Fjord-du-Saguenay, in the region administrative Saguenay–Lac-Saint-Jean, in the Province of Quebec, in Canada.

The Rivière à l'Ours watershed is served by rue Simard (in the village of Saint-Ambroise), chemin du rang des Chutes, chemin du 9th rang and chemin de la Bleuetière. Secondary forest roads serve the upper part of this slope.

Forestry and agriculture are the main economic activities in the watershed.

The Bear River surface is usually frozen from late November to early April, however safe circulation on the ice is generally from mid-December to late March.

== Geography ==
The main watersheds adjacent to the Bear River are:

- North side: Lac à l'Ours, Lac La Mothe, Tchitogama Lake, Shipshaw River, Le Petit Bras, stream at Néron, Blanche River (via Tchitogama Lake);
- East side: Shipshaw River, Grenon Lake, rivière aux Vases, Caribou River, Valin River;
- South side: Saguenay River, Rivière des Aulnaies;
- West side: Rivière aux Sables, Péribonka River, Mistouk River, rivière aux Harts, rivière à la Pipe, lac Saint-Jean.

The Bear River takes its source from Bear Lake (length: 1.4 m (4 ft 7 in)); altitude: 191 m (627 ft)). This source is located in the municipality of Bégin at:

- 21.1 km (13.1 mi) South-East of the mouth of Tchitogama Lake (confluence with the Péribonka River);
- 4.0 km (2.5 mi) Southwest of La Mothe Lake;
- 26.3 m (86 ft)) North of the Saguenay River;
- 18.4 km (11.4 mi) North of the mouth of the Rivière à l'Ours (confluence with the Rivière des Aulnaies).

From the head lake, the Bear River flows over 19.8 km (12.3 mi), in forest, agricultural and village areas, according to the following segments:

- 3.5 km (2.2 mi) towards the Southeast crossing Lac Bouleau, then forming a gap towards the East to flow towards the Southeast crossing Lac des Îles (length: 2.7 km (1.7 mi); altitude: 208 m (682 ft)) to the mouth of Lac des Îles, to its mouth;
- 11.7 km (7.3 mi) southwest to Le Petit Bras stream, then south by crossing Chemin Truchon and crossing the boundary between Bégin and Saint-Ambroise, to the bridge on chemin du 2th rang Est;
- 3.9 km (2.4 mi) towards the South-West by cutting the path of 9th rang and meandering in parallel (on the North-West side) at the path of rang des Chutes, to the street Armband;
- 0.7 km (0.43 mi) to the south by collecting the Sault stream (coming from the East) and passing west of the village of Saint-Ambroise, to the mouth of the river.

The Bear River flows onto the northeast bank of the Aulnaies River. This mouth is located at:

- 8.5 km (5.3 mi) North-west of the mouth of the Rivière aux Aulnaies (Saguenay River) (confluence with the Saguenay river);
- 14.5 km (9.0 mi) North-West of the Shipshaw powerhouse dam which is crossed by the Saguenay river;
- 23.8 km (14.8 mi) north-west of downtown Saguenay;
- 5.1 km (3.2 mi) west of the Shipshaw River;
- 127 km (79 mi) West of the mouth of the Saguenay River (confluence with the St. Lawrence River).

== Toponymy ==
In his report on the township of Bégin in 1895, the land surveyor Jean Maltais, mentions "la rivière à l'Ours".

The toponym of “Rivière à l'Ours” was formalized on April 8, 1975, at the Place Names Bank of the Commission de toponymie du Québec.
