= Karl Bélanger =

Canadian politician

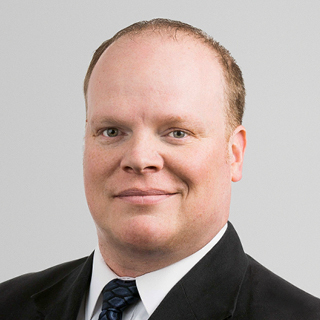

President of the Douglas-Coldwell Foundation
- In office November 24, 2016 – September 13, 2022
- Preceded by: David McDonald
- Succeeded by: Irene Mathyssen

National Director of the New Democratic Party (interim)
- In office January 23, 2016 – September 12, 2016
- Leader: Tom Mulcair
- Preceded by: Anne McGrath
- Succeeded by: Robert Fox

Personal details
- Born: c. 1975 Quebec City, Quebec
- Party: New Democratic
- Education: Université Laval; Cégep de Jonquière

Karl Bélanger (born 1975) is a Canadian former political strategist.

== Career ==
He was the interim national director of the New Democratic Party (NDP) of Canada from January 23, 2016 to September 12, 2016.

He was principal secretary to NDP Leader Tom Mulcair during his tenure as leader of the Official Opposition. Bélanger was a member of NDP Leader Jack Layton's team, serving as senior press secretary. He also was his principal secretary for Quebec in spring 2009, ahead of the Quebec Orange Crush. He remained senior press secretary under the interim leadership of Nycole Turmel.

He was the spokesman for Alexa McDonough when she was NDP Leader and has worked for the party since the 1997 federal election. Bélanger is a native of Quebec City.

He was a candidate in the 1993 federal election in the riding of Jonquière, and in the 1996 federal by-election in Lac-Saint-Jean. He was president of the New Democratic Youth of Québec from 1994 to 1998 and vice-president of the New Democratic Youth of Canada from 1995 to 1997.

He appears regularly on CTV's Power Play and Ici Radio-Canada Télé and is a regular columnist for Loonie Politics and L'actualité. He is also a regular guest on radio stations, including CFRA and Cogeco radio stations.

He was President of the Douglas-Coldwell Foundation from 2016 to 2022.

He earned a Bachelor of Arts degree in political science from Université Laval in Quebec City in 1997. He previously had received a college degree in arts and media technology at the Jonquière CEGEP in 1995.

Alan Kellogg of the Edmonton Journal called Bélanger "a Great Canadian" for his longtime work as assistant to the NDP leader.

Bélanger placed numerous times on the Terrific Twenty-Five Staffers List, as put together by the Hill Times, based on a survey of parliamentary staff. He was listed as #3 in 2014.

He is portrayed by Joel Keller in the 2013 CBC Television film Jack.

Bélanger lives in Chelsea, Quebec.

== Electoral record ==
Canadian federal by-election, March 25, 1996: Lac-Saint-Jean On the resignation of Lucien Bouchard
Party	Candidate	Votes	%	±%
Bloc Québécois	Stéphan Tremblay	20,777	76.56	+1.04
Liberal	Clément Lajoie	5,846	21.54	+6.93
Progressive Conservative	Philippe Harris	205	0.76	-7.89
Reform	Denis Simard	175	0.64	New
New Democratic	Karl Bélanger	136	0.50	-0.73
Total valid votes		27,139	99.47	
Total rejected ballots		144	0.53	
Turnout		27,283	54.87	
Eligible voters		49,726		
Bloc Québécois hold		Swing		-2.95
Source: Elections Canada

1993 Canadian federal election: Jonquière
Party	Candidate	Votes
Bloc Québécois	André Caron	25,061
Progressive Conservative	Jean-Pierre Blackburn	6,637
Liberal	Gilles Savard	4,519
Natural Law	Normand Dufour	435
New Democratic	Karl Bélanger	410

== Awards and recognition ==
Bélanger received the Queen Elizabeth II Diamond Jubilee Medal in 2012. He was nominated by NDP MP Nycole Turmel.

Ribbon	Description	Notes
	Queen Elizabeth Diamond Jubilee Medal	Decoration awarded in 2012; Canadian version
