= Quang Minh (disambiguation) =

Quang Minh is a commune in the municipality of Hanoi, Vietnam.

Quang Minh may also refer to:

- Quang Minh, Hanoi, a former township of Mê Linh district
- Quang Minh, Hà Gian], a former commune of Bắc Quang district
- Quang Minh, Hải Dương, a former commune of Gia Lộc district
- Quang Minh, Bắc Giang, a former commune of Hiệp Hòa district
- Quang Minh, Thái Bình, a former commune of Kiến Xương district
- Quang Minh, Sơn La, a former commune of Vân Hồ district
- Quang Minh, Yên Bái, a former commune of Văn Yên district

== See also ==
- Quảng Minh (disambiguation)
