= Rivière des Aulnaies (Saguenay River) =

Watercourse in Canada

Location
- Country: Canada
- Province: Quebec
- Region: Saguenay–Lac-Saint-Jean
- MRC: Le Fjord-du-Saguenay Regional County Municipality

Physical characteristics
- Source: Lac à l'Ours
  - location: Bégin
  - coordinates: 48°39′59″N 71°25′22″W
  - elevation: 138 m (453 ft)
- Mouth: Saguenay River
  - location: Bégin
  - coordinates: 48°28′42″N 71°18′54″W
  - elevation: 67 m (220 ft)
- Length: 36.0 km (22.4 mi)

Basin features
- Progression: Saguenay River, Saint Lawrence River
- Tributaries
  - left: (upstream) Rivière à l'Ours (rivière des Aulnaies), Fraser Creek, William Creek, rivière des Habitants.
  - right: (upstream) Lalancette stream, Lac Vert outlet, Labonté River, Gaudreault stream, Ludger-Lavoie stream, Lac Vert outlet.

The rivière des Aulnaies is a tributary of the Saguenay River, flowing on the northwest shore of the Saint Lawrence River, successively in the municipalities of Bégin and Saint-Ambroise, in the Le Fjord-du-Saguenay Regional County Municipality, in the administrative region of Saguenay–Lac-Saint-Jean, in the Province of Quebec, in Canada.

The watershed of the Aulnaies River is served by:

- west side: via chemin Saint-Léonard, chemin du rang Ouest, chemin du 7th rang, chemin du 5th rang, chemin du 8th rang and 2nd West range for the upper part;
- east side: via the rang des Aulnaies road which separates from the double range road and which becomes north the main road, the 4th range road, the 5th road range.

Forestry and agriculture are the main economic activities in the watershed.

The surface of the rivière des Aulnaies is usually frozen from the end of November to the beginning of April, but the safe circulation on the ice is generally done from mid-December to the end of March.

== Geography ==
The main watersheds neighboring the rivière des Aulnaies are:

- North side: Labrecque Lake, rivière des Habitants, Tchitogama Lake, Péribonka River, rivière aux Sables (via Lake Labrecque);
- East side: rivière à l'Ours, Shipshaw River, Bras du Nord, Moncouche Lake, Caribou River;
- South side: Saguenay River, Gervais stream, Moellon lake stream;
- West side: Labonté River, rivière aux Sables, Péribonka River, Mistouk River, rivière aux Harts, rivière à la Pipe, Lac Saint-Jean.

The Aulnaies River takes its source from Chabot Lake (length: 1.8 m (5 ft 11 in)); altitude: 138 m (453 ft)). This source is located in the municipality of Labrecque at:

- 3.0 km (1.9 mi) east of Labrecque Lake;
- 16.2 km (10.1 mi) south-east of La Mothe Lake;
- 17.2 m (56 ft)) north of the Saguenay River;
- 22.4 km (13.9 mi) north-west of the mouth of the Aulnaies River (confluence with the Saguenay River).

From the head lake, the Aulnaies River flows over 25.8 km (16.0 mi), in forest, agricultural and village areas, according to the following segments:

- 1.3 km (0.81 mi) eastwards, to the rivière des Habitants (coming from the north-west);
- 4.9 km (3.0 mi) towards the south-east by collecting William Brook (coming from the north), up to Fraser Brook (coming from the north-east);
- 4.1 km (2.5 mi) towards the south-east by winding up to the Labonté River (coming from the west);
- 4.1 km (2.5 mi) towards the south-west by meandering, up to the rivière à l'Ours (coming from the north);
- 11.4 km (7.1 mi) towards the south-east by crossing the village of Saint-Ambroise and bypassing on the west side an area of marsh, to the mouth of the river.

The Aulnaies River flows on the north bank of the Saguenay River. This mouth is located at:

- 7.7 km (4.8 mi) west of the central Shipshaw dam which is crossed by the Saguenay River;
- 18.7 km (11.6 mi) west of downtown Saguenay;
- 8.8 km (5.5 mi) south-east of the center of the village of Saint-Ambroise;
- 123 km (76 mi) west of the mouth of the Saguenay River (confluence with the St. Lawrence River).

== Toponymy ==
The 1852 map designed by provincial surveyor Frederic William Blaiklock refers to the toponym "R. Des Aunes". The place name “Rivière des Aulnets” is also noted on the map of the township of Bourget in 1881. The land surveyor Jean Maltais, in his report on the township of Bégin, in 1895, mentions “the river of Aulnaies”. Appeared in Regions of Quebec, Lac-Saint-Jean, Chicoutimi and the north coast of the St. Lawrence, Description of surveyed cantons, explorations of territories and surveys of rivers and lakes, from 1889 to 1908, published by the Department des Terres et Forêts, Québec, 1908, page 6. The word aulnaie designates a place planted with alders. The Commission de géographie de Québec, today known as the Commission de toponymie du Québec, adopted the toponym "Rivière des Aulnaies" on November 4, 1948.

The toponym of "Rivière des Aulnaies" was formalized on December 5, 1968, at the Place Names Bank of the Commission de toponymie du Québec.
