= Hữu Sản =

Hữu Sản may refer to several places in Vietnam, including:

- Hữu Sản, Bắc Giang, a commune of Sơn Động District
- Hữu Sản, Hà Giang, a commune of Bắc Quang District
