= Mộc Sơn =

Mộc Sơn Phường Mộc Sơn
- Ward
- Interactive map of Mộc Sơn
- Country: Vietnam
- Regions: Northwest
- Province: Sơn La Province
- Established: June 16, 2025

Area
  - Total: 37.88 km^{2} (14.63 sq mi)

Population (2025)
  - Total: 15,025
  - Density: 396.6/km^{2} (1,027/sq mi)
- Time zone: UTC+07:00 (Indochina Time)

Mộc Sơn is a ward (phường) of Sơn La Province, Vietnam.

== Geography ==
Mộc Sơn Ward located in southeastern Sơn La Province, and adjacent to:

- Mộc Châu Ward to the north and west
- Chiềng Sơn Commune to the south
- Thảo Nguyên Ward, Vân Sơn Ward and Vân Hồ Commune to the east.

== History ==
On June 16, 2025, the Standing Committee of the National Assembly of Vietnam issued Resolution No. 1681/NQ-UBTVQH15 on the arrangement of commune-level administrative units of Sơn La Province in 2025 (effective from June 16, 2025). Accordingly, the entire land area and population of Đông Sang Ward and Mộc Sơn Ward were merged to form a new ward named Mộc Sơn Ward.
