= Van Son (surname) =

Van Son is a Dutch toponymic surname meaning "from/of Son", a town in North Brabant. People with the surname include:

- Adrian Vanson (né Adriaen van Son; died c.1602), Dutch-born court portrait painter to James VI of Scotland
- Daniël van Son (born 1994), Dutch football winger
- Jan Frans van Son (1658–1701), Flemish still life painter, son of Joris
- Jens van Son (born 1987), Dutch football midfielder
- Joris van Son (1623–1667), Flemish still life painter, father of Jan Frans
- Jos van Son (1893–1956), Dutch football forward
- Louis van Son (1922–1986), Dutch KVP politician
- Paul van Son (born 1953), Dutch energy trader, founder and honorary president of EFET

== See also ==
- Van Son (cyclist), Cambodian cyclist
- Vanson, river in southeast France
- Vân Sơn (disambiguation), several communes in Vietnam
