= Smaisuk Krisansuwan =

Thai cyclist (born 1943)

Personal information
- Born: 8 July 1943 (age 83)
- Height: 175 cm (5 ft 9 in)
- Weight: 67 kg (148 lb)

Cycling career
- Sport: Cycling
Medal record
Men's road bicycle racing
Representing Thailand
Southeast Asian Games
Gold medal – first place	1965 Kuala Lumpur	100 km road team trial

Smaisuk Krisansuwan (born 8 July 1943) is a former Thai cyclist.

He won the gold medal at the 1965 SEAP Games in Kuala Lumpur, Malaysia in the 100 km road team time trial.

He competed in the individual pursuit and team pursuit events at the 1964 Summer Olympics.
