= Nguyễn Văn Châu =

Vietnamese cyclist

Personal information
- Born: 24 August 1940 (age 86)
- Height: 166 cm (5 ft 5 in)
- Weight: 61 kg (134 lb)

Cycling career
- Sport: Cycling
Medal record
Men's road bicycle racing
Representing Vietnam
Southeast Asian Games
Gold medal – first place	1961 Rangoon	1000 m
Silver medal – second place	1965 Kuala Lumpur	800 m

Nguyễn Văn Châu (born 24 August 1940) is a former Vietnamese cyclist. He became SEAP Games champion.

== Career ==
He became SEAP Games champion in the 1000 metres road sprint at the 1961 SEAP Games. In 1963 he also competed at the 1963 Asian Cycling Championships, but fell when taking the corner at the end of the first lap.

He competed in the men's sprint at the 1964 Summer Olympics.

In 1965, he was stated by his coach the favourite for the 1000 metres event at the 1965 SEAP Games. At these Games he won the silver medal in the 800 metres at the 1965 SEAP Games, he won the silver medal in the same time as Malaysian winner Shaharuddin Jaafar.

His coach was Nguyen Van Hoa.
