= Bùi Văn Hoàng =

Vietnamese cyclist (born 1943)

Personal information
- Born: 13 February 1943 (age 83) Saigon, French Indochina
- Height: 155 cm (5 ft 1 in)
- Weight: 50 kg (110 lb)

Cycling career
- Sport: Cycling
- Discipline: Road cycling
- Role: Rider
Medal record
Men's road bicycle racing
Representing South Vietnam
Southeast Asian Games
Bronze medal – third place	1965 Kuala Lumpur	100 km road team trial

Bùi Văn Hoàng (born 13 February 1943) is a former Vietnamese cyclist representing South Vietnam at international tournaments.

He won the bronze medal at the 1965 SEAP Games in Kuala Lumpur, Malaysia in the 100 km road team time trial.

He competed in the individual road race event at the 1968 Summer Olympics.
