= Colliot =

Colliot (French: [kɔljo]) is a French surname. Notable people with the surname include:

- Émile Colliot (1824–1881), French playwright and poet
- Jean-Louis Colliot-Thélène (born 1947), French mathematician
- Roger Colliot (1925–2004), French football defender
