= SEAP Games 3 =

The third SEAP Games can be:

- 1963 Southeast Asian Peninsular Games, supposedly held in Cambodia but later was cancelled.
- 1965 Southeast Asian Peninsular Games, officially held in Kuala Lumpur, Malaysia.
