= Jonquière—Alma =

Former federal electoral district in Quebec, Canada

Quebec electoral district
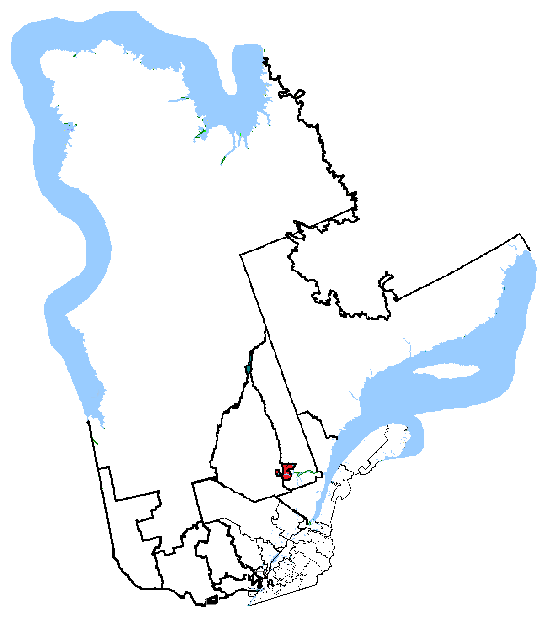
- Jonquière-Alma in relation to other Quebec federal electoral districts
- Coordinates: 48.523°N 71.385°W
- District created: 2003
- District abolished: 2012
- First contested: 2004
- Last contested: 2011
- District webpage: profile, map

Demographics
- Population (2011): 99,258
- Electors (2011): 79,322
- Area (km²): 1,524.81
- Census division(s): Le Fjord-du-Saguenay RCM, Lac-Saint-Jean-Est RCM, Saguenay
- Census subdivision(s): Alma, Jonquière, Saint-Ambroise

Jonquière—Alma was a federal electoral district in Quebec, Canada, that has been represented in the House of Commons of Canada from 2004 to 2011.

It was created in 2003 from parts of Jonquière and Lac-Saint-Jean—Saguenay ridings.

It consists of:

- the borough of Jonquière in the City of Saguenay,
- the City of Alma in the Regional County Municipality of Lac-Saint-Jean-Est, and
- the municipalities of Bégin, Larouche, Saint-Ambroise, Saint-Charles-de-Bourget and Saint-David-de-Falardeau in the Regional County Municipality of Le Fjord-du-Saguenay.

The neighbouring ridings are Roberval—Lac-Saint-Jean and Chicoutimi—Le Fjord.

This riding is distinctive for having the lowest Liberal vote percentage in the country in the 2006 election, at only 3.1.

This riding was dissolved into Jonquière and Lac-Saint-Jean during the 2012 electoral redistribution.

== Members of Parliament ==
This riding has elected the following members of Parliament:

Parliament	Years	Member	Party
Jonquière—Alma; Riding created from Jonquière and Lac-Saint-Jean—Saguenay
38th	2004–2006	Sébastien Gagnon	Bloc Québécois
39th	2006–2008	Jean-Pierre Blackburn	Conservative
40th	2008–2011	Jean-Pierre Blackburn	Conservative
41st	2011–2013	Claude Patry	New Democratic
41st	2013–2015	Claude Patry	Bloc Québécois
Riding dissolved into Jonquière and Lac-Saint-Jean

== Election results ==
2011 Canadian federal election
Party	Candidate	Votes	%	±%	Expenditures
New Democratic	Claude Patry	22,900	43.44	+38.56	
Conservative	Jean-Pierre Blackburn	18,569	35.22	-17.35	
Bloc Québécois	Pierre Forest	9,554	18.12	-19.44	
Liberal	Claude Ringuette	1,043	1.98	-3.18	
Green	France Bergeron	652	1.24	–	
Total valid votes/expense limit		52,718	100.00		
Total rejected ballots		624	1.17	-0.06	
Turnout		53,342	65.88	–	
Eligible voters		80,947	–	–	
New Democratic gain from Conservative		Swing		+27.96	

2008 Canadian federal election
Party	Candidate	Votes	%	±%	Expenditures
Conservative	Jean-Pierre Blackburn	26,639	52.57	+0.48	$76,949
Bloc Québécois	Chantale Bouchard	19,035	37.56	-1.74	$73,003
Liberal	Marc Dupéré	2,616	5.16	+2.20	$7,392
New Democratic	Jean-François Paradis	2,475	4.88	+1.01	
Total valid votes/expense limit		50,765	100.00		$84,949
Total rejected ballots		630	1.23		
Turnout		51,395	–		
Conservative hold		Swing		+1.11	

2006 Canadian federal election
Party	Candidate	Votes	%	±%	Expenditures
Conservative	Jean-Pierre Blackburn	27,262	52.09	+47.26	$33,046
Bloc Québécois	Sébastien Gagnon	20,569	39.30	-15.63	$61,638
New Democratic	Martin Bertrand	2,028	3.87	+0.47	$3,447
Liberal	Gilles Savard	1,550	2.96	-26.16	$12,756
Green	Sylvain Dompierre	928	1.77	+0.29	$121
Total valid votes/expense limit		52,337	100.00		$79,025
Conservative gain from Bloc Québécois		Swing		+31.45	

2004 Canadian federal election
Party	Candidate	Votes	%	±%	Expenditures
Bloc Québécois	Sébastien Gagnon	25,193	54.93	–	$72,155
Liberal	Daniel Giguère	13,355	29.12	–	$54,103
Independent	Jocelyne Girard-Bujold	2,737	5.97	–	$30,071
Conservative	Gilles Lavoie	2,217	4.83	–	$5,559
New Democratic	François Picard	1,561	3.40	–	$4,169
Green	Jean-Sébastien Busque	679	1.48	–	
Communist	Michel Perron	121	0.26	–	$676
Total valid votes		45,863	100.00	–	$78,257

== See also ==
- List of Canadian electoral districts
- Historical federal electoral districts of Canada
