= Malaysia at the 1965 SEAP Games =

Malaysia at the 1965 Southeast Asian Peninsular Games
- IOC code: MAS
- NOC: Olympic Council of Malaysia
- Website: www.olympic.org.my (in English)

in Kuala Lumpur
- Competitors: 212 in 14 sports
- Medals Ranked 2nd: Gold 33 Silver 35 Bronze 29 Total 97

Southeast Asian Peninsular Games appearances
- 1959; 1961; 1965; 1967; 1969; 1971; 1973; 1975; 1977; 1979; 1981; 1983; 1985; 1987; 1989; 1991; 1993; 1995; 1997; 1999; 2001; 2003; 2005; 2007; 2009; 2011; 2013; 2015; 2017; 2019; 2021; 2023; 2025; 2027; 2029

Malaysia competed in the 1965 Southeast Asian Peninsular Games as the host nation in Kuala Lumpur from 14 to 21 December 1965. It won 33 gold, 26 silver and 28 bronze medals.

== Medal summary ==
=== Medals by sport ===
Sport	Gold	Silver	Bronze	Total	Rank
Athletics	19	14	9	42	1
Badminton	5	3	3	11	1
Basketball	1	0	1	2	2
Boxing	1	2	4	7	4
Cycling	1	5	1	7	3
Judo	0	2	0	2	4
Sepak takraw	1	0	0	1	1
Shooting	2	4	1	7	2
Swimming	0	1	4	5	5
Table tennis	2	1	1	4	3
Tennis	0	1	2	3	3
Weightlifting	1	2	3	6	2
Total	33	35	29	97	2

=== Medallists ===
Medal	Name	Sport	Event
Gold	Mani Jegathesan	Athletics	Men's 100 metres
Gold	Mani Jegathesan	Athletics	Men's 200 metres
Gold	Victor Asirvatham	Athletics	Men's 400 metres
Gold	Ramasamy Subramaniam	Athletics	Men's 800 metres
Gold	Ramasamy Subramaniam	Athletics	Men's 1500 metres
Gold	Dilbagh Singh Kler	Athletics	Men's 5000 metres
Gold	Dilbagh Singh Kler	Athletics	Men's 3000 metres steeplechase
Gold	Kamaruddin Maidin	Athletics	Men's long jump
Gold	Kamaruddin Maidin	Athletics	Men's triple jump
Gold	Nashatar Singh Sidhu	Athletics	Men's shot put
Gold	Danapal Naidu	Athletics	Men's discus throw
Gold	Nashatar Singh Sidhu	Athletics	Men's javelin throw
Gold	Mani Jegathesan; A. S. Nathan; Karu Selvaratnam; Victor Asirvatham	Athletics	Men's 4 × 400 metres relay
Gold	Mary Rajamani	Athletics	Women's 200 metres
Gold	Mary Rajamani	Athletics	Women's 400 metres
Gold	Mary Rajamani	Athletics	Women's 800 metres
Gold	Kueh Swee Hong	Athletics	Women's 80 metres hurdles
Gold	Mary Rajamani; Cheryl Dorall; Kueh Swee Hong; Freda Gonzales	Athletics	Women's 4 x 100 metres relay
Gold		Athletics	
Gold	Tan Aik Huang	Badminton	Men's singles
Gold	Rosalind Singha Ang	Badminton	Women's singles
Gold	Ng Boon Bee; Tan Yee Khan	Badminton	Men's doubles
Gold	Ng Boon Bee; Teh Siew Yong	Badminton	Mixed doubles
Gold	Malaysia national badminton team: Ng Boon Bee; Tan Yee Khan; Yew Cheng Hoe; Tan Aik Huang	Badminton	Men's team
Gold	Malaysia national basketball team	Basketball	
Gold		Boxing	
Gold	Shaharuddin Jaafar	Cycling	Men's 800 metre massed start individual
Gold		Sepak takraw	Men's tournament
Gold	Yap Pow Thong	Shooting	Clay pigeon individual
Gold	Patrick Lim; Yap Pow Thong	Shooting	Clay pigeon team
Gold	Ong Mei Mei	Table tennis	Women's singles
Gold		Table tennis	
Gold	Yap Meng Soon	Weightlifting	Men's middle heavyweight
Silver	Gunaratnam Rajalingam	Athletics	Men's 200 metres
Silver	T. Krishnan	Athletics	Men's 100 metres
Silver	A. S. Nathan	Athletics	Men's 400 metres
Silver	V. Velayuthan	Athletics	Men's 400 metres hurdles
Silver	Tan Ghee Lin	Athletics	Men's high jump
Silver	Ahmad Mahmud	Athletics	Men's long jump
Silver	F. Marciano	Athletics	Men's pole vault
Silver	Ghanda Singh	Athletics	Men's hammer throw
Silver	M. Dattaya	Athletics	Men's discus throw
Silver	Rajemah Sheikh Ahmad	Athletics	Women's 80 metres hurdles
Silver	Marie Nair	Athletics	Women's pentathlon
Silver		Athletics	
Silver		Athletics	
Silver		Athletics	
Silver	Rosalind Singha Ang; Teoh Siew Yong	Badminton	Women's doubles
Silver		Badminton	Mixed doubles
Silver	Malaysia national badminton team: Rosalind Singha Ang; Teoh Siew Yong; Silvia Tan; Ho Cheng Yoke	Badminton	Women's team
Silver	Malaysia national basketball team	Basketball	
Silver		Boxing	
Silver		Boxing	
Silver	Shaharuddin Jaafar	Cycling	Men's 1600 metre massed start individual
Silver	Ng Joo Pong	Cycling	Men's 4000 metre massed start individual
Silver	Choy Mow Thim	Cycling	Men's road massed start individual
Silver		Cycling	
Silver		Cycling	
Silver		Judo	
Silver		Judo	
Silver	Khadim Hussein	Shooting	Men's 25 metre centre fire
Silver		Shooting	
Silver		Shooting	
Silver		Shooting	
Silver		Swimming	
Silver		Table tennis	
Silver		Tennis	Women's team
Silver	Teo Tong Ann	Weightlifting	Men's light heavyweight
Silver	Harbans Singh	Weightlifting	Men's heavyweight
Bronze	Ahmad Mahmud	Athletics	Men's decathlon
Bronze	Mudliffah Yusof	Athletics	Women's high jump
Bronze	Wong Mong Yun	Athletics	Women's javelin throw
Bronze		Athletics	
Bronze		Athletics	
Bronze		Athletics	
Bronze		Athletics	
Bronze		Athletics	
Bronze		Athletics	
Bronze	Yew Cheng Hoe	Badminton	Men's singles
Bronze	Yew Cheng Hoe; Tan Aik Huang	Badminton	Men's doubles
Bronze	Silvia Tan; Ho Cheng Yoke	Badminton	Women's doubles
Bronze	T. Terenas	Boxing	Men's flyweight
Bronze	Raja Zainal Abidin	Boxing	Men's bantamweight
Bronze	Wan Hassan	Boxing	Men's featherweight
Bronze		Boxing	
Bronze	Choy Mow Thim	Cycling	Men's road massed start team
Bronze		Shooting	
Bronze	Chan Chee Seng	Swimming	Men's 400 metre freestyle
Bronze	Chan Chee Seng	Swimming	Men's 1500 metre freestyle
Bronze	Chong Teck Chong	Swimming	Men's 200 metre breaststroke
Bronze		Swimming	
Bronze		Table tennis	
Bronze		Tennis	Men's team
Bronze		Tennis	
Bronze	Chun Weng Woo	Weightlifting	Men's flyweight
Bronze	Cheah Tong Kim	Weightlifting	Men's middleweight
Bronze		Weightlifting	
