= Trần Văn Nên =

Vietnamese cyclist

Personal information
- Born: 6 August 1927
- Height: 168 cm (5 ft 6 in)
- Weight: 59 kg (130 lb)

Cycling career
- Sport: Cycling
Medal record
Men's road bicycle racing
Representing South Vietnam
Southeast Asian Games
Bronze medal – third place	1965 Kuala Lumpur	100 km road team trial

Trần Văn Nên (born 6 August 1927) is a former Vietnamese cyclist representing South Vietnam at international tournaments.

He won the bronze medal at the 1965 SEAP Games in Kuala Lumpur, Malaysia in the 100 km road team time trial.

He competed in the individual road race, individual pursuit, 1000m time trial and team time trial events at the 1964 Summer Olympics.
