= Phúc Thắng =

Phúc Thắng may refer to several places in Vietnam, including:

- Phúc Thắng, Vĩnh Phúc, a ward of Phúc Yên
- Phúc Thắng, Bắc Giang, a commune of Sơn Động District
