= Cycling at the 1965 SEAP Games =

The Cycling at the 1965 SEAP Games was held between 15 September to 18 December. Cycling track were held at the Merdeka Stadium, Kuala Lumpur.

== Medal summary ==
=== Men ===
Event	Gold		Silver		Bronze	
1000 m Individual road trial	(Cambodia) Tan Thol	1:14.4	(Malaysia) Ng Joo Pong	1:17.0	(Thailand) Pairote Roongtonkit	1:18.3
100 km road team trial	Thailand Pairote Roongtonkit; Smaisuk Krisansuwan; Chainarong Sophonpong; C. Varayout	2:51:15	Cambodia Ret Chhon; Yi Yuong; Van Son; Van Ung	2:53:18	South Vietnam Trần Văn Nen; Tranh Gia Chau; Bùi Văn Hoàng; Van Dam	2:53:34
800 m Individual massed	(Malaysia) Shaharuddin Jaafar	1:05.8	(South Vietnam) Nguyễn Văn Châu	1:05.8	(Thailand) Smaisuk Krisansuwan	1:06.2
1600 m Individual massed	(Thailand) Smaisuk Krisansuwan	2:35.7	(Malaysia) Shaharuddin Jaafar	2:35.7	(Thailand) Pairote Roongtonkit	2:35.8
4800 m Individual massed	(Cambodia) Yi Yuong	7:41.8	(South Vietnam) Tranh Gia Chau	7:42.8	(Cambodia) Tan Thol	7:42.9
10,000 m Individual massed	(Thailand) Dechapol	15:41.6	(Malaysia) Ng Joo Pong	15:41.7	(Cambodia) Danh Tanh Se	15:42.2
200 km Road massed individual	(South Vietnam) Trần Văn Nen	6:10:51.7	(Malaysia) Choy Mow Thim	6:10:52.2	(Thailand) Pairote Roongtonkit	6:10:53.5
4000 m Team pursuit	Thailand		Cambodia		South Vietnam	
Team Placing	Thailand Pairote Roongtonkit; Chainarong Sophonpong; Surivong	18:34:45.8	South Vietnam	18:34:46.9	Malaysia	18:54:04.3

== Medal table ==
Rank	Nation	Gold	Silver	Bronze	Total
1	Thailand (THA)	5	0	4	9
2	Cambodia (CAM)	2	2	2	6
3	Malaysia (MAS)	1	4	1	6
4	South Vietnam (VNM)	1	3	2	6
Totals (4 entries)		9	9	9	27
