= Ret Chhon =

Cambodian cyclist

Personal information
- Born: 1940 (age 85–86)

Cycling career
- Sport: Cycling
Medal record
Men's road bicycle racing
Representing Cambodia
Southeast Asian Games
Silver medal – second place	1965 Kuala Lumpur	100 km road team trial

Ret Chhon (born 1940) is a former Cambodian cyclist.

He won the silver medal at the 1965 SEAP Games in Kuala Lumpur, Malaysia in the 100 km road team time trial.

He competed in the team time trial at the 1964 Summer Olympics.
