= Jocelyne Girard-Bujold =

Canadian politician

Member of Parliament for Jonquière
- In office 2 June 1997 – 28 June 2004
- Preceded by: André Caron
- Succeeded by: riding dissolved

Personal details
- Born: 1 January 1943 (age 83) Arvida, Quebec
- Party: Bloc Québécois
- Profession: businessperson, political assistant

Jocelyne Girard-Bujold (born 1 January 1943) was a member of the House of Commons of Canada from 1997 to 2004. She is a businesswoman and political assistant by career.

Born in Arvida, Quebec, Girard-Bujold was elected in the Jonquière electoral district under the Bloc Québécois party in the 1997 and 2000 elections, serving in the 36th and 37th Canadian Parliaments respectively.

However, by the 2004 national election, the Jonquière riding had been redistributed. Girard-Bujold lost the Bloc Québécois nomination for the Jonquière—Alma electoral district to Sébastien Gagnon. She ran as an independent candidate in the election, but Gagnon won the riding.
