= Douglas Coldwell Layton Foundation =

Progressive Canadian think tank

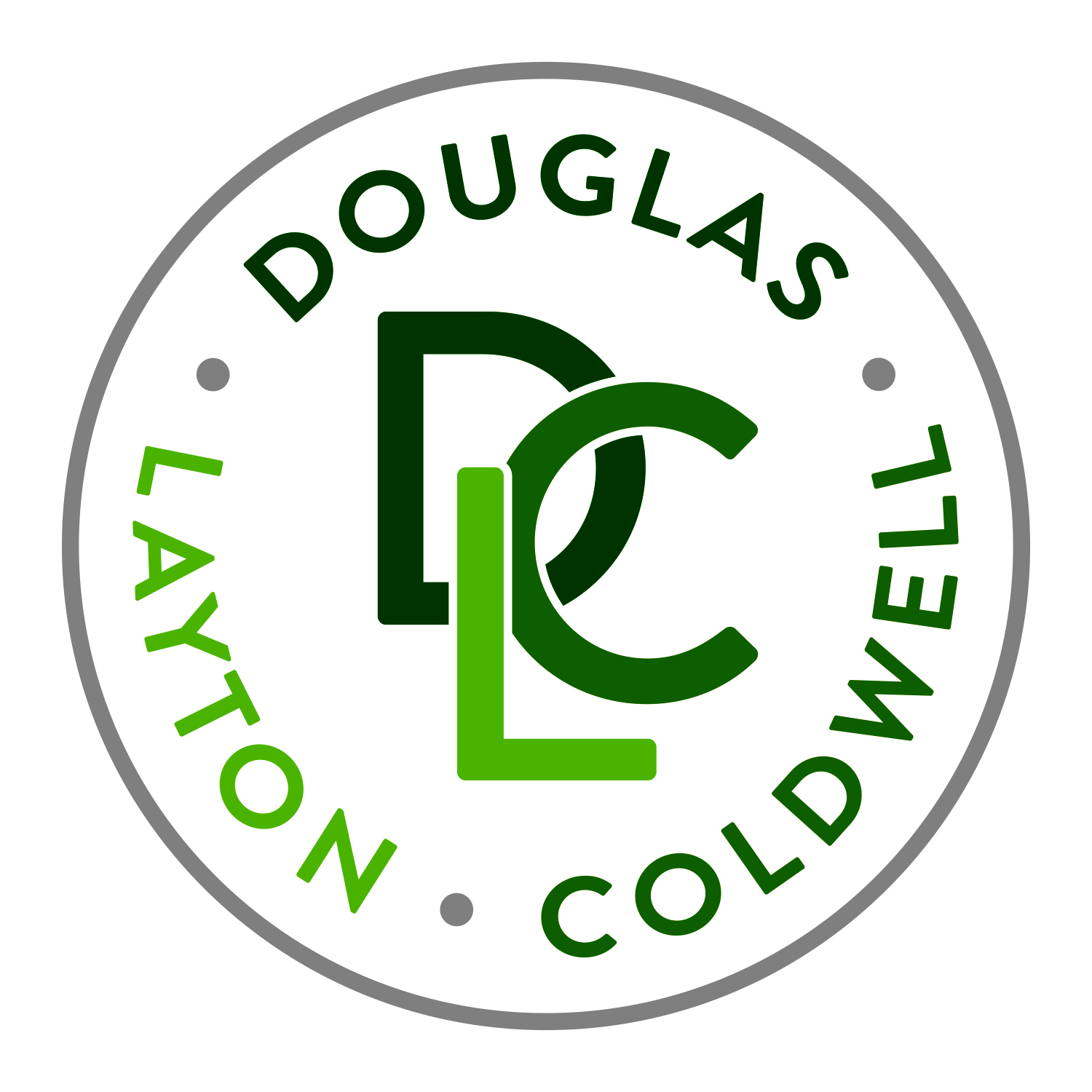
- Formation: 1971
- Founders: M. J. Coldwell; Tommy Douglas; Laurier LaPierre; Donald C. MacDonald; David Orlikow; Jim Renwick; Clifford Scott; Graham Spry
- Type: Think tank
- Legal status: Charitable organization
- Headquarters: Ottawa, Ontario, Canada
- Location: Canada
- President: Vacant
- Executive director: Josh Bizjak
- Website: douglascoldwelllayton.ca
- Formerly called: Douglas-Coldwell Foundation

The Douglas Coldwell Layton Foundation (formerly known as the Douglas-Coldwell Foundation) is a left-wing Canadian think tank devoted, in the words of its slogan, to "promoting education and research into social democracy". It was founded in 1971, and is based in Ottawa.

The foundation was initially named for and inspired by Tommy Douglas, the first federal leader of the New Democratic Party from 1961 to 1971, and M. J. Coldwell, leader of its predecessor Co-operative Commonwealth Federation from 1942 to 1960. Both had desired a Canadian counterpart to the Fabian Society.

In 1987, it merged with the Ontario Woodsworth Memorial Foundation of Toronto, named for Coldwell's predecessor as CCF leader, J. S. Woodsworth.

The foundation has underwritten biographies of Douglas, Coldwell, Clarence Gillis, Stanley Knowles, and Grace MacInnis, and scholarships and lectureships at Canadian post-secondary institutions. The foundation also gives out yearly grants totalling up to $25,000 for projects supporting its mandate of "promoting education and research in social democracy".

The foundation is a registered charitable foundation, contributions to which are tax-deductible in Canada; it accepts memberships and solicits donations from individuals and organizations in the general public. While predominantly associated with NDP members and activists, and concerned in part with the history and future of the party, it is an independent group with no administrative connection to any political party.

Tommy Douglas was the foundation's first president. Trade unionist Kalmen Kaplansky led the think tank in the 1980s and 1990s. Tessa Hebb served as president from 1995 to 2005, followed by David Mackenzie, David White and David Mackenzie again until 2016. Former NDP senior advisor Karl Bélanger became president of the foundation in November 2016.

In January 2022, the foundation changed its name to the Douglas Coldwell Layton Foundation to honour the deceased federal NDP Leader Jack Layton.

== Presidents ==
- 1971–1973: Laurier Lapierre
- c. 1973 – 1986: Tommy Douglas
- 1980s–1997: Kalmen Kaplansky
- 1997–2007: Tessa Hebb
- 2007–2014: David Mackenzie
- 2014–2016: David White
- 2016: David Mackenzie
- 2016–2022: Karl Bélanger
- 2022–2026: Irene Mathyssen
