= Quảng Minh =

Quảng Minh may refer to several rural communes in Vietnam, including:

- Quảng Minh, Thanh Hóa, a commune of Sầm Sơn
- Quảng Minh, Quảng Bình, a commune of Ba Đồn
- Quảng Minh, Quảng Ninh, a commune of Hải Hà District
- Quảng Minh, Bắc Giang, a commune of Việt Yên District

== See also ==
- Quang Minh (disambiguation)
