= Gilles Marceau =

Canadian politician

Member of Parliament for Lapointe
- In office 1968–1979
- Preceded by: Gilles Grégoire
- Succeeded by: riding redistributed

Member of Parliament for Jonquière
- In office 1979–1984
- Preceded by: riding created
- Succeeded by: Jean-Pierre Blackburn

Personal details
- Born: 27 September 1928 Quebec City, Quebec
- Died: 19 April 2008 (aged 79)
- Party: Liberal
- Profession: lawyer

Gilles Marceau (27 September 1928 – 19 April 2008) was a Canadian politician. He was a former mayor of Jonquière and a Liberal Party member of the House of Commons of Canada.

Marceau was born in 1928 in Quebec City. A lawyer by profession, he was first elected at the Lapointe electoral district in the 1968 federal election, then re-elected in 1972, 1974, 1979 and 1980. Marceau served five successive terms from the 28th through 32nd Canadian Parliaments first for Lapointe, then in the Jonquière riding after riding boundaries were rearranged in 1976.

Marceau left national politics after his defeat in the 1984 election to Jean-Pierre Blackburn of the Progressive Conservative party.

On 6 November 2009 the Jonquière Tax Center, originally opened in 1983, was designated the "Gilles Marceau Building" in honor of the late politician.
