= Sơn Động district =

Coordinates: 21.3333°N 106.8500°E

Sơn Động district Huyện Sơn Động
- District
- Seal

- Location within Vietnam Location within Southeast Asia Location within Asia
- Country: Vietnam
- Province: Bắc Giang
- Founded: 1909
- Capital: An Châu

Government
  - Secretary: Ngụy Văn Tuyên
  - Party Secretary: Nghiêm Xuân Hưởng
  - People's Council Chairman: Nguyễn Quang Ngạn; Đỗ Văn Cầm
  - People's Committee Chairman: Hoàng My Ca; Hoàng Văn Trọng

Area
  - District: 32,655 sq mi (84,577 km^{2})

Population (2018)
  - District: 72,350
  - Density: 220/sq mi (86/km^{2})
  - Urban: 15,375
- Time zone: UTC+7 (Indochina Time)
- Website: sondong.bacgiang.gov.vn

Sơn Động is a former rural district of Bắc Giang province in the Northeast region of Vietnam. It is the easternmost district in the province. As of 2018 it had a population of 72,350. The district covers an area of 844 km^{2}. The district capital lies at An Châu. There are some cultural sites here such as: Chẽ pagoda, Female King temple, Lục Liễu temple, Đặng temple and Chẽ temple.

== Administrative divisions ==
The district is divided administratively into two townships, An Châu (district capital) and Tây Yên Tử, and the communes of: Hữu Sản, An Lạc, Vân Sơn, Lệ Viễn, Vĩnh An, Dương Hưu, Long Sơn, An Bá, Yên Định, Tuấn Đạo, Thanh Luận, Cẩm Đàn, Giáo Liêm, Đại Sơn and Phúc Sơn.

121.72 km² in the southern portion of the district has been designated as the Tây Yên Tử Nature Reserve.

== Climate ==
Climate data for Sơn Động
| Month | Jan | Feb | Mar | Apr | May | Jun | Jul | Aug | Sep | Oct | Nov | Dec | Year |
|---|---|---|---|---|---|---|---|---|---|---|---|---|---|
| Record high °C (°F) | 31.6 (88.9) | 35.7 (96.3) | 37.0 (98.6) | 39.3 (102.7) | 41.0 (105.8) | 41.1 (106.0) | 39.4 (102.9) | 39.2 (102.6) | 37.7 (99.9) | 34.8 (94.6) | 33.5 (92.3) | 30.9 (87.6) | 41.1 (106.0) |
| Mean daily maximum °C (°F) | 20.1 (68.2) | 21.0 (69.8) | 23.7 (74.7) | 28.0 (82.4) | 31.9 (89.4) | 32.9 (91.2) | 32.9 (91.2) | 32.4 (90.3) | 31.6 (88.9) | 29.4 (84.9) | 26.0 (78.8) | 22.5 (72.5) | 27.7 (81.9) |
| Daily mean °C (°F) | 15.4 (59.7) | 17.0 (62.6) | 20.0 (68.0) | 24.0 (75.2) | 27.0 (80.6) | 28.2 (82.8) | 28.3 (82.9) | 27.6 (81.7) | 26.4 (79.5) | 23.8 (74.8) | 20.2 (68.4) | 16.6 (61.9) | 22.9 (73.2) |
| Mean daily minimum °C (°F) | 12.3 (54.1) | 14.3 (57.7) | 17.4 (63.3) | 21.1 (70.0) | 23.6 (74.5) | 25.0 (77.0) | 25.1 (77.2) | 24.7 (76.5) | 23.3 (73.9) | 20.3 (68.5) | 16.4 (61.5) | 12.8 (55.0) | 19.7 (67.5) |
| Record low °C (°F) | −2.8 (27.0) | 1.3 (34.3) | 3.0 (37.4) | 10.6 (51.1) | 15.0 (59.0) | 17.1 (62.8) | 20.0 (68.0) | 21.1 (70.0) | 14.5 (58.1) | 8.0 (46.4) | 3.6 (38.5) | −1.2 (29.8) | −2.8 (27.0) |
| Average precipitation mm (inches) | 28.6 (1.13) | 23.2 (0.91) | 40.5 (1.59) | 99.6 (3.92) | 194.3 (7.65) | 233.6 (9.20) | 314.6 (12.39) | 305.0 (12.01) | 187.1 (7.37) | 95.0 (3.74) | 37.7 (1.48) | 20.4 (0.80) | 1,579.7 (62.19) |
| Average rainy days | 7.5 | 8.2 | 10.6 | 10.4 | 12.7 | 16.4 | 17.0 | 18.9 | 13.7 | 8.9 | 6.5 | 5.3 | 136.3 |
| Average relative humidity (%) | 78.8 | 80.3 | 81.7 | 81.1 | 79.2 | 81.5 | 82.7 | 85.1 | 83.8 | 81.1 | 79.2 | 77.7 | 81.0 |
| Mean monthly sunshine hours | 67.2 | 52.9 | 52.5 | 91.0 | 174.1 | 160.8 | 172.3 | 155.2 | 153.7 | 146.2 | 127.6 | 109.0 | 1,470.8 |
Source: Vietnam Institute for Building Science and Technology, Nchmf.gov.vn (July-August record high)
