= Weightlifting at the 1964 Summer Olympics – Men's 67.5 kg =

Weightlifting at the Olympics

Men's 67.5 kg at the Games of the XVIII Olympiad
- Venue: Shibuya Public Hall
- Date: 13 October 1964
- Competitors: 20 from 18 nations
- Winning total: 432.5 kg WR

Medalists
1st place, gold medalist(s)		Waldemar Baszanowski	Poland
2nd place, silver medalist(s)		Vladimir Kaplunov	Soviet Union
3rd place, bronze medalist(s)		Marian Zieliński	Poland

The men's 67.5 kg weightlifting competitions at the 1964 Summer Olympics in Tokyo took place on 13 October at the Shibuya Public Hall. It was the tenth appearance of the lightweight class.

== Results ==
Rank	Name	Country	kg
1	Waldemar Baszanowski	Poland	432.5
2	Vladimir Kaplunov	Soviet Union	432.5
3	Marian Zieliński	Poland	420.0
4	Tony Garcy	United States	412.5
5	Zdeněk Otáhal	Czechoslovakia	400.0
6	Hiroshi Yamazaki	Japan	397.5
7	Parviz Jalayer	Iran	395.0
8	Alfred Kornprobst	United Team of Germany	385.0
9	Saleh Hussain	Egypt	382.5
10	Mahmoud Rashid	Iraq	367.5
11	Hugo Gittens	Trinidad and Tobago	367.5
12	Aziz Abbas	Iraq	365.0
13	Mya Thein	Burma	360.0
14	Philippe Lab	Switzerland	360.0
15	Bogomil Petrov	Bulgaria	357.5
16	Sven-Erik Westlin	Sweden	352.5
17	Rudy Monk	Netherlands Antilles	350.0
18	Niras Haroon	Thailand	337.5
19	Boo Kim Siang	Malaysia	335.0
AC	Yeh Juei-feng	Chinese Taipei	DNF
