= Mahmoud Rashid =

Iraqi weightlifter

Personal information
- Nationality: Iraqi
- Born: 4 December 1942 (age 82)

Sport
- Sport: Weightlifting

Mahmoud Rashid (born 4 December 1942) is an Iraqi weightlifter. He competed in the men's lightweight event at the 1964 Summer Olympics.
