= Thảo Nguyên =

Thảo Nguyên Phường Thảo Nguyên
- Ward
- Interactive map of Thảo Nguyên
- Country: Vietnam
- Regions: Northwest
- Province: Sơn La Province
- Established: June 16, 2025

Area
  - Total: 53.09 km^{2} (20.50 sq mi)

Population (2025)
  - Total: 22,479
  - Density: 423.4/km^{2} (1,097/sq mi)
- Time zone: UTC+07:00 (Indochina Time)

Thảo Nguyên is a ward (phường) of Sơn La Province, Vietnam.

== Geography ==
Thảo Nguyên Ward located in southeastern Sơn La Province, and adjacent to:

- Tân Yên Commune to the north
- Vân Sơn Ward to the south
- Mộc Châu Ward and Mộc Sơn Ward to the west
- Đoàn Kết Commune to the east.

== History ==
Administrative map of Thảo Nguyên Ward

On June 16, 2025, the Standing Committee of the National Assembly of Vietnam issued Resolution No. 1681/NQ-UBTVQH15 on the arrangement of commune-level administrative units of Sơn La Province in 2025 (effective from June 16, 2025). Accordingly, the entire land area and population of Cờ Đỏ Ward and Thảo Nguyên Ward were merged to form a new ward named Thảo Nguyên Ward.
