= Yeh Juei-feng =

Taiwanese weightlifter

Personal information
- Nationality: Taiwanese
- Born: 18 March 1938 (age 87)

Sport
- Sport: Weightlifting

Yeh Juei-feng (born 18 March 1938) is a Taiwanese weightlifter. He competed in the men's lightweight event at the 1964 Summer Olympics.
