= Augustin Brassard =

Canadian politician

Member of the Canadian Parliament for Lapointe
- In office 1957–1962
- Preceded by: Fernand Girard
- Succeeded by: Gilles Grégoire

Personal details
- Born: July 16, 1922 Roberval, Quebec, Canada
- Died: December 26, 1971 (aged 49)
- Party: Liberal
- Occupation: lawyer, secretary, teacher

Augustin Brassard (July 16, 1922 – December 26, 1971) was a Canadian politician, lawyer, secretary and teacher. He was born in Roberval, Quebec, Canada. He was elected to the House of Commons of Canada in the 1957 election as a Member of the Liberal Party to represent the riding of Lapointe. He was re-elected in the 1958 election and defeated in 1962.
