= Vladimir Kaplunov =

Russian weightlifter (1933–2015)

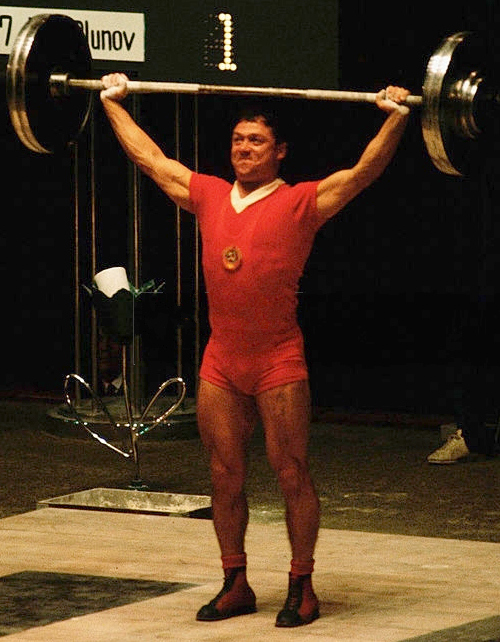
- Vladimir Kaplunov at the 1964 Olympics

Personal information
- Born: 2 March 1933 Kryukovo, Krasnoyarsk Krai, Russian SFSR, Soviet Union
- Died: 2015 (aged 81–82)
- Height: 1.60 m (5 ft 3 in)
- Weight: 67 kg (148 lb)

Sport
- Sport: Weightlifting
- Club: Soviet Army, Khabarovsk
Medal record
Representing the Soviet Union
Olympic Games
Silver medal – second place	1964 Tokyo	-67.5 kg
World Championships
Gold medal – first place	1962 Budapest	-67.5 kg
Bronze medal – third place	1963 Stockholm	-67.5 kg
Silver medal – second place	1964 Tokyo	-67.5 kg
Bronze medal – third place	1965 Teheran	-67.5 kg
European Championships
Gold medal – first place	1962 Budapest	-67.5 kg
Bronze medal – third place	1963 Stockholm	-67.5 kg
Gold medal – first place	1964 Moscow	-67.5 kg
Silver medal – second place	1965 Sofia	-67.5 kg

Vladimir Iosifovich Kaplunov (Russian: Владимир Иосифович Каплунов; 2 March 1933 – 2015) was a Russian weightlifter. He won a world title in 1962 and a silver medal at the 1964 Olympics.

In 1961 Kaplunov finished second at the Soviet lightweight championships and was included to the national team. Next years he won the Soviet title, and repeated this achievement in 1963 and 1964. He also won European titles in 1962 and 1964 and a world title in 1962. In 1966 Kaplunov switched to the middleweight category, but finished only third at the national championships. During his career Kaplunov set ten lightweight world records, five in the press, two in the clean and jerk, and three in the total, as well as two middleweight records, both in press. After retiring from competitions Kaplunov worked as a weightlifting coach in Odintsovo, Moscow Oblast.
