= Vân Sơn, Sơn La =

Ward in Sơn La province, Vietnam

Vân Sơn Phường Vân Sơn
- Ward
- Interactive map of Vân Sơn
- Country: Vietnam
- Regions: Northwest
- Province: Sơn La Province
- Established: June 16, 2025

Area
  - Total: 39.61 km^{2} (15.29 sq mi)

Population (2025)
  - Total: 15,917
  - Density: 401.8/km^{2} (1,041/sq mi)
- Time zone: UTC+07:00 (Indochina Time)

Vân Sơn is a ward (phường) of Sơn La Province, Vietnam.

== Geography ==
Vân Sơn Ward located in southeastern Sơn La Province, and adjacent to:

- Thảo Nguyên Ward and Đoàn Kết Commune to the north
- Vân Hồ Commune to the south
- Mộc Sơn Ward to the west
- Tô Múa Commune to the east.

== History ==
On June 16, 2025, the Standing Committee of the National Assembly of Vietnam issued Resolution No. 1681/NQ-UBTVQH15 on the arrangement of commune-level administrative units of Sơn La Province in 2025 (effective from June 16, 2025). Accordingly, the entire land area and population of Bình Minh Ward and Vân Sơn Ward were merged to form a new ward named Vân Sơn Ward.
