= Bogomil Petrov =

Bulgarian weightlifter

Personal information
- Nationality: Bulgarian
- Born: 20 November 1939 (age 85)

Sport
- Sport: Weightlifting

Bogomil Petrov (Bulgarian: Богомил Петров, born 20 November 1939) is a Bulgarian weightlifter. He competed in the men's lightweight event at the 1964 Summer Olympics.
