= Lapointe (electoral district) =

Former federal electoral district in Quebec, Canada

Quebec electoral district

Defunct federal electoral district
- Legislature: House of Commons
- District created: 1947
- District abolished: 1976
- First contested: 1949
- Last contested: 1974

Lapointe (French pronunciation: [lapwɛ̃t]) was a federal electoral district in Quebec, Canada that was represented in the House of Commons of Canada from 1949 to 1979.

This riding was created in 1947 from parts of Chicoutimi riding. It consisted of the city of Arvida and the towns of Kénogami and Jonquière and the western part of the county of Chicoutimi.

The electoral district was abolished in 1976 when it was redistributed into Jonquière and Lac-Saint-Jean ridings.

== Members of Parliament ==
This riding elected the following members of Parliament:

Parliament	Years	Member	Party
Lapointe; Riding created from Chicoutimi
21st	1949–1953	Jules Gauthier	Liberal
22nd	1953–1957	Fernand Girard	Independent
22nd	1957–1958	Augustin Brassard	Liberal
23rd	1958–1962	Augustin Brassard	Liberal
24th	1962–1963	Gilles Grégoire	Social Credit
25th	1963–1965	Gilles Grégoire	Social Credit
26th	1965–1968	Gilles Grégoire	Ralliement créditiste
27th	1968–1972	Gilles Marceau	Liberal
28th	1972–1974	Gilles Marceau	Liberal
29th	1974–1979	Gilles Marceau	Liberal
Riding dissolved into Jonquière and Lac-Saint-Jean

== Election results ==
1949 Canadian federal election
Party	Candidate	Votes
Liberal	Jules Gauthier	10,275
Independent	Lorenzo Deschenes	5,797
Union des électeurs	Pierre Bouchard	4,730

1953 Canadian federal election
Party	Candidate	Votes
Independent	Fernand Girard	11,854
Liberal	Joseph-Onésiphore Fraser	8,708
Progressive Conservative	Claude Gagnon	1,640

1957 Canadian federal election
Party	Candidate	Votes
Liberal	Augustin Brassard	13,671
Independent	Fernand Girard	12,363

1958 Canadian federal election
Party	Candidate	Votes
Liberal	Augustin Brassard	12,113
Progressive Conservative	Bernard Wilshire	9,864
Co-operative Commonwealth	Michel Chartrand	7,042

1962 Canadian federal election
Party	Candidate	Votes
Social Credit	Gilles Gregoire	16,186
Liberal	Augustin Brassard	11,245
Progressive Conservative	Henri Vaillancourt	2,524

1963 Canadian federal election
Party	Candidate	Votes
Social Credit	Gilles Gregoire	13,312
Liberal	René Coté	8,506
Progressive Conservative	Henri Vaillancourt	3,474
New Democratic	Henri Vachon	2,857

1965 Canadian federal election
Party	Candidate	Votes
Ralliement créditiste	Gilles Gregoire	13,210
Liberal	Paul Labrie	9,733
Progressive Conservative	Louis Reid	2,658
New Democratic	Louis-Philippe Trinque	1,028

1968 Canadian federal election
Party	Candidate	Votes
Liberal	Gilles Marceau	11,821
Progressive Conservative	Alphonse Laliberté	8,077
Ralliement créditiste	Gérard Lacombe	4,324
New Democratic	Louis-Philippe Trinque	919

1972 Canadian federal election
Party	Candidate	Votes
Liberal	Gilles Marceau	16,423
Social Credit	Raymond Langlois	6,934
Progressive Conservative	Léopold Bergeron	4,042
Independent	Pierre-Hugues Richard	1,084

1974 Canadian federal election
Party	Candidate	Votes
Liberal	Gilles Marceau	16,673
Social Credit	François Rondeau	6,466
Progressive Conservative	Gaston Dion	1,982
New Democratic	Réal Caron	1,587
Marxist–Leninist	Daniel Verdi	227

== See also ==
- List of Canadian electoral districts
- Historical federal electoral districts of Canada
