= Philippe Lab =

Swiss weightlifter

Personal information
- Nationality: Swiss
- Born: 13 July 1941 (age 83)

Sport
- Sport: Weightlifting

Philippe Lab (born 13 July 1941) is a Swiss weightlifter. He competed in the men's lightweight event at the 1964 Summer Olympics.
