= L'Ascension-de-Notre-Seigneur =

- Parish municipality
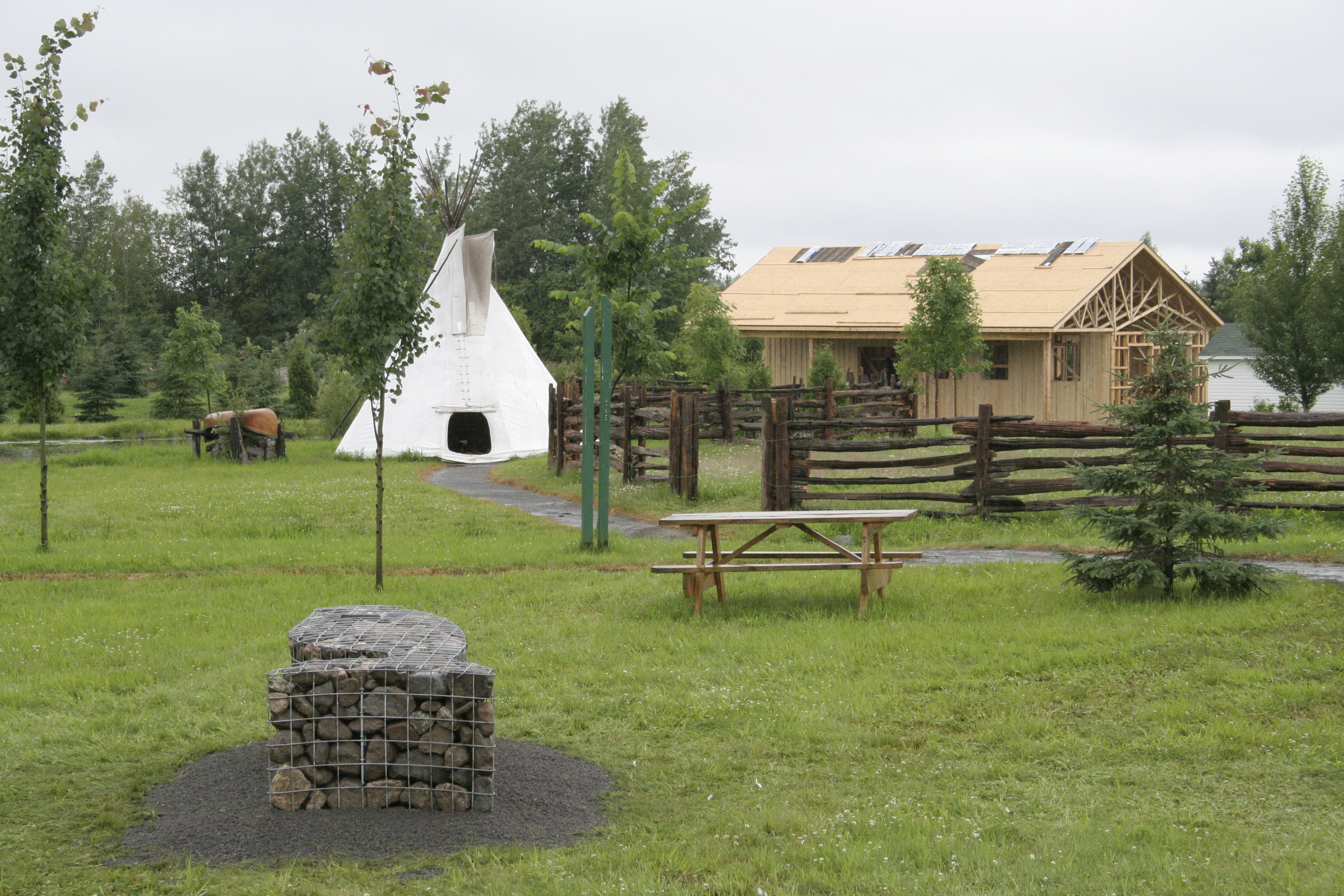

- Location in Saguenay–Lac-Saint-Jean Quebec.
- Coordinates: 48°42′N 71°41′W
- Country: Canada
- Province: Quebec
- Region: Saguenay–Lac-Saint-Jean
- RCM: Lac-Saint-Jean-Est
- Settled: 1896
- Constituted: February 25, 1919

Government
  - Mayor: Louis Ouellet
  - Federal riding: Jonquière—Hébertville—Pays-des-Bleuets
  - Prov. riding: Lac-Saint-Jean

Area
  - Total: 132.50 km^{2} (51.16 sq mi)
  - Land: 130.84 km^{2} (50.52 sq mi)

Population (2021)
  - Total: 2,079
  - Density: 15.9/km^{2} (41/sq mi)
  - Pop 2016-2021: ▲4.6%
  - Dwellings: 985
- Time zone: UTC−5 (EST)
  - Summer (DST): UTC−4 (EDT)
- Postal code(s): G0W 1Y0
- Area codes: 418 and 581
- Highways: No major routes
- Website: www.ville.ascension.qc.ca

L'Ascension-de-Notre-Seigneur (French pronunciation: [lasɑ̃sjɔ̃ də nɔtʁ sɛɲœʁ]) is a parish municipality in Quebec, Canada, located within the regional county municipality of Lac-Saint-Jean-Est in the Saguenay-Lac-Saint-Jean region. Its name is French for "the Ascension of Our Lord".

The municipality had a population of 2,079 in the 2021 Canadian Census.

== History ==
The area opened for colonization in 1896, and the parish was formed on June 8, 1916. In 1919, the place was incorporated, taking the parish's name.

== Demographics ==
In the 2021 Census of Population conducted by Statistics Canada, L'Ascension-de-Notre-Seigneur had a population of 2,079 living in 855 of its 985 total private dwellings, a change of 4.6% from its 2016 population of 1,987. With a land area of 130.84 km^{2} (50.52 sq mi), it had a population density of 15.9/km^{2} (41.2/sq mi) in 2021.

Population trend:

- Population in 2021: 2,079 (2016 to 2021 population change: 4.6%)
- Population in 2016: 1,987
- Population in 2011: 1,983
- Population in 2006: 1,976
- Population in 2001: 1,933
- Population in 1996: 1,867
- Population in 1991: 1,823
- Population in 1986: 1,845
- Population in 1981: 1,701
- Population in 1976: 1,511
- Population in 1971: 1,474
- Population in 1966: 1,637
- Population in 1961: 1,742
- Population in 1956: 1,678
- Population in 1951: 1,578
- Population in 1941: 912
- Population in 1931: 801
- Population in 1921: 702

Mother tongue:

- English as first language: 0.7%
- French as first language: 99.3%
- English and French as first language: 0.2%
- Other as first language: 0.2%

== See also ==
- List of parish municipalities in Quebec
