= Jonquière—Hébertville—Pays-des-Bleuets =

Federal electoral district in Quebec, Canada

Quebec electoral district
- Interactive map of riding boundaries from the 2025 federal election

Federal electoral district
- Legislature: House of Commons
MP
Mario Simard
Bloc Québécois
- District created: 2013
- First contested: 2015
- Last contested: 2021
- District webpage: profile, map

Demographics
- Population (2016): 87,596
- Electors (2019): 72,713
- Area (km²): 42,453
- Pop. density (per km²): 2.1
- Census division(s): Le Fjord-du-Saguenay, Lac-Saint-Jean-Est, Saguenay
- Census subdivision(s): Saguenay (part), Hébertville, Saint-Ambroise, L'Ascension-de-Notre-Seigneur, Saint-Nazaire, Larouche, Labrecque, Sainte-Jeanne-d'Arc, Bégin, Saint-Charles-de-Bourget

Jonquière—Hébertville—Pays-des-Bleuets (previously Jonquière, French pronunciation: [ʒɔ̃kjɛʁ ebɛʁvil pɛi de bløɛ]) is a federal electoral district in Quebec, Canada, that was represented in the House of Commons of Canada from 1979 to 2004 and again from the 2015 election onward.

== Demographics ==
According to the 2021 Canadian census, 2023 representation order

Race: 94.8% White, 4.0% Indigenous
Languages: 98.8% French, 1.1% English
Religions: 79.3% Christian (72.9% Catholic, 6.4% Other), 20.3% None
Median income: $42,000 (2020)
Average income: $48,720 (2020)

== History ==
This riding was created in 1976 from parts of Lapointe and Montmorency ridings. It was abolished in 2003 when it was redistributed into Jonquière—Alma and Chicoutimi—Le Fjord ridings. It was re-created during the 2012 electoral redistribution from parts of Jonquière—Alma, Chicoutimi—Le Fjord and Roberval—Lac-Saint-Jean.

Following the 2022 Canadian federal electoral redistribution, the riding lost the municipalities of Saint-David-de-Falardeau, Sainte-Rose-du-Nord, Saint-Fulgence, and Saint-Honoré to Chicoutimi—Le Fjord, and gained the municipalities of Hébertville, Hébertville-Station, L'Ascension-de-Notre-Seigneur, Saint-Augustin, Saint-Bruno, Sainte-Jeanne-d'Arc, Saint-Eugène-d'Argentenay, Saint-Ludger-de-Milot and Saint-Stanislas as well as the Passes-Dangereuses unorganized area from Lac-Saint-Jean.

In 2026, the riding's name was changed from Jonquière to Jonquière—Hébertville—Pays-des-Bleuets as part of Bill C-25 of the 45th Canadian Parliament.

=== Members of Parliament ===
This riding elected the following members of Parliament:

Parliament	Years	Member	Party
Jonquière; Riding created from Lapointe and Montmorency
31st	1979–1980	Gilles Marceau	Liberal
32nd	1980–1984	Gilles Marceau	Liberal
33rd	1984–1988	Jean-Pierre Blackburn	Progressive Conservative
34th	1988–1993	Jean-Pierre Blackburn	Progressive Conservative
35th	1993–1997	André Caron	Bloc Québécois
36th	1997–2000	Jocelyne Girard-Bujold	Bloc Québécois
37th	2000–2004	Jocelyne Girard-Bujold	Bloc Québécois
Riding dissolved into Chicoutimi—Le Fjord and Jonquière—Alma
Riding re-created from Jonquière—Alma, Chicoutimi—Le Fjord and Roberval—Lac-Saint-Jean
42nd	2015–2019	Karine Trudel	New Democratic
43rd	2019–2021	Mario Simard	Bloc Québécois
44th	2021–2025	Mario Simard	Bloc Québécois
45th	2025–present	Mario Simard	Bloc Québécois

== Election results ==
=== 2015–present ===
View source data.
Graph of election results in Jonquière (since 2011, minor parties that never got 2% of the vote or didn't run consistently are omitted)

2025 Canadian federal election: Jonquière
Party	Candidate	Votes	%	±%	Expenditures
Bloc Québécois	Mario Simard	20,247	39.99	–3.12	$24,621.01
Conservative	Fanny Boulanger	15,314	30.25	+1.94	$100,026.54
Liberal	William Van Tassel	13,172	26.02	+5.22	$5,122.94
New Democratic	Lise Garon	932	1.84	–3.53	$1,476.92
People's	Patrick Gaudreault	516	1.02	N/A	$1,241.73
Green	Marie-Josée Yelle	448	0.88	–0.81	$0.00
Total valid votes/expenses limit		50,629	98.41	+0.95	$153,802.00
Total rejected ballots		817	1.59	–0.95	
Turnout		51,446	67.98	+4.86	
Eligible voters		75,676			
Bloc Québécois notional hold		Swing		–2.53	
Source: Elections Canada
Note: number of eligible voters does not include voting day registrations.

2021 federal election redistributed results
Party	Vote	%
Bloc Québécois	19,687	43.11
Conservative	12,926	28.31
Liberal	9,496	20.80
New Democratic	2,452	5.37
Green	774	1.70
Rhinoceros	328	0.72
Total valid votes	45,663	97.46
Rejected ballots	1,190	2.54
Registered voters/ estimated turnout	74,231	63.12

2021 Canadian federal election: Jonquière
Party	Candidate	Votes	%	±%	Expenditures
Bloc Québécois	Mario Simard	19,036	41.9	+6.3	$21,445.47
Conservative	Louise Gravel	13,223	29.1	+8.2	$28,273.75
Liberal	Stéphane Bégin	9,546	21.0	+5.1	$15,443.09
New Democratic	Marieve Ruel	2,559	5.6	-19.0	$1,358.35
Green	Marie-Josée Yelle	738	1.6	-0.4	$0.00
Rhinoceros	Line Bélanger	372	0.8	N/A	$0.00
Total valid votes/expense limit		45,474	97.5	–	$127,988.39
Total rejected ballots		1,188	2.5		
Turnout		46,662	63.2		
Registered voters		73,830			
Bloc Québécois hold		Swing		-1.9	
Source: Elections Canada

2019 Canadian federal election: Jonquière
Party	Candidate	Votes	%	±%	Expenditures
Bloc Québécois	Mario Simard	17,577	35.6	+12.31	$11,695.16
New Democratic	Karine Trudel	12,141	24.6	-4.59	$58,005.08
Conservative	Philippe Gagnon	10,338	20.9	+4.01	$52,967.51
Liberal	Vincent Garneau	7,849	15.9	-12.58	$42,992.12
Green	Lyne Bourdages	1,009	2.0	+0.64	$0.00
People's	Sylvie Théodore	453	0.9		$1,360.01
Total valid votes/expense limit		49,367	100.0		
Total rejected ballots		999			
Turnout		50,366	69.3		
Eligible voters		72,713			
Bloc Québécois gain from New Democratic		Swing		+8.45	
Source: Elections Canada

2015 Canadian federal election
Party	Candidate	Votes	%	±%	Expenditures
New Democratic	Karine Trudel	14,039	29.19	-13.31	$73,851.56
Liberal	Marc Pettersen	13,700	28.48	+25.77	$11,172.02
Bloc Québécois	Jean-François Caron	11,202	23.29	+4.03	$40,340.00
Conservative	Ursula Larouche	8,124	16.89	-17.24	$43,411.16
Green	Carmen Budilean	656	1.36	+0.07	–
Rhinoceros	Marielle Couture	382	0.79	+0.68	–
Total valid votes/Expense limit		48,103	100.0		$244,585.34
Total rejected ballots		899	–	–	
Turnout		49,002	–	–	
Eligible voters		72,605			
New Democratic hold		Swing		-19.54	
Source: Elections Canada

2011 federal election redistributed results
Party	Vote	%
New Democratic	19,829	42.50
Conservative	15,926	34.13
Bloc Québécois	8,985	19.26
Liberal	1,265	2.71
Green	600	1.29
Rhinoceros	51	0.11

=== 1979–2004 ===
2000 Canadian federal election
Party	Candidate	Votes
Bloc Québécois	Jocelyne Girard-Bujold	16,189
Liberal	Jean-Guy Boily	11,574
Alliance	Sylvain Néron	3,428
New Democratic	Michel Deraiche	1,139

1997 Canadian federal election
Party	Candidate	Votes
Bloc Québécois	Jocelyne Girard-Bujold	16,415
Progressive Conservative	Daniel Giguère	11,808
Liberal	Martial Guay	4,874
New Democratic	Carmel Bélanger	353
Natural Law	Normand Dufour	348

1993 Canadian federal election
Party	Candidate	Votes
Bloc Québécois	André Caron	25,061
Progressive Conservative	Jean-Pierre Blackburn	6,637
Liberal	Gilles Savard	4,519
Natural Law	Normand Dufour	435
New Democratic	Karl Bélanger	410

1988 Canadian federal election
Party	Candidate	Votes
Progressive Conservative	Jean-Pierre Blackburn	21,523
New Democratic	Françoise Gauthier	7,026
Liberal	Laval Tremblay	5,277

1984 Canadian federal election
Party	Candidate	Votes
Progressive Conservative	Jean-Pierre Blackburn	18,217
Liberal	Gilles Marceau	14,088
New Democratic	Jean Malaison	1,870
Parti nationaliste	Magella Archibald	1,620
Rhinoceros	Richard Boudrias Bouchard	905

1980 Canadian federal election
Party	Candidate	Votes
Liberal	Gilles Marceau	22,202
New Democratic	Jacques Hubert	4,444
Social Credit	Harold Lévesque	1,315
Progressive Conservative	Marcel Mireault	1,126
Union populaire	Luc Trottier	380
Marxist–Leninist	John J. Walsh	127

1979 Canadian federal election
Party	Candidate	Votes
Liberal	Gilles Marceau	21,969
Social Credit	Jean Maurice Colombe	7,596
New Democratic	Jacques Hubert	2,724
Progressive Conservative	Gaston Dion	1,597
Rhinoceros	Alain-Arthur Painchaud	1,069
Marxist–Leninist	John Joseph Walsh	75

== See also ==
- List of Canadian electoral districts
- Historical federal electoral districts of Canada
