= Saleh Hussain =

Egyptian weightlifter

Personal information
- Nationality: Egyptian
- Born: 12 October 1936 (age 88)

Sport
- Sport: Weightlifting

Saleh Hussain (born 12 October 1936) is an Egyptian weightlifter. He competed in the men's lightweight event at the 1964 Summer Olympics.
