= Claude Patry =

Canadian politician

Member of Parliament for Jonquière—Alma
- In office May 2, 2011 – August 4, 2015
- Preceded by: Jean-Pierre Blackburn
- Succeeded by: Karine Trudel

Personal details
- Born: January 10, 1953 (age 73) Arvida, Quebec
- Party: Bloc Québécois (2013-2015); New Democrat (2011-2013)
- Spouse: Francine Latilippe
- Profession: Union representative

Claude Patry (born January 10, 1953) is a former Canadian Member of Parliament for the riding of Jonquière—Alma, who served a single term from 2011 Canadian federal election until 2015. He was elected as a member of the New Democratic Party, but crossed over to the Bloc Québécois on February 28, 2013. He defeated incumbent MP Jean-Pierre Blackburn of the Conservative Party, who was Veterans Affairs Minister.

Patry was president of the Syndicat national des employés de l'aluminium d'Arvida, the union representing Rio Tinto Alcan workers in the riding.

Following his defection to the Bloc in 2013, Patry stated that "he voted for sovereignty in the 1980 and 1995 referendums and that he still hopes Quebec will one day become a country".

In August 2014, Patry announced that he was not running in the next federal election. He was rumoured to have considered resigning from the Bloc following the election of Mario Beaulieu as leader but remained with the party following the resignations of André Bellavance and Jean-François Fortin and was, with Louis Plamondon, one of two Bloc MPs until the House of Commons dissolved for the 2015 election.

It was reported in February 2017 that Patry had joined the militant far-right anti-Muslim group, La Meute (Wolf Pack) and is leader of the group's "clan" in the Saguenay–Lac-Saint-Jean region.

== Electoral record ==
2011 Canadian federal election
Party	Candidate	Votes	%	±%	Expenditures
New Democratic	Claude Patry	22,900	43.4%	-	
Conservative	Jean-Pierre Blackburn	18,569	35.2%	-	
Bloc Québécois	Pierre Forest	9,554	18.1%	-	
Liberal	Claude Ringuette	1,043	2.0%	-	
Green	France Bergeron	652	1.2%	-	
Total valid votes/Expense limit		52,718	100.0%		

Source: Elections Canada
