= Jules Gauthier =

Canadian politician

Mayor of Jonquière, Quebec
- In office 1942–1942

Member of Parliament for Lapointe
- In office June 1949 – June 1953
- Preceded by: riding created
- Succeeded by: Fernand Girard

Personal details
- Born: 26 September 1892 Unknown
- Died: 15 December 1975 (aged 83) Quebec, Canada
- Party: Liberal
- Spouse(s): Lea Chouinard m. 27 September 1922
- Profession: notary

Jules Gauthier (26 September 1892 – 15 December 1975) was a Liberal party member of the House of Commons of Canada. He became a notary by career.

Gauthier was educated at the Chicoutimi Seminary and at Université Laval where he received his degree in civil law (LLL). In 1942, he was mayor of Jonquière.

He was first elected to Parliament at the Lapointe riding in the 1949 general election. After serving one term, the 21st Canadian Parliament, Gauthier left the House of Commons, and did not seek another term in the 1953 election.
