= Sainte-Jeanne-d'Arc, Quebec =

Sainte-Jeanne-d'Arc
- Village municipality
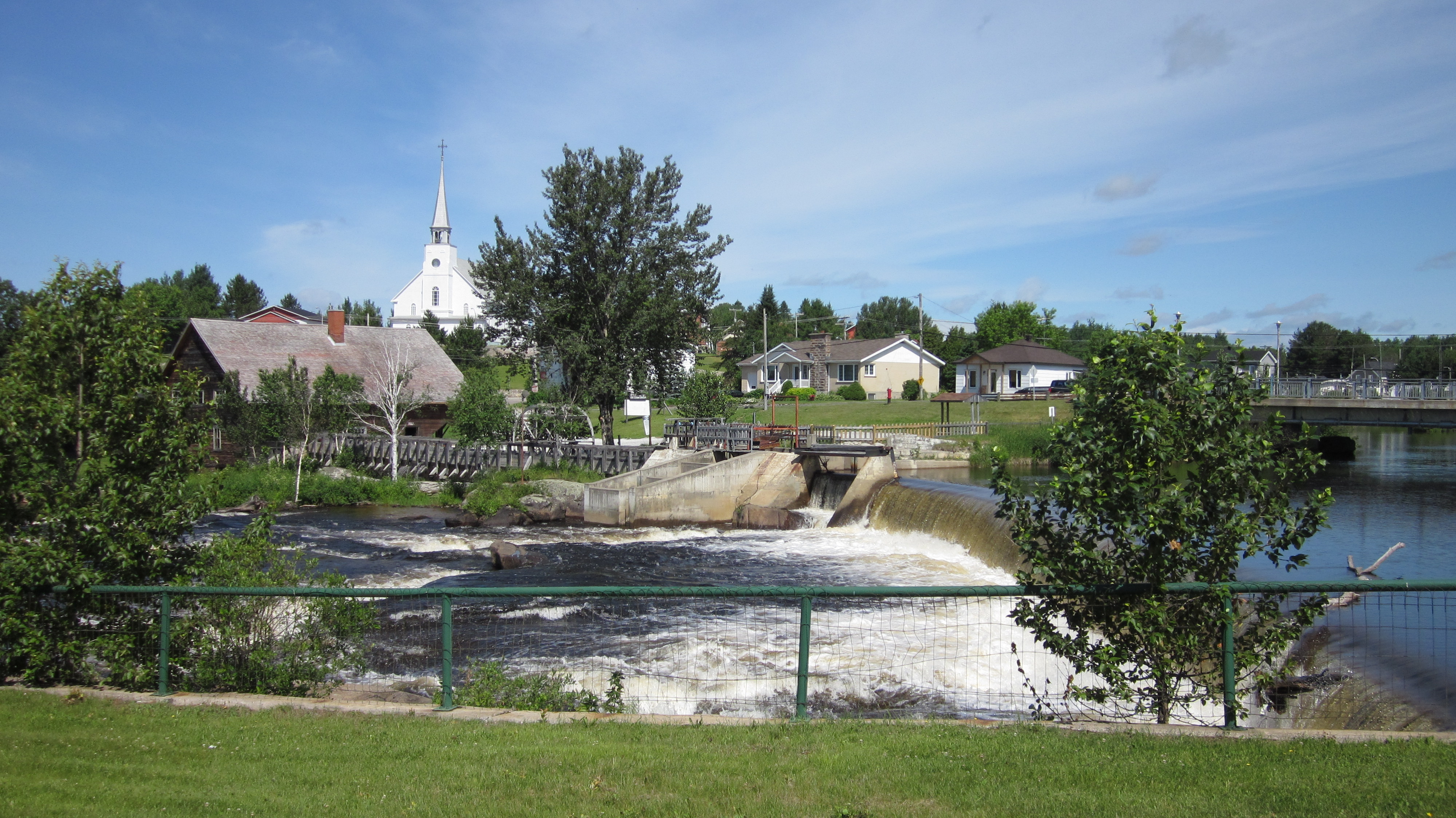
- Sainte-Jeanne-d'Arc seen from the river

- Location in Saguenay–Lac-Saint-Jean Quebec
- Coordinates: 48.8575°N 72.0939°W
- Country: Canada
- Province: Quebec
- Region: Saguenay–Lac-Saint-Jean
- RCM: Maria-Chapdelaine
- Constituted: January 24, 1970
- Named for: Joan of Arc

Government
  - Mayor: Denise Lamontagne
  - Federal riding: Jonquière
  - Prov. riding: Roberval

Area
  - Total: 273.30 km^{2} (105.52 sq mi)
  - Land: 267.28 km^{2} (103.20 sq mi)

Population (2021)
  - Total: 1,101
  - Density: 4.1/km^{2} (11/sq mi)
  - Pop (2016–21): ▲4.9%
  - Dwellings: 552
- Time zone: UTC−5 (EST)
  - Summer (DST): UTC−4 (EDT)
- Postal code(s): G0W 1E0
- Area codes: 418 and 581

Sainte-Jeanne-d'Arc (French pronunciation: [sɛ̃t ʒan daʁk]; French for Saint Joan of Arc) is a village in the Canadian province of Quebec, located within the regional county municipality of Maria-Chapdelaine. The village had a population of 1,101 in the Canada 2021 Census.

== Demographics ==
In the 2021 Census of Population conducted by Statistics Canada, Sainte-Jeanne-d'Arc had a population of 1,101 living in 493 of its 552 total private dwellings, a change of 4.9% from its 2016 population of 1,050. With a land area of 267.28 km^{2} (103.20 sq mi), it had a population density of 4.1/km^{2} (10.7/sq mi) in 2021.

Population trend:

- Population in 2021: 1,101 (2016 to 2021 population change: 4.9%)
- Population in 2016: 1,050
- Population in 2011: 1,089
- Population in 2006: 1,139
- Population in 2001: 1,128
- Population in 1996: 1,158
- Population in 1991: 1,113
- Population in 1986: 1,072
- Population in 1981: 1,047
- Population in 1976: 953
- Population in 1971: 936
- Population in 1966: 678
- Population in 1961: 909
- Population in 1956: 946
- Population in 1951: 1,024

Mother tongue:

- English as first language: 0.9%
- French as first language: 98.6%
- English and French as first language: 0.5%
- Other as first language: 0%
