= Vân Hồ district =

Vân Hồ district Huyện Vân Hồ
- District
- Interactive map of Vân Hồ district
- Coordinates: 20°47′48″N 104°46′23″E
- Country: Vietnam
- Region: Northwest
- Province: Sơn La
- Established: 2013
- Capital: Vân Hồ

Area
  - Total: 378.32 sq mi (979.84 km^{2})

Population (2013)
  - Total: 55,797
  - Density: 150/sq mi (57/km^{2})
- Time zone: UTC+7 (UTC + 7)

Vân Hồ is a former rural district of Sơn La province in the Northwest region of Vietnam. As of 2003 the district had a population of 55,797. The district covers an area of 979.84 km^{2}. The district capital lies at Vân Hồ.
