= Alfred Kornprobst =

German weightlifter (1940–1991)

Personal information
- Nationality: German
- Born: 28 July 1940; Nuremberg, Germany
- Died: 7 June 1991 (aged 50)

Sport
- Sport: Weightlifting

Alfred Kornprobst (28 July 1940 – 7 June 1991) was a German weightlifter. He competed in the men's lightweight event at the 1964 Summer Olympics.
