= Kalmen Kaplansky =

Canadian civil, human rights, and trade union activist

Kalmen Kaplansky, (born Kalman Kaplański) CM (January 5, 1912 – December 10, 1997) was a civil, human rights and trade union activist in Canada. Alan Borovoy described Kaplansky as "the zaideh" (grandfather) of the Canadian human rights movement.

Kaplansky was born in Białystok in what is now Poland to a Polish-Jewish family and emigrated to Montreal after graduating from high school in 1929. He attempted to enroll at McGill University but the university's registrar told the young Jewish immigrant that "my job is to keep people like you out of the university."

He was a printer by profession and worked as a linotype operator and typesetter from 1932 to 1943. He was an active member of the Montreal Typographical Union (Local 176 of the International Typographical Union) serving on its executive and as the local union's delegate to the Montreal Trades and Labour Council and to the Trades and Labour Congress of Canada.

From 1936 to 1938 he was the secretary of the Montreal council of the Labour Party of Canada. He was also a leading activist in the Jewish community serving as chairman of the Workmen's Circle in Montreal from 1940 to 1943. He served with the Canadian Army from 1943 to 1946.

In August 1939, as World War II loomed, Kaplansky returned to Białystok in an unsuccessful attempt to persuade his father and brothers to come to Canada. He boarded SS Athenia to cross the Atlantic on his return trip in September 1939 and was one of the survivors when it became the first British ship to be sunk by the Germans after Britain declared war.

== Human rights activism ==
As the national director of the Jewish Labour Committee from 1946 to 1957, Kaplansky was a leading advocate for anti-discrimination efforts; he believed that it was necessary to extend the JLC's mandate beyond fighting anti-Semitism to combat discrimination against all minorities and involve non-Jews, and the broader labour movement, in the JLC's civil rights work.

Kaplansky persuaded the Canadian division of the United Steel Workers of America to introduce a resolution at the 1947 Canadian Congress of Labour convention calling for "vigorous action" on the part of the CCL and its affiliated unions in "the fight for full equality for all peoples, regardless of race, colour, creed, or national origin." Kaplansky also lobbied for the creation of a permanent committee on racial tolerance which the CCL established in 1948.

He also worked along the same lines with the CCL's rival, the Trades and Labour Congress of Canada working with Claude Jodoin to write the Congress' Racial Discrimination Committee report in 1946 which called for the TLCC to take action against racial and religious intolerance calling them "dangerous ideas ... being used by our enemies to divide labor and to distract the attention of the working people of this country from the real issues facing them." Kaplansky also wrote a resolution to the TLC convention, introduced by the International Ladies Garment Workers Union which called for the establishment of "trade unions committees for racial tolerance."

Kaplansky and the JLC were thus able to organize Joint Labour Committees to Combat Racial Intolerance with the CCL and the TLC in Montreal, Toronto, Windsor, Winnipeg and Vancouver that fought against discrimination against minorities including Jews, Black Canadians, French Canadians and Roman Catholics and actively investigated and exposed complaints of discriminatory practices. These efforts are credited with bringing about laws against discriminatory hiring and accommodation practices in Ontario and elsewhere.

His work helped bring about the Ontario Fair Employment Practices Act of 1951 that banned racial discrimination in hiring and influenced legislation across the country.

Kaplansky was also chair of National Committee on Human Rights of the Canadian Labour Congress, with the mandate being the "elimination of racial and religious discrimination in all areas of Canadian society and the promotion of equality of opportunity in employment, housing, and public accommodation for all residents of Canada." and was the first director of the Department of International Affairs of the Canadian Labour Congress. He also served as Canadian labour's representative of the International Labour Organization where he helped draft the ILO's Discrimination (Employment and Occupation) Convention, 1958 which is the world standard for judging nations' laws and practices on the issue and is credited with earning the ILO the Nobel Peace Prize in 1969. He was also an alternate member on Canada's delegation to UNESCO.

In 1947, Kaplansky and Morris Lewis spearheaded "The Tailors Project" by the Workmen's Circle and Jewish Labour Committee to bring European Jewish refugees to Montreal to work in the needle trades They were able to do this through the federal government's "bulk-labour" program that allowed labour-intensive industries to bring European displaced persons to Canada, in order to fill those jobs.

== Electoral politics ==
Politically, Kaplansky was active with the Co-operative Commonwealth Federation (CCF) and, its successor, the New Democratic Party. While serving in the army he was an unsuccessful Quebec CCF candidate in the 1944 Quebec provincial election. He later ran in a 1950 federal by-election in Cartier.

== Later life ==
In his final years he was president of the Douglas-Coldwell Foundation, which promotes education and research into social democracy. Kaplansky died on International Human Rights Day in 1997.

== Honours ==
In 1980, Kaplansky was awarded the Order of Canada for his human rights efforts.
