= Mya Thein =

Burmese weightlifter

Personal information
- Nationality: Burmese
- Born: 10 March 1936 (age 89)

Sport
- Sport: Weightlifting

Mya Thein (born 10 March 1936) is a Burmese weightlifter. He competed in the men's lightweight event at the 1964 Summer Olympics.
