= André Caron =

Canadian politician

Member of Parliament for Jonquière
- In office January 1994 – January 1997
- Preceded by: Jean-Pierre Blackburn
- Succeeded by: Jocelyne Girard-Bujold

Personal details
- Born: 18 December 1944 Jonquière, Quebec, Canada
- Died: 10 January 1997 (aged 52) Chicoutimi, Quebec, Canada
- Party: Bloc Québécois
- Spouse: Marie Lévesque
- Profession: guidance counsellor

André Caron (18 December 1944 – 10 January 1997) was a member of the House of Commons of Canada from 1993 to 1997. He was a school guidance counsellor in the Jonquière area and became a church deacon in 1988.

Caron was born in Jonquière, Quebec, where he was elected for the Bloc Québécois party in the 1993 federal election. He served in the 35th Canadian Parliament for the Jonquière electoral district as the Bloc's transportation critic.

His education included Université Laval and Université du Québec à Chicoutimi. He studied counselling and teaching subjects at the former institution, and theology at the latter.

Caron died in hospital at Chicoutimi, Quebec of cancer before completing his first term in office, several months before the next federal election. He left two sons (Jean-François, Louis-Philippe) and wife Marie Lévesque.
