= Stan Hawkins =

British water polo player

Stanley Hawkins
Personal information
- Nationality: British
- Born: 24 November 1924
- Died: 11 July 2004 (aged 79) Surrey, England

Sport
- Sport: Water polo

Stanley Hawkins (24 November 1924 – 11 July 2004) was a British water polo player. He competed in the men's tournament at the 1952 Summer Olympics.
