= Jean-Pierre Blackburn =

Canadian politician (born 1948)

The Honourable Jean-Pierre Blackburn PC
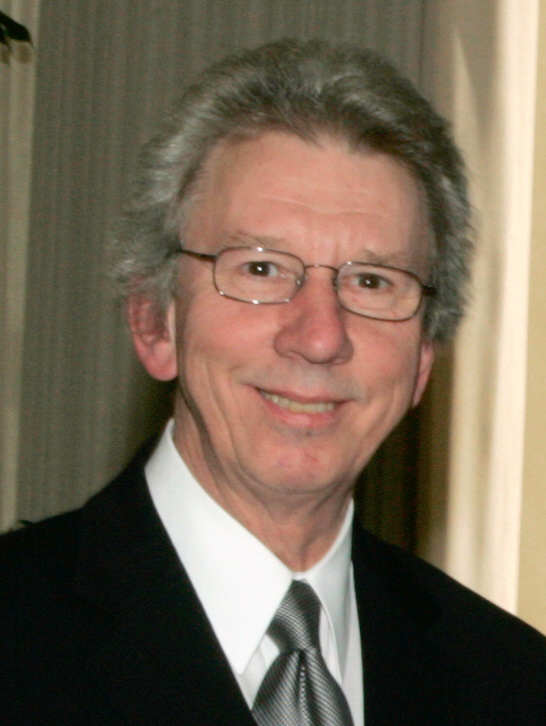
- Jean-Pierre Blackburn in 2007

Member of Parliament for Jonquière—Alma
- In office 2006–2011
- Preceded by: Sébastien Gagnon
- Succeeded by: Claude Patry

Member of Parliament for Jonquière
- In office 1984–1993
- Preceded by: Gilles Marceau
- Succeeded by: André Caron

Personal details
- Born: July 6, 1948 (age 77) Jonquière, Quebec, Canada
- Party: Conservative; Progressive Conservative
- Spouse: Ginette Laforest
- Profession: Administrator, manager, professor
- Cabinet: Minister of Veterans Affairs; Minister of State (Agriculture)

Jean-Pierre Blackburn, PC (born July 6, 1948) is a Canadian politician and diplomat. He was the Conservative Member of Parliament (MP) for the riding of Jonquière—Alma from 2006 to 2011; earlier, he was the Progressive Conservative MP for Jonquière from 1984 to 1993.

Blackburn was born in Jonquière, Quebec. In 1993, Blackburn was the Parliamentary Secretary to the Minister of National Defence. On February 6, 2006, he was appointed Minister of Labour and Housing in Prime Minister Stephen Harper's Cabinet. He was shuffled to the National Revenue portfolio on October 30, 2008, and became Minister of Veterans Affairs in 2010. In the May 2011 federal election, Blackburn lost to the NDP candidate, Claude Patry.

A businessman, Blackburn holds a bachelor's degree in administration and a master's in regional studies and intervention from the Université du Québec à Chicoutimi. He has also been a manager, administrator and a professor. More recently, he has been the president of Blackburn Communications Inc.

He was named Canada's Ambassador and Permanent Delegate to UNESCO in December 2011.

In May 2017, Jean-Pierre Blackburn became leader of the Citizens' Party of Saguenay in order to be a candidate for Mayor's office in the November municipal election.

28th Canadian Ministry (2006–2015) – Cabinet of Stephen Harper
Cabinet posts (5)
Predecessor	Office	Successor
Greg Thompson	Minister of Veterans Affairs; 2010–2011	Steven Blaney
Gordon O'Connor	Minister of National Revenue; 2008–2010	Keith Ashfield
Christian Paradis as Secretary of State (Agriculture)	Minister of State (Agriculture); 2008–2011	none
Joe Fontana	Minister of Labour; 2006–2008	Rona Ambrose
Jacques Saada	Minister of the Economic Development Agency of Canada for the Regions of Quebec; 2006–2008	Denis Lebel as Minister of State (Economic Development Agency of Canada for the Regions of Quebec)
