= Fernand Girard =

Canadian politician

Member of Parliament for Lapointe
- In office August 1953 – June 1957
- Preceded by: Jules Gauthier
- Succeeded by: Augustin Brassard

Personal details
- Born: 19 February 1924 Saint-Cyriac, Quebec
- Died: 2 July 2004 (aged 80) Québec, Quebec
- Party: Independent
- Spouse(s): Rose Ange Plourde (m. 1 July 1949 - ?); Annette Labelle (m. unknown)
- Children: Rémy Girard
- Profession: journalist

Fernand Girard (19 February 1924 – 2 July 2004) was an Independent member of the House of Commons of Canada. He was born in Saint-Cyriac, Quebec and became a journalist, including editor of Le Réveil de Jonquière.

He was first elected to Parliament at the Lapointe riding in the 1953 general election. After serving his only term, the 22nd Canadian Parliament, Girard was defeated by Augustin Brassard of the Liberal party.

After this, Girard moved to provincial politics where he became general secretary and cabinet chief of Quebec's Union Nationale party, serving under Premier Daniel Johnson, Sr. After his retirement, he became vice-president of Société québécoise d’initiative pétrolière (SOQUIP).

In 1954, with Gaston D'Auteuil, Girard wrote the book Artisans d'un beau Royaume, a historic review of the Sageunay-Lac-Saint-Jean area.

Girard died at Jonquière on 2 July 2004, aged 80.

His son Rémy Girard is a noted Canadian actor.
