= Sơn Động, Bắc Ninh =

Coordinates: 21°20′N 106°51′E

Sơn Động
- Commune
- Interactive map of Sơn Động
- Country: Vietnam
- City: Bắc Ninh
- Established date: 11 December 1991

Area
  - Total: 7.81 sq mi (20.22 km^{2})

Population (2019)
  - Total: 9,416
  - Density: 1,210/sq mi (466/km^{2})
- Time zone: UTC+07:00
- Postal code: 07615
- Climate: Cwa

Sơn Động is a commune (xã) and town of Bắc Ninh, in north-eastern Vietnam.
