= Yoko Watanabe =

Japanese opera soprano (1953–2004)

- 渡辺 葉子
- Born: 12 July 1953; Kitakyushu, Japan
- Died: 15 July 2004 (aged 51); Milan, Italy
- Occupation: Operatic soprano
- Spouse: Renato Grimaldi

Yoko Watanabe (渡辺 葉子, Watanabe Yōko; June 12, 1953 – July 15, 2004) was a Japanese operatic soprano who spent much of her career singing the title role of Madama Butterfly.

== Biography ==
Yoko was born in the Kitakyushu city, Fukuoka Prefecture, where her father practiced medicine. She first studied piano and then studied vocals when she reached high school age. Following her high school graduation, she studied at the Tokyo University of the Arts. After she graduated in 1976, she left for Italy, studying at the Teatro alla Scala Academy of Lyric Opera. She made her stage debut in the role of Nedda in Pagliacci in 1983, after which she sang in Italy.

She was also known for her large repertoire, including such works as Micaela in Carmen, Donna Elvira in Don Giovanni, Marguerite in Faust and Amelia in Verdi's Simon Boccanegra. She returned to Japan in 1985 for her much-celebrated first performance at home with the Fujiwara Opera troupe as the title role in Puccini's Madama Butterfly, her signature role.

Watanabe died from cancer in her Milan home on 15 July 2004 at the age of 51.
