= Quang Minh =

Commune in Hanoi, Vietnam

- Commune
- Mê Linh Plaza shopping center
- Interactive map of Quang Minh
- Coordinates: 21.182775727352453°N 105.72077884794687°E
- Country: Vietnam
- Region: Red River Delta
- Municipality: Hanoi
- Administrative headquarters: Nội Đồng Hamlet

Area
  - Total: 32.17 km^{2} (12.42 sq mi)

Population (2025)
  - Total: 69,623
  - Density: 2,164/km^{2} (5,600/sq mi)
- Website: quangminh.hanoi.gov.vn

Quang Minh is a commune in the municipality of Hanoi, Vietnam.

On 16 June 2025, district-level administrative units nationwide ceased to operate.

On the same date, the Standing Committee of the National Assembly of Vietnam issued Resolution No. 1656/NQ-UBTVQH15 on the arrangement of commune-level administrative units in Hanoi in 2025. Under the resolution, the entire area and population of Chi Đông Township and Quang Minh Township, the remaining areas of Mê Linh, Tiền Phong, Đại Thịnh, and Kim Hoa communes, and the entire area and population of Thanh Lâm Commune, all formerly part of Mê Linh district, were merged to form a new commune named Quang Minh.
