= Niras Haroon =

Thai weightlifter (born 1942)

Personal information
- Nationality: Thai
- Born: 27 January 1942 (age 83)

Sport
- Sport: Weightlifting

Niras Haroon (born 27 January 1942) is a Thai weightlifter. He competed in the men's lightweight event at the 1964 Summer Olympics.
