= Sébastien Gagnon =

Canadian politician, businessman, and soldier

Sébastien Gagnon (born May 21, 1973) is a Canadian businessman and former politician and soldier. Gagnon was elected as a Bloc Québécois member of the House of Commons of Canada in a 2002 by-election. He was elected in the riding of Lac-Saint-Jean—Saguenay and was re-elected in the 2004 Canadian federal election in the riding of Jonquière—Alma. Gagnon is the former Bloc critic of Regional Development, and is a former critic of Children and Youth. He was defeated in the 2006 federal election.

Gagnon was born in Metabetchouan, Quebec. Before entering politics, he was an entrepreneur and executive manager. Gagnon served in the Canadian Army from 1991 to 1995.

Parliament of Canada
Preceded by Stéphan Tremblay, Bloc Québécois	Member of Parliament for Lac-Saint-Jean—Saguenay; 2002-2004	Succeeded by The electoral district was abolished in 2003
Preceded by The electoral district was established in 2003.	Member of Parliament for Jonquière—Alma; 2004-2006	Succeeded by Jean-Pierre Blackburn, Conservative
