= Boo Kim Siang =

Malaysian weightlifter (born 1938)

Personal information
- Nationality: Malaysian
- Born: 21 January 1938 (age 88)

Sport
- Sport: Weightlifting

Boo Kim Siang (born 21 January 1938) is a Malaysian weightlifter. He competed in the men's lightweight event at the 1964 Summer Olympics.
