= Roger Colliot =

French footballer (1925–2004)

Personal information
- Date of birth: 2 September 1925
- Place of birth: Noyelles-Godault, France
- Date of death: 27 July 2004 (aged 78)
- Position: Defender

Senior career*
Years	Team	Apps	(Gls)
1951–1960	CO Roubaix-Tourcoing		
- * Club domestic league appearances and goals

Roger Colliot (French: [ʁɔʒe kɔljo]; 2 September 1925 – 27 July 2004) was a French football defender who was a member of the French squad at the 1952 Summer Olympics.
