= Bégin, Quebec =

Bégin
- Municipality
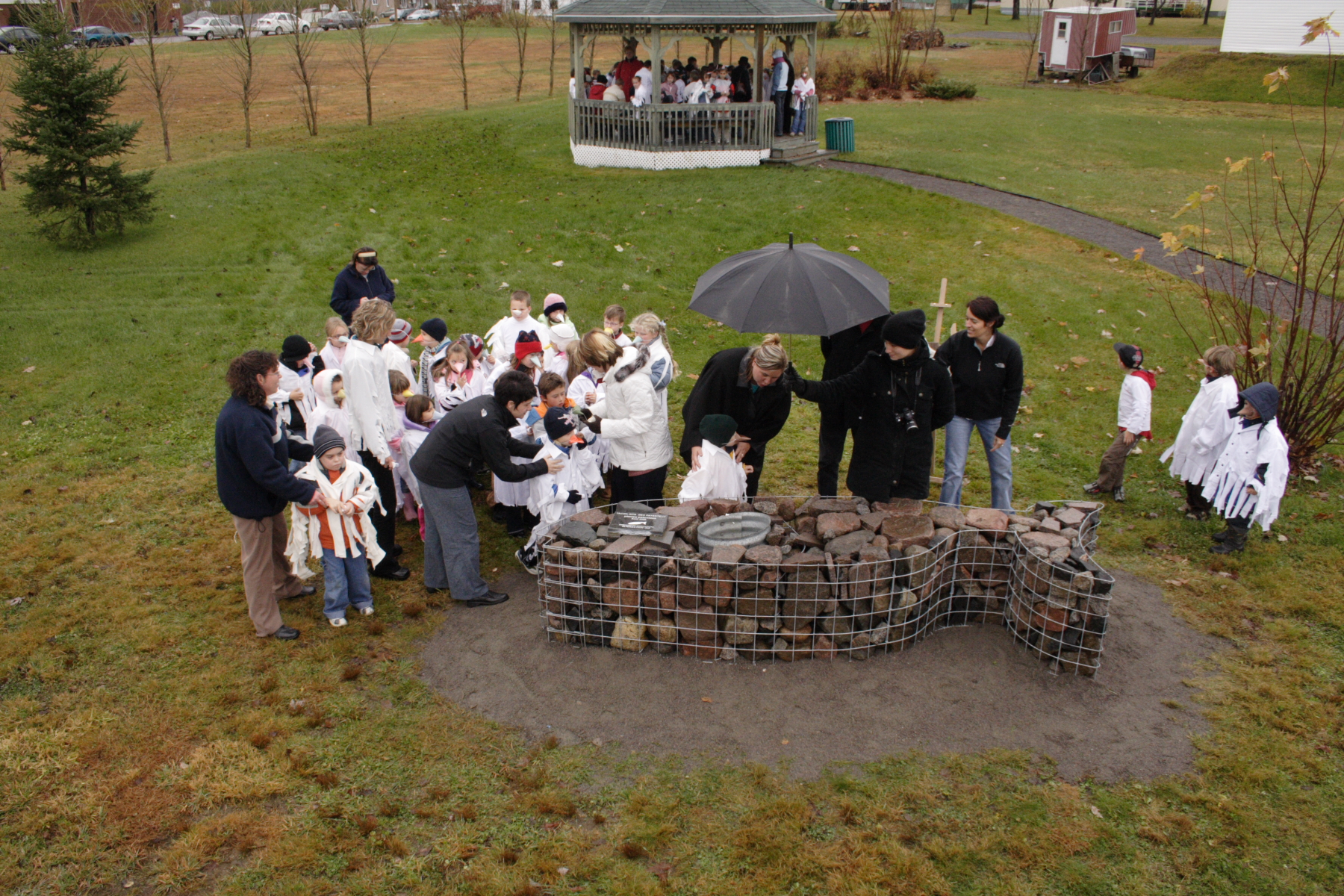

- Location in Saguenay–Lac-Saint-Jean Quebec.
- Coordinates: 48°40′N 71°20′W
- Country: Canada
- Province: Quebec
- Region: Saguenay–Lac-Saint-Jean
- RCM: Le Fjord-du-Saguenay
- Settled: 1910s
- Constituted: February 8, 1922

Government
  - Mayor: Gérald Savard
  - Federal riding: Jonquière—Hébertville—Pays-des-Bleuets
  - Prov. riding: Dubuc

Area
  - Total: 195.60 km^{2} (75.52 sq mi)
  - Land: 189.67 km^{2} (73.23 sq mi)

Population (2021)
  - Total: 851
  - Density: 4.5/km^{2} (12/sq mi)
  - Pop 2016-2021: ▲4.0%
  - Dwellings: 491
- Time zone: UTC−5 (EST)
  - Summer (DST): UTC−4 (EDT)
- Postal code(s): G0V 1B0
- Area codes: 418 and 581
- Highways: No major routes
- Climate: Dfb
- Website: www.begin.ca

Bégin is a municipality in Quebec, Canada. It is named after Louis-Nazaire Bégin, and was first settled by families from Tadoussac around 1915.

== See also ==
- List of municipalities in Quebec
