= Zdeněk Otáhal =

Czech weightlifter

Personal information
- Nationality: Czech
- Born: 31 January 1936; Benešov, Czechoslovakia
- Died: 1 July 2004 (aged 68); Plzeň, Czech Republic

Sport
- Sport: Weightlifting

Zdeněk Otáhal (31 January 1936 – 1 July 2004) was a Czech weightlifter. He competed at the 1960 Summer Olympics and the 1964 Summer Olympics.
