= Saint-Ambroise, Quebec =

Saint-Ambroise
- Municipality
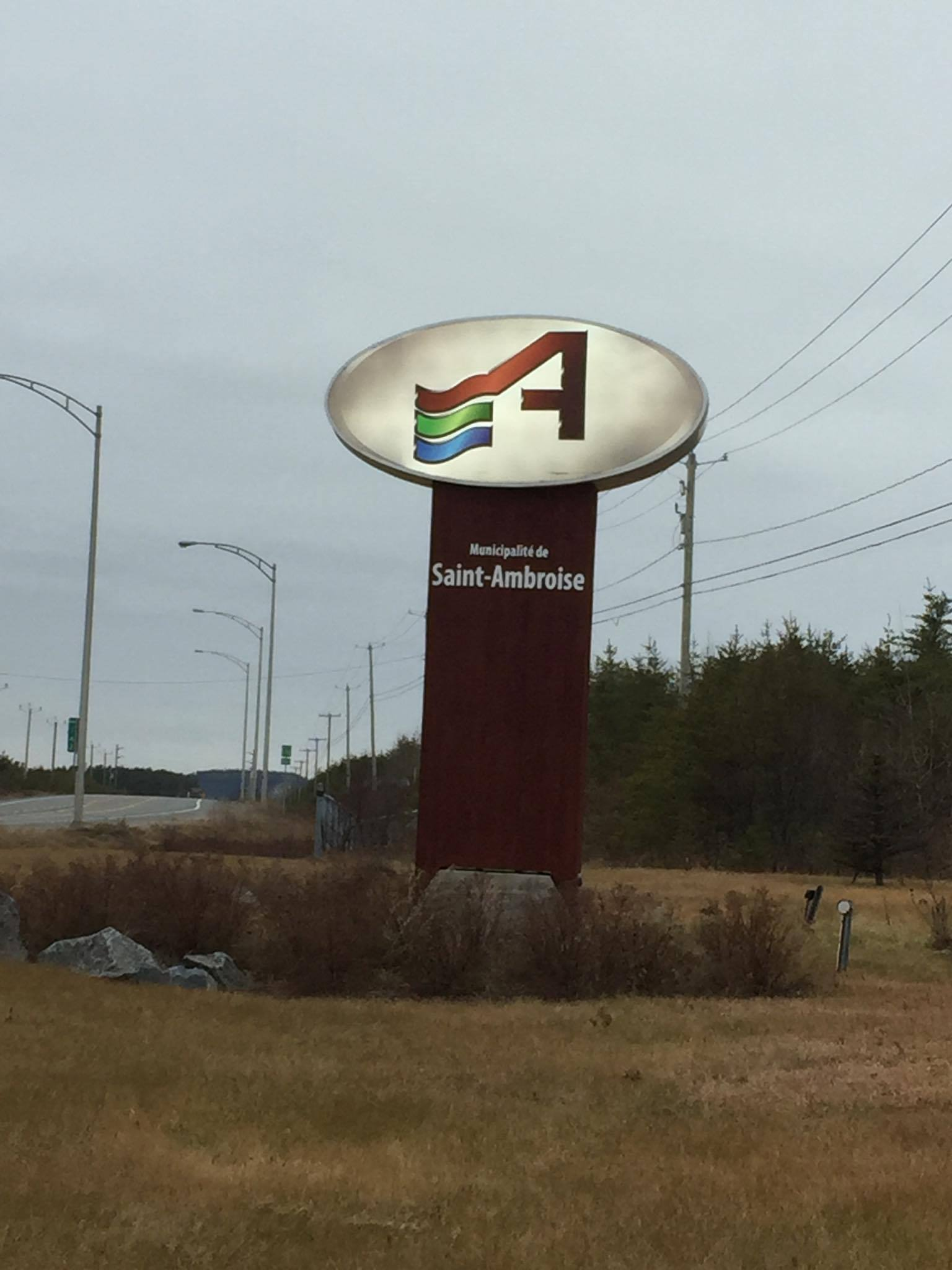
- Entrance sign of Saint-Ambroise

- Location in Saguenay–Lac-Saint-Jean Quebec
- Coordinates: 48°33′N 71°20′W
- Country: Canada
- Province: Quebec
- Region: Saguenay–Lac-Saint-Jean
- RCM: Le Fjord-du-Saguenay
- Settled: 1869
- Constituted: September 25, 1971

Government
  - Mayor: Lucien Gravel
  - Federal riding: Jonquière—Hébertville—Pays-des-Bleuets
  - Prov. riding: Dubuc

Area
  - Total: 150.20 km^{2} (57.99 sq mi)
  - Land: 149.37 km^{2} (57.67 sq mi)

Population (2021)
  - Total: 3,883
  - Density: 26/km^{2} (67/sq mi)
  - Pop (2016–21): ▲2.7%
  - Dwellings: 1,833
- Time zone: UTC−5 (EST)
  - Summer (DST): UTC−4 (EDT)
- Postal code(s): G7P 2P9
- Area codes: 418 and 581
- Website: www.st-ambroise.qc.ca

Saint-Ambroise (French pronunciation: [sɛ̃t‿ɑ̃bʁwaz]) is a municipality in Le Fjord-du-Saguenay Regional County Municipality, in the region of Saguenay-Lac-Saint-Jean, Quebec, Canada.
