= Vân Sơn, Bắc Ninh =

Coordinates: 21°19′N 106°20′E

Vân Sơn
- Commune and village
- Interactive map of Vân Sơn
- Country: Vietnam
- City: Bắc Ninh
- Time zone: UTC+07:00

Vân Sơn is a commune (xã) in Bắc Ninh, in northeastern Vietnam.
