= Vân Hồ =

Vân Hồ Xã Vân Hồ
- Rural commune
- Vân Hồ commune
- Location within Vietnam
- Coordinates: 20°47′48″N 104°46′23″E
- Country: Vietnam
- Region: Northwest
- Province: Sơn La

Area
  - Total: 29.50 sq mi (76.41 km^{2})

Population (2020)
  - Total: 10,241
  - Density: 347.1/sq mi (134.0/km^{2})
- Time zone: UTC+7 (UTC + 7)
- Administrative code: 04048

Vân Hồ is a rural commune (xã) of Sơn La Province, Vietnam.

Vân Hồ has an area of 76.41 km², a population of 10,241 people in 2020, and a population density of 134 people/km².
