= 1965 SEAP Games =

Multi-sport event in Kuala Lumpur, Malaysia

3rd Southeast Asian Peninsular Games
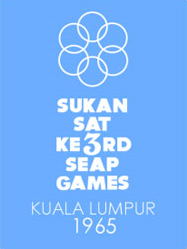
- Host city: Kuala Lumpur, Malaysia
- Nations: 7
- Sport: 14
- Opening: 14 December 1965
- Closing: 21 December 1965
- Opened by: Ismail Nasiruddin of Terengganu; Yang di-Pertuan Agong
- Athlete's Oath: Mudlifah Yusoff
- Torch lighter: Rahim Ahmad
- Main venue: Stadium Merdeka

The 1965 Southeast Asian Peninsular Games, officially known as the 3rd Southeast Asian Peninsular Games, were a Southeast Asian multi-sport event held in Kuala Lumpur, Malaysia, from 14 to 21 December 1965 with 14 sports featured in the games. Originally to be hosted by Laos, the third edition of the games was hosted by Malaysia after the former was not able to honour its hosting commitment citing financial difficulties and would later known to have hosted the 2009 SEA Games decades later. Two years earlier, the third SEAP Games was cancelled as Cambodia pulled out of hosting the event due to internal strife. This was the first time Malaysia host the games. Malaysia is the third country to host the Southeast Asian Peninsular Games, which later known as the Southeast Asian Games after Thailand and Myanmar, then Burma. The games was opened and closed by Ismail Nasiruddin, the King of Malaysia at the Stadium Merdeka. The final medal tally was led by Thailand followed by host Malaysia and Singapore.

== The games ==
=== Participating nations ===
- Burma (135)
- Cambodia (40)
- Laos (20)
- Malaysia (host) (189)
- Singapore (114)
- South Vietnam (121)
- Thailand (186)

=== Sports ===
- Aquatics
- Athletics
- Badminton
- Basketball
- Boxing
- Cycling
- Football
- Judo
- Shooting
- Sepak takraw
- Table tennis
- Tennis
- Volleyball
- Weightlifting

=== Medal table ===
Key

* Host nation (Malaysia)

| Rank | Nation | Gold | Silver | Bronze | Total |
|---|---|---|---|---|---|
| 1 | Thailand (THA) | 38 | 33 | 35 | 106 |
| 2 | Malaysia (MAS)* | 33 | 36 | 29 | 98 |
| 3 | Singapore (SIN) | 26 | 23 | 27 | 76 |
| 4 | Burma (BIR) | 18 | 14 | 16 | 48 |
| 5 | Cambodia (CAM) | 15 | 19 | 17 | 51 |
| 6 | South Vietnam (VNM) | 5 | 7 | 7 | 19 |
| 7 | Laos (LAO) | 0 | 0 | 2 | 2 |
| Totals (7 entries) | | 135 | 132 | 133 | 400 |

| Preceded by Rangoon | Southeast Asian Peninsular Games; Kuala Lumpur; III Southeast Asian Peninsular Games (1965) | Succeeded by Bangkok |
