= Laha =

Laha may refer to:

- Laha people, an ethnic group in Vietnam
- Laha language, a Kra language of Vietnam
- Laha language (Indonesia), a language spoken on Ambon Island

== Places ==
- Laha, Seram, Indonesia
- Laha, Heilongjiang, a town in Nehe City, Heilongjiang, China
- Laha airfield near Laha Village, on Ambon Island, Indonesia

== Name ==
An Indian surname. People named Laha are

- Radha Laha (1930-1999) Indian scientist
- Prabuddha Laha (1950-2004) Indian politician

An Atayal given name. People named Laha are

- Laha Mebow (1975-) Taiwanese Atayal film director

== See also ==
- Kafr Laha (Arabic: كفرلاها), a town north of Homs, Syria
- Lahas, commune in the Gers department, France
- Ake Laha or Akelaha, village on Halmahera Island, Indonesia
- Entomobrya laha, animal, a member of the order Entognatha
