= Tân Uyên =

Tân Uyên may refer to several places in Vietnam, including:

- Tân Uyên, Bình Dương, a district-level town of Bình Dương province
- Tân Uyên, Ho Chi Minh City, ward of Ho Chi Minh City
- Tân Uyên district, a rural district of Lai Châu province
