= Tai Phake people =

Tai-speaking indigenous group in Assam

Tai Phake
Total population
- 8000 (approx.)

Regions with significant populations
- India

Languages
- Tai Phake, Assamese

Religion
- Theravada Buddhism

Related ethnic groups
- Other Tai peoples; (Thai people, Lao people, Shan people, Dai people, Tai Nua)

Tai Phake, also known as Phakial or simply Phake, belong to the Tai-speaking indigenous ethnic group living in Dibrugarh district and Tinsukia district of Assam, principally along the areas of Dihing river as well as adjacent parts of Lohit and Changlang district in Arunachal Pradesh. As of 1990, their population stood at 5,000, which consists of less than 250 families.

== History ==
The territory of Mong Mao in the heyday of the Si Kefa (1360)

The Tai Phake people are believed to have originated from the Shan kingdom of Möng Mao. The word Phake has been derived from the Tai words "Pha" meaning wall and "Ke" meaning ancient or old.

Before migrating to Assam in 1775, they ruled a small polity in the Hukawng valley known as Phake or Möng Phake. Coming to Assam, they at first settled under their chief Chow Ta Meng Khuen Meng of the royal line of Mung Kong at a place called Moongkongtat, a little above Ningroo on the Buridihing.

In the early 19th century the Tai Phake people were called upon by the then Ahom officer Chandra Gohain who visited the eastern districts where Phake were originally settled accompanied a small army. Chandra Gohain brought them from their original habitat to his capital. When the British invaded Assam, they and others of the Shan race were ordered by the Burmese authorities to return to Mogoung. The Tai Phake people went up to Buridihing and settled there. On their way back, they settled in many of the rich south banks of the Buridihing River.

== Villages ==
A significant population of Tai Phake people is found in both Assam and Arunachal Pradesh. Some of the villages are namely: Namphake, Tipamphake, Borphake, Manmau, Namsai, Manlong, Nanglai, Ninggum, Phaneng, Lalung, etc.

== Economy ==
The main occupation of the Tai Phake people is agriculture. They cultivate crops such as rice paddy, mustard, potatoes. Besides agriculture, they also have other subsidiary sources of income from which the people earn a good income. They also rear cattle, buffaloes. Fishing is a major practice of the Tai Phakes.

== Society ==
=== Administrative structure ===
The Tai Phakes are essentially democratic and simple. Although the people do not possess any formal council, yet the meeting of the village elders headed by the "Chow mann"(Village chief) exercises the highest legal and judicial powers. Any dispute among the people is settled by the village meeting headed by the village chief. The Tai Phakes possess a written code called "thamchat", which is referred to by the village elders while deciding of local nature. The penalties for breaches of law, the idea of right and wrong, appear to be genuinely indigenous to their culture. The rules of conduct that the "thamchat" enjoins on its members are mainly based on ethical principles.

=== Marriage ===
The Tai Phakes usually marry within the community. They are monogamous although polygamy is not forbidden provided the man has the requisite means to support such a family. The Tai Phakes do not keep any matrimonial relations with people of other caste or tribes. Widow and cross-cousin marriage take place in the Tai Phake society. The marriage is celebrated with a detailed ceremony. Divorce is not a common affair in the Tai Phake society. The husband or a wife files a divorce case before the "chow mann" who takes a decision in the meeting of the village elders.

=== Beliefs ===
The Tai Phakes follow Theravada sect of Buddhism with some old animistic beliefs.

== Culture ==
=== Language ===
The Phake language is similar to those of Shan. They have their own separate scripts and also have preserved manuscripts. Most of them are religious scriptures.

The Tai Phake language has 10 vowel phonemes, 18 consonant phonemes, 2 semivowels, 3 diphthongs, and up to 13 consonant clusters.

It is a tonal language and retains 6 prominent tones-rising, falling, high (mid), low high (falling) and low (mid). It is also monosyllabic. Suffixes are added to retain the monosyllabic quality of the words.

Being followers of Theravada Buddhism, the Tai Phake people are also able to read Pali.

=== Houses ===
The houses of the Tai Phakes are elevated bamboo huts. Built on piles of wood above the ground locally known as "haun hang". Materials are like Livistona Jenkinsiana leaves, timber and bamboos are used for its construction. There are two hearts in each house and the inside one is considered as sacred. Every house has a drawing room called "kan nok", a prayer room called "khok pai-frah" with a kitchen called "haun aom".

=== Dress ===
The Tai Phake women wear colourful dresses woven by them. Their outfit consists of an ankle-long skirt ("sheenn"), a blouse open at the front ("nang-wat") and fastened around the armpits and a girdle ("chai-chin") to tighten the skirt around the waist. The female child wears a skirt ("sheenn") and a blouse. A white turban ("pha-ho") is worn by the women folk on individual preference. The colours of their dresses are expressive of their ages. Dresses include dress proper, ornaments and decoration. Dress proper includes articles of personal clothing as are used mainly for the purpose of covering. There are two dresses for Tai Phakes:

- General dress for everyday use.
- Special dress for particular occasions.

A very small amount of ornaments are used as assign of femininity than for enhancing the effectiveness of the personal appearance of the wearer. Decoration which signifies tattooing and marks on the body, is, however, obviously not present where it should be. The Phakes have a fairly elaborate pattern of dresses and nudity or scanty dress is disliked by all. Even a child below the age of five years is rarely seen to go without the dress. Men and women, young and old. Cover their body whether they are inside their residence or outside. The Phakes do not possess any traditional ceremonial dress. On a festive occasion, however, washed clothes are used. For their warm clothes, people depend upon the market products like the coat, sweater, Scarf, Shawl etc.

=== Male costumes ===
The dress of the elderly male is generally house woven checkered lungi (Phaa) of green and black color lined with red, yellow or white yarn, undershirt, one shirt (Sho) and a white turban (Fa Ho). A white scarf (about 2 meters long and 1 meter wide) with a plain border (Fa Fek Mai) and white long sleeved shirt is worn by the elderly people when they go to the Vihar or to any distant places. For their warm clothes, the elderly male persons prefer shawls (Fa Jang). In the congregational prayer, everyone, except the boys and girls below the age of 10 years, wears the scarf.

=== Female costumes ===
The Phake women wear their traditional dresses. The elderly female persons wear one girdle (Chin) around the waist extending up to their ankles. It is just like men's lungi with the differences that the stripes in a Chin are breadth wise and the waist portion of the Chin is much thicker. To cover the upper half of the body, the women use a long stripped cloth called Fa Nangwait, about 2.3 meters long and 1 meter wide. A cloth belt, Chairchin, about 6 centimeters wide and 1.5 meters long) is worn around their waist. Before the attainment of puberty, girls do not wear Fa Nangwait. Instead, they wear white cloth, Fafek, about 2 meters long and 1 meter wide, with or without border, to cover the upper half of the body. If a girl has an unmarried elder sister, she does not wear a Fa Nangwait even though she has attained puberty. Wearing a Fafek is a sign of unpreparedness for marriage. All the women wear a traditional white chaddar when they go to the Vihar or to a distant place. The bride during marriage ceremony uses a similar chaddar as a veil. Elderly women wear a blouse called Chekhamchum, which extends up to the waist. Young girls and the unmarried women wear blouses of different colors but the use of sleeveless or short blouse is not encouraged. The elderly women wear a white turban all the time while the younger married women wear the same when they visit the Vihar or the weekly market. The dress of unmarried grownup girls constitutes a Chin, a Fa Fek Mai and a blouse.

=== Costumes of boys and girls ===
The boys wear trousers and shirts when they go to Naharkatia or to their schools, while in the village they use their traditional lungi. Young girls use bazaar made frocks. The school going girls wear their traditional Chin even in their educational institutions.

=== The dress of the monks ===
There are special clothes for the monks which must be of yellow colour. It was reported that previously when the marketing centers were not easily accessible, the people prepared all their dyes indigenously. The yellow colour was prepared from the yellowish kernel of the Jackfruit tree. The monks wear four kinds of cloths viz; main cloth i.e. a lungi (Cham Paying), one chaddar like cloth (Chang Kan, about 9.3 meters long and 1.5 meters wide) which is used in the upper part of the body, one sanghati i.e. a locally prepared genji and one piece of cloth (about 1.2 meters long and 6 centimeters wide) to cover their secret parts. The eight inevitables (Asta Pariskar) of a monk include the above-mentioned four varieties of clothes and a filter cloth( Jal Chakani), a blade for shaving the head fortnightly and thread and needle.

=== Ornaments ===
For personal adornment, the Phake women wear very few ornaments. In fact, married and elderly women do not show much interest in ornaments. It was reported that till 1950 the elderly women used Kenhu (an ear ornament made of transparent crystal material) but since that year the supply of that material became irregular and the Phake women had to opt for modern ornaments like earring, bracelets, gold ring, necklaces etc. It was also reported that until 1950 necklace made of silver coins was considered as a valuable ornament by the womenfolk, but today this type of necklace is hardly seen. The reason, as reported by the Phake, is that old silver rupee and half rupee coins contained much metal value and the villagers, therefore, exchanged those silver ornaments for a much higher price in terms of new coins, which, however, contain less metal value. The married women wear a pair of bangles (Beyan) made of either gold or silver. Gold or silver ring (Ungehop) is also worn by those who can afford. Necklace made of small beads is worn by the small children in order to avoid dangers from evil spirits. Bead armlets are used by some elderly people for similar purpose. Objects of natural beauty like flowers are special favorites of the teenage girls who wear those in their hair.

=== Hair dressing ===
Most of the Phake women wear their hair long while men crop their hair short, except for those who are following the eight precept of Buddhism.

=== Festivals and practices ===
Poi Sangken is the major festival of the Tai Phakes. It is similar to Songkran which is celebrated in Thailand. It marks the beginning of new year in the Tai calendar. It is celebrated for three days. Basically, it starts from 13 or 14 April every year. In this festival, people throw water on each other which signifies washing away the sins of one another. They also cleanse Buddha images and statues from household shrines as well as from monasteries by gently pouring water over them.

Buddha Purnima is also a major festival of the Tai Phakes. It marks the birthday of Lord Gautama Buddha. On this day the people gather together in the Buddhist Monastery and offer prayers to God. This is followed by a feast. Generally, this festival falls in the month of May.

Naun-wa is a three-month period in which no marriages or construction work are done. This period is considered to be inauspicious. In each month during the day of "purnima" the people of the village gather together in the monastery and offer prayers. It is not a festival but an important religious practice.

Poi Ok-wa is celebrated after the three-months period of "Naun-wa". It marks the end of "Naun-wa". People from different villages and a union of monks gather together in a single village and offer prayers and pray to God to forgive them for their faults.

Poi Mai-ko-chum-fai is a festival which is celebrated during the full moon day of February month. Small piles of wood and hay are set on fire by the people at late evening of this day. During this occasion, they prepare traditional dishes like "khau-laam".

In addition to above the Tai Phake people also celebrate festivals like Poi Lu-fra, Poi Lu-kyong, Poi Kithing, etc.

=== Food habits ===
Rice is the staple food of the Tai Phakes. Their meals consist of cooked or steamed rice wrapped in banana or tara or kau leaves that known as "khau how" and boiled vegetables. Moreover, many wild leafy vegetables such as "pukut", "khi kai" etc. are eaten by them. Beside this their meals comprise meat, fish, eggs, dry fish, sour fish, dry meat, rice cakes. Tea is their favorite beverage.

=== Death ===
Cremation is the rule for normal death. For abnormal ones, burial is prescribed. The purification ceremony, in case of normal death, is observed on the seventh day after death. Entertainment of the villagers with a feast and gift to the monks are the salient features of their purification ceremony. The Tai Phakes have special provision for the disposal of the dead body of a monk. The monk's dead body is not disposed on the same day, rather it is kept for a year or so in a watertight coffin. After about one year a big festival is arranged and all the Tai Phakes of different villages are invited and the dead body of the monk is ceremonially cremated.

== See also ==
- Tai peoples
- Tai languages
- History of the Tai-Phake people in northeast India
