= Tai peoples =

Descendants of speakers of a common Tai language

Tai
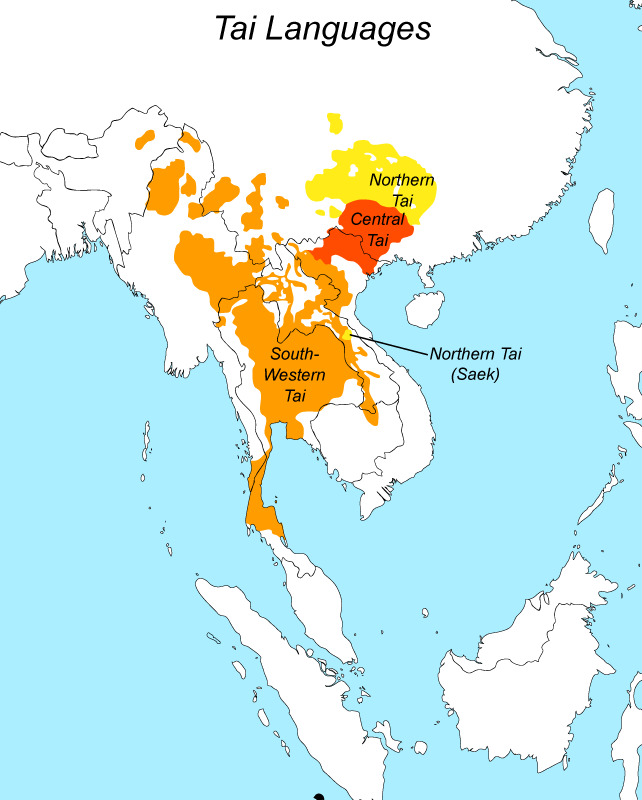
- Distribution of Tai people

Regions with significant populations
- Southeast Asia; Myanmar (Tai Yai); Laos; Thailand; Vietnam; South Asia; India (Tai Khamti, Tai Ahom, Tai Phake, Tai Aiton, Tai Turung, and Tai Laing); East Asia; China (Dai people, Zhuang people, Bouyei people)

Languages
- Tai languages

Religion
- Majority: Theravada Buddhism; Tai folk religion, Hinduism (Ekasarana Dharma, Vaishnavism)

Tai peoples are the populations who speak (or formerly spoke) the Tai languages. There are a total of about 93 million people of Tai ancestry worldwide, with the largest ethnic groups being Dai, Thai, Isan, Lao, Shan, Ahom, Zhuang, Tày, Nùng, Táy, and Yuan.

The Tai are scattered through much of South China and Mainland Southeast Asia, with some (e.g. Tai Ahom, Tai Khamti, Tai Phake, Tai Aiton) inhabiting parts of Northeast India. Tai peoples are both culturally and genetically very similar and therefore primarily identified through their language.

== Names ==
Speakers of the many languages in the Tai branch of the Tai–Kadai language family are spread over many countries in Southern China, Indochina and Northeast India. Unsurprisingly, there are many terms used to describe the distinct Tai peoples of these regions.

According to Michel Ferlus, the ethnonyms Tai/Thai (or Tay/Thay) evolved from the etymon *k(ə)ri: 'human being' through the following chain: kəri: > kəli: > kədi:/kədaj (-l- > -d- shift in tense sesquisyllables and probable diphthongization of -i: > -aj). This in turn changed to di:/daj (presyllabic truncation and probable diphthongization -i: > -aj). And then to *daj^{A} (Proto-Southwestern Tai) > tʰaj^{A2} (in Siamese and Lao) or > taj^{A2} (in the other Southwestern and Central Tai languages by Li Fangkuei). Michel Ferlus' work is based on some simple rules of phonetic change observable in the Sinosphere and studied for the most part by William H. Baxter (1992).

The ethnonym and autonym of the Lao people together with the ethnonym Gelao ), a Kra population scattered from Guìzhōu (China) to North Vietnam, and Sino-Vietnamese 'Jiao' as in Jiaozhi, the name of North Vietnam given by the ancient Chinese, would have emerged from the Austro-Asiatic *k(ə)ra:w 'human being'.

The etymon *k(ə)ra:w would have also yielded the ethnonym Keo/ Kæw kɛːw^{A1}, a name given to the Vietnamese by Tai speaking peoples, currently slightly derogatory. In fact, Keo/ Kæw kɛːw^{A1} was an exonym used to refer to Tai speaking peoples, as in the epic poem of Thao Cheuang, and was only later applied to the Vietnamese. In Pupeo (Kra branch), kew is used to name the Tay (Central Tai) of North Vietnam.

The name "Lao" is used almost exclusively by the majority population of Laos, the Lao people, and two of the three other members of the Lao-Phutai subfamily of Southwestern Tai: Isan speakers (occasionally), the Nyaw or Yaw and the Phu Thai.

The Zhuang in China do not constitute an autonymic unity. In various areas in Guangxi, they refer to themselves as pow^{C2} ɕu:ŋ^{B2}, pʰo^{B2} tʰaj^{A2}, pow^{C2} ma:n^{A2}, pow^{C2} ba:n^{C1}, or pow^{C2} law^{A2}, while those in Yunnan use the following autonyms: pu^{C2} noŋ^{A2}, bu^{B2} daj^{A2}, or bu^{C2} jaj^{C1} (=Bouyei, bùyi 布依). The Zhuang do not constitute a linguistic unity either, because Chinese authorities include within this group some distinct ethnic groups such as the Lachi speaking a Kra language.

The Nung living on both sides of the Sino-Vietnamese border have their ethnonym derived from clan name Nong, whose bearers dominated what are now north Vietnam and Guangxi in the 11th century AD. In 1038, a Nong general named Nong Quanfu established a Nung state in Cao Bang, however was quickly annexed by Annamite king Ly Thai Tong in the next year. In 1048, Quanfu's son Nong Zhigao revolted against Annamese rule, and then marched eastwards to besiege Guangzhou in 1052.

Another name that's shared between the Nung, the Tay, and the Zhuang living along the Sino-Vietnamese border is Tho, which literally means autochthonous. However, this term was also applied to the Tho people, who are a separate group of indigenous speakers of Vietic languages, who have come under the influence of Tai culture.

== History ==
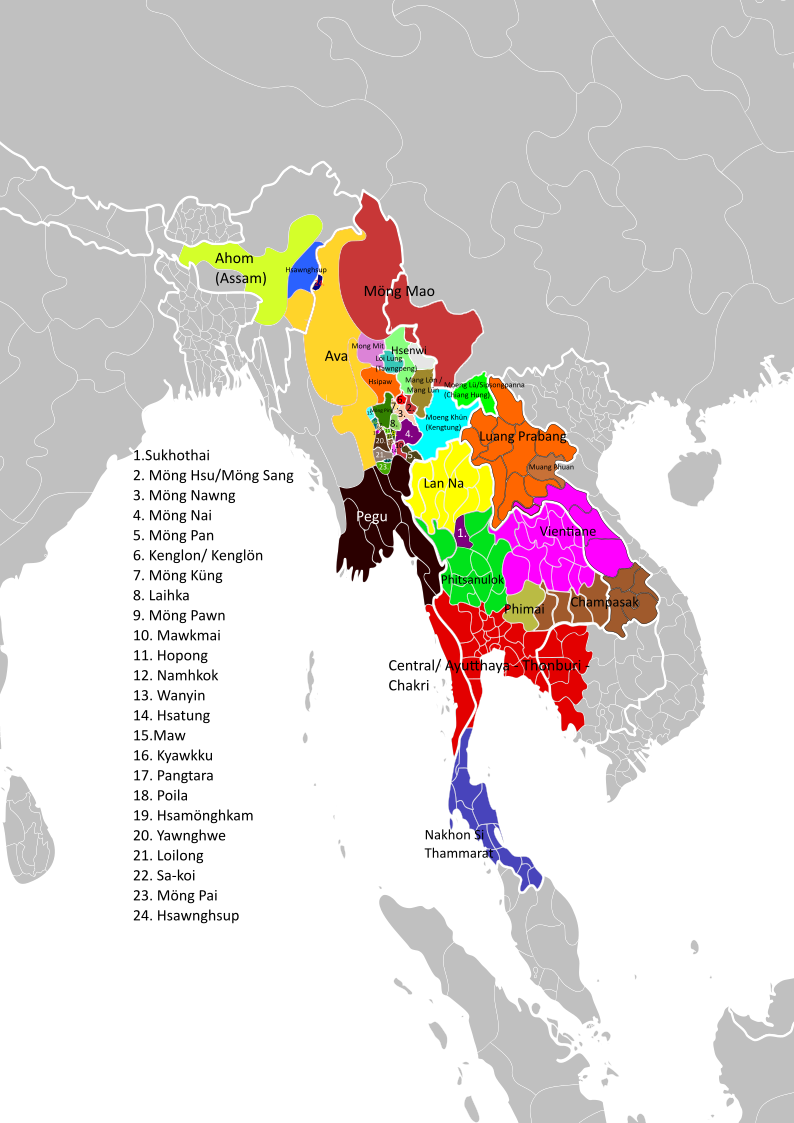
A historical map of Southeast Asian kingdoms and states with documented Tai-speaking populations (partial or total).

=== Origin ===
James R. Chamberlain (2016) proposes that the Tai-Kadai (Kra-Dai) language family was formed as early as the 12th century BC in the middle of the Yangtze basin, coinciding roughly with the establishment of the Chu state and the beginning of the Zhou dynasty. Following the southward migrations of Kra and Hlai (Rei/Li) peoples around the 8th century BCE, the Yue (Be-Tai people) started to break away and move to the east coast in the present-day Zhejiang province, in the 6th century BCE, forming the state of Yue and conquering the state of Wu shortly thereafter. According to Chamberlain, Yue people (Be-Tai) began to migrate southwards along the east coast of China to what are now Guangxi, Guizhou and northern Vietnam, after Yue was conquered by Chu around 333 BCE. There the Yue (Be-Tai) formed the Luo Yue, which moved into Lingnan and Annam and then westward into northeastern Laos and Sip Song Chau Tai, and later became the Central-Southwestern Tai, followed by the Xi Ou, which became the Northern Tai).

Comparative linguistic research seems to indicate that the Tai peoples were a Proto-Tai–Kadai speaking culture of southern China and dispersed into mainland Southeast Asia. Some linguists proposes that Tai–Kadai languages may descended from the Proto-Austronesian language family. Laurent Sagart (2004) hypothesized that the Tai–Kadai languages may have originated on the island of Taiwan, where they spoke a dialect of Proto-Austronesian or one of its descendant languages. Unlike the Malayo-Polynesian group who later sailed south to the Philippines and other parts of maritime Southeast Asia, the ancestors of the modern Tai-Kadai people sailed west to mainland China and possibly traveled along the Pearl River, where their language greatly changed from other Austronesian languages under the influence of Sino-Tibetan and Hmong–Mien language infusion. However, no archaeological evidence has been identified which would correspond to the Daic (Tai-Kadai) expansion in its earliest phases. Aside from linguistic evidence, the connection between Austronesian and Tai-Kadai can also be found in some common cultural practices. Roger Blench (2008) demonstrates that dental evulsion, face tattooing, teeth blackening and snake cults are shared between the Taiwanese Austronesians and the Tai-Kadai peoples of Southern China.

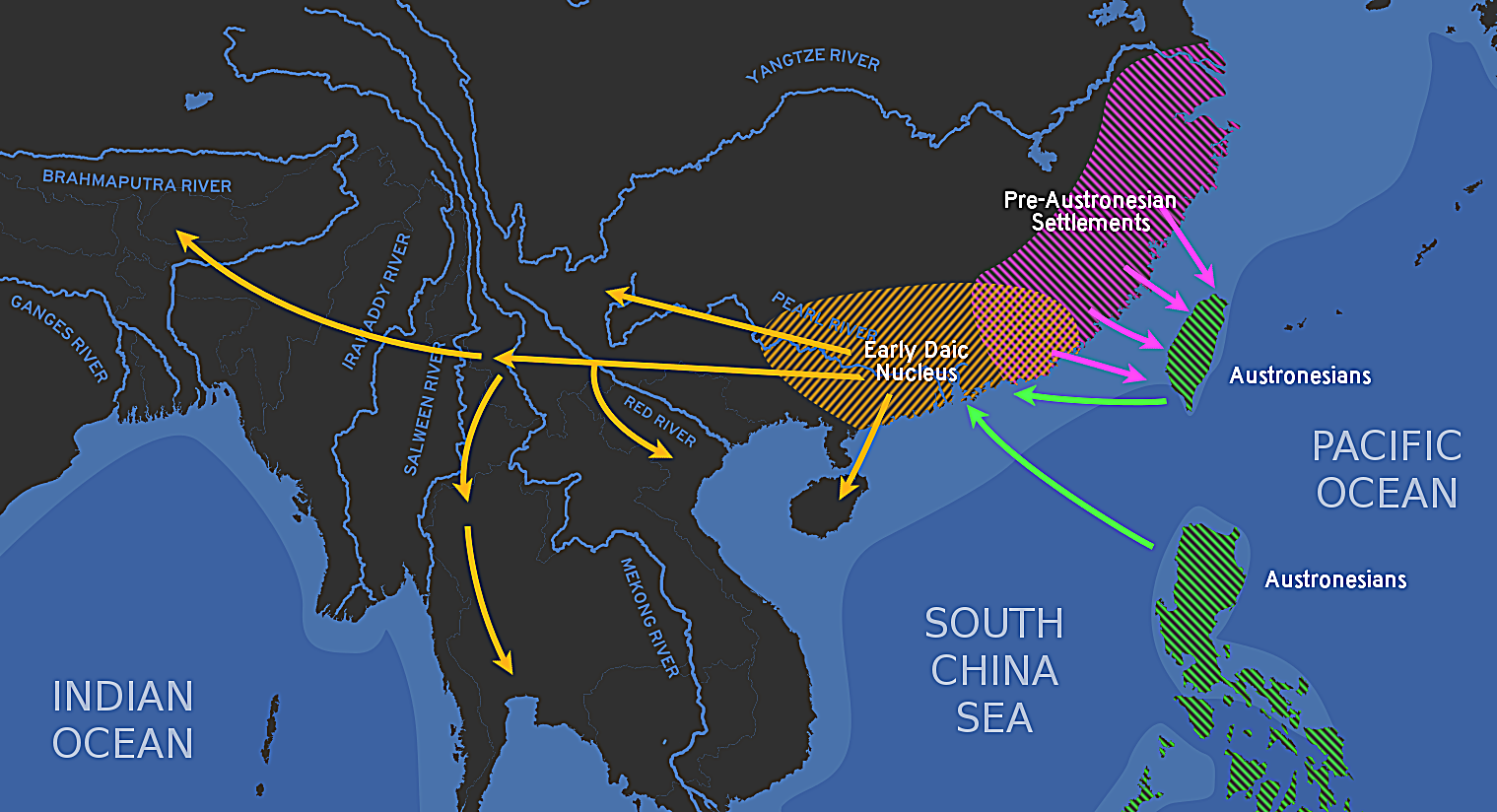
Proposed genesis of Daic languages and their relation with Austronesian languages (Blench, 2018)

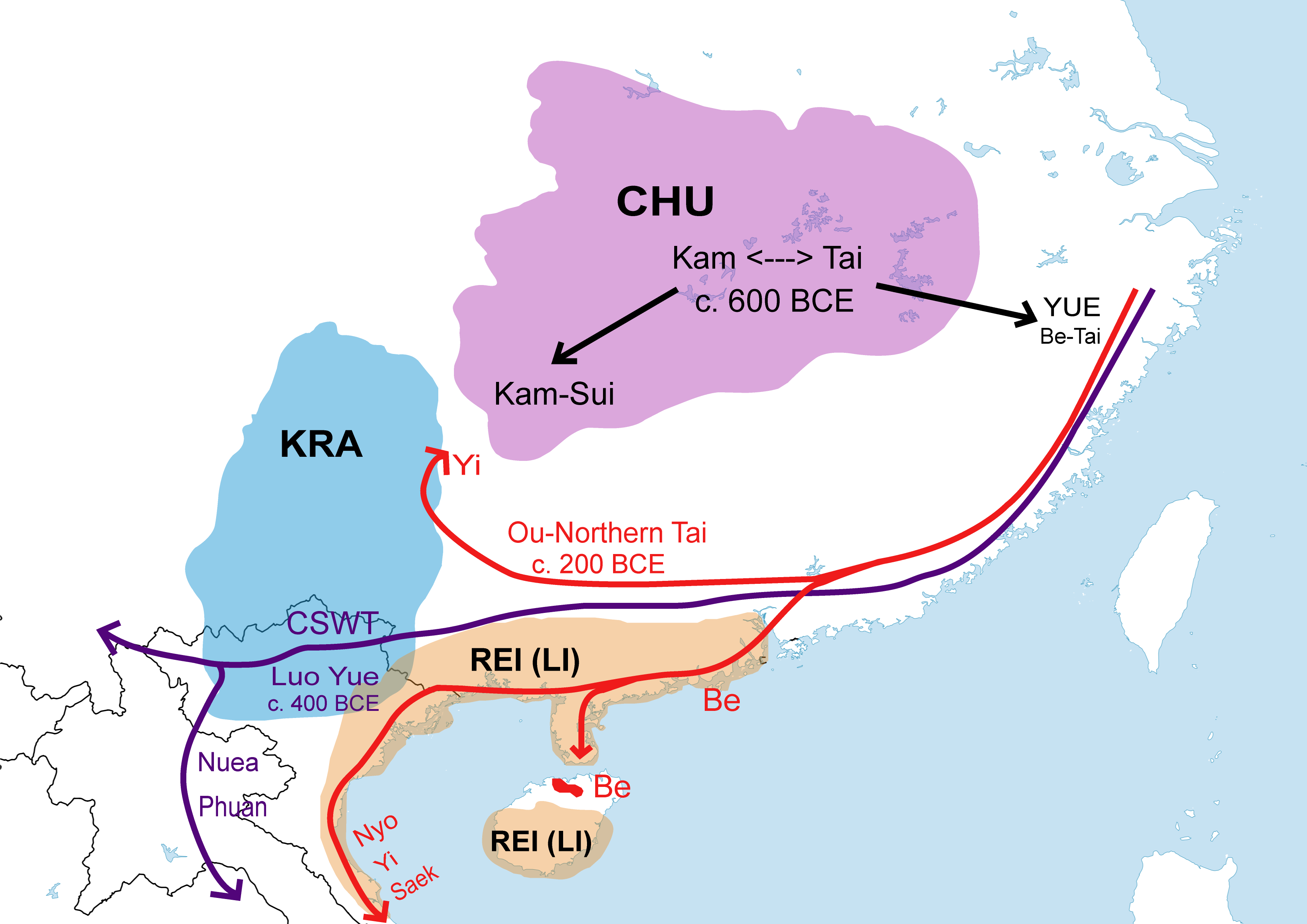
Kra-Dai (Tai-Kadai) migration route according to James R. Chamberlain (2016).

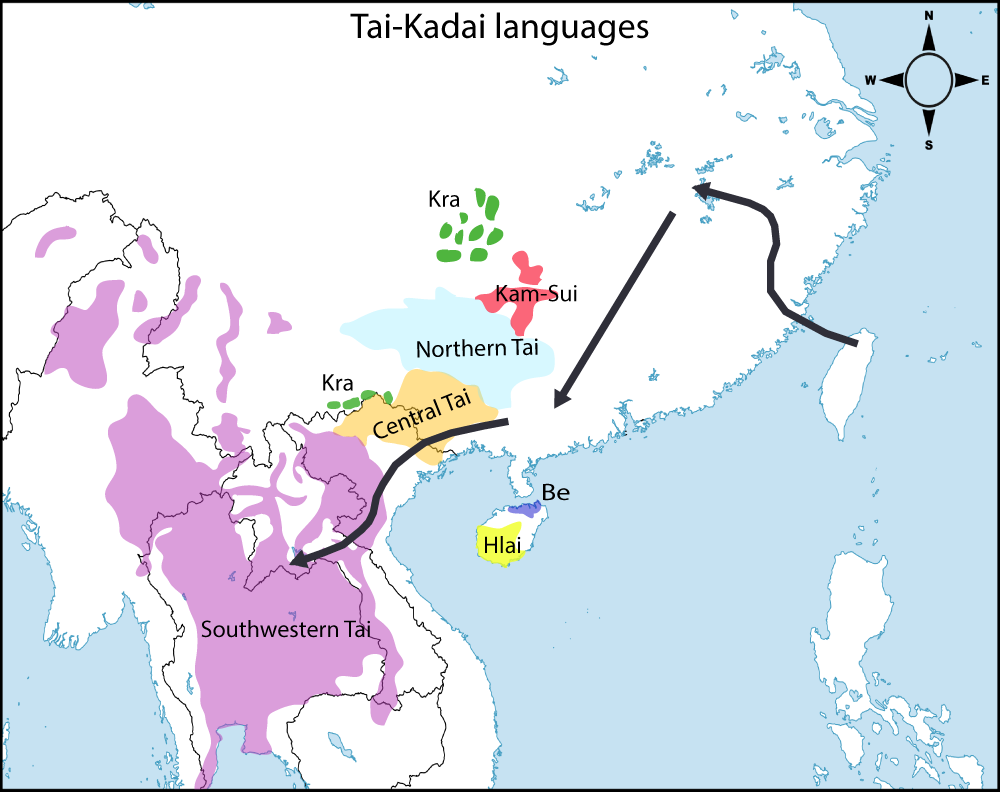
Tai-Kadai migration route according to Matthias Gerner's Northeast to Southwest Hypothesis.

=== Early history in China and migration to Southeast Asia ===
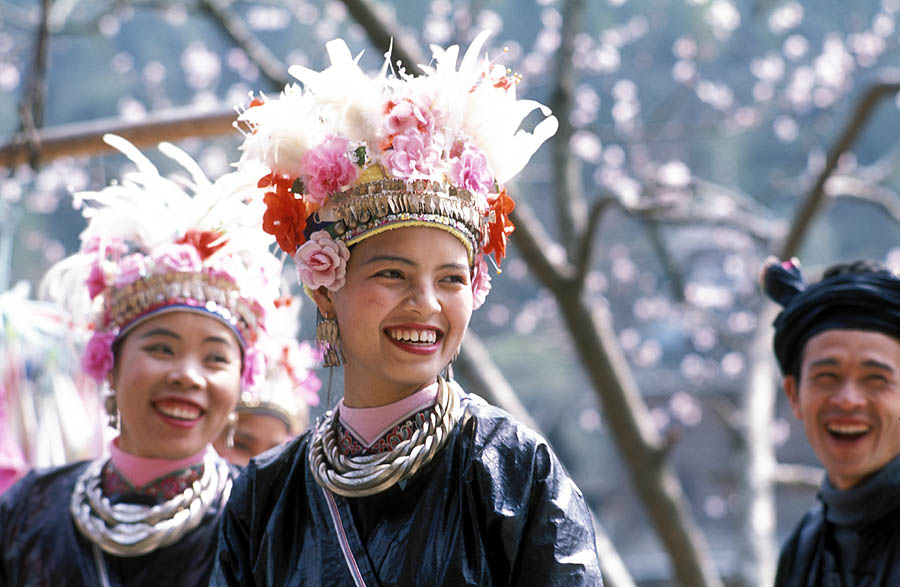
Tai Dong or Kam people of Guizhou, China, in traditional dresses, similar to the existing tribe in northern provinces of Thailand

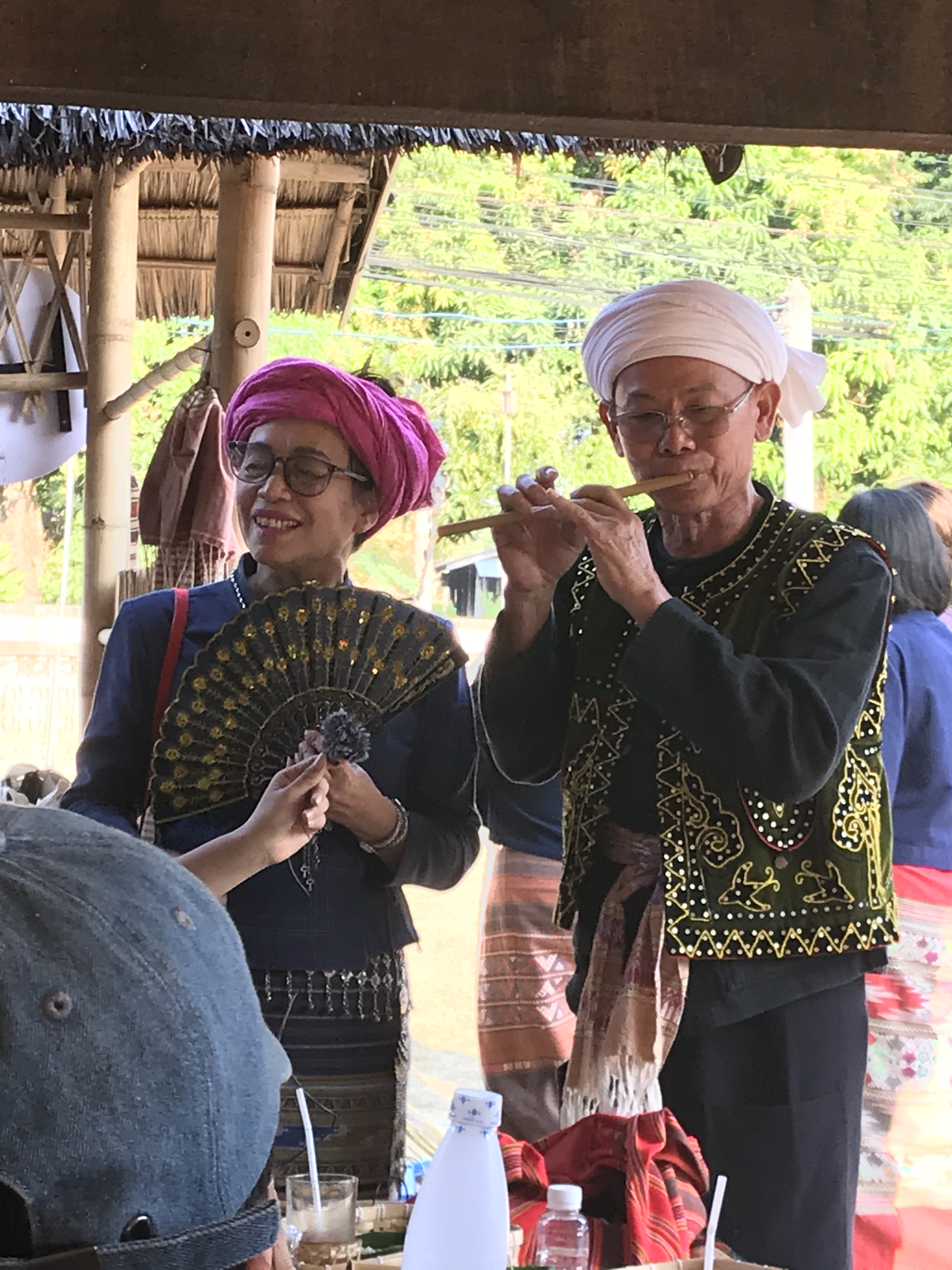
Tai Lue or Dai Lue people in traditional costumes. They are also known as Xishuangbanna Dai, Sipsongpanna Tailurian and Tai Sipsongpanna

Map showing linguistic family tree overlaid on a geographic distribution map of Tai-Kadai family. This map only shows general pattern of the migration of Tai-speaking tribes, not specific routes, which would have snaked along the rivers and over the lower passes.

The Tai peoples, from Guangxi began moving south – and westwards in the first millennium CE, eventually spreading across the whole of mainland Southeast Asia. Based on layers of Chinese loanwords in proto-Southwestern Tai and other historical evidence, Pittayawat Pittayaporn (2014) proposes that the southwestward migration of southwestern Tai-speaking tribes from the modern Guangxi to the mainland of Southeast Asia must have taken place sometime between the 8th–10th centuries. Tai speaking tribes migrated southwestward along the rivers and over the lower passes into Southeast Asia, perhaps prompted by the Chinese expansion and suppression. Chinese historical texts record that, in 726 AD, hundreds of thousands Lǎo (獠) (Note: The term Lǎo (獠) used in this context refers to Tai-Kadai speaking peoples resided in what are now Guangdong, Guangxi, and northern Vietnam in general. It is unnecessarily applied solely to the ancestors of Laotians (ລາວ).) rose in revolt behind Liang Ta-hai in Guangdong, but was suppressed by Chinese general Yang Zixu, which left 20,000 rebels killed and beheaded. Two years later, another Li chief named Chen Xingfan declared himself the Emperor of Nanyue and led a large uprising against the Chinese, but was also crushed by Yang Zixu, who beheaded 60,000 rebels. In 756, another revolt led by Huang Chien-yao and Chen Ch'ung-yu that attracted 200,000 followers and lasted four years in Guangxi. In the 860s, many local people in what is now north Vietnam sided with attackers from Nanchao, and in the aftermath some 30,000 of them were beheaded. In the 1040s, a powerful matriarch-shamaness by the name of A Nong, her chiefly husband, and their son, Nong Zhigao, raised a revolt, took Nanning, besieged Guangzhou for fifty seven days, and slew the commanders of five Chinese armies sent against them before they were defeated, and many of their leaders were killed. The Ahomese Tai chronicle relates the migrating event with the arrival of "9,000 Tai peoples, 8 noblemen, two elephants, and 300 horses" to Assam. Vietnamese scribers recorded groups of two- or three thousand "Mang savages" passing by. According to Baker, those migrants might have slowly exodused from their homeland via three routes. The early groups moved north to Guizhou. The second groups might have passed through the Red River Delta, crossing the Vietnamese cordillera into the Mekong Valley. The third and major migration direction crossed the valleys of the Red and Black River, heading west through the hills into Burma and Assam.

As a result of these three bloody centuries, or with the political and cultural pressures from the north, some Tai peoples migrated southwestward, where they met the classical Indianized civilizations of Southeast Asia. Du Yuting and Chen Lufan from Kunming Institute Southeast Asian Studies claimed that, during the Western Han dynasty, ancestors of the Tai people were known as Dianyue (in today Yunnan). (Note: The Dianyue are alternatively proposed to have spoken a Tibeto-Burman language instead.) Tai peoples migrated far and wide: by the Tang and Song periods, they were present from the Red River to the Salween River, from Baoshan to Jingdong. Du & Chen linked the ancestors of Thai people in modern-Thailand, in particular, to a 2nd-century Shan kingdom (Shànguó 撣國) mentioned in the Book of Later Han, which located the Shan kingdom "at the end of the boundaries of what is now Baoshan and Deihong Prefectures" and stated that Shan ambassadors came to the Han court from "beyond Yongchang" and "beyond Rinan". Additionally, Du & Chen rejected the proposal that the ancestors of Tai people migrated en masse southwestwards out of Yunnan only after the 1253 Mongol invasion of Dali. Luo et al. (2000) proposed that Proto-Tais originated most likely from Guangxi-Guizhou, not Yunnan nor the middle Yangtze river.

=== Early city-states in Southeast Asia ===
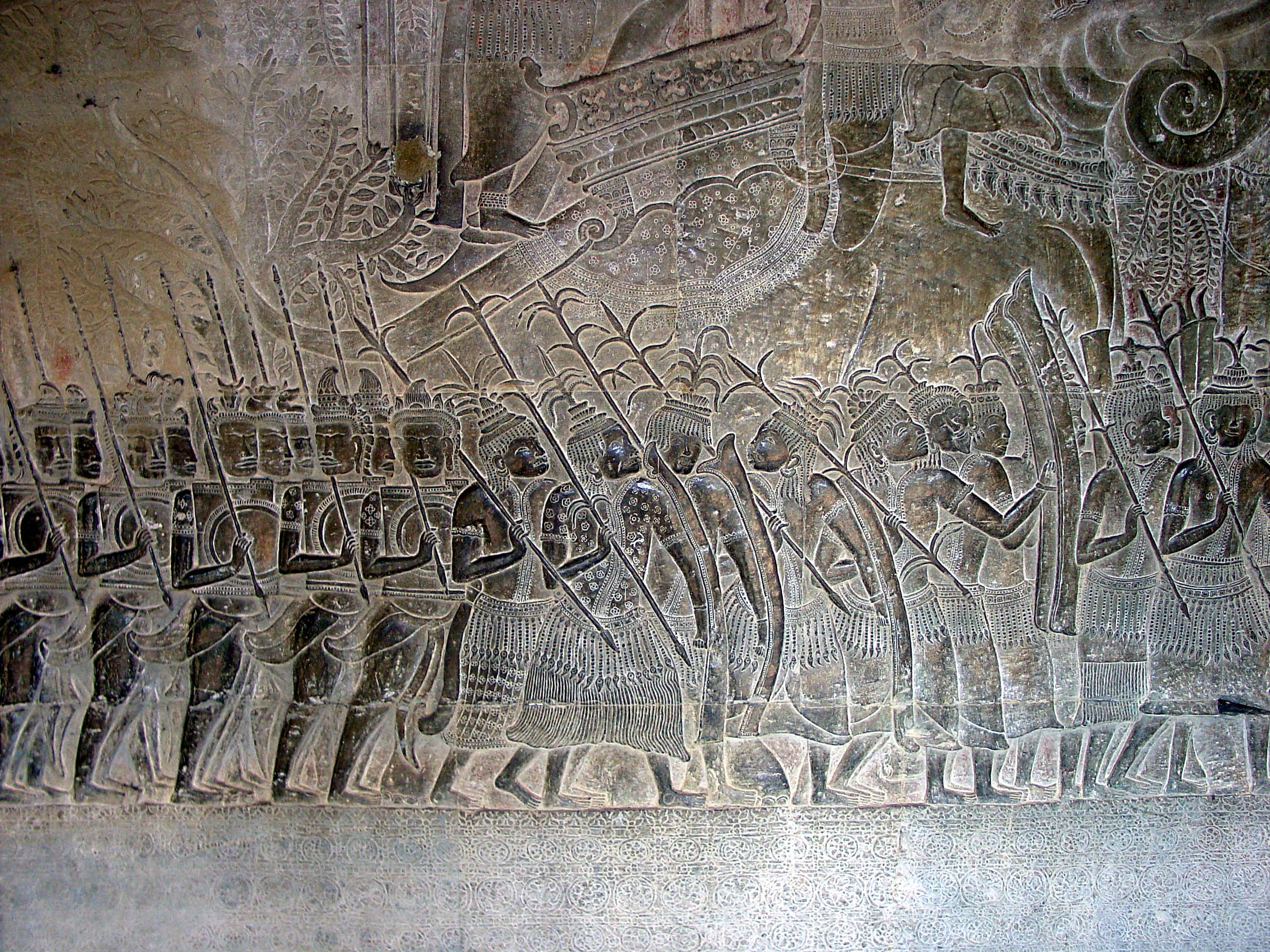
The consensus of modern scholars is that the 12th century marching “Syam Kuk” aren't the Tai/Siamese (ethnic Thai). Michael Vickery documents the usage of Syam, Sien, Siam, and the Chinese Hsien by the Cham, Khmer, and Chinese to explain syām kuk doesn’t refer to an ethnicity but a geographic location, specifically the southern centrail plains of modern Thailand that was populated by the Mon-Khmer in the 12th century. .

The Tai migrants assimilated and intermarried with the indigenous Austroasiatic peoples of Southeast Asia, or pushing them off to marginal areas, but their full expansion was halted by the Indian-influenced kingdoms of the Mon, Khmer and Cham, although the Khmer were the primary power in Southeast Asia by the time of the Tai migrations. The Tai formed small city-states known as mueang under Khmer suzerainty on the outskirts of the Khmer Empire, building the irrigation infrastructure and paddy fields for the wet-rice cultivation methods of the Tai people. Tai legends of Khun Borom, shared among various Southwestern Tai peoples of Southeast Asia, Greater Assam and Yunnan, concerns the first ruler of Meuang Thaen, whose progeny go on to find the Tai dynasties that ruled over the various Tai mueang.

The Tais from the north gradually settled in the Chao Phraya valley from the tenth century onwards, in lands of the Dvaravati culture, assimilating the earlier Austroasiatic Mon and Khmer people, as well as coming into contact with the Khmer Empire. The Tais who came to the area of present-day Thailand were engulfed into the Theravada Buddhism of the Mon and the Hindu-Khmer culture and statecraft. Therefore, the Thai culture is a mixture of Tai traditions with Indic, Mon, and Khmer influences.

The formidable political control exercised by the Khmer Empire extended not only over the centre of the Khmer province, where the majority of the population was Khmer, but also to outer border provinces likely populated by non-Khmer peoples—including areas to the north and northeast of modern Bangkok, the lower central plain and the upper Ping River in the Lamphun-Chiang Mai region. The Tai people were the predominant non-Khmer groups in the areas of central Thailand that formed the geographical periphery of the Khmer Empire. Some Tai groups were probably assimilated into the Khmer population. Historical records show that the Tai maintained their cultural distinctiveness, although their animist religion partially gave way to Buddhism. Tai historical documents note that the period of the Khmer Empire was one of great internal strife. During the 11th and 12th centuries, territories with a strong Tai presence, such as Lavo (in what is now north-central Thailand), resisted Khmer control.

The Tai, from their new home in Southeast Asia, were influenced by the indianization Mon and khmer. Most importantly Buddhist India, the Tai kingdom of Lanna was founded in 1259 (in the north of modern Thailand). The Sukhothai Kingdom was founded in 1279 (in modern Thailand) and expanded eastward to take the city of Chantaburi and renamed it to Vieng Chan Vieng Kham (modern Vientiane) and northward to the city of Muang Sua which was taken in 1271 and renamed the city to Xieng Dong Xieng Thong or "City of Flame Trees beside the River Dong," (modern Luang Prabang, Laos). The Tai peoples had firmly established control in areas to the northeast of the declining Khmer Empire. Following the death of the Sukhothai king Ram Khamhaeng, and internal disputes within the kingdom of Lanna, both Vieng Chan Vieng Kham (Vientiane) and Xieng Dong Xieng Thong (Luang Prabang) were independent city-states until the founding of the kingdom of Lan Xang in 1354. The Sukhothai Kingdom and later the Ayutthaya kingdom were established and "...conquered the Khmers of the upper and central Menam valley and greatly extended their territory."

=== Ming dynasty Tai history ===
During the Ming dynasty in China, attempts were made to subjugate, control, tax, and settle ethnic Han along the lightly populated frontier of Yunnan with Southeast Asia (modern-day Burma, Thailand, Laos, and Vietnam). This frontier region was inhabited by many small Tai chieftainships or states as well as other Tibeto-Burman and Mon–Khmer ethnic groups.

The Ming Shi-lu records the relations between the Ming court in Beijing and the Tai-Yunnan frontier as well as Ming military actions and diplomacy along the frontier.

==== First Ming communication with Yunnan (1369) ====
The first communication between the Ming dynasty and Yunnan was in a formal "letter of instruction" using ritual language. Submission to the Ming was described as part of the cosmological order:

"From ancient times, those who have been lords of all under Heaven have looked on that which is covered by Heaven, that which is contained by the Earth and that on which the sun and moon shine, and regardless of whether the place was near or far, or what manner of people they are, there was no place for which they did not wish a peaceful land and a prosperous existence. It is natural that when China is governed peacefully, foreign countries would come and submit (來附)"…I am anxious that, as you are secluded in your distant places, you have not yet heard of my will. Thus, I am sending envoys to go and instruct you, so that you will all know of this" (14 July 1370).

==== Initial Ming attempts to win Yunnan over (1369–1380) ====
The Mongol prince Basalawarmi ruled Yunnan under the Yuan dynasty from the capital in Kunming. He ruled indirectly over an ethnically diverse collection of small polities and chieftainships. The most powerful of these states was controlled by the Duan family who ruled over the area surrounding Dali.

The Ming Shi-lu reports that envoys were sent to instruct the inhabitants of Yunnan in 1371. In 1372 the famous scholar Wang Wei offered terms of surrender to Yunnan as an envoy. The envoy Wang Wei was murdered in 1374 and another mission was sent in 1375. Once again the mission failed. A diplomatic mission was sent to Burma in 1374, but because Annam was at war with Champa the roads were blocked and the mission was recalled. By 1380 the Ming were no longer wording their communications as if Yunnan was a separate country. Initial gentle promptings were soon to be followed by military force.

== Languages ==
Map of the Chinese plain at the start of the Warring States period in the 5th century BC, showing the locations of the states of Chu and Wu.

Tai languages spoken today use incredibly diverse scripts, from Chinese characters to abugida scripts. The high diversity of Kra–Dai languages in southern China possibly points to the origin of the Kra–Dai language family in southern China. The Tai branch moved south into Southeast Asia only around 1000 AD. Chinese epigraphic materials from Chu texts show clear substrate influence predominantly from Tai-Kadai, and a few items of Austroasiatic and Hmong-Mien origin.

=== External relationships ===
In a paper published in 2004, the linguist Laurent Sagart hypothesized that the proto-Tai–Kadai language originated as an Austronesian language that migrants carried from Taiwan to mainland China. Afterwards, the language was then heavily influenced by local languages from Sino-Tibetan, Hmong–Mien, or other families, borrowing much vocabulary and converging typologically. Later, Sagart (2008) introduces a numeral-based model of Austronesian phylogeny, in which Tai-Kadai is considered as a later form of FATK, (Note: Formosan ancestor of Tai-Kadai.) a branch of Austronesian belonging to subgroup Puluqic developed in Taiwan, whose speakers migrated back to the mainland, both to Guangdong, Hainan and northern Vietnam around the second half of the 3rd millennium BCE. Upon their arrival in this region, they underwent linguistic contact with an unknown population, resulting in a partial relexification of FATK vocabulary. On the other hand, Weera Ostapirat supports a coordinate relationship between Tai-Kadai and Austronesian, based on a number of phonological correspondences. The following are Tai-Kadai and Austronesian lexical items showing the genetic connection between these two language families:

Evidence for Tai-Kadai and Austronesian links
Gloss	PAN	PTK	Tai	Kam-Sui	Hlai	Kra (Laha)
Water	*daNum	*(C)aNam	nam	nam	nom	—
Tooth	*nipen	*lipan	fan	wjan	phen	pan (G)
Nose	*ijuŋ (PMP)	*(ʔ)idaŋ	daŋ	ʔnaŋ	doŋ	daŋ
Live, raw	*qudip	*Kud-	dip	ʔdjup	ri:p	kthop (Tm)
Fart	*qe(n)tut	*Kət-	tot	tət	thu:t	tut (By)
Pungent (Note: According to Ostapirat (2005:119), glosses are given according to Tai-Kadai. The typical meaning of this word in Austronesian is *paqiC "bitter".)	*paqiC	—	phet	—	geȶ	pat
Fowl, bird (Note: The typical PAN root for "bird" is *qayam. The cited form *manuk is reconstructed for PMP, with semantic shift from "chicken" to "bird".)	*manuk (PMP)	*maN-	nok	nok	no:k (Bd)	nok
Taro	*biRaq	—	phɯak	ʔɣaak	ge:k (Bd)	haak
Weep	*Caŋis	—	hai	ʔɲe	ŋei	ɲit
Star (Note: According to Ostapirat (2005:119), glosses are given according to Tai-Kadai. The typical meaning of this word in Austronesian is *qalejaw "sun".)	*qalejaw	*Kada:w	daaw	ʔdaau (M)	ra:u	—
Fire	*Sapuy	*(C)apuj	fai	wi	pei	pəi
Navel (Note: According to Ostapirat (2005:119), glosses are given according to Tai-Kadai. The typical meaning of this word in Austronesian is *pudeR "kidney".)	*pudeR	—	dɯɯ	ʔdaa	reɯ	dau
Head louse	*kuCu	*KuTu:	hau	tu	tshou	tou
Eye	*maCa	*maTa:	taa	daa	tsha	taa

Evidence for Tai-Kadai and Austronesian links
Gloss	PAN	PTK	Tai	Kam-Sui	Hlai	Kra (Laha)
I	*aku	*aku:	kuu	—	hou (Bd)	kuu (By)
You	*kamu	—	mɯŋ	maa	meɯ	maa (By)
Leg	*paqa	*paq-	khaa	qaa	ha (Ts)	kaa
Excrement	*Caqi	—	khii	qe	hai	kai
Hand	*(qa)lima	*(C)imɤ:	mɯɯ	mjaa	meɯ	maa
Bear	*Cumay	*Tum-	mii	ʔmi	mui	me
Otter	*Sanaq	—	naak	—	na:ʔ	—
This	*i-ni	—	nii	naai	nei	nəi
Sesame	*leŋa	—	ŋaa	ʔŋaa	keɯ (Bd)	ŋaa (By)
Shoulder	*qabaRa	*Kab-	baa	wie (Lk)	va	baa
Black	*tidem	—	dam	ʔnam	dom	ʔdam (By)
Saliva	*ŋalay	—	laai	ŋwee (K)	la:i	laai (By)
Head	*qulu	*Kuɭ-	klau	kɣo (Ml)	rau	—
Sour	*qa(l)sem	*Kəts-	som	fum	—	—

- PAN = proto-Austronesian, PMP = proto-Malayo-Polynesian, PTK = proto-Tai-Kadai
- M = Mak, Bd = Hlai of Baoding, G = Gelao, Tm = ?, By = Buyang, Lk = Lakkja, K = Kam, Ml = Mulam, Ts = Hlai of Tongshi
- Ostapirat (2013:3–8) did not provide full reconstructed forms for many of the proto-Tai-Kadai lexical items cited in the above tables

Distribution of languages in ancient East Asia proposed by J. Marshall Unger (2013), which includes pre-Austronesian / Austro-Tai.

== Genetics ==
Tai people tend to have high frequencies of Y-DNA haplogroup O-M95 (including its O-M88 subclade, which also has been found with high frequency among Vietnamese and among Kuy people in Laos, where they are also known as Suy, Soai, or Souei, and Cambodia), moderate frequencies of Y-DNA haplogroup O-M122 (especially its O-M117 subclade, like speakers of Tibeto-Burman languages), and moderate to low frequencies of haplogroup O-M119. It is believed that the O-M119 Y-DNA haplogroup is associated with both the Austronesian people and the Tai. The prevalence of Y-DNA haplogroup O-M175 among Austronesian and Tai peoples suggests a common ancestry with speakers of the Austroasiatic, Sino-Tibetan, and Hmong–Mien languages some 30,000 years ago in China (Haplogroup O (Y-DNA)). Y-DNA haplogroup O-M95 is found at high frequency among most Tai peoples, which is a trait that they share with the neighboring ethnic Austroasiatic peoples as well as Austronesian peoples in Mainland Southeast Asia (e.g. Cham in Bình Thuận Province of Vietnam, Jarai in Ratanakiri Province of Cambodia, Giarai and Ede in the Central Highlands region of Vietnam), Malaysia, Singapore, and western Indonesia. Y-DNA haplogroups O-M95, O-M119, and O-M122 all are subclades of O-M175, a genetic mutation that has been estimated to have originated approximately 40,000 years ago, somewhere in China.

A recent genetic and linguistic analysis in 2015 showed great genetic homogeneity between Kra-Dai speaking people, suggesting a common ancestry and a large replacement of former non-Kra-Dai groups in Southeast Asia. Kra-Dai populations are closest to southern Chinese and Taiwanese populations.

== Social organization ==
The Tai practice a type of feudal governance that is fundamentally different from that of the Han Chinese people, and is especially adapted to state formation in ethnically and linguistically diverse montane environments centered on valleys suitable for wet-rice cultivation. The form of society is a highly stratified one. The Tai lived in the lowland and river valleys of mainland Southeast Asia. Assorted ethnic and linguistic group lived in the hills. The Tai village consisted of nuclear families working as subsistence rice farmers, living in small houses elevated above the ground. Households bonded together for protection from external attacks and to share the burden of communal repairs and maintenance. Within the village, a council of elders was created to help settle problems, organise festivals and rites and manage the village. Villages would combine to form a Mueang (Thai: เมือง), a group of villages governed by a Chao (Thai: เจ้า) (lord).

== List of Southwestern Tai peoples ==
=== Northern branch ===
- Shan
- Tai Ya
- Tai Nüa
- Khamti
- Tai Phake
- Tai Aiton
- Tai Ahom
- Tai Leng
- Turung
- Sapa

=== Chiang Saen branch ===
- Thai
- Tai Yuan
- Lao
- Tai peoples of Vietnam
  - Tai Dam
  - Tai Daeng
  - Tai Dón
  - Tai Hang Tong
  - Tày Tac
- Tai Lü
- Khün
- Phuan
- Thai Song

=== Southern group ===
- Southern Thai

=== Southwestern Tai groups and names in China ===
Chinese	Pinyin	Tai Lü	Tai Nüa	Thai	Conventional	Area(s)
傣仂 （西雙版納傣）	Dǎilè (Xīshuāngbǎnnà Dǎi)	tai˥˩ lɯː˩		ไทลื้อ	Tai Lü, Tai Lue	Xishuangbanna (China)
傣那 （德宏傣）	Dǎinà (Déhóng Dǎi)	tai˥˩ nəː˥	tai le6	ไทเหนือ, ไทใต้คง	Tai Nüa, Northern Tai, Upper Tai, Chinese Shan	Dehong (China); Burma
傣擔	Dǎidān	tai˥˩ dam˥		ไทดำ, ลาวโซ่ง, ผู้ไท	Tai Dam, Black Tai, Tai Lam, Lao Song Dam*, Tai Muan, Tai Tan, Black Do, Jinping Dai, Tai Den, Tai Do, Tai Noir, Thai Den	Jinping (China), Laos, Thailand
傣繃	Dǎibēng	tai˥˩pɔːŋ˥		ไทเมา	Tay Pong	Ruili, Gengma (China), along the Mekong
傣端	Dǎiduān	tai˥˩doːn˥		ไทขาว	White Tai, Tày Dón, Tai Khao, Tai Kao, Tai Don, Dai Kao, White Dai, Red Tai, Tai Blanc, Tai Kaw, Tày Lai, Thai Trang	Jinping (China)
傣雅	Dǎiyǎ	tai˥˩jaː˧˥		ไทหย่า	Tai Ya, Tai Cung, Cung, Ya	Xinping, Yuanjiang (China)
傣友	Dǎiyǒu	tai˥˩jiu˩		ไทแดง		Yuanyang (China), along the Red River
* lit. "Lao [wearing] black trousers"

== Other Tai peoples and languages ==
Listed below are lesser-known Tai peoples and languages.

- Bazia (八甲 )– 1,106 people in Mengkang Village 勐康村, Meng'a Township 勐阿镇, Menghai County, Yunnan, who speak a language closely related to Tai Lü. They are classified by the Chinese government as ethnic Dai people. In Meng'a Town, they are in the village clusters of Mengkang 勐康 (in Shangnadong 上纳懂, Xianadong 下纳懂, and Mandao 曼倒), Hejian 贺建 (in villages 6, 7, and 8), and Najing 纳京 (in villages 6, 7, and 8). Zhang (2013) reports that there are 218 households and 816 people in 14 villages, and that the Bajia language is mutually intelligible with Tai. Another group of Bajia people in Manbi Village 曼必村, Menghun Town 勐混镇, Menghai County, Yunnan (comprising 48 households and 217 persons) has recently been classified by the Chinese government as ethnic Bulang people.
- Tai Beng 傣绷 – over 10,000 people in Yunnan Province, China. Also in Shan State, Myanmar. In China, they are in Meng'aba 勐阿坝, Mengma Town 勐马镇, Menglian County (in the three villages of Longhai 龙海, Yangpai 养派, and Guangsan 广伞); Mangjiao Village 芒角村, Shangyun Township 上允乡, Lancang County (in the 2 villages of Mangjing 芒京 and Mangna 芒那); Cangyuan County (in Mengjiao 勐角 and Mengdong 勐董 townships); Gengma County (in Mengding 勐定 and Mengsheng 勐省 townships); Ruili City (in small populations scattered along the border).
- Han Tai – 55,000 people in the Mengyuan County, Xishuangbanna Prefecture, Yunnan, China. Many Han Tai also speak Tai Lu (Shui Tai), the local lingua franca.
- Huayao Tai – 55,000 people (as of 1990) in Xinping and Mengyang Counties, Yunnan. It may be similar to Tai Lu.
- Lao Ga – 1,800 people mostly in Ban Tabluang, Ban Rai District, Uthai Thani Province, Thailand. Their language is reportedly similar to Lao Krang and Isan.
- Lao Krang – 50,000+ people in the provinces of Phichit, Suphan Buri, Uthai Thani, Chai Nat, Phitsanulok, Kamphaeng Phet, Nakhon Pathom and Nakhon Sawan, Thailand. Their language is similar to Isan and Lao. Tai Krang is not to be confused with Tai Khang, a Tai-speaking group of Laos numbering 5,000 people.
- Lao Lom – 25,000 people in Dan Sai District of Loei Province (locally known as the Lao Loei or Lao Lei), Lom Kao District of Phetchabun Province, and Tha Bo District of Nong Khai Province (locally known as the Tai Dan). The Lao Lom were first studied by Joachim Schliesinger in 2001. Unclassified Southwestern Tai language.
- Lao Ngaew – 20,000 to 30,000 people in Lop Buri Province (especially Ban Mi and Khok Samrong districts), the Tha Tako District of Nakhon Sawan Province and scattered parts of Singburi, Saraburi, Chaiyaphum, Phetchabun, Nong Khai and Loei provinces. Originally from eastern Xiengkhouang and western Huaphan provinces of Laos. Their language is similar to Isan.
- Lao Ti – 200 people in the 2 villages of Ban Goh and Nong Ban Gaim in Chom Bung District, Ratchaburi Province, Thailand. Originally from Vientiane in Laos. Their language is similar to Lao and Isan.
- Lao Wiang – 50,000+ people in Prachinburi, Udon Thani, Nakhon Sawan, Nakhon Pathom, Chai Nat, Lopburi, Saraburi, Phetchaburi and Roi Et. Originally from Wiang Chan (Vientiane) in Laos. Their language is similar to Lao.
- Paxi – 1,000+ people (as of 1990) in 2 villages 8 km from Menghai Town, at the foot of Jingwang Mountain in Xishuangbanna.
- Tai Bueng – 5,700 people in 2 villages of Phatthana Nikhom District, Lopburi Province, Thailand. The Tai Bueng live in the villages of Ban Klok Salung (pop. 5,000) and Ban Manao Hwan (pop. 600). Unclassified Tai language.
- Tai Doi ('mountain people') – 230 people (54 families) as of 1995 in Long District of Luang Namtha, Laos. Their language is likely Palaungic.
- Tai Gapong ('brainy Tai') – 3,200+ people; at least 2,000 people (500+ households) in Ban Varit, Waritchapum District, Sakhon Nakhon Province; also live with the Phutai and Yoy. The Tai Gapong claim to have originated in Borikhamxai Province, Laos.
- Tai He – 10,000 people in Borikhamxai Province, Laos: in Viangthong and Khamkeut Districts; also in Pakkading and Pakxan Districts. Unclassified Tai language.
- Tai Kaleun – 7,000 people mostly in Khamkeut District, Borikhamxai Province, Laos; also in Nakai District. 8,500 people in Thailand: the provinces of Mukdahan (Don Tan and Chanuman districts), Nakhon Phanom (Muang District) and parts of Sakhon Nakhon Province. The Tai Kaleung speak a Lao dialect.
- Tai Khang – 5,600+ people in Xam-Tai District, Houaphan Province, Laos; also in Nongkhet District of Xiangkhoang Province, and Viangthong District of Borikhamxai Province. Unclassified Tai language.
- Tai Kuan (Khouane) – 2,500 people in Viengthong District, Borikhamxai Province, Laos: near the banks of the Mouan River.
- Tai Laan – 450 people in a few villages of Kham District, Xiangkhoang Province, Laos. Unclassified Tai language.
- Tai Loi – 1,400 people in Namkham, Shan State, Burma; 500 people in Long District, Luang Namtha Province, Laos; possibly also in Xishuangbanna Prefecture, China, since some Tai Loi in Burma say they have relatives in China. Their language may be related to and probably also closely related to Palaung Pale.
- Tai Men – 8,000 people in Borikhamxai Province, Laos: mostly in Khamkeut District, but also in Vienthong, Pakkading, and Pakxan Districts. They speak a Northern Tai language.
- Tai Meuiy – 40,000+ people in Borikhamxai, Khammouan, Xiengkhouang, and Houaphan (just outside the town of Xam Neua) provinces of Laos. Their language is reportedly similar to Tai Dam and Tai Men.
- Tai Nyo – 13,000 people in Pakkading District, Borikhamxai Province, Laos; 50,000 people in northeastern Thailand, where they are better known as Nyaw. Similar to Lao of Luang Prabang.
- Tai Pao – 4,000 people in Viangthong, Khamkeut and Pakkading districts of Borikhamxai Province, Laos. They live near the Tai He and may be related to them. Unclassified Tai language.
- Tai Peung – 1,000 people in Kham District, Xiengkhouang Province, Laos. They live near the Tai Laan and Tai Sam. Unclassified Tai language.
- Tai Pong 傣棚 – perhaps as many as 100,000 people in along the Honghe River of southeastern, Yunnan, China, and possibly also in northern Vietnam. Subgroups include the Tai La, Tai You, and probably also Tai Ya (which includes Tai Ka and Tai Sai). Unclassified Tai language.
- Tai Sam – 700 people in Kham District, Xiengkhuoang Province, Laos. Neighboring peoples include the Tai Peung and Tai Laan. Unclassified Tai language.
- Tai Song – 45,000+ people in Phetchabun, Phitsanulok, Nakhon Sawan (Tha Tako District), Ratchaburi (Chom Bung District), Suphan Buri (Song Phinong District), Kanchanaburi, Chumphon and Nakhon, and Pathom (Muang District). Also called Lao Song. They are a subgroup of the Tai Dam.
- Tai Wang – 10,000 people in several villages in Viraburi District, Savannakhet Province, Laos; 8,000 in and around the city of Phanna Nikhom, Sakhon Nakhon Province, Thailand. Their language is related to but distinct from Phutai.
- Tai Yuan – 6,000,000 people in Northern Thailand and possibly 10,000 people in Houayxay and Pha-Oudom districts of Bokeo Province, Luang Namtha District of Luang Namhta Province, Xai District of Oudomxai Province, and Xaignabouri District of Xaignabouri Province. They speak a Southwestern Tai language.
- Tak Bai Thai – 24,000 people in southern Thailand (in Narathiwat, Pattani, and Yala provinces) and northern Malaysia. Their name comes from the town of Tak Bai in Narathiwat Province. Their language is highly different from nearby Southern Thai dialects, and may be related to the Sukkothai dialect further up north.
- Yang – 5,000 people in Phongsaly, Luang Namtha, and Oudomxay provinces, Laos (Chazee 1998).
- Kap Kè ('gekko' people) now refer to themselves as Nyo. The Nyo proper reside mostly along the Mekong between Hinboun and Pakxanh and also in Thailand. The Kap Kè claim they are the same as the Nyo of Ban Khammouane in Khamkeut District, Bolikhamsai province, Laos. Another Kap Kè group of about 40 households originally from Sop Khom has now resettled in Sop Phouan. This group claims to be from Ban Faan, about 1 kilometer from Sop Khom.
- Phuk (sometimes pronounced without the final –k as Phu') – According to themselves as well as other ethnic groups, the Phuk closely resemble the Kap Kè and originally came from nearby locations, referred to as phiang phuk and phiang Kap Kè. They were originally from the villages of Fane, Ka'an and Vong Khong.
- Thay Bo – located on the Nakai plateau in central Laos, along the middle Hinboun River, east of the Kong Lo cave and the Phon Tiou tin mine, and in Ban Na Hat and near Na Pè, close to the Vietnamese border. Bo means 'a mine,' referring people who worked either in the salt mines on the Nakai Plateau, or at the tin mine. Many older generation people speak a Vietic language as well, apparently Maleng, as spoken in the village of Song Khone on the Nam Sot River, a main tributary of the Nam Theun, although this has not been verified.
- Kha Bo – In 1996, the Bo of Sop Ma village reported that they were "born from the Kha," a reference to their Vietic origins, and in that village there was intermarriage with the Maleng of Song Khone. They are distinct from the Thay Bo of Hinboun. The Kha Bo on the Nakai plateau speak Nyo, whereas nowadays the Thay Bo of Hinboun speak Lao or Kaleung. The Ahoe, original inhabitants of the northwestern part of the Nakai Plateau, had also been relocated to Hinboun during the Second War of Indochina, and returned to their homeland speaking Hinboun Nyo as a second language.

In Burma, there are also various Tai peoples that are often categorized as part of a larger Shan ethnicity (see Shan people#Tai groups).

== See also ==
- Dong people
- Rau people
