= Laha language =

Kra language spoken in Vietnam

Laha
- Region: Vietnam
- Ethnicity: 8,200 Laha (2009 census)
- Native speakers: (5,700 cited 1999 census)
- Language family: Kra–Dai: Kra; Laha

Language codes
- ISO 639-3: lha
- Glottolog: laha1250
- ELP: Laha (Vietnam)

Laha (Chinese: 拉哈; Vietnamese: La Ha) is a Kra language spoken by approximately 1,400 people out of a total population of 5,686 Laha. It is spoken in Lào Cai and Sơn La provinces, Vietnam. Laha dialects had been documented in 1986 by Russian linguists and in 1996 by American linguist Jerold A. Edmondson. Many Laha can also converse in the Khmu language, and Laha-speaking areas also have significant Black Thai (Tai Dam), Kháng, Ksongmul (Ksingmul, Xinh-mun), and Hmong populations.

Ostapirat (2000) considers the Laha dialects to form a subgroup of their own (Southern Kra) within the Kra branch.

== Geographic distribution ==
Gregerson & Edmondson (1997) and Wardlaw (2000) report the following locations of two Laha dialects, namely the Wet Laha and Dry Laha dialects.

Wet Laha (Laha Ung, la33 ha21 ʔuŋ31) of Lào Cai and Lai Châu

- Tà Mít Commune, Tân Uyên, Lai Châu, Vietnam (just north of the Black River) — known as the "Wet Laha". Edmondson's informant is from Bản Muot Village, Tà Mít Commune (Edmondson & Gregerson 1997). There are 8 Laha villages numbering no more than 1,000 people in Than Uyên District, Lai Châu, Vietnam.
- Pha Mu and Nặm Cần Communes, Tân Uyên, Lai Châu

Dry Laha (Laha Phlao) of Sơn La — around the Sông Đà and Nậm Mu Rivers

- Noong Lay and Nặm Ét Communes, Thuận Châu, Sơn La, Vietnam (just south of the Black River; in Bản Muot, etc.) — known as the "Dry Laha"
- Chiền Xòm, Liềp Tè, Noong Giông, and Nặm Ét in Sơn La
- Nặm Giôn, Chiền Xàng, Chiền Dong, Pi Toong, and Mường Bú of Mường La District, Sơn La Province. Laha of Nà Tạy, Pi Toong commune is documented in Hsiu (2017).
- Thuận Châu, Mường La, Quỳnh Nhai districts of Sơn La Province
- Bản Bung and Phù Yên near Sơn La Province on the north bank of the Black River

== Phonology ==
=== Consonants ===
Tà Mit Laha consonants
		Labial	Alveolar	Palato- alveolar	(Alveolo-) palatal	Velar	Glottal
Stop/ Affricate	voiceless	p	t	tʃ		k	ʔ
Stop/ Affricate	aspirated	pʰ	tʰ			kʰ	
Stop/ Affricate	voiced	b	d				
Fricative		f	s		ʑ	x	h
Nasal		m	n		ɲ	ŋ	
Approximant		w	l				

Noong Lay Laha consonants
		Labial	Alveolar	Palato- alveolar	(Alveolo-) palatal	Velar	Glottal
Stop/ Affricate	voiceless	p	t	tʃ		k	ʔ
Stop/ Affricate	aspirated	pʰ	tʰ			kʰ	
Stop/ Affricate	voiced	b	d	dʒ			
Fricative			s		ʑ	x	h
Nasal		m	n		ɲ	ŋ	
Approximant		w	l				

- In both dialects, /tʃ/ can be heard as [tɕ] when occurring before front vowels.

==== Final consonants ====
Both have the same final consonants, except /l/ is only in the Noong Lay dialect.

Tà Mit final consonants
	Labial	Alveolar	Velar	Glottal
Stop	p	t	k	ʔ
Nasal	m	n	ŋ	

Noong Lay final consonants
	Labial	Alveolar	Velar	Glottal
Stop	p	t	k	ʔ
Nasal	m	n	ŋ	
Approximant		l		

=== Vowels ===
	Front	Central	Back	
Close	i		ɯ	u
Near-close	ɪ			
Close-mid	e	ə	o	
Open-mid	ɛ	ɐ	ɔ	
Open		a		

- Vowel sounds /ɛ, a, ɔ/ can occur long as /ɛː, aː, ɔː/.

Final vowels
	Front	Back
Close	i	u

Both dialects have two vowels /i, u/ in final position. They also may be heard as glide sounds [j, w].

== See also ==
- Laha people
