= Lao Ga =

Tai sub-ethnic group of Lao people

Total population
- 1,900

Regions with significant populations
- Thailand

Languages
- Lao, Thai

Religion
- Theravada Buddhism

Related ethnic groups
- Other Tai peoples, especially Lao and Thai.

The Lao Ga (Thai: ลาวกา, RTGS: Lao Ka, pronounced [lāːw kāː]), are a Tai sub-ethnic group of Lao people.

== Location ==
The Lao Ga are only found in Ban Thap Luang (บ้านทัพหลวง), Ban Rai District, Uthai Thani Province. The Lao Ga speak a dialect of the Lao language, and number around 1,900.

== Alternate names ==
They are also known as Lao Gao (Thai: ลาวเกา) or just plain Ga referencing the creaky, crow-like way of speaking peculiar to their dialect of Lao. Gao literally means scratchy, another attribute of the way Lao Ga speakers come across. Naturally, these terms are offensive.

== History ==
Like many Isan people and more specifically, other ethnic Lao groups of Central Thailand, the Lao Ga are descendants of slaves and forced corvée labourers brought after the Siamese conquest of the successor kingdoms of Lanxang, mostly from the region of Vientiane. This makes them historically related to the Lao Wiang. Although many Lao groups assimilated into the greater Thai population (unlike in Isan where their large numbers and close contact with other Lao peoples in Laos prevented complete Thaification), the Lao Ga were able to maintain their Lao language and traditions.

== Culture ==
The Lao Ga practise Therevada Buddhism with various amounts of animism and ancestor veneration. Their culture is very similar to the Lao people from which they descend.
