= Quỳnh Nhai =

- Commune
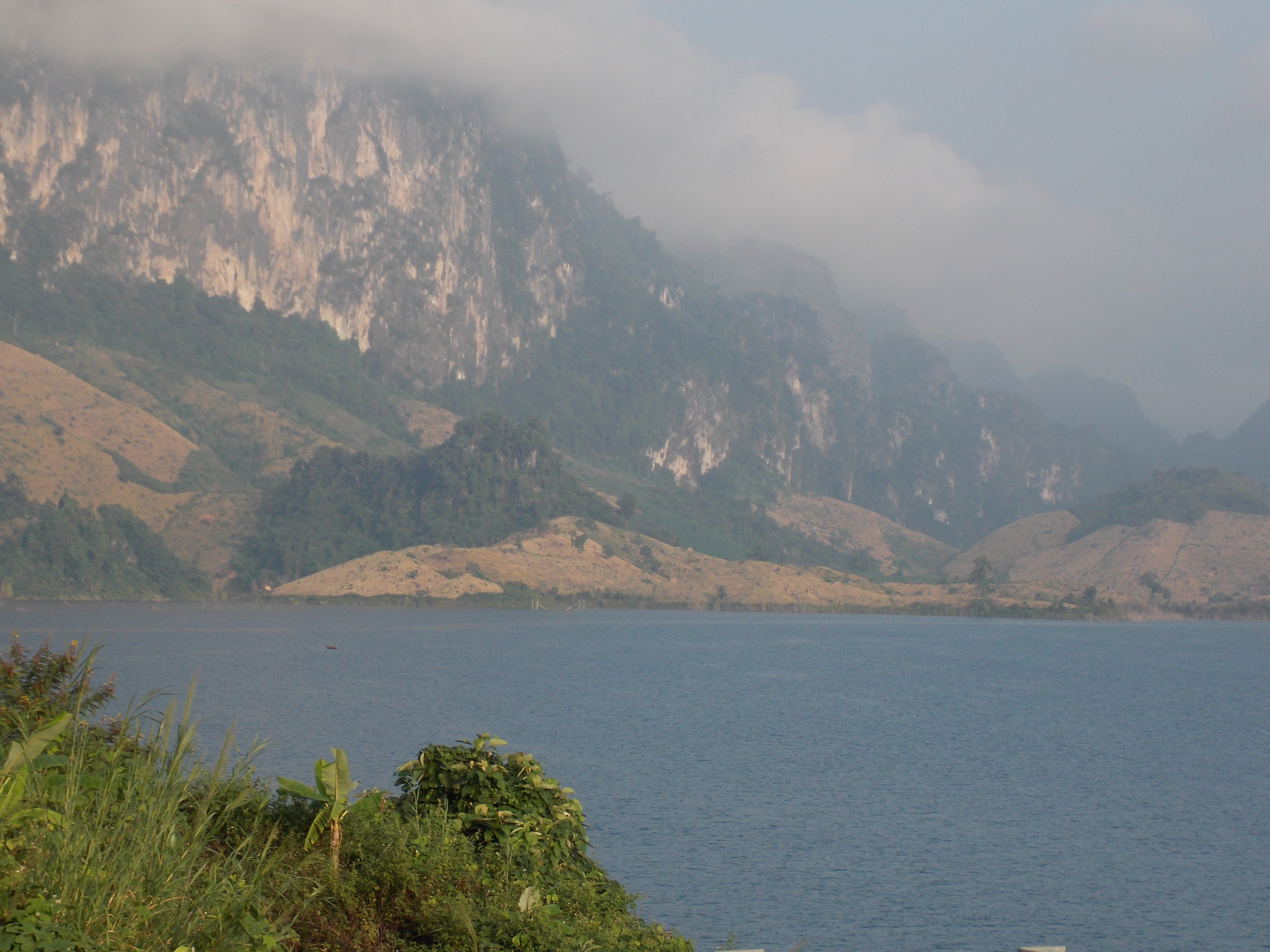
- A view of Quỳnh Nhai commune
- Interactive map of Quỳnh Nhai
- Coordinates: 21.65823002870831°N 103.62255414700827°E
- Country: Vietnam
- Province: Sơn La
- Region: Northwest
- Established: 16 June 2025

Area
  - Total: 244.31 km^{2} (94.33 sq mi)

Population (2024)
  - Total: 30,554
  - Density: 125/km^{2} (320/sq mi)
- Website: quynhnhai.sonla.gov.vn

Quỳnh Nhai is a commune in Sơn La province, Vietnam.

== History ==
On 14 November 2024, the Standing Committee of the National Assembly of Vietnam adopted Resolution No. 1280/NQ-UBTVQH15 on the reorganization of district- and commune-level administrative units in Sơn La province for the 2023–2025 period. The resolution, which took effect on 1 February 2025, established Mường Giàng township in Quỳnh Nhai district from the entire 67.97 km² natural area and population of 11,832 of Mường Giàng commune.

On 16 June 2025:

- The National Assembly of Vietnam adopted Resolution No. 203/2025/QH15 amending and supplementing several articles of the Constitution of the Socialist Republic of Vietnam. The resolution provided for the cessation of district-level administrative units nationwide from 1 July 2025.
- The Standing Committee of the National Assembly of Vietnam adopted Resolution No. 1681/NQ-UBTVQH15 on the reorganization of commune-level administrative units in Sơn La province in 2025. Under the resolution, the entire natural area and population of Mường Giàng township and Chiềng Bằng, Chiềng Khoang, and Chiềng Ơn communes in Quỳnh Nhai district were consolidated to form a new commune named Quỳnh Nhai.
