= Tai Bueng =

Total population
- 6,000

Regions with significant populations
- Thailand

Languages
- Thai

Religion
- Theravada Buddhism

Related ethnic groups
- Lao, Thai, other Tai groups.

The Tai Bueng (Thai: ไทเบิ้ง, pronounced [tʰāj bɤ̂ːŋ]) are an ethnic group in Thailand. They are also referred to as Lao Bueng (Thai: ลาวเบิ้ง, pronounced [lāːw bɤ̂ːŋ]).

== Geographic distribution ==
The Tai Bueng reside in two villages of Amphoe Phatthana Nikhom (อำเภอพัฒนานิคม) in Lopburi Province.

== Culture ==
The Tai Bueng have maintained their unique culture despite being located in the heart of Thailand and in spite of onerous Thaification policies. Their distinctive dress consists of chong kaben (a type of pantaloon) with a silver belt. In other ways, they are very similar to surrounding Thai people and the Lao from which they descend. The Tai Bueng language and culture has been comparatively little studied.

== History ==
The Tai Bueng believe they are descendants of ethnic Lao from the Lao city of Mueang Uthen (เมืองอุเทน), now located in Nakhon Phanom Province along the Mekong River and modern-day Lao border. Although the details of their arrival in central Thailand is a mystery, it is possible that like other Lao-speaking tribal Tai groups, the Tai Bueng were enslaved or forced into corvée labour and forcibly moved to where they are now.

== Religion ==
The Tai Bueng practise Therevada Buddhism.
