= History of the Tai-Phake people in northeast India =

The people of Tai-Phake entreated Assam located in Northeastern India, establishing their kingdom by the end of the 18th century.

The word Phake is derived from the Tai words 'Pa' meaning wall and 'ke/ge' meaning ancient or old.

== Journey to establishment ==
The Tai-Phake people aimed to expand their kingdom to attain national recognition and for the betterment of their people's livelihood. The heads of the village conducted a series of movements and procedures across India to aid the expansion and recognition of the kingdom. The eldest prince Chow Seukapha proceeded towards the west, the second prince Chow Seukhanpha — east and Chow Seuchatpha — north from Yunnan, along with their selected group of followers. The three princes consulted they're almanacs and embarked in three different directions. To ensure safety, the army followed them. The youngest prince Chow Seuchatpha assumed leadership and established his reign in the kingdom of Yunnan.

To ensure the welfare of his people, the proliferation of his race and propagation of his supremacy, Chow Seukapha traversed the Patkai Hills and came down to Moung-Noon-Chun-Kham or the Kingdom of Assam in 1228 AD and established the Tai-Ahom kingdom in Assam.

== Tai-Phakes with Chow Seukhanpha ==
The Tai-Phakes joined as contingent to the group, who wished to establish a kingdom under the leadership of the second prince Chow Seukhanpha. Seukhanpha had moved ahead with his soldiers and people in the northern direction from Yunnan and established his kingdom in Moung-Kwang (Mogawng) situated in present-day Burma (Myanmar). The king ordered the people to settle on their own and start their livelihood in a Hukawng Valley in 1215 AD in consensus to the king's order.

Three rivers ran through the Hukawng valley: Khe-Nan-Turung, Khe-Nan-Taram and Khe-Nan-Chalip. They united into a single body of water near a stone wall, forming a gorge to a river since antiquity. The Tai people inhabiting within the vicinity called this wall as Pha-Ke. Pha-Ke means the wall of an old hill or the Tai people inhabiting near the side of the mountain. The Hukawng valley, inhabited by the Phakes, was then bounded in the east by the Lang-Ta hills near the principality of the Tai-Khamptis. To the west were the Pungyi-Punga hills. The Patkai hills bounded the northern limits, on the other side of which stretched the Assam, to its south were the Jampu hills.

== Annexation of the Hukawng Valley ==
The Tai-Phakes resided in the Hukawng valley for more than 400 years. After that, the entire Hukawng valley came under the supremacy of the king of Burma. The oppressive anarchical administration and tyranny of the Burmese king made the Tai-Phakes anxious. It was at about this time that the Phakes came in contact with the Singpho people during the year 1247 AD. While they were residing on the foothills of the Jampu hills, some among the Phakes and Singpho people began to salvage themselves from the oppression of the king. They united to mutually help each other and for that, they slaughtered a buffalo and had a special feast.

Both the Phakes and the Singphos passed this critical period. According to a written agreement, they resolved to establish a kingdom away from the rule of the Burmese king. The Phakes and the Singphos discussed and unanimously dawned on the decision to abandon their erstwhile home in Hukawng and immediately embarked on their quest to establish an independent kingdom.

== Migration To India ==
In 1775 AD the Tai-Phake people travelled towards the valley of Assam, travelling the same route taken by King Seukapha. The Singphos and the Phakes traversed Patkai and came to rest in a place bordering Assam and Burma. They called this place Pang-Sao. "Pang" means place and "Sao" means rest.

Learning of the Tai-Phake people's movement, the king forced them to retreat. In response to this, the Tai-Phake people abandoned Pang-Sao and resumed their journey towards the Assam. During the journey, the Tai-Phake people came to the bank of a pond filled with moss, situated in the state of Arunachal Pradesh. They made the pond their center and called it Nong-Taw. Towards the end of 1775 AD the Phakes and the Singphos settled and started a stable society here for a few years. During this time, the Phakes also came into close contact with the Khamptis. When the king Sadiya Khowa heard about the settlement of the Phakes and the Singphos at Nong-Taw, he dispatched an army to destroy them, which resulted in a coup against him in 1797 AD.
