= Tân Uyên, Ho Chi Minh City =

Tân Uyên Phường Tân Uyên Uyên Hưng
- Ward
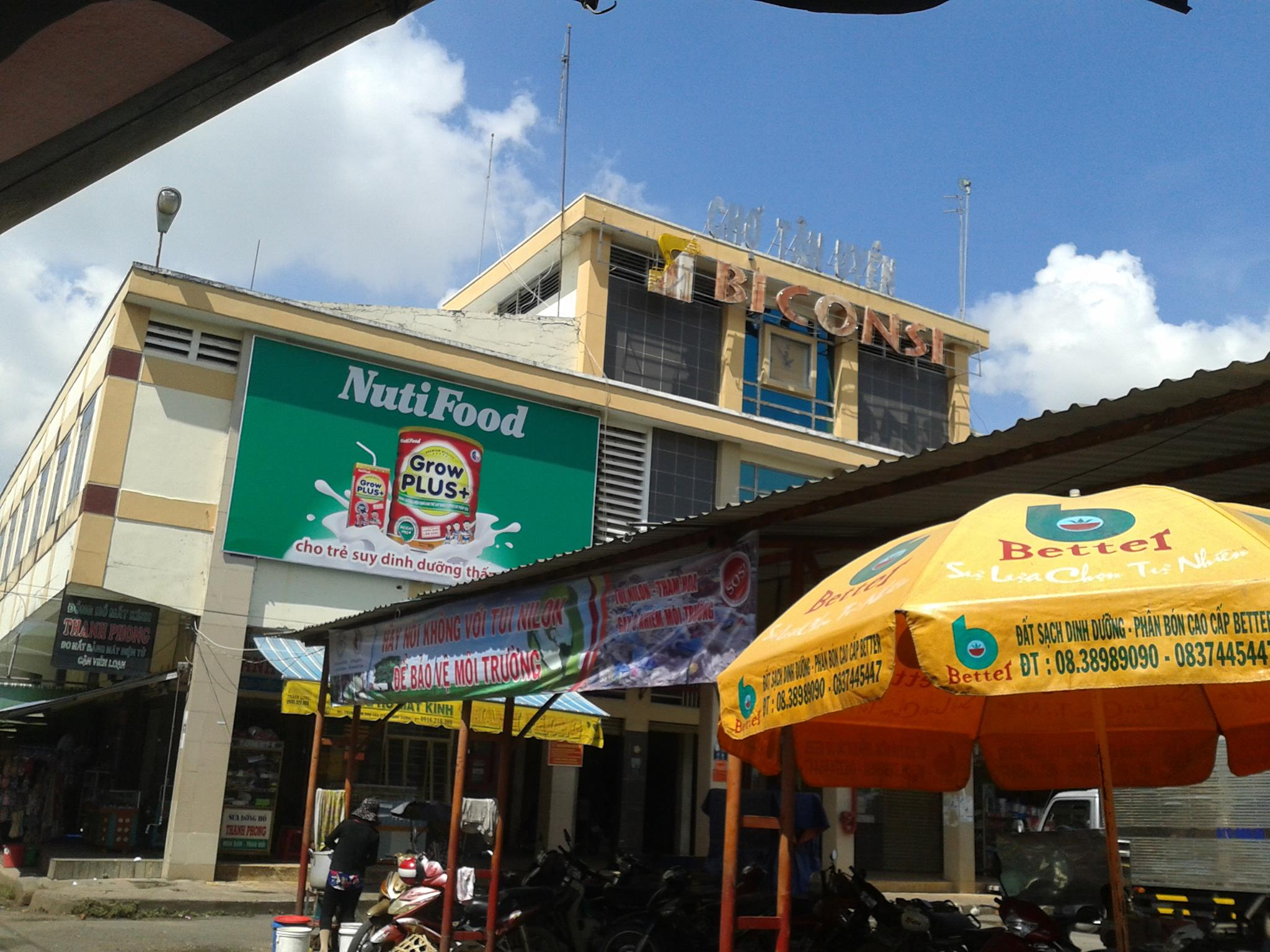
- Tân Uyên Market
- Interactive map of Tân Uyên
- Coordinates: 11°3′39″N 106°47′55″E
- Country: Vietnam
- Municipality: Ho Chi Minh City
- Established: June 16, 2025

Area
  - Total: 36.55 sq mi (94.67 km^{2})

Population (2024)
  - Total: 73,032
  - Density: 1,998/sq mi (771.4/km^{2})
- Time zone: UTC+07:00 (Indochina Time)
- Administrative code: 25888

Tân Uyên (Vietnamese: Phường Tân Uyên) is a ward of Ho Chi Minh City, Vietnam. It is one of the 168 new wards, communes and special zones of the city following the reorganization in 2025.

== History ==
On June 16, 2025, the National Assembly Standing Committee issued Resolution No. 1685/NQ-UBTVQH15 on the arrangement of commune-level administrative units of Ho Chi Minh City in 2025 (effective from June 16, 2025). Accordingly, the entire land area and population of Uyên Hưng ward and Bạch Đằng commune of the former Tân Uyên city, Tân Lập commune and part of Tân Mỹ commune of the former Bắc Tân Uyên district will be integrated into a new ward named Tân Uyên (Clause 99, Article 1).
