= Lao Wiang =

Total population
- 52,300

Regions with significant populations
- Thailand

Languages
- Lao, Thai

Religion
- Theravada Buddhism

The Lao Wiang (Thai: ลาวเวียง, pronounced [lāːw wīaŋ]), sometimes also referred to as Lao Wieng, are a Tai sub-ethnic group of the Isan region. Approximately 50,000 self-identified Lao Wiang live in villages throughout Thailand, especially in the provinces of Prachinburi, Udon Thani, Nakhon Pathom, Chai Nat, Lopburi, Saraburi, Nakhon Nayok, Suphan Buri, Ratchaburi, Phetchaburi, and Roi Et with a significant number residing in Bangkok.

== Alternate names ==
The Lao Wiang are also referred to as Tai Wiang (ไทเวียง), Lao Vientiane (ลาวเวียงจันทน์), Tai Vientiane (ไทเวียงจันทน์) or simply as Wiang (เวียง). These names are also used in Laos to refer to the inhabitants of Vientiane or their descendants in Thailand. Many who are in fact, Lao Wiang may identify simply as Isan or Lao.

== History ==
The Lao Wiang, as their name suggests, are descendants of Lao people from the Vientiane (Wiang Chan) region (Thai: เวียงจันทน์) in modern-day Laos. After the fall of Lan Xang, the three successor kingdoms were overrun by Siam and forced population transfers into Isan were carried out by the Siamese. Much of Isan was settled in this way and this is one of the main reasons for the shared Lao culture of Laos and Isan. Originally enslaved and forced to provide corvée labour, the Lao Wiang were freed and integrated into the general Isan population.

== Culture ==
The Lao Wiang are a sub-group of the broader Isan population(ethnic Lao of northeastern Thailand) distinguished from other Isan people by the origin of their ancestors. While most have adopted either a Thai or Isan identity, but some continue to maintain their distinctiveness. Like their neighbours, they share Theravada Buddhism, Isan language, and rice farming, with only slight differences in traditional clothing and dialect.
