= Laha people =

La Ha
Total population
- Vietnam 10,157 (2019)

Regions with significant populations
- Vietnam: Yên Bái, Sơn La

Languages
- La Ha • Vietnamese

Religion
- Animism • Buddhism

The La Ha (Vietnamese: người La Ha) are an ethnic group of Vietnam. Most La Ha live in the Yên Bái and Sơn La provinces, and numbered 10,157 people in 2019. They speak the Laha language, which is part of the Tai–Kadai language family.

The La Ha celebrate the Pang A Nụn Ban Festival to show deep gratitude to their doctors. They offer them bitter bamboo and Mạ Rệ flower, both of which are popular drugs.

== History ==
According to the Black Tai Chronicle, the Black Tai (Tai Dam people) had gained control of Muang Mouay in the Red River valley from the Laha people via deceit and murder. After fighting the Laha chief Am Poi (also named Khoun Piên) for a long time, the Black Tai leader Lang Cheuang asked to marry the Laha chief's daughter Hao, and went to the wedding feast. However, the Laha chief brought fifty bodyguards with him as he distrusted the Black Tai. The Laha bodyguards were persuaded to put down their weapons, and Am Poi became drunk at the feast. The Laha chief was then killed, and the other Laha escaped as the Black Tai took over the Red River valley.
