= Quỳnh Nhai district =

Coordinates: 21.833°N 103.667°E

Quỳnh Nhai district Huyện Quỳnh Nhai
- District
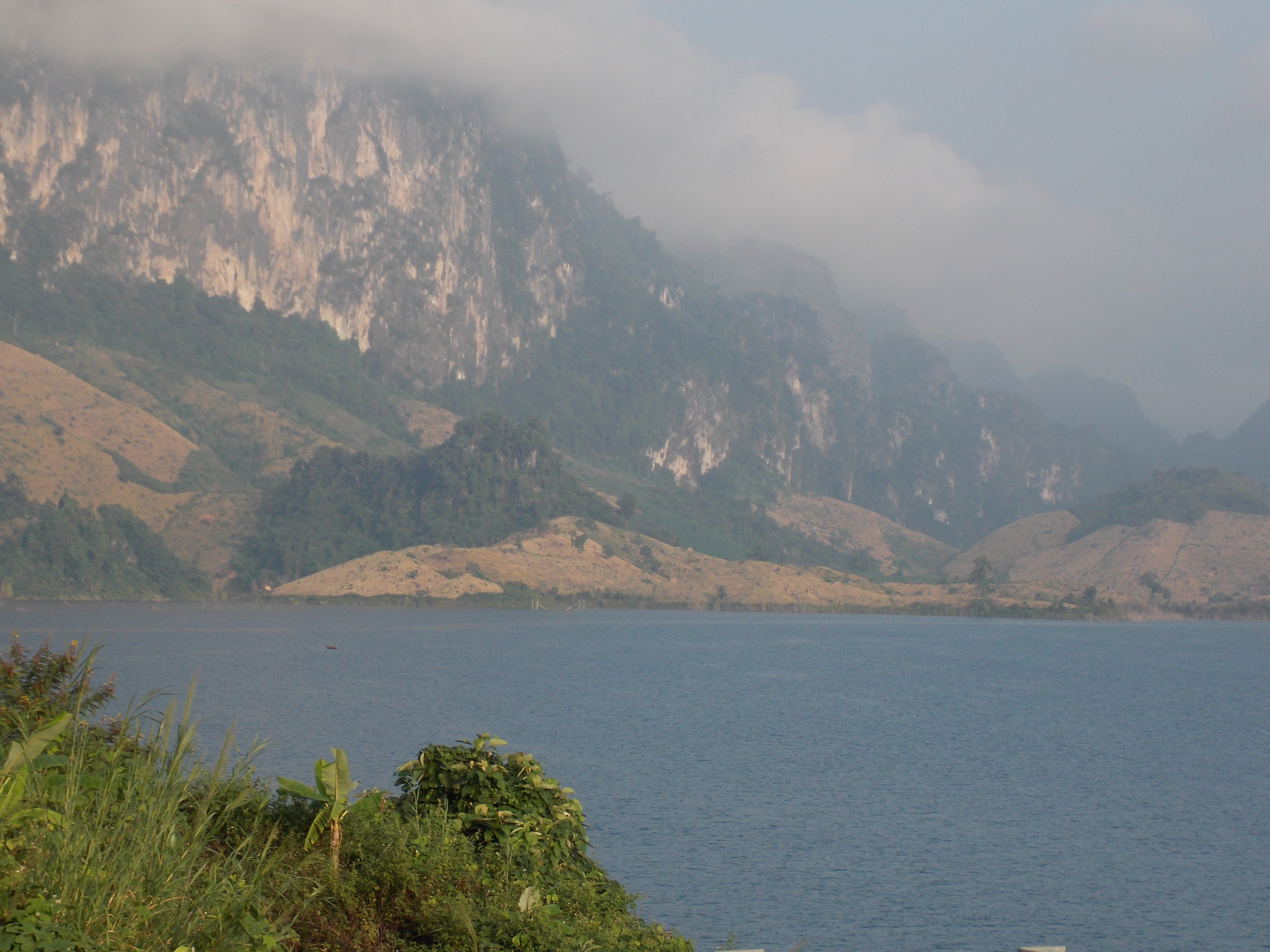
- View between Chiềng Ơn mountain and lake

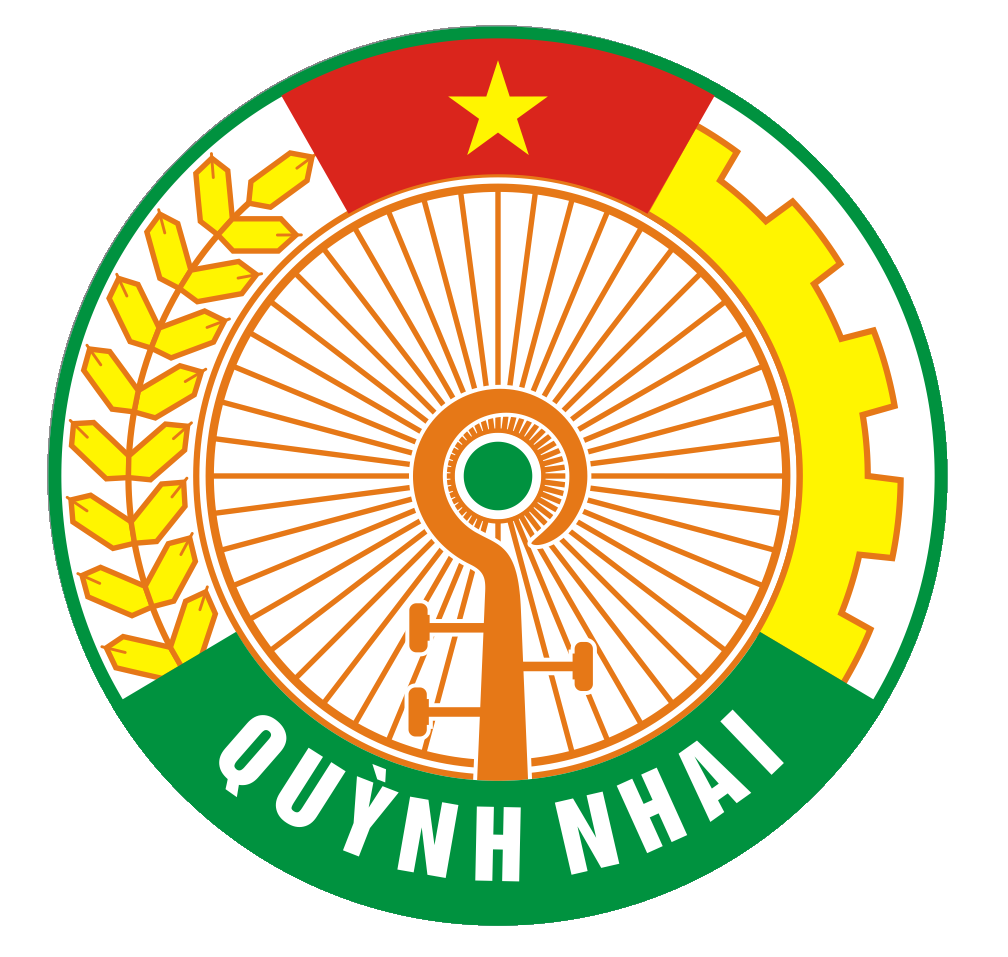
- Seal
- Interactive map of Quỳnh Nhai district
- Country: Vietnam
- Region: Northwest
- Province: Sơn La province
- Capital: Quỳnh Nhai

Area
  - Total: 405 sq mi (1,049 km^{2})

Population (2003)
  - Total: 62,189
- Time zone: UTC+7 (UTC + 7)

Quỳnh Nhai is a former district (huyện) of Sơn La province in the Northwest region of Vietnam.

As of 2003 the district had a population of 62,189. The district covers an area of 1,049 km^{2}. The district capital lies at Quỳnh Nhai.

== Climate ==
Climate data for Quỳnh Nhai
Month	Jan	Feb	Mar	Apr	May	Jun	Jul	Aug	Sep	Oct	Nov	Dec	Year
Record high °C (°F)	34.1 (93.4)	38.0 (100.4)	40.1 (104.2)	40.5 (104.9)	41.0 (105.8)	38.7 (101.7)	38.3 (100.9)	39.0 (102.2)	37.8 (100.0)	36.5 (97.7)	34.8 (94.6)	37.6 (99.7)	41.0 (105.8)
Mean daily maximum °C (°F)	22.8 (73.0)	25.3 (77.5)	28.6 (83.5)	31.6 (88.9)	32.9 (91.2)	32.3 (90.1)	32.0 (89.6)	32.3 (90.1)	32.0 (89.6)	30.1 (86.2)	26.8 (80.2)	23.8 (74.8)	29.2 (84.6)
Daily mean °C (°F)	16.8 (62.2)	18.6 (65.5)	21.8 (71.2)	24.9 (76.8)	26.8 (80.2)	27.3 (81.1)	27.2 (81.0)	27.1 (80.8)	26.3 (79.3)	24.1 (75.4)	20.6 (69.1)	17.3 (63.1)	23.2 (73.8)
Mean daily minimum °C (°F)	13.6 (56.5)	14.9 (58.8)	17.6 (63.7)	20.9 (69.6)	23.1 (73.6)	24.4 (75.9)	24.5 (76.1)	24.3 (75.7)	23.3 (73.9)	21.0 (69.8)	17.5 (63.5)	14.0 (57.2)	19.9 (67.8)
Record low °C (°F)	0.9 (33.6)	5.4 (41.7)	6.5 (43.7)	12.8 (55.0)	16.6 (61.9)	18.6 (65.5)	20.9 (69.6)	20.6 (69.1)	16.3 (61.3)	11.8 (53.2)	7.4 (45.3)	3.5 (38.3)	0.9 (33.6)
Average rainfall mm (inches)	30.7 (1.21)	28.4 (1.12)	58.8 (2.31)	133.8 (5.27)	205.6 (8.09)	291.7 (11.48)	356.1 (14.02)	314.2 (12.37)	153.0 (6.02)	75.7 (2.98)	42.6 (1.68)	25.0 (0.98)	1,717.1 (67.60)
Average rainy days	4.4	4.1	6.6	12.2	15.6	19.4	20.8	18.9	11.7	7.8	5.1	3.1	129.7
Average relative humidity (%)	83.2	80.0	79.1	80.0	82.0	85.6	87.0	86.7	86.1	85.4	84.7	83.9	83.6
Mean monthly sunshine hours	107.6	117.6	114.3	176.6	186.1	128.1	132.8	155.6	163.8	153.5	130.3	126.0	1,720.5
Source: Vietnam Institute for Building Science and Technology
