= Tân Uyên district =

Tân Uyên district Huyện Tân Uyên
- District
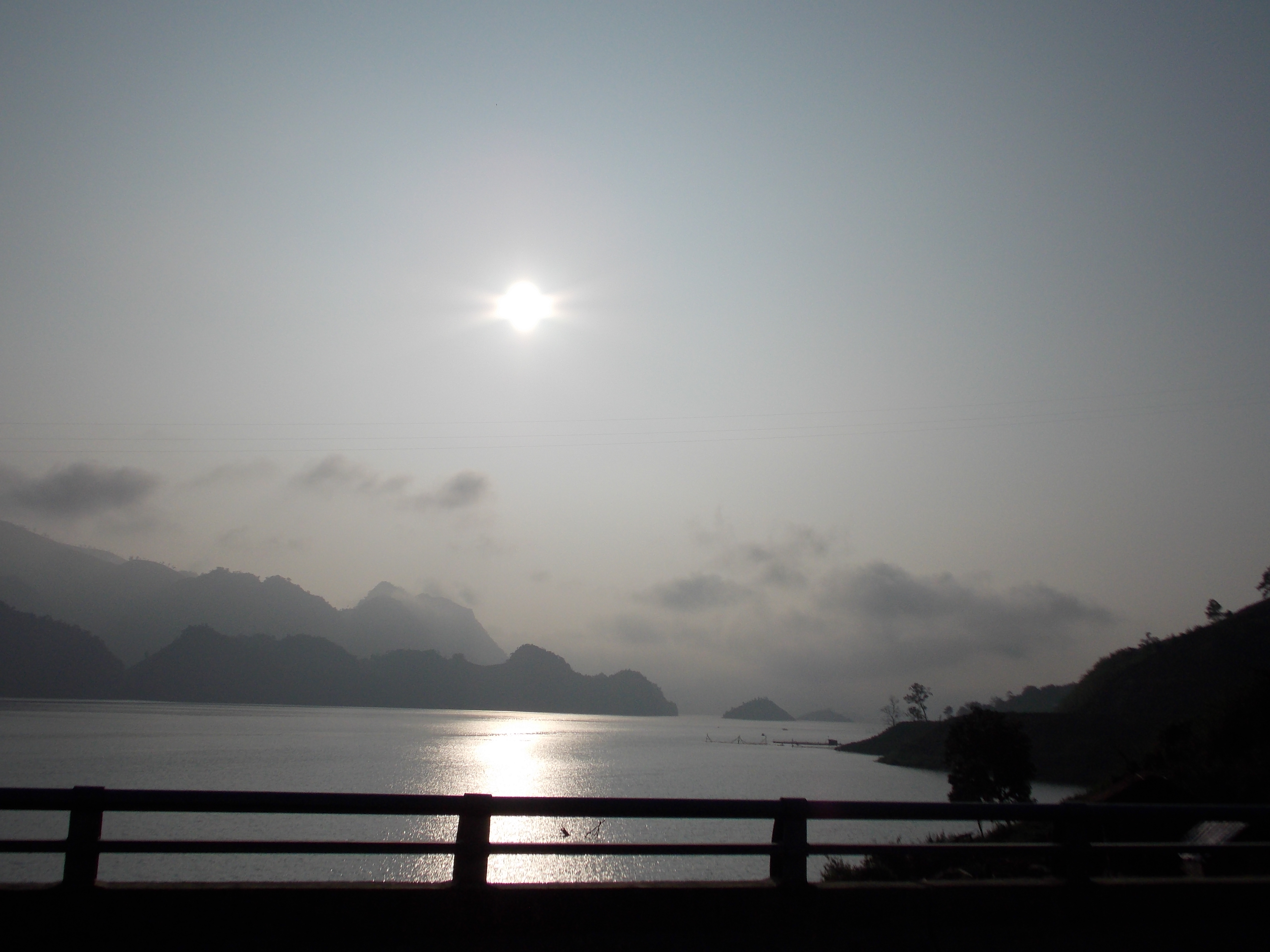
- River in Nậm Cần
- Interactive map of Tân Uyên district
- Country: Vietnam
- Region: Northwest
- Province: Lai Châu
- Capital: Tân Uyên

Area
  - Total: 348.754 sq mi (903.268 km^{2})

Population (2019 census)
  - Total: 58,104
  - Density: 166.60/sq mi (64.326/km^{2})
- Time zone: UTC+7 (Indochina Time)

Tân Uyên is a former rural district of Lai Châu province in the Northwest region of Vietnam. It was established in 2008. Its area come from the southern half of Than Uyên district. As of 2019, the district had a population of 58,104. The district covers an area of 903.27 km^{2}. The district capital lies at Tân Uyên.

== Communes ==
Not including the capital, Tân Uyên district has 9 communes:

- Mường Khoa
- Phúc Khoa
- Nậm Sỏ
- Nậm Cần
- Thân Thuộc
- Trung Đồng
- Hố Mít
- Pắc Ta
- Tà Mít
