= Than Uyên district =

Coordinates: 22.000°N 103.833°E

Than Uyên District Huyện Than Uyên
- District
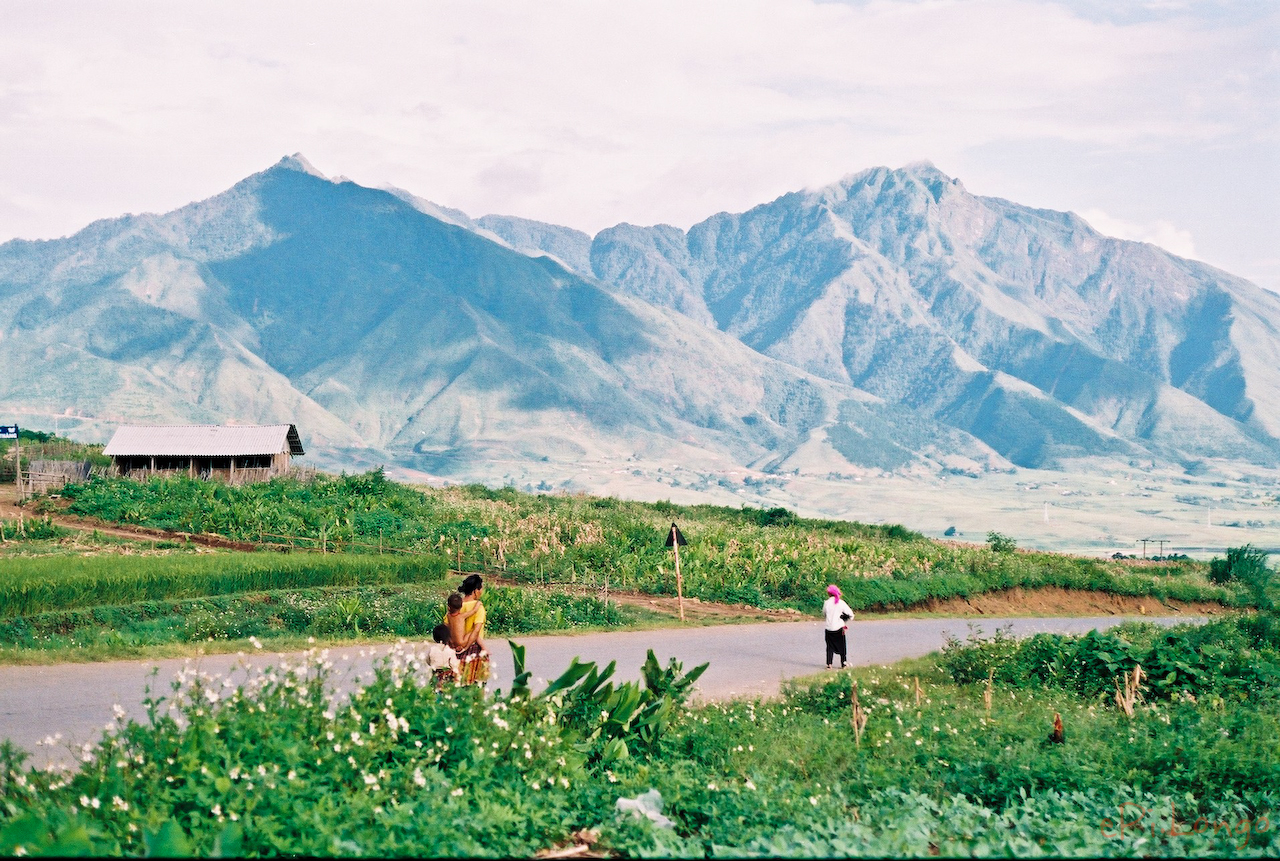

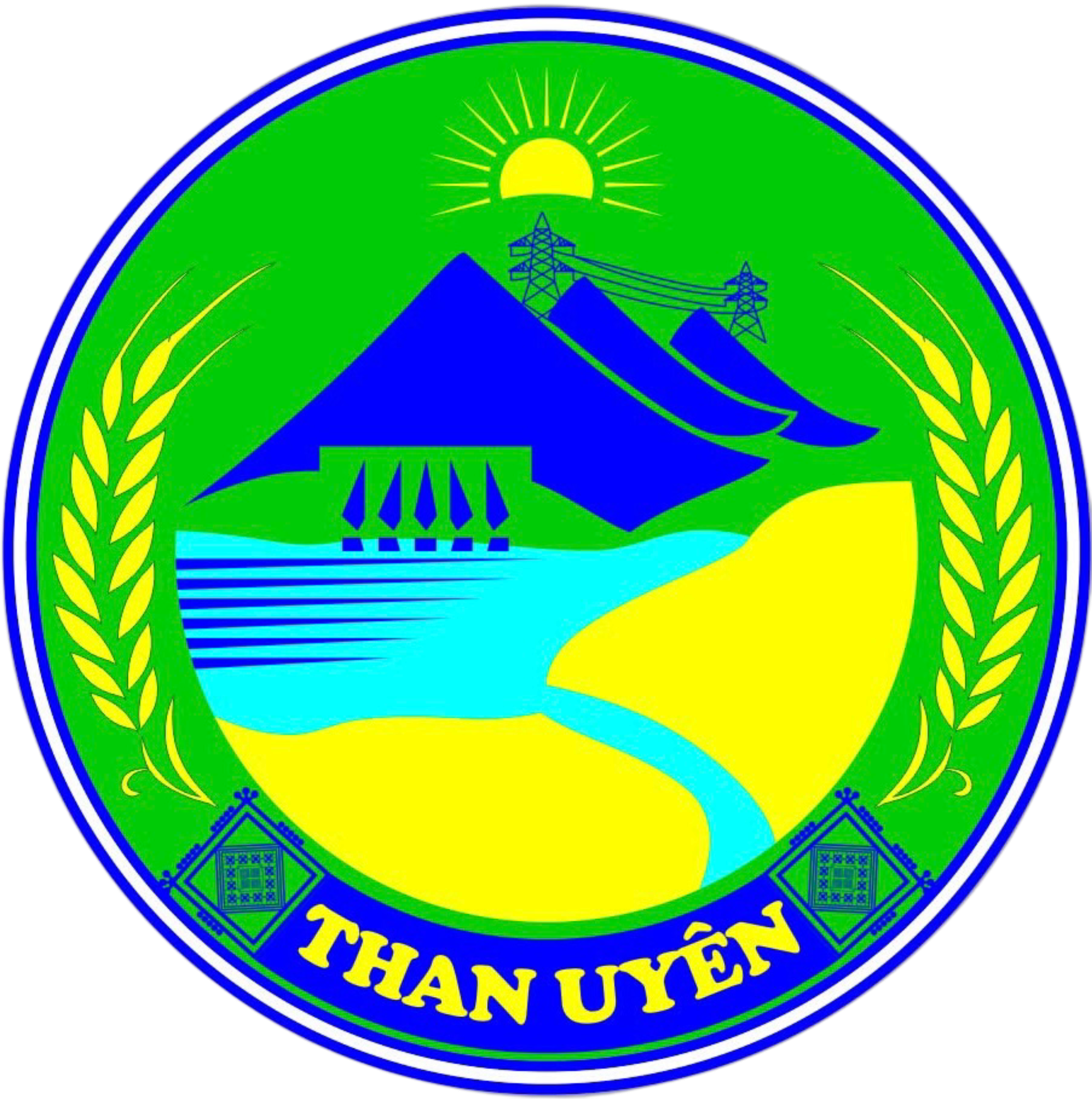
- Seal

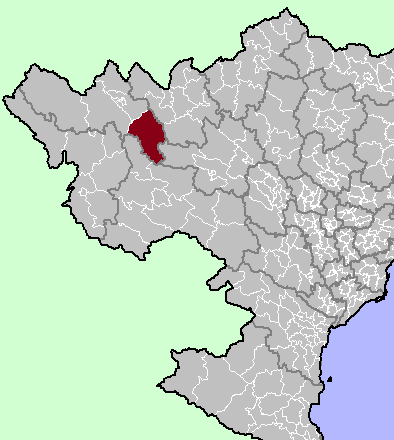
- District location in northern Vietnam
- Country: Vietnam
- Region: Northwest
- Province: Lai Châu
- Capital: Than Uyên

Area
  - District: 306.00 sq mi (792.53 km^{2})

Population (2019 census)
  - District: 67,550
  - Density: 220.8/sq mi (85.23/km^{2})
  - Urban: 7,175
  - Rural: 60,375
- Time zone: UTC+7 (Indochina Time)

Than Uyên is a former rural district of Lai Châu province in the Northwest region of Vietnam. As of 2019, the district had a population of 67,550. The district covers an area of 1,630 km^{2}. The district capital lies at Than Uyên.

== Climate ==
Climate data for Than Uyên, elevation 556 m (1,824 ft)
Month	Jan	Feb	Mar	Apr	May	Jun	Jul	Aug	Sep	Oct	Nov	Dec	Year
Record high °C (°F)	31.5 (88.7)	35.2 (95.4)	36.2 (97.2)	38.0 (100.4)	37.3 (99.1)	36.3 (97.3)	36.6 (97.9)	36.4 (97.5)	36.2 (97.2)	35.4 (95.7)	32.5 (90.5)	30.7 (87.3)	38.0 (100.4)
Mean daily maximum °C (°F)	20.8 (69.4)	23.1 (73.6)	26.5 (79.7)	29.5 (85.1)	30.4 (86.7)	30.0 (86.0)	29.8 (85.6)	30.1 (86.2)	29.9 (85.8)	27.9 (82.2)	24.9 (76.8)	21.9 (71.4)	27.1 (80.8)
Daily mean °C (°F)	14.6 (58.3)	16.2 (61.2)	19.5 (67.1)	22.7 (72.9)	24.6 (76.3)	25.2 (77.4)	25.2 (77.4)	25.1 (77.2)	24.3 (75.7)	22.1 (71.8)	18.5 (65.3)	15.3 (59.5)	21.1 (70.0)
Mean daily minimum °C (°F)	10.6 (51.1)	11.8 (53.2)	14.8 (58.6)	18.2 (64.8)	21.0 (69.8)	22.3 (72.1)	22.4 (72.3)	22.2 (72.0)	20.8 (69.4)	18.5 (65.3)	14.4 (57.9)	11.0 (51.8)	17.3 (63.1)
Record low °C (°F)	−2.8 (27.0)	3.0 (37.4)	4.3 (39.7)	9.5 (49.1)	12.5 (54.5)	15.1 (59.2)	17.7 (63.9)	18.0 (64.4)	13.1 (55.6)	6.4 (43.5)	1.4 (34.5)	−1.5 (29.3)	−2.8 (27.0)
Average rainfall mm (inches)	32.1 (1.26)	36.3 (1.43)	63.5 (2.50)	150.6 (5.93)	237.7 (9.36)	386.4 (15.21)	422.9 (16.65)	344.9 (13.58)	145.5 (5.73)	66.6 (2.62)	45.0 (1.77)	26.8 (1.06)	1,958.5 (77.11)
Average rainy days	6.3	6.6	8.2	14.0	19.1	22.6	25.1	22.1	14.2	9.7	6.4	4.7	159.0
Average relative humidity (%)	80.8	79.0	77.5	78.4	80.9	85.2	86.3	85.7	82.5	81.1	81.0	80.3	81.6
Mean monthly sunshine hours	132.8	137.1	160.1	182.9	181.8	119.2	128.7	150.1	168.7	166.1	159.6	152.6	1,845.3
Source: Vietnam Institute for Building Science and Technology
