= Haplogroup O-M175 =

Haplogroup O. Human Y chromosome DNA grouping common in Asia

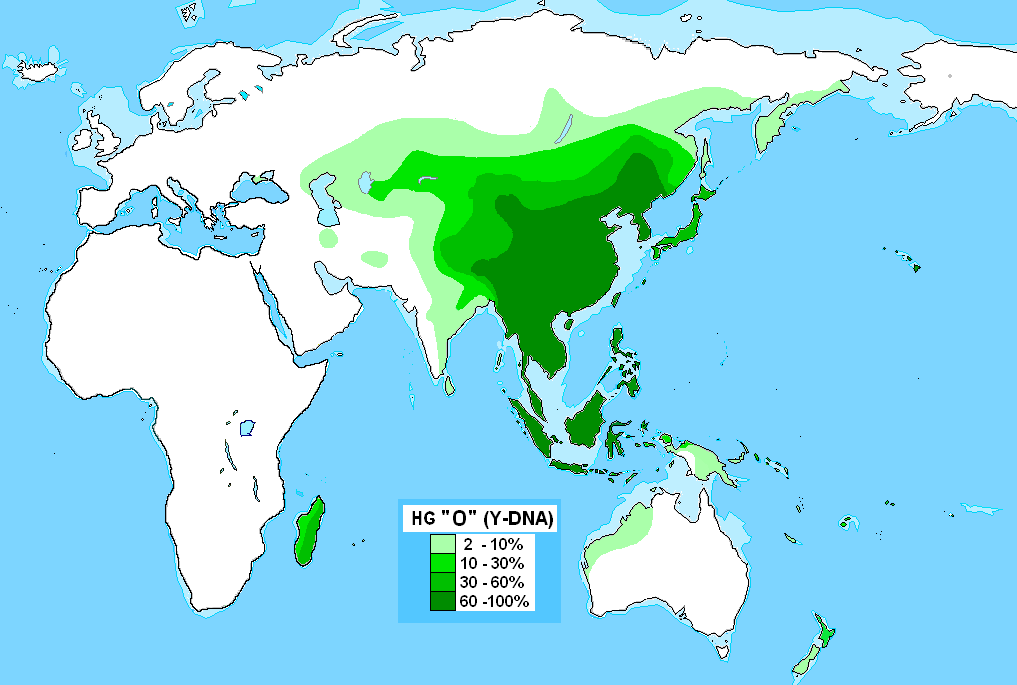
- Possible time of origin: 45,300 (95% HPD interval 39,400 <-> 51,900) ybp 41,750 (95% CI 30,597 <-> 46,041) years ago 44,700 or 38,300 ybp
- Coalescence age: 37,200 (95% HPD interval 32,300 <-> 42,800) ybp 33,943 (95% CI 25,124 <-> 37,631) years (Karmin 2022) 35,000 or 30,000 years ago depending on mutation rate
- Possible place of origin: Southeast Asia or East Asia
- Ancestor: NO
- Descendants: Primary: O1 (O-F265); O2 (O-M122); Secondary: O1a (O-M119); O1b (O-M268); O2a (O-M324); O2b (O-F742)
- Defining mutations: M175 (+ numerous other SNPs).

Haplogroup O, also known as O-M175, is a human Y-chromosome DNA haplogroup. It is primarily found among populations in Southeast Asia and East Asia. It also is found in various percentages of populations of the Russian Far East, Siberia, Central Asia, Caucasus, Crimea, Ukraine, Iran, South Asia, Oceania, Madagascar and the Comoros. Haplogroup O is a primary descendant of haplogroup NO-M214.

The O-M175 haplogroup is very common amongst males from East and Southeast Asia. It has two primary branches: O1 (O-F265) and O2 (O-M122). O1 is found at high frequencies amongst males native to Southeast Asia, Taiwan, the Japanese Archipelago, the Korean Peninsula, Madagascar and some populations in southern China and Austroasiatic speakers of India. O2 is found at high levels amongst Han Chinese, Tibeto-Burman populations (including many of those in Yunnan, Tibet, Burma, Northeast India, and Nepal), Manchu, Mongols (especially those who are citizens of the PRC), Koreans, Vietnamese, Filipinos, Japanese, Thais, Polynesians, Miao people, Hmong, the Naiman tribe of Kazakhs in Kazakhstan, Kazakhs in the southeast of Altai Republic, and Kazakhs in the Ili area of Xinjiang.

== Origins ==
Haplogroup O-M175 is a descendant haplogroup of Haplogroup NO-M214, and first appeared according to different theories either in Southeast Asia (see Rootsi 2006, TMC 1998, Shi 2005, and Bradshaw Foundation) or East Asia (see ISOGG 2012) approximately 40,000 years ago (or between 31,294 and 51,202 years ago according to Karmin et al. 2015).

Haplogroup O-M175 is one of NO-M214's two branches. The other is haplogroup N, which is common throughout North Eurasia.

== Distribution ==
This haplogroup appears in high to moderate frequencies in most populations in both East Asia and Southeast Asia, and it is almost exclusive to that region. It is almost nonexistent in Western Siberia, Western Asia, Europe, most of Africa, India and the Americas, where its presence may be the result of recent migrations. However, certain O subclades do achieve significant frequencies among some populations of Central Asia, South Asia, and Oceania. For example, one study found it at a rate of 67% among the Naimans, a tribe in Kazakhstan, even though the rate among Kazakhs in general is only about 3.3% to 10.8%(Wells et al. 2001). (It is notable that 75% of cases of haplogroup O-M175 observed in the Kazakh sample of Ashirbekov et al. 2017, of which 10.8% have been found to belong to haplogroup O-M175, have been contributed by the Naimans themselves; only 3.1% of the remainder of the Kazakh sample with the Naimans excluded belong to haplogroup O-M175.) Karafet et al. (2015) have assigned the Y-DNA of 46.2% (12/26) of a sample of Papuan from Pantar Island to haplogroup NO-M214; considering their location in the Southeast Archipelago, all or most of these individuals should belong to haplogroup O-M175.

An association with the spread of Austronesian languages in late antiquity is suggested by significant levels of O-M175 among island populations of the South Pacific and Indian Ocean, including the East African littoral. For example, Haplogroup O-M50 has even been found in Bantu-speaking populations of the Comoros along 6% of O-MSY2.2(xM50), while both O-M50 and O-M95(xM88) occur commonly among the Malagasy people of Madagascar with a combined frequency of 34%. O-M175 has been found in 28.1% of Solomon Islanders from Melanesia. 12% of Uyghurs (Wells et al. 2001), 6.8% of Kalmyks (17.1% of Khoshuud, 6.1% of Dörwöd, 3.3% of Torguud, 0% of Buzawa), 6.2% of Altaians (Kharkov et al. 2007), 4.1% of Uzbeks on average but Uzbeks from Bukhara 12.1%, Karakalpaks (Uzbekistan) 11.4%, Sinte (Uzbekistans) 6.7% (Wells et al. 2001) and 4.0% of Buryats.

In the Caucasus region it has been found in the Nogais 6% but 5.3% in the Karan Nogais, it is also found in the Dargins of Dargwa speakers at 2.9%. In the Iranic population, it is found in Iranian (Esfahan) at 6.3% (Wells et al. 2001), 8.9% of Tajiks in Afghanistan 4.2% in the Pathans in Pakistan (Firasat 2007) but 1% in Afghanistan, 3.1% in Burusho (Firasat 2007).

Haplogroup O-M175 ranges in various moderate to high frequencies in the ethnic minorities of South Africa. The frequency of this haplogroup is 6.14% in the Cape colored population, 18% in Cape Coloured Muslim, 38% in Cape Indian Muslims and 10% in Cape Other Muslims. It's found 11.5% in the Réunion Creole.

Haplogroup O-M175 had also been found in Latin America and Caribbean as a result of massive Chinese male migration from the 19th century. It was found in the Jamaicans at 3.8%, and in Cubans, 1.5%.

Haplogroup O-M175 has been found in 88.7% of Asian American. 1.6% in Hispanic American, White Americans 0.5%, and 0.3% in African American. Another study gives 0.5% African American.

Among the sub-branches of haplogroup O-M175 are O-M119(O1a), O-M268(O1b), and O-M122(O2).

Among the ethnic groups of Khyber Pakhtunkhwa, Pakistan, Y Haplogroup O3-M122 makes up the majority of Jadoon's males at 76.32%. It was absent in the studied Sayyid (Syed) samples and appeared in low numbers among Tanolis (0.75%), Gujars (0.81%) and Yousafzais (2.82%). There appears to be founder affect in the O3-M122 among the Jadoon.

Russians in China East Asian haplogroup O made up 58% of their Y haplogroup. O3-M122 specifically made up 47% of the Russian sample. The East Asian Y haplogroup O3-M122 was found in 47% of Russian males in China. In another test the East Asian paternal Y Haplogroup O made up 58% of Russian males samples in China.

Haplogroup O was found in 1%-1.2% of Persians in one sample.

O3-M122 is the commonly shared genetic signature of Sino-Tibetan speaking ethnicities.

=== O-M175* ===
A broad survey of Y-chromosome variation among populations of central Eurasia found haplogroup O-M175(xM119,M95,M122) in 31% (14/45) of a sample of Koreans and in smaller percentages of Crimean Tatars (1/22 = 4.5%), Tajiks (1/16 = 6.25% Dushanbe, 1/40 = 2.5% Samarkand), Uyghurs (2/41 = 4.9%), Uzbeks (1/68 = 1.5% Surxondaryo, 1/70 = 1.4% Xorazm), and Kazakhs (1/54 = 1.9%) (Wells et al. 2001). However, nearly all of the purported Korean O-M175(xM119,M95,M122) Y-chromosomes may belong to Haplogroup O-M176, (Note: O-M175(xM119,M95,M122) is sometimes incorrectly called "O*".) and later studies do not support the finding of O-M175* among similar population samples (Xue 2006, Kim 2011). The reported examples of O-M175(xM119,M95,M122) Y-chromosomes that have been found among these populations might therefore belong to Haplogroup O-M268*(xM95,M176) or Haplogroup O-M176 (O1b2).

A study published in 2013 found O-M175(xM119, M95, M176, M122) Y-DNA in 5.5% (1/18) Iranians from Teheran, 5.4% (2/37) Tajiks from Badakhshan Province of Afghanistan, and 1/97 Mongols from northwest Mongolia, while finding O-M176 only in 1/20 Mongols from northeast Mongolia.

==== O-F265 (O1) ====
O1a-M119 and O1b-M268 share a common ancestor, O1-F265 (a.k.a. O-F75) approximately 33,181 (95% CI 24,461 to 36,879) YBP. O1-F265, in turn, coalesces to a common ancestor with O2-M122 approximately 33,943 (95% CI 25,124 to 37,631) YBP. Thus, O1-F265 should have existed as a single haplogroup parallel to O2-M122 for a duration of approximately 762 years (or anywhere from 0 to 13,170 years considering the 95% CIs and assuming that the phylogeny is correct) before breaking up into its two extant descendant haplogroups, O1-MSY2.2 and O1b-M268.

===== O-M119 (O1a) =====
O-M119 (which was known briefly as O-MSY2.2, until the SNP MSY2.2 was found to be unreliable) is found frequently in Austronesian-speaking people, with a moderate distribution in southern and eastern Chinese and Kra-Dai peoples.

===== O-M268 (O1b) =====
- O-K18 Naxi
  - O-CTS4040
    - O-MF56251 Observed sporadically in China (Guangxi, Guangdong, Sichuan, Zhejiang, Jiangsu, Beijing), Thailand (Phuan, Yuan, Central Thai), Vietnam (Nùng, Tày)
    - O-Page59/CTS10887 Found among North Han Chinese (5%), East Han Chinese (4%), South Han Chinese (3%)
      - O-F4070
        - O-MF106398 Observed sporadically in China (Guangdong, Henan, Hubei, Jiangxi, Sichuan, Zhejiang, Guangxi, Heilongjiang, Jiangsu, Shandong)
        - O-F779/F993/F3135 China, Vietnam (Lahu), Qatar
          - O-MF107014 Observed sporadically in China (Jiangsu, Anhui, Heilongjiang)
          - O-CTS5160/MF61620 China (Han, mostly Guangdong or Fujian)
          - O-F2064/F1759 China (Han from Fujian, Shandong), Singapore, Vietnam (Sila, Hanhi, Kinh), Korea
            - O-PH2797/CTS1127 China (especially Shandong, Jiangsu, Liaoning, Hebei, Anhui, Beijing, Henan, and Shanghai)
              - O-MF66989 Observed sporadically in China (Zhejiang, Guizhou, Hebei, Jiangsu, Shanghai, Shanxi)
              - O-PH2506 China (Beijing), Japan
            - O-Y148532 China (Shandong, Heilongjiang, Liaoning, Jilin, Jiangsu, Shanghai, Sichuan, Beijing, Shaanxi), Afghanistan (Hazara)
            - O-Y239146/MF31164 Singapore, Taiwan
            - O-Y47392/MF17288 China (Zhejiang)
            - O-BY182144/Y157814 China (Shandong, Gansu), Taiwan
              - O-MF16472/MF148514 China (Guangdong, Shandong, Henan, Beijing, Hunan, Jiangsu, etc.)
                - O-MF184575 China (Zhejiang, Jiangxi, Guangxi, Sichuan, Jiangsu, Shandong, Inner Mongolia, Jilin Korean)
              - O-ACT3266/Y149401 China (Shandong, Jiangsu)
            - O-PH4822 China (Beijing, Jiangsu)
      - O-F417/M1654/CTS469 Japan (Tokyo)
        - O-F840/F1247/F1378
          - O-Y185784 Singapore
          - O-CTS250
            - O-F2760 China (Beijing, Dai)
            - O-FGC30081 China (Hubei, Guangdong)
        - O-CTS1451 Korea, China (Hubei, Shandong, Sichuan, Jiangxi, Hunan, Jiangsu, Chongqing, Guangdong, Anhui, Hebei, Henan, Beijing, etc.)
      - O-CTS9996/PF4341 Philippines
        - O-PF4341* Hunan (Han)
        - O-CTS298 China (esp. Jiangsu, Shandong, Henan, Anhui, Shanghai, and Liaoning)
          - O-F16308 China (esp. Hunan)
          - O-MF2931 China (esp. Zhejiang)
        - O-MF14344 China (esp. Shaanxi and Anhui)
          - O-F1356 China (Shandong, Beijing), Vietnam (Kinh from Ho Chi Minh City), South Korea
  - O-PK4
    - O-F838 Found in about 1.4% of Han Chinese (and esp. in Hunan, Chongqing, Jiangxi, Sichuan, Guizhou)
      - O-CTS3857
        - O-F714
          - O-F2081 Shaanxi (Han)
          - O-F3357
            - O-F977 Liaoning
              - O-F1199 Beijing, Sichuan
                - O-ACT7133 Chongqing Liwutu, Jiangxi
                - O-Y168698 Sichuan, Anhui
            - O-CTS4052/CTS5664 Hunan (Han)
              - O-Y155291 Anhui , medieval Turk (fl. ca. 600 - 900 CE) from the oasis of Otrar
              - O-CTS2452 Guangxi, Hunan
        - O-F15640/F11242 Fujian, Singapore, Spain (Burgos)
          - O-F16212
            - O-F21414 Fujian
              - O-F15452
      - O-F15300 Chongqing, Guizhou, Anhui
        - O-F14826 Hunan [Yong zhou Tang family]
          - O-MF45275 Guangxi
          - O-Y34152
            - O-MF43808 Sichuan, Hunan
            - O-MF37500 Hunan
              - O-MF43192 Sichuan, Hunan
    - O-M95
      - O-CTS350 China (Ningxia, Yunnan, Heilongjiang, Hunan, Shaanxi, Anhui, etc.)
        - O-CTS350* Japan (Aichi)
        - O-CTS10007/CTS926 China (esp. Hunan and Guangdong)
      - O-M1310
        - O-Y172653/Y172877 Found in China (esp. Zhejiang, Fujian, Guangdong, Sichuan, Hunan, Jiangxi, Hubei, Chongqing) and Japan
        - O-F1803/M1348 China (Zhejiang, Shandong, Beijing, Guangdong, Hubei, Sichuan, Jiangsu, Shanghai, etc.)
          - O-ACT721/ACT1038 Found sporadically in China (Zhejiang, Anhui, Hunan, Hainan, Tianjin, Beijing, Liaoning, Heilongjiang)
          - O-F789/M1283 Found in China (Blang, Palaung, Wa, Dai, Yi, Naxi), Vietnam, Cambodia, Singapore (Malay), Java, Borneo, Thailand, Laos, Myanmar, Bhutan, Bangladesh, India (Tripura, Ho, Konda Dora, Gond)
            - O-M1283* Lao Isan
            - O-MF600645 Gansu (Hui, Dongxiang), Sichuan (Chengdu), Hunan (Yiyang)
            - O-M1368 Singapore
              - O-M1361
                - O-MF611153 Found sporadically in China (Hunan, Hubei, Chongqing, Guangxi, Jiangxi)
                - O-A22938 Vietnam (Kinh from Ho Chi Minh City), China (Hong Kong, Qinzhou, Chongqing, Lijiang)
                  - O-F2194 China (esp. Guangxi, with a few members in Yunnan, Chongqing, Hubei, etc.)
                  - O-BY189914 China (mostly Guangdong, Guangxi)
                  - O-F16163 China (Guangdong, Sichuan, Hubei, etc.), Taiwan
                    - O-F20644 China (Guangxi, Yunnan, Guangdong, Gansu, Hunan, Sichuan, etc.)
                      - O-SK1646 China (mostly Sichuan, but also Gansu, Yunnan, Guizhou, etc.)
                - O-Y9322 China (Dai in Xishuangbanna, Yunnan, Chongqing, Guangdong, Sichuan, etc.)
                  - O-Y9325
                    - O-Z39485 China (Dai, Yi)
                    - O-Z39490
                      - O-Z39490* Indonesia (Yogyakarta, Lebbo), Singapore (Malay)
                      - O-B421 Sichuan, Singapore (Malay), Java (Dieng), Madhya Pradesh (Gond), Saudi Arabia (ar-Riyāḍ)
                    - O-Y9033/B426 Laos (Laotian), Thailand (Blang, Khmu, Lawa, Htin, Padaung Karen, Tai Dam, Suay, Khmer, Mon, Lao Isan, Soa, Shan, Phutai, Nyaw, S'gaw Karen, Thai, Khon Mueang), Vietnam (Mang from Mường Tè District, Ede from Krông Buk District and Tuy An District, Kinh from Hoàng Mai District, Gia Lâm District, and Yên Phong District, Thái from Điện Biên Phủ, Giarai from Ayun Pa)
                      - O-Y9033* Indonesia (Jawa Tengah), India (Tripura, Konda Dora), Bangladesh
                      - O-M6661 Kinh in Ho Chi Minh City
                      - O-YP3930 Cambodia, Thailand (Mlabri, S'gaw Karen, Pwo Karen, Tai Yuan), Laos (Laotian in Vientiane)
          - O-F1252
            - O-SK1630/F5504 China (esp. Sichuan and Guizhou, accounting for about 0.25% of the entire Chinese population)
              - O-ACT5802
                - O-MF92614
                - O-F16061
                  - O-MF286118 Found in two Han Chinese from Guangdong
                  - O-F19607
                    - O-SK1636 China (esp. Hunan, Sichuan, Guizhou, Chongqing, Gansu, and Henan)
                    - O-MF206811 China (Shaanxi, Sichuan, Henan)
                    - O-MF91645 China (Han from Mianyang, Tujia from Zhangjiajie)
                    - O-Y68888 Russia (Ryazan Oblast)
                    - O-F5506 Hmong (Hunan)
            - O-F2924
              - O-CTS5854
                - O-Z23810
                  - O-CTS7399
                    - O-Y85641 Japan (Tokyo), China (esp. Shandong, Liaoning, Jilin, Heilongjiang)
                    - O-FGC19713/Y14026 Laos (Laotian in Vientiane and Luang Prabang), Thailand (Tai Dam, Tai Lue, Nyah Kur, Thai, Eastern Lawa), Vietnam (Thái from Bá Thước District and Tủa Chùa District, Hà Nhì from Mường Tè District)
                      - O-FGC19707
                        - O-MF14427 China (esp. Jiangsu, Gansu, Henan, Shandong, Shanxi, Hebei, Shaanxi)
                        - O-FGC19716 China (Hong Kong, Guangdong, Hunan, Chongqing)
                          - O-FGC19718 China (esp. Fujian, Jiangxi, Hubei, Jiangsu, Guangdong), Philippines (Capiz)
                        - O-Z23849 China (Chongqing Han, Xishuangbanna Dai, Guangxi Zhuang, Guangdong, Shandong, Tianjin)
                  - O-CTS651/CTS10484 Thailand (Tai Khün, Phuan, Tai Lue, Khon Mueang, Eastern Lawa, Lao Isan, Thai), Laos (Laotian in Vientiane), Vietnam (Dao and Nùng from Hoàng Su Phì District, Tày from Krông Pắk District, Hà Quảng District, and Đình Lập District)
                    - O-CTS10484* China (Guangxi)
                    - O-PH4310 China (Guangdong, Sichuan, Beijing), Singapore
                    - O-Z1018 China (Hunan, Xishuangbanna Dai, Guangxi)
                - O-Z23781 China (Henan)
                  - O-F4229 Singapore
                    - O-F809 China (Xishuangbanna Dai, Guangdong, Chongqing)
                      - O-Z23795 China (esp. Zhejiang)
                        - O-MF223122 China (Linyi, Mianyang)
                        - O-A22937
                          - O-BY50703
                            - O-MF169272 China (Daurs, Qiqihar, Harbin, Heihe, Hulunbuir, Xilingol League, Beijing)
                            - O-MF226417 China (Beijing, Hangzhou)
                          - O-MF61630 China (Baoji, Hanzhong, Shijiazhuang, Tangshan, Yantai, Shaoxing)
                        - O-F2517 China (Hubei, Guangdong, Guangxi, Hunan, etc.)
                          - O-MF5664
                          - O-Z23790
              - O-M111/M88 Found frequently among Vietnamese, Tai peoples (Bouyei, Zhuang, Nùng, Tày, Thái people in Vietnam, Lao, Northeastern Thai, Northern Thai, general population of Bangkok), Lachi, Lô Lô, Hani-Akha, Bunu, She people, Cambodians, Kuy, Bru, and Htin, with a moderate distribution among Qiang, Bai, Yi, Bamar, Jingpo, Lahu, Tujia, Han Chinese, Miao, Pathen, Yao, Hlai, Taiwanese aborigines (especially Bunun), the Philippines, Malaysia (Kota Kinabalu), Kalimantan (Banjarmasin), Java, Chamic-speaking peoples (Cham from Bình Thuận, Ede, Jarai), and Kiribati
                - O-M111/M88* Northern Thailand (Htin, Lawa), Cambodia (Jarai, Brao, Kachac, Khmer, Lao, Lun), Yunnan (De'ang)
                - O-F2524
                  - O-F2524* Jiangsu
                  - O-F2346
                    - O-F2890 Thailand (Khon Mueang, Phuan, Shan, Htin, Tai Dam, Thai, Lawa, Lao Isan, Mon), Vietnam (Kinh from Gia Lâm District, Tày from Lục Yên District)
                      - O-F2890* Ho Chi Minh City
                      - O-Z24048
                        - O-F18990 Jiangsu, Jiangxi, Xishuangbanna (Dai)
                        - O-Z24050
                          - O-Z24050* Xishuangbanna (Dai)
                          - O-ACT7172 Guangdong
                          - O-Y151536
                            - O-Z22028 Hunan, Anhui, Guangdong
                            - O-Y151537
                              - O-Y151537* Hunan
                              - O-ACT523
                                - O-ACT505 Guangdong
                                - O-ACT502 Jiangxi, Hunan, Guangxi
                    - O-F2758 Vietnam (Kinh, Lahu, Dao, Pathen, Tày, Thái, Ede, Giarai), Cambodia (Kuy, Tampuan, Khmer), Thailand (Phutai, Bru, Tai Khün, Phuan, Tai Dam, Shan, Khon Mueang, Mon, Lao Isan, Tai Lue, Htin, Lawa, Khmu, Kaleun, Nyaw, Suay, Thai), Laos (Laotian in Luang Prabang), Yunnan (Bulang, De'ang)
                      - O-F2758* China (Miao, Hunan)
                      - O-Z24083
                        - O-Z24083* Ho Chi Minh City (Kinh)
                        - O-Z24089
                          - O-SK1627/Z24091 Vietnam (Lô Lô from Mèo Vạc District, La Chí and Nùng from Hoàng Su Phì District, Hà Nhì from Mường Tè District, Tày from Chợ Đồn District and Đăk Mil District, Ede from Ea Kar District, Kinh from Nghĩa Hưng District), Thailand (Soa, Saek, Phutai, Suay, Tai Dam, S'gaw Karen, Nyah Kur, Khmer, Lawa, Lao Isan, Mon, Thai), Laos (Laotian in Vientiane)
                            - O-Z24091* China (Hebei, Xishuangbanna Dai), Vietnam (Kinh from Ho Chi Minh City)
                            - O-Y26364
                              - O-Y26364* Thailand (Phutai from Sakon Nakhon Province)
                              - O-Y26370 China (Tujia), Vietnam (Kinh from Ho Chi Minh City)
                          - O-F923
                            - O-F923* Xishuangbanna (Dai), Ho Chi Minh City (Kinh)
                            - O-Z24154 Ho Chi Minh City (Kinh)
                            - O-CTS2022
                              - O-CTS2022* Ho Chi Minh City (Kinh)
                              - O-F3053 Thailand (Tai Lue, Khon Mueang)
                                - O-F3053* Cambodian
                                - O-F4383/F1399 Vietnam (Nùng from Hoàng Su Phì District)
                                  - O-F4383/F1399* China (Han from Chongqing), Singapore
                                  - O-F14994 Vietnam (Kinh from Ho Chi Minh City), Singapore
                                  - O-F2415 Thailand (Tai Lue, Khon Mueang, Lao Isan, Mon, Thai), China (Dai from Xishuangbanna, Yongbei Zhuang from Guangxi, Han from Hunan)
- O-M176
  - O-K4: Found frequently among Koreans and with a moderate distribution among Japanese, Ryukyuans, Daurs, Evenks, Hezhe, Manchus, and Sibe. Also found sporadically (<1%) among Han Chinese, Hui, Micronesians, Mongols, Thais, Uyghurs, Vietnamese, etc.
  - O-47z: Found frequently among Japanese and Ryukyuans and with a moderate distribution among Koreans. Found sporadically (<1%) among Manchus, Mongols, Han Chinese, Hui, Tujia, Vietnamese, etc.

==== O-M122 (O2) ====
Found frequently among populations of East Asia, Southeast Asia, and culturally Austronesian regions of Oceania, with a moderate distribution in Central Asia (Shi 2005).

- O-M122
  - O-CTS1754 East & Southeast Asia
    - O-F953/F1886 Philippines
      - O-F953* Ho Chi Minh City (Kinh)
      - O-F1024
        - O-F1024* Guangxi
        - O-Y29790 Liaoning, Fujian
  - O-M324
    - O-L465
      - O-CTS727
        - O-F915
          - O-F915* Shanxi
          - O-Y14462
            - O-Y14462* Guangdong
            - O-CTS1936 Beijing, Ho Chi Minh City
            - O-A18267
              - O-A18029 China
              - O-ACT6559 Hebei
        - O-CTS3709
          - O-CTS11209
            - O-CTS11209* Han from Hunan
            - O-L599 Han from Hunan, Kinh from Ho Chi Minh City, Tujia
          - O-F2640
            - O-F2640* Beijing
            - O-CTS11210
              - O-CTS11210* Han from Hunan
              - O-CTS2432 Han from Hunan
      - O-JST002611/CTS2483
        - O-CTS2483* China, Japan, Philippines
        - O-CTS10573 Beijing, Sichuan, Henan, Jiangsu
          - O-CTS10573* Beijing, Dai from Xishuangbanna
          - O-MF7367
            - O-MF7367* Dai
            - O-MF9367 South Korea, Japan (Kōchi)
        - O-F18
          - O-CTS498 China, Japan (Tokyo)
          - O-F449 Azerbaijan
            - O-F1266, F2016, F4267 Beijing, Jilin, Shanxi, Jiangsu, Shanghai, Guangdong
            - O-F238
              - O-FGC62457
                - O-CTS679 Hubei, Fujian (Han)
                - O-MF19356 Guizhou, Chongqing, Jiangxi
              - O-F134
                - O-F134*
                - O-F1894 Beijing, Shanghai, Liaoning, Jilin, Hebei, Shanxi, Zhejiang, Guangdong
                  - O-F1894* Hunan (Han), Beijing
                  - O-MF18144
                    - O-MF18144* Shandong
                    - O-F18567 South Korea, Japanese
                - O-MF8794
                  - O-MF8794* China (Han)
                  - O-MF1155
                    - O-MF1155* Anhui, Myanmar (Mandalay)
                    - O-MF1157 Guangdong, Jiangxi, Russia (Moscow Oblast)
          - O-F117
            - O-F117* Fujian
            - O-F11
              - O-F11* Gansu, Japanese
              - O-F930 Beijing, Armenia, Inner Mongolia, Hebei, Shaanxi, Shandong, Zhejiang, Hubei
                - O-F2685 Beijing, Shanghai, Fujian, Guangdong
              - O-BY169374
                - O-BY169374* Zhejiang
                - O-SK1692
                  - O-SK1692* Guangdong
                  - O-MF55116 Pakistan (Hazaras)
              - O-F539 Beijing, Shanghai, Jiangsu, Zhejiang, Jiangxi, Guangdong, Yunnan
                - O-F539*
                - O-F319 Vietnam (Ho Chi Minh City), Hunan
              - O-CTS12877
                - O-F16635
                  - O-F16635* South Korea
                  - O-ACT3882 Hubei, Hunan (Han)
                - O-CTS257 Zhejiang, Shanghai, Guangdong, Beijing, Fujian, Heilongjiang, Hunan
                  - O-CTS257* South Korea, Japan (Tokyo)
                  - O-F16834
                    - O-F16834* Vietnam (Ho Chi Minh City)
                    - O-Y166692 Lahu, Yi
              - O-Y29837
                - O-Y29837* Hebei, Fujian (Han)
                - O-MF8526
                  - O-MF8526* Sichuan, Zhejiang
                  - O-Y135777 China
              - O-BY36917 Japan
                - O-F270 Beijing, Hebei, Shandong
                  - O-F270* Hezhen
                  - O-F1272 Jiangsu
              - O-F4062 Beijing, Shanghai, Guangdong, Jiangsu, Shandong, Shaanxi, Chongqing, Heilongjiang, Liaoning, Henan, Hubei, Hunan, Zhejiang
                - O-Y15976 China, Japan, Korea, Pakistan, Vietnam
                  - O-Y15976* Zhejiang, Vietnam (Ho Chi Minh City)
                  - O-Y26383
                    - O-Y26383* Hubei
                    - O-SK1686
                      - O-SK1686* Pakistan (Brahui)
                      - O-Y46851 South Korea
                - O-FGC54474
                  - O-FGC54474* Skeleton exhumed from a mass grave (2083 ± 27 YBP uncal) located in Nomgon, Ömnögovi, Mongolia
                  - O-FGC54505 China, Japan (Okinawa)
                  - O-MF8460 Anhui
                  - O-MF9523 South Korea
              - O-F971 Beijing, Shanghai, Hubei, Guangdong
                - O-F971* Sichuan, Zhejiang, Jiangxi, Japan
                - O-Y23813
                  - O-Y23813* Guangdong
                  - O-Y23809
                    - O-Y23809* Guangdong
                    - O-BY170727
                    - O-Y23907 Guangdong
              - O-F632
                - O-F632* Beijing
                - O-F16340 Zhejiang
                - O-F133 China, Bulgaria
                  - O-F133* Beijing
                  - O-Y20951
                    - O-Y20951* Anhui
                    - O-Y20932 Anhui, Beijing
                  - O-F17
                    - O-F377 China, France
                      - O-CTS7789 Han Chinese (Beijing, Shanghai, Fujian, Guangdong, Hunan, Sichuan)
                        - O-CTS7789* Beijing, Guangdong
                        - O-F1095
                          - O-F1095* Fujian (Han)
                          - O-Z25097
                            - O-Z25097* Hunan (Han)
                            - O-Z7776 Hunan (Han), Guangdong
                      - O-CTS7501
                        - O-CTS7501* Zhejiang, Hunan (Han)
                        - O-CTS1621
                          - O-CTS1621* Hubei, Hunan (Han)
                          - O-Y147084 Jiangxi
                    - O-F793 Beijing, Tianjin, Shandong, Shanxi, Shaanxi, Xinjiang, Jiangsu, Shanghai, Hubei, Sichuan, Guangdong
                      - O-F793* Sichuan, Guangdong, Guizhou, Hunan, Jiangsu, French Polynesia, She, North China (Han)
                      - O-Y150436
                        - O-Y150436* Jiangxi
                        - O-Y150331 Jiangxi, Yunnan
                      - O-Y141213 Jilin, Liaoning, Henan, Shandong, Jiangsu
    - O-P201
      - O-M188
        - O-M188* Korea
        - O-CTS800
          - O-CTS800* Beijing, Japan
          - O-CTS1602 Han from Fujian
        - O-CTS445
          - O-CTS201 Korea
            - O-M159 China (about 0.79% of the national male population), Taiwan, Cambodia, Malaysia, Singapore
              - O-FTA21663/O-MF22947 China (Heilongjiang, Inner Mongolia, Zhejiang, Shanghai, Henan, Hebei, etc.; accounts for about 0.06% of the male population in China at present), Saudi Arabia (al-Qaṣīm)
              - O-CTS3994
                - O-MF125236 China
                - O-Z25482
                  - O-Z25518 China (mainly distributed in Guangdong, Fujian, and Jiangxi at present, accounting for about 0.63% of the national male population)
                    - O-Z35182
                      - O-Z35182* China (Han)
                      - O-MF2541 Fujian, Taiwan (Chiayi City), Cambodia (Siem Reap)
                    - O-CTS5032
                      - O-CTS5032* Hunan (Han)
                      - O-CTS10690 Hunan (Han)
            - O-MF18110/FGC50590 China (esp. Guangdong, Zhejiang, Hunan, Shandong, and Guangxi)
              - O-MF109844
                - O-MF106775 China (esp. Shandong, Jiangsu, and Henan)
                - O-MF106730 China (esp. Guangdong and Guangxi)
              - O-FGC50661 China (esp. Jiangsu and Hunan)
                - O-MF56709
                  - O-MF213370 Found sporadically in Yangzhou, Shanghai, Liangshan
                  - O-MF56898 China (esp. Hunan, Sichuan, Chongqing, Shanghai)
                - O-FGC50643/MF15475 China (Shandong, Hebei, Hubei, Shanxi, Anhui, Jiangsu, etc.)
                  - O-MF56474 China (Jiangsu, Anhui, Jilin, Shandong, etc.)
                  - O-FGC50649
                    - O-Y169670/O-MF14256 China (esp. Jiangsu, Shandong, Zhejiang, and Shanghai)
                      - O-MF50824
                        - O-MF106512 China (observed in a few individuals from Changzhou, Taizhou, and Togtoh County)
                        - O-MF88959/O-Y150315 South Korea, China (Zhejiang, Shanghai, Jiangsu, Shandong, Henan, Shanxi, Shaanxi, Guangdong)
                      - O-MF14135/O-Z12303 China (currently accounts for about 0.44% of the total male population)
                        - O-MF238642
                          - O-MF37094 China (Zhejiang, Jiangsu)
                          - O-Y169696/O-MF15693 China (Jiangsu, Fufeng County, Beijing, Tangshan, Feidong County, Chifeng, Xi County, Min County, Laizhou, Rushan, Harbin, Yanji, Dancheng County)
                          - O-MF18577/O-MF18626 China (currently accounts for about 0.23% of all males in China, especially in Jiangsu [1.08%], Shanghai [0.69%], Ningxia [0.39%], Shandong [0.38%], Anhui [0.33%], Heilongjiang [0.32%], Zhejiang [0.31%], and Jilin [0.26%]), Kazakhstan, Thailand
                    - O-FGC50558 Japan, Korea
                      - O-FGC50558* Korea, Japanese
                      - O-Y165513 Korea
                      - O-FGC50535 Korea
          - O-M7 Found frequently among human remains associated with the Neolithic Daxi culture and modern Hmong–Mien, Katuic, and Bahnaric peoples, with a moderate distribution among Han Chinese (Xue 2006), Buyei (Xue 2006), Bai (Wen 2004), Mosuo (Wen 2004), Tibetans (Wen 2004), Qiang (Xue 2006), Oroqen (Xue 2006), Tujia (Su 2000), Thai (Su 2000), Orang Asli (Su 2000), western Indonesians (Su 2000 and Kayser 2008), Malaysians (Kayser 2008), Vietnamese (Kayser 2008), and Atayal (Su 2000).
            - O-MF106687 China (Jinghu District, etc.)
            - O-Z25245
              - O-MF9858/O-Z6157 China (approximately 0.08% of all males in present-day China), Thailand (Central Thai in Central Thailand)
                - O-MF9896 China (Tongxiang, Ningbo, Zhengzhou, Zigong, Suining, Jingdezhen, etc.)
                - O-PH204 China (Wuhan, Xianning, Huanggang, Wuxi, Wuhu, Tongling, Ganzhou, Fuzhou, Meizhou, Huizhou, Heyuan, Baotou, etc.), Taiwan
              - O-Y26422
                - O-Y26395/O-SK1713 Taiwan (Amis)
                - O-F21738 Philippines, Malaysia (1505 - 1653 CE Kinabatagan, Sabah), Indonesia (30 BCE - 10 CE Topogaro, Sulawesi), Taiwan (Hanben 3734 from the Hanben site, Yilan County, Late Iron Age, 300 - 450 CE)
              - O-F1276
                - O-F1863
                  - O-MF107102 China (Tongchuan District)
                  - O-MF56735 China (Haiyan County, Suzhou, Wuxi, Shanghai, etc.)
                  - O-MF36531 China (Han in Yanping District)
                    - O-Y13816
                      - O-MF109664 China (Kazakh in Minqin County, Kazakh in Tacheng City, Han in Zizhong County, Han in Furong District)
                      - O-MF36502 Guangdong (Kaiping, Yangjiang, Foshan, Lianjiang, etc.)
                  - O-F1134
                    - O-MF35799/O-Y94171 Thailand (Mon in Central Thailand), China (observed sporadically in Pingyang County, Yunan County, Siming District, Longyao County, Shanwei, etc.)
                    - O-F1262/O-Y173492 China (accounts for about 0.15% of the male population in China at present and is relatively concentrated in Zhejiang, Taiwan, Anhui, Jiangxi, etc.; also observed in individuals from Zhenjiang, Hejian, and Langfang)
                  - O-FT303223/O-MF106843/O-F15314/O-F20756 China (Changsha, Chancheng District, Wanzhou District, Chaoyang District, Dongying, Chifeng, Liaoyuan, Harbin, Han in Zhengzhou, Dai in Xishuangbanna), Thailand (Khon Mueang in Northern Thailand, Black Tai in Loei Province)
                  - O-Z25288/O-Z25293 Vietnam (Kinh in Ho Chi Minh City, Hanoi, Nam Dinh, and Lao Cai, Giarai in Gia Lai, Tày in Thai Nguyen)
                - O-CTS6489
                  - O-MF106428/O-Y94472/O-FTB23660 Thailand (Phayao, Phutai, Lao Isan, Tai Lue, Phuan, Shan, Khon Mueang/Tai Yuan, Khmer, Mon), Vietnam (Tày in Lào Cai), China (Dai in Xishuangbanna, Achang in Yunnan; accounts for about 0.05% of all males in China at present, mainly distributed in Guangxi and Guangdong)
                  - O-F1275 Guangxi (Dushan 4-1 ca. 7024 - 6643 BCE)
                    - O-MF15199/O-FTA25885
                      - O-F20472
                        - O-FTB23785 Thailand, Vietnam
                        - O-F17410/O-F18833/O-MF122643/O-BY177553 Thailand (Lao Isan in Northeast Thailand)
                          - O-MF106415/O-MF111486/O-BY122399 Thailand (Shan in Mae Hong Son Province), China (observed sporadically in individuals from Hubei, Hunan, Chongqing, Sichuan, Guangxi, Jiangxi, Zhejiang, Jiangsu, Anhui, Gansu, Shaanxi, Shanxi, Henan, and Shandong)
                          - O-Y127482/O-F15988 Thailand (Nyahkur and Lao Isan in Northeast Thailand)
                            - O-F23936 Thailand (Central Thai in Western Thailand, Khmer in Northeast Thailand), Singapore
                              - O-FTB24349/O-FTB25408 Thailand (Sgaw Karen in North Thailand)
                            - O-F26466 Thailand (Central Thai in North/Central Thailand)
                              - O-F15259/O-Y238116 Singapore
                                - O-F19496
                                  - O-F19315 Singapore
                                  - O-F14817 Singapore, Thailand (Central Thai in Western Thailand and Eastern Thailand), Indonesia
                      - O-MF6534/O-MF58872/O-BY27925/O-Y23477 Thailand (Central Thai in Central Thailand, Phuan in Central Thailand, Khon Mueang in North Thailand, White Hmong in Chiang Rai Province), Singapore, China (Guangdong, Guangxi, Hunan, Sichuan, Jiangxi, Zhejiang, Shaanxi, Henan, Shandong)
                      - O-CTS6579
                        - O-CTS123/O-F22573/O-MF48275 China (Hunan Han; accounts for about 0.13% of the male population in China at present, mainly distributed in Jiangxi, Hunan and other south-central provinces and cities)
                        - O-F14832/O-F15788/O-Y208219 China (accounts for about 0.22% of the male population in China at present, mainly distributed in the northern region), Thailand (Mon in Western Thailand, Tai Lue in Northern Thailand)
                    - O-Z25411
                      - O-ACT1126/O-Y140772/O-F1289 China (relatively concentrated in northern China at present, accounting for about 0.24% of the national male population; also found in Fujian), Thailand (Lisu)
                      - O-Z25398
                        - O-F22005/O-Z25400 Thailand (Black Hmong in North Thailand), Vietnam (Kinh in Ho Chi Minh City), China (currently distributed mainly in Guangxi, Sichuan, Guangdong and other places, accounting for about 0.10% of the national male population)
                        - O-F1100/O-Y37861 Hunan
                          - O-MF17697 Laos, Thailand, China (Jiangsu, Hunan, Jiangxi, Guangxi, Guangdong, Guizhou, Yunnan, Fujian, Sichuan, Hong Kong, Chongqing, Henan, Liaoning)
                          - O-F1234/O-Y37855
                            - O-Y185160/O-MF36985 Hebei, Beijing, Sichuan, Shaanxi, Guangxi, Zhejiang, Shandong, Ningxia, Inner Mongolia, Hubei, Jiangxi (currently accounts for approximately 0.13% of the Chinese male population)
                            - O-FGC71370
                              - O-MF193618 Sichuan, Zhejiang, Shandong, Anhui, Hunan, Hubei, Fujian (currently accounts for about 0.08% of the male population in China, mainly distributed in Guangdong, Hunan, Anhui and other provinces and cities), Philippines
                              - O-F14904/N5 Ningxia, Hmong (Northern Thailand), She, Iu Mien (Phayao Province), Quebec. Huang et al. (2022) found that this is the most common Y-chromosome haplogroup among many Hmongic-speaking ethnic groups (including Guangxi Miao, Hunan Miao, Hunan Pa-hng, and Thailand Hmong), with a frequency of 47.1% among the Guangxi Miao.
      - O-P164
        - O-F996/F3237
          - O-A16433 Heilongjiang
            - O-MF56976 Anhui
            - O-Y125645
              - O-Y149134 Anhui, Henan
              - O-PF5573
                - O-PF5573* Guangdong
                - O-Y101407 Korea
                - O-MF14338
                  - O-MF14338* Tatarstan
                  - O-Y153434
                    - O-Y153434* Shandong
                    - O-MF76414 Chongqing, Skeleton exhumed from a mass grave (2083 ± 27 YBP uncal) located in Nomgon, Ömnögovi, Mongolia
          - O-F871
            - O-F706 Philippines, China, Cambodia, Thailand (Bru in Sakon Nakhon Province)
              - O-F1010 Thailand (Eastern Lawa, Blang, Palaung, Khon Mueang from Chiang Rai Province)
                - O-F1010* Zhejiang
                - O-Y170907
                  - O-Y170907* South Korea
                  - O-Y171445 Zhejiang, Japan (Mie)
              - O-AM01750/AM01861/B451 Singapore (Malay), Indonesia (Bajo), Philippines (Batak)
                - O-AM01861* Spain
                - O-B450 Philippines, Indonesia (Bajo), Singapore (Malay)
                  - O-BY157019 Mexico (Jalisco), Micronesia
                - O-A16139 Philippines (Cebu), USA (California)
            - O-F2472
              - O-F4110 Thailand (Pray)
                - O-F4110* Fujian
                - O-MF1510
                  - O-MF1510* Tonga (ʻEua)
                  - O-ACT3918 Zhejiang
              - O-F4124
                - O-F15739
                  - O-F14875 Vietnam (Ho Chi Minh City), Xinjiang (Han)
                - O-F26088/JST008425p6 Japan, Hunan (Tujia, HGDP01102)
                  - O-A16609
                    - O-MF1232 Henan, Fujian (Han)
        - O-M134: Found frequently among speakers of Sino-Tibetan languages, among members of the Kazakh Naiman tribe with a moderate distribution throughout East Asia and Southeast Asia.
          - O-Y20/PAGES00125 Poland
            - O-F1725
              - O-F1725* Ho Chi Minh City (Kinh)
              - O-Y31255
                - O-FGC61200
                  - O-FGC61200* Henan (Han)
                  - O-FGC61168 Sichuan
                - O-A16615/CTS11009
                  - O-Y85894
                    - O-Y85894* Fujian
                    - O-Y19010 Shandong
                  - O-CTS682/CTS2272
                    - O-BY146675 Korean
                    - O-BY161237 Japan (Tokyo, Kanagawa)
            - O-Y12/F314
              - O-Y12* Beijing (Han)
              - O-CTS2643/CTS11192
                - O-CTS53
                  - O-CTS53* China
                  - O-CTS6373 Hunan (Han), Xishuangbanna (Dai)
                - O-F876
                  - O-F876* Henan, Shaanxi
                  - O-Y29829 Liaoning
                - O-F275
                  - O-F275* Henan, Shandong
                  - O-F14411/CTS1011 Japan
                    - O-Z2037 Beijing (Han)
                    - O-CTS2815
                      - O-CTS2815* South Korea
                      - O-F700
                        - O-F700* Hunan, Liaoning, Japan (Tokyo)
                        - O-F14475 Hunan (Han)
                          - O-F2505
                            - O-F2505* Hebei
                            - O-MF194 Korean, Ho Chi Minh City (Kinh)
                - O-F634
                  - O-F634* Shandong
                  - O-F209 Beijing (Han)
                    - O-F1391
                      - O-F1391* Zhejiang
                      - O-F4117 Jiangxi, Sichuan (Han)
                    - O-A5034
                      - O-MF357
                        - O-ACT1039
                        - O-MF308 Korean
                      - O-CTS4266
                        - O-F14839 Henan (Han)
                        - O-Z26108
                          - O-Y30135
                            - O-Y30135* Beijing (Han)
                            - O-F2173
                              - O-F2173* Sichuan (Han)
                              - O-F1458 Shandong, Anhui
                          - O-Z26156
                            - O-Z26156* Ho Chi Minh City (Kinh)
                            - O-BY102696
                              - O-BY102696* Korean
                              - O-BY61500 Guangdong
                - O-CTS3776/F2887
                  - O-CTS3776* Beijing (Han), Fujian (Han), Japan
                  - O-CTS3763
                    - O-CTS4601 Fujian
                    - O-Y7110
                      - O-Y13527
                        - O-Y13527* Beijing (Han)
                        - O-FGC16888/Z38720 Taiwan
                          - O-MF805 Guizhou, South Korea
                          - O-Y22112
                            - O-FGC16885/FGC16887 Kazakhstan
                      - O-Y7111
                        - O-MF13415 China
                        - O-F4249/SK1769 China, South Korea
                          - O-F4249* Jiangsu
                          - O-FGC23868
                            - O-FGC23868* Mongol (Hulunbuir)
                            - O-FGC23859 Jiangsu
                        - O-CTS335 Zhejiang, Jiangsu, Gansu
                          - O-CTS335* Japan (Tokyo), Xibo
                          - O-Y142071
                            - O-Y142071* Anhui
                            - O-CTS3856
                              - O-CTS3856* Beijing (Han)
                              - O-CTS5741
                                - O-CTS1174 Hunan (Han)
                                - O-F15948 Jiangxi, Thailand
          - O-M117/PAGE23
            - O-MF1380/CTS4960 China, Korea, Japan, Indonesia
              - O-MF1388
                - O-MF1388* North China (Han), Japan (Akita)
                - O-Y139283 Anhui, Guangdong
              - O-MF2636
                - O-MF2636* Chongqing
                - O-CTS374 Jiangsu, Beijing (Han)
            - O-M133/M1706 Shandong
              - O-M1706* Japan (Tokyo)
              - O-YP4864
                - O-YP4864* Korean
                - O-Z44076 Shandong, Philippines (Cebu)
              - O-CTS7634
                - O-CTS7634* Fujian (Han), Beijing (Han), Mongolia (Selenge), Russia
                - O-F2188
                  - O-MF23641
                    - O-MF23641* China
                    - O-Y169190 Fujian
                  - O-Y29861 Henan, Fujian, Ho Chi Minh City (Kinh)
                  - O-F3039 Shandong, Ho Chi Minh City (Kinh), Philippines (Cebu)
              - O-M1726
                - O-A9457
                  - O-A9457*
                  - O-MF15246 Zhejiang, Korean
                  - O-F17158
                    - O-F15367
                      - O-F15367* Guangdong
                      - O-Y174543 Hunan, Japan (Tokyo)
                - O-CTS9678
                  - O-CTS9678* Tianjin
                  - O-M1513
                    - O-M1513* Shandong
                    - O-F18746 Fujian (Han)
                  - O-Z39663 Russia, Liaoning, Shandong, Fujian (Han)
              - O-A9459
                - O-F6800
                  - O-F6800* Shanxi
                  - O-Y8389
                    - O-Y8389* Japan (Tokyo)
                    - O-Y9144
                      - O-Y9144* Guangdong
                      - O-Y8387
                        - O-Y8387* Shanghai, Chongqing
                        - O-CTS5481 Japan (Tokyo), Korean
                - O-F14249
                  - O-F14249* Liaoning
                  - O-ACT4506 Mongol (Hulunbuir), Guangdong
                  - O-Y81597 South Korea, North Korea (North Hamgyong Province)
                  - O-F14347
                    - O-F14347* Beijing (Han)
                    - O-CTS5063
                      - O-CTS5063* Sichuan, Jiangxi, Fujian
                      - O-Z44927
                        - O-Z44927* Anhui
                        - O-MF21798 Zhejiang, Xishuangbanna (Dai)
                      - O-CTS1154
                        - O-CTS1154* Fujian, Guangxi
                        - O-Z25902
                          - O-Z25902* Hebei, Fujian
                          - O-Z42620 Fujian, Ho Chi Minh City (Kinh)
                - O-F438 Japan (Tokyo)
                  - O-F438* Hunan (Han)
                  - O-Y17728
                    - O-Y17728* Beijing (Han), Shandong
                    - O-Y170157 Shandong, Korean
                    - O-F1754
                      - O-F1754* Beijing (Han)
                      - O-F2137
                        - O-F2137* Jiangsu
                        - O-F1123 Jilin, Zhejiang
                    - O-F316
                      - O-F316* Anhui
                      - O-CTS1304
                        - O-CTS1304* Jiangsu, Shandong
                        - O-F813
                          - O-F813* Shandong, Jiangxi, Guangdong
                          - O-Y138426 Shandong, Chongqing
                          - O-Y154488 Hunan
                          - O-Y20928 Henan
                            - O-Y20928* Inner Mongolia, Beijing (Han), Shandong, Anhui
                            - O-Y174105
                              - O-Y174105* Henan
                              - O-Y137637 Shandong, Jiangsu
                - O-CTS1642
                  - O-CTS1642* Bangladesh
                  - O-CTS5308
                    - O-CTS5308* Beijing (Han)
                    - O-F20067
                      - O-F20067* Shannan (Tibetan)
                      - O-M3873 Gansu, Shigatse (Tibetan)
                    - O-Y34065
                      - O-Y34065* Northeast India (Riang)
                      - O-F16227 Shigatse (Sherpa), Xishuangbanna (Dai)
                    - O-MF1012
                      - O-MF1012* Nyingchi (Tibetan)
                      - O-Y67478
                        - O-Y67478*
                        - O-CTS5672 Japanese
                  - O-F14408
                    - O-Y101264 Shigatse (Tibetan), Northeast India (Riang)
                    - O-F14422
                      - O-F14422* Northeast India (Riang), Myanmar (Yangon)
                      - O-A9463
                        - O-A9463* Bangladesh
                        - O-Y34067 Northeast India (Riang)
                      - O-F14665 Xishuangbanna (Dai), Naxi
                      - O-Y7080
                        - O-Y7080* Xishuangbanna (Dai), Guangdong
                        - O-ACT1169 Guangdong, Fujian
                        - O-Z26030
                          - O-Z26030* Guangxi
                          - O-F14479 Guangdong, Xishuangbanna (Dai), Ho Chi Minh City (Kinh)

== Language families and genes ==
Haplogroup O is associated with populations which speak Austric languages. The following is a phylogenetic tree of language families and their corresponding SNP markers, or haplogroups, sourced mainly from Edmondson 2007 and Shi 2005. This has been called the "Father Tongue Hypothesis" by George van Driem (van Driem 2011). It does not appear to account for O-M176, which is found among Japanese, Korean, and Manchurian males.

- (M175)
  - O2 (M122)
    - Sino-Tibetan O2a2b1 (M134)
      - Tibeto-Burman
      - Sinitic O2a2b1a1 (M117)
    - Hmong–Mien O2a2a1a2 (M7)
      - - Hmong (Miao)
        - She (Ratliff 1998)
      - Mien (Yao)
  - O1 (F265) ("Austric")
    - - Austroasiatic O1b1a1a (M95)
        - Munda
        - Mon–Khmer
      - Austro-Tai O1a (M119)
        - Austronesian
          - Formosan
          - Malayo-Polynesian
        - Kra–Dai
          - Kadai (Note: The outlier Kadai branch is called "Kra" by Thai linguist Weera Ostapirat and "Geyang" by Chinese linguists.)
          - Kam–Tai
            - Kam–Sui
            - Tai

== Phylogenetics ==
=== Phylogenetic history ===
Prior to 2002, there were in academic literature at least seven naming systems for the Y-Chromosome Phylogenetic tree. This led to considerable confusion. In 2002, the major research groups came together and formed the Y-Chromosome Consortium (YCC). They published a joint paper that created a single new tree that all agreed to use. Later, a group of citizen scientists with an interest in population genetics and genetic genealogy formed a working group to create an amateur tree aiming at being, above all, timely. The table below brings together all of these works at the point of the landmark 2002 YCC Tree. This allows a researcher reviewing older published literature to quickly move between nomenclatures.

YCC 2002/2008 (Shorthand)	(α)	(β)	(γ)	(δ)	(ε)	(ζ)	(η)	YCC 2002 (Longhand)	YCC 2005 (Longhand)	YCC 2008 (Longhand)	YCC 2010r (Longhand)	ISOGG 2006	ISOGG 2007	ISOGG 2008	ISOGG 2009	ISOGG 2010	ISOGG 2011	ISOGG 2012
O-M175	26	VII	1U	28	Eu16	H9	I	O*	O	O	O	O	O	O	O	O	O	O
O-M119	26	VII	1U	32	Eu16	H9	H	O1*	O1a	O1a	O1a	O1a	O1a	O1a	O1a	O1a	O1a	O1a
O-M101	26	VII	1U	32	Eu16	H9	H	O1a	O1a1	O1a1a	O1a1a	O1a1	O1a1	O1a1a	O1a1a	O1a1a	O1a1a	O1a1a
O-M50	26	VII	1U	32	Eu16	H10	H	O1b	O1a2	O1a2	O1a2	O1a2	O1a2	O1a2	O1a2	O1a2	O1a2	O1a2
O-P31	26	VII	1U	33	Eu16	H5	I	O2*	O2	O2	O2	O2	O2	O2	O2	O2	O2	O2
O-M95	26	VII	1U	34	Eu16	H11	G	O2a*	O2a	O2a	O2a	O2a	O2a	O2a	O2a	O2a	O2a1	O2a1
O-M88	26	VII	1U	34	Eu16	H12	G	O2a1	O2a1	O2a1	O2a1	O2a1	O2a1	O2a1	O2a1	O2a1	O2a1a	O2a1a
O-SRY465	20	VII	1U	35	Eu16	H5	I	O2b*	O2b	O2b	O2b	O2b	O2b	O2b	O2b	O2b	O2b	O2b
O-47z	5	VII	1U	26	Eu16	H5	I	O2b1	O2b1a	O2b1	O2b1	O2b1a	O2b1a	O2b1	O2b1	O2b1	O2b1	O2b1
O-M122	26	VII	1U	29	Eu16	H6	L	O3*	O3	O3	O3	O3	O3	O3	O3	O3	O3	O3
O-M121	26	VII	1U	29	Eu16	H6	L	O3a	O3a	O3a1	O3a1	O3a1	O3a1	O3a1	O3a1	O3a1	O3a1a	O3a1a
O-M164	26	VII	1U	29	Eu16	H6	L	O3b	O3b	O3a2	O3a2	O3a2	O3a2	O3a2	O3a2	O3a2	O3a1b	O3a1b
O-M159	13	VII	1U	31	Eu16	H6	L	O3c	O3c	O3a3a	O3a3a	O3a3	O3a3	O3a3a	O3a3a	O3a3a	O3a3a	O3a3a
O-M7	26	VII	1U	29	Eu16	H7	L	O3d*	O3c	O3a3b	O3a3b	O3a4	O3a4	O3a3b	O3a3b	O3a3b	O3a2b	O3a2b
O-M113	26	VII	1U	29	Eu16	H7	L	O3d1	O3c1	O3a3b1	O3a3b1	-	O3a4a	O3a3b1	O3a3b1	O3a3b1	O3a2b1	O3a2b1
O-M134	26	VII	1U	30	Eu16	H8	L	O3e*	O3d	O3a3c	O3a3c	O3a5	O3a5	O3a3c	O3a3c	O3a3c	O3a2c1	O3a2c1
O-M117	26	VII	1U	30	Eu16	H8	L	O3e1*	O3d1	O3a3c1	O3a3c1	O3a5a	O3a5a	O3a3c1	O3a3c1	O3a3c1	O3a2c1a	O3a2c1a
O-M162	26	VII	1U	30	Eu16	H8	L	O3e1a	O3d1a	O3a3c1a	O3a3c1a	O3a5a1	O3a5a1	O3a3c1a	O3a3c1a	O3a3c1a	O3a2c1a1	O3a2c1a1

==== Original Research Publications ====
The following research teams per their publications were represented in the creation of the YCC Tree.

- α Jobling and Tyler-Smith 2000 and Kaladjieva 2001
- β Underhill 2000
- γ Hammer 2001
- δ Karafet 2001
- ε Semino 2000
- ζ Su 1999
- η Capelli 2001

=== Phylogenetic trees ===
ISOGG 2017 tree (ver. 12.244).

- O (M175)
  - O1 (F265/M1354, CTS2866, F75/M1297, F429/M1415, F465/M1422)
    - O1a (M119)
      - O1a1 (B384/Z23193)
        - O1a1a (M307.1/P203.1)
          - O1a1a1 (F446)
            - O1a1a1a (F140)
              - O1a1a1a1 (F78)
                - O1a1a1a1a (F81)
                  - O1a1a1a1a1 (CTS2458)
                    - O1a1a1a1a1a (F533)
                      - O1a1a1a1a1a1 (F492)
                        - O1a1a1a1a1a1a (F656)
                          - O1a1a1a1a1a1a1 (A12440)
                            - O1a1a1a1a1a1a1a (A12439)
                          - O1a1a1a1a1a1a2 (A14788)
                          - O1a1a1a1a1a1a3 (F65)
                          - O1a1a1a1a1a1a4 (MF1068)
                          - O1a1a1a1a1a1a5 (Z23482)
                        - O1a1a1a1a1a1b (FGC66168)
                          - O1a1a1a1a1a1b1 (CTS11553)
                        - O1a1a1a1a1a1c (Y31266)
                          - O1a1a1a1a1a1c1 (Y31261)
                        - O1a1a1a1a1a1d (A12441)
                        - O1a1a1a1a1a1e (MF1071)
                          - O1a1a1a1a1a1e1 (MF1074)
                      - O1a1a1a1a1a2 (CTS4585)
                  - O1a1a1a1a2 (MF1075)
              - O1a1a1a2 (YP4610/Z39229)
                - O1a1a1a2a (AM00330/AMM480/B386)
                  - O1a1a1a2a1 (AM00333/AMM483/B387)
                    - O1a1a1a2a1a (B388)
                - O1a1a1a2b (SK1555)
            - O1a1a1b (SK1568/Z23420)
              - O1a1a1b1 (M101)
              - O1a1a1b2 (Z23392)
                - O1a1a1b2a (Z23442)
                  - O1a1a1b2a1 (SK1571)
          - O1a1a2 (CTS52)
            - O1a1a2a (CTS701)
              - O1a1a2a1 (K644/Z23266)
        - O1a1b (CTS5726)
      - O1a2 (M110)
        - O1a2a (F3288)
          - O1a2a1 (B392)
            - O1a2a1a (B393)
      - O1a3 (Page109)
    - O1b (M268)
      - O1b1 (F2320)
        - O1b1a (M1470)
          - O1b1a1 (PK4)
            - O1b1a1a (M95)
              - O1b1a1a1 (F1803/M1348)
                - O1b1a1a1a (F1252)
                  - O1b1a1a1a1 (F2924)
                    - O1b1a1a1a1a (M111)
                      - O1b1a1a1a1a1 (F2758)
                        - O1b1a1a1a1a1a (Z24083)
                          - O1b1a1a1a1a1a1 (Z24089)
                            - O1b1a1a1a1a1a1a (F923)
                              - O1b1a1a1a1a1a1a1 (CTS2022)
                                - O1b1a1a1a1a1a1a1a (F1399)
                                  - O1b1a1a1a1a1a1a1a1 (F2415)
                              - O1b1a1a1a1a1a1a2 (Z24131)
                              - O1b1a1a1a1a1a1a3 (Z24100)
                            - O1b1a1a1a1a1a1b (SK1627/Z24091)
                              - O1b1a1a1a1a1a1b1 (Z39410)
                          - O1b1a1a1a1a1a2 (Z24088)
                      - O1b1a1a1a1a2 (F2890)
                        - O1b1a1a1a1a2a (Z24048)
                          - O1b1a1a1a1a2a1 (Z24050)
                        - O1b1a1a1a1a2b (Z24014)
                    - O1b1a1a1a1b (CTS5854)
                      - O1b1a1a1a1b1 (Z23810)
                        - O1b1a1a1a1b1a (CTS7399)
                          - O1b1a1a1a1b1a1 (FGC19713/Y14026)
                            - O1b1a1a1a1b1a1a (Z23849)
                              - O1b1a1a1a1b1a1a1 (FGC61038)
                        - O1b1a1a1a1b1b (CTS651)
                          - O1b1a1a1a1b1b1 (CTS9884)
                      - O1b1a1a1a1b2 (F4229)
                        - O1b1a1a1a1b2a (F809)
                          - O1b1a1a1a1b2a1 (F2517)
                  - O1b1a1a1a2 (SK1630)
                    - O1b1a1a1a2a (SK1636)
                - O1b1a1a1b (F789/M1283)
                  - O1b1a1a1b1 (FGC29900/Y9322/Z23667)
                    - O1b1a1a1b1a (B426/FGC29896/Y9033/Z23671)
                      - O1b1a1a1b1a1 (FGC29907/YP3930)
                      - O1b1a1a1b1a2 (B427/Z23680)
                    - O1b1a1a1b1b (Z39485)
                    - O1b1a1a1b1c (B418)
                  - O1b1a1a1b2 (SK1646)
              - O1b1a1a2 (CTS350)
              - O1b1a1a3 (Page103)
            - O1b1a1b (F838)
              - O1b1a1b1 (F1199)
          - O1b1a2 (Page59)
            - O1b1a2a (F993)
              - O1b1a2a1 (F1759)
                - O1b1a2a1a (CTS1127)
            - O1b1a2b (F417/M1654)
              - O1b1a2b1 (F840)
                - O1b1a2b1a (F1127)
              - O1b1a2b2 (CTS1451)
            - O1b1a2c (CTS9996)
      - O1b2 (P49, M176)
        - O1b2a (F1942/Page92)
          - O1b2a1 (CTS9259)
            - O1b2a1a (F1204)
              - O1b2a1a1 (CTS713)
                - O1b2a1a1a (CTS1875)
                  - O1b2a1a1a1 (CTS10682)
                - O1b2a1a1b (Z24598)
                - O1b2a1a1c (CTS203)
              - O1b2a1a2 (F2868)
                - O1b2a1a2a (L682)
                  - O1b2a1a2a1 (CTS723)
                    - O1b2a1a2a1a (CTS7620)
                    - O1b2a1a2a1b (A12446)
                      - O1b2a1a2a1b1 (PH40)
                - O1b2a1a2b (F940)
              - O1b2a1a3 (CTS10687)
                - O1b2a1a3a (CTS1215)
            - O1b2a1b (CTS562)
          - O1b2a2 (Page90)
  - O2 (M122)
    - O2a (M324)
      - O2a1 (L127.1)
        - O2a1a (F1876/Page127)
          - O2a1a1 (F2159)
            - O2a1a1a (F1867/Page124)
              - O2a1a1a1 (F852)
                - O2a1a1a1a (F2266)
                  - O2a1a1a1a1 (L599)
                    - O2a1a1a1a1a (Z43961)
                      - O2a1a1a1a1a1 (Z43963)
                - O2a1a1a1b (F854)
                  - O2a1a1a1b1 (Z43966)
                - O2a1a1a1c (Page130)
            - O2a1a1b (F915)
              - O2a1a1b1 (F1478)
                - O2a1a1b1a (PF5390)
                  - O2a1a1b1a1 (CTS1936)
                  - O2a1a1b1a1a (Z43975)
                  - O2a1a1b1a2 (FGC33994)
        - O2a1b (M164)
        - O2a1c (IMS-JST002611)
          - O2a1c1 (F18)
            - O2a1c1a (F117)
              - O2a1c1a1 (F13)
                - O2a1c1a1a (F11)
                  - O2a1c1a1a1 (F632)
                    - O2a1c1a1a1a (F110/M11115)
                      - O2a1c1a1a1a1 (F17)
                        - O2a1c1a1a1a1a (F377)
                          - O2a1c1a1a1a1a1 (F1095)
                            - O2a1c1a1a1a1a1a (F856)
                              - O2a1c1a1a1a1a1a1 (F1418)
                              - O2a1c1a1a1a1a1a2 (Z25097)
                          - O2a1c1a1a1a1a2 (CTS7501)
                        - O2a1c1a1a1a1b (F793)
                      - O2a1c1a1a1a2 (Y20951)
                        - O2a1c1a1a1a2a (Y20932)
                  - O2a1c1a1a2 (F38)
                  - O2a1c1a1a3 (F12)
                  - O2a1c1a1a4 (F930)
                    - O2a1c1a1a4a (F2685)
                  - O2a1c1a1a5 (F1365/M5420/PF1558)
                    - O2a1c1a1a5a (Y15976)
                      - O2a1c1a1a5a1 (Y16154)
                        - O2a1c1a1a5a1a (Y26383)
                          - O2a1c1a1a5a1a1 (SK1686)
                    - O2a1c1a1a5b (FGC54486)
                      - O2a1c1a1a5b1 (FGC54507)
                  - O2a1c1a1a6 (CTS12877)
                    - O2a1c1a1a6a (F2527)
                      - O2a1c1a1a6a1 (CTS5409)
                      - O2a1c1a1a6a2 (F2941)
                  - O2a1c1a1a7 (F723)
                  - O2a1c1a1a8 (CTS2107)
                  - O2a1c1a1a9 (SK1691)
                - O2a1c1a1b (PH203)
            - O2a1c1b (F449)
              - O2a1c1b1 (F238)
                - O2a1c1b1a (F134)
                  - O2a1c1b1a1 (F1273)
                  - O2a1c1b1a2 (F724)
              - O2a1c1b2 (F1266)
            - O2a1c1c (CTS498)
          - O2a1c2 (FGC3750/SK1673)
      - O2a2 (IMS-JST021354/P201)
        - O2a2a (M188)
          - O2a2a1 (F2588)
            - O2a2a1a (CTS445)
              - O2a2a1a1 (CTS201)
                - O2a2a1a1a (M159/Page96)
              - O2a2a1a2 (M7)
                - O2a2a1a2a (F1276)
                  - O2a2a1a2a1 (CTS6489)
                    - O2a2a1a2a1a (F1275)
                      - O2a2a1a2a1a1 (M113)
                      - O2a2a1a2a1a2 (N5)
                      - O2a2a1a2a1a3 (Z25400)
                  - O2a2a1a2a2 (F1863)
                    - O2a2a1a2a2a (F1134)
                      - O2a2a1a2a2a1 (F1262)
                - O2a2a1a2b (Y26403)
            - O2a2a1b (F1837)
          - O2a2a2 (F879)
            - O2a2a2a (F1226)
              - O2a2a2a1 (F2859)
        - O2a2b (P164)
          - O2a2b1 (M134)
            - O2a2b1a (F450/M1667)
              - O2a2b1a1 (M117/Page23)
                - O2a2b1a1a (M133)
                  - O2a2b1a1a1 (F438)
                    - O2a2b1a1a1a (Y17728)
                      - O2a2b1a1a1a1 (F155)
                        - O2a2b1a1a1a1a (F813/M6539)
                          - O2a2b1a1a1a1a1 (Y20928)
                      - O2a2b1a1a1a2 (F1754)
                        - O2a2b1a1a1a2a (F2137)
                          - O2a2b1a1a1a2a1 (F1442)
                            - O2a2b1a1a1a2a1a (F1123)
                              - O2a2b1a1a1a2a1a1 (F1369)
                          - O2a2b1a1a1a2a2 (A16636)
                      - O2a2b1a1a1a3 (Z25907)
                  - O2a2b1a1a2 (FGC23469/Z25852)
                    - O2a2b1a1a2a (F310)
                      - O2a2b1a1a2a1 (F402)
                        - O2a2b1a1a2a1a (F1531)
                  - O2a2b1a1a3 (CTS7634)
                    - O2a2b1a1a3a (F317)
                      - O2a2b1a1a3a1 (F3039)
                      - O2a2b1a1a3a2 (Y29861)
                    - O2a2b1a1a3b (CTS5488)
                  - O2a2b1a1a4 (Z25853)
                    - O2a2b1a1a4a (CTS5492)
                      - O2a2b1a1a4a1 (CTS6987)
                        - O2a2b1a1a4a1a (Z42620)
                      - O2a2b1a1a4a2 ( F20963)
                  - O2a2b1a1a5 (CTS10738/M1707)
                    - O2a2b1a1a5a (CTS9678)
                      - O2a2b1a1a5a1 (Z39663)
                      - O2a2b1a1a5a2 (M1513)
                    - O2a2b1a1a5b (A9457)
                      - O2a2b1a1a5b1 (F17158)
                  - O2a2b1a1a6 (CTS4658)
                    - O2a2b1a1a6a (CTS5308)
                    - O2a2b1a1a6b (Z25928)
                      - O2a2b1a1a6b1 (SK1730/Z25982)
                        - O2a2b1a1a6b1a (Z26030)
                        - O2a2b1a1a6b1b (Z26010)
                      - O2a2b1a1a6b2 (A9462)
                      - O2a2b1a1a6b3 (B456)
                  - O2a2b1a1a7 (YP4864)
                    - O2a2b1a1a7a (Z44068)
                      - O2a2b1a1a7a1 (F5525/SK1748)
                    - O2a2b1a1a7b (Z44071)
                  - O2a2b1a1a8 (Z44091)
                    - O2a2b1a1a8a (Z44092)
                - O2a2b1a1b (CTS4960)
              - O2a2b1a2 (F114)
                - O2a2b1a2a (F79)
                  - O2a2b1a2a1 (F46/Y15)
                    - O2a2b1a2a1a (FGC16847/Z26091)
                      - O2a2b1a2a1a1 (F48)
                        - O2a2b1a2a1a1a (F152)
                          - O2a2b1a2a1a1a1 (F2505)
                        - O2a2b1a2a1a1b (CTS3149)
                      - O2a2b1a2a1a2 (F242)
                        - O2a2b1a2a1a2a (CTS4266)
                          - O2a2b1a2a1a2a1 (Z26108)
                            - O2a2b1a2a1a2a1a (F2173)
                      - O2a2b1a2a1a3 (F2887)
                        - O2a2b1a2a1a3a (F3607)
                          - O2a2b1a2a1a3a1 (F3525)
                        - O2a2b1a2a1a3b (CTS3763)
                          - O2a2b1a2a1a3b1 (A9472)
                          - O2a2b1a2a1a3b2 (FGC16863/Y7110)
                            - O2a2b1a2a1a3b2a (L1360)
                              - O2a2b1a2a1a3b2a1 (FGC16889)
                            - O2a2b1a2a1a3b2b (SK1768/Y7112/Z26257)
                              - O2a2b1a2a1a3b2b1 (F4249)
                                - O2a2b1a2a1a3b2b1a (FGC23868)
                              - O2a2b1a2a1a3b2b2 (CTS335)
                    - O2a2b1a2a1b (CTS53)
                      - O2a2b1a2a1b1 (CTS6373)
                        - O2a2b1a2a1b1a (A9473)
                    - O2a2b1a2a1c (F3386)
                    - O2a2b1a2a1d (Y29828)
                      - O2a2b1a2a1d1 (F735)
                        - O2a2b1a2a1d1a (FGC34973)
                        - O2a2b1a2a1d1b (F1739)
                - O2a2b1a2b (F743)
                  - O2a2b1a2b1 (CTS8481)
                    - O2a2b1a2b1a (CTS4325)
                      - O2a2b1a2b1a1 (A16629)
                      - O2a2b1a2b1a2 (CTS682)
                  - O2a2b1a2b2 (F748)
                    - O2a2b1a2b2a (F728)
                - O2a2b1a2c (Page101)
          - O2a2b2 (AM01822/F3223)
            - O2a2b2a (AM01856/F871)
              - O2a2b2a1 (N7)
                - O2a2b2a1a (F4110)
                  - O2a2b2a1a1 (F4068)
                  - O2a2b2a1a2 (SK1780)
                - O2a2b2a1b (F4124)
                  - O2a2b2a1b1 (IMS-JST008425p6)
                  - O2a2b2a1b2 (BY15188)
                    - O2a2b2a1b2a (F16411)
              - O2a2b2a2 (AM01845/F706)
                - O2a2b2a2a (F717)
                  - O2a2b2a2a1 (F3612)
                  - O2a2b2a2a2 (SK1783)
                - O2a2b2a2b (AM01847/B451)
                  - O2a2b2a2b1 (A17418)
                  - O2a2b2a2b2 (AM01756)
                    - O2a2b2a2b2a (B450)
                    - O2a2b2a2b2b (AM00472/B452)
                      - O2a2b2a2b2b1 (F18942)
                    - O2a2b2a2b2c (A16427)
            - O2a2b2b (A16433)
              - O2a2b2b1 (A16438)
                - O2a2b2b1a (SK1775)
                  - O2a2b2b1a1 (SK1774)
                - O2a2b2b1b (A16440)
      - O2a3 (M300)
      - O2a4 (M333)
    - O2b (F742)
      - O2b1 (F1150)
        - O2b1a (F837)
          - O2b1a1 (F1025)
      - O2b2 (F1055)
        - O2b2a (F3021)

== See also ==
=== Genetics ===
- genetic genealogy
- Haplogroup
- Haplotype
- Human Y-chromosome DNA haplogroup
- molecular phylogeny
- Paragroup
- Subclade
- Y-chromosome haplogroups in populations of the world
- Y-DNA haplogroups by ethnic group
- Y-DNA haplogroups in populations of East and Southeast Asia

=== Y-DNA O subclades ===
- O-47z
- O-M101
- O-M113
- O-M117
- O-M119
- O-M121
- O-M122
- O-M134
- O-M159
- O-M162
- O-M164
- O-M175
- O-M176
- O-M50
- O-M7
- O-M88
- O-M95
- O-MSY2.2
- O-P31
