= Haplogroup O-M117 =

Descendant branch of haplogroup O2a (formerly O3a)

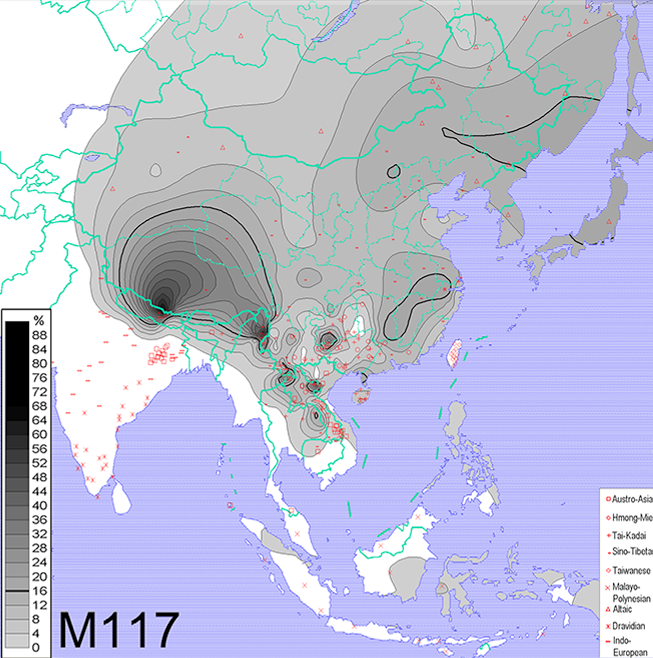
- Interpolated frequency distribution
- Possible time of origin: 18,203 [95% CI 16,626 <-> 19,783] years ago (Karmin 2015) 17,430 ybp 17,400 [95% CI 19,100 <-> 15,800] ybp (YFull)
- Coalescence age: 13,750 ybp 12,600 [95% CI 11,300 <-> 14,000] ybp (YFull)
- Possible place of origin: probably East Asia or Southeast Asia
- Ancestor: O-M134
- Descendants: O-M133
- Defining mutations: M117, Page23, CTS899/M1531, CTS1275/M1536, CTS3251, CTS5128/M1619, CTS6623/M1638, CTS11742/M1720, F141/M1564, F144, F235/M1587, F342/M1627, F373/M1636, F476/M1671, F579/M1692, F581, F584, F613/M1702, F649

Haplogroup O2a2b1a1-M117 or Haplogroup O2a2b1a1-M117 (also defined by the phylogenetically equivalent mutation Page23/F8/F42) is a subclade of O2a2b1-M134 (and also a subclade of haplogroup O2-M122) that occurs frequently in China and in neighboring countries like Bhutan, Nepal, and Korea, also found among Sino-Tibetan language speaking people.

O2-M117 has been detected in samples of Tamang (38/45 = 84.4%), Tibetans (45/156 = 28.8% or 13/35 = 37.1%), Tharus (57/171 = 33.3%), Han Taiwanese (40/183 = 21.9%), Newars (14/66 = 21.2%), the general population of Kathmandu, Nepal (13/77 = 16.9%), Han Chinese (5/34 = 14.7% Chengdu, 5/35 = 14.3% Harbin, 4/35 = 11.4% Meixian, 3/30 = 10.0% Lanzhou, 2/32 = 6.3% Yili), Tungusic peoples from the PRC (7/45 = 15.6% Hezhe, 4/26 = 15.4% Evenki, 5/35 = 14.3% Manchu, 2/41 = 4.9% Xibe, 1/31 = 3.2% Oroqen), and Uyghurs (2/39 = 5.1% Yili, 1/31 = 3.2% Ürümqi) (Xue et al. 2006, Gayden et al. 2007, and Fornarino et al. 2009).

Like O-M7, O-M117 has been found with greatly varying frequency in many samples of Hmong-Mien-speaking peoples, such as Mienic peoples (7/20 = 35.0% Mountain Straggler Mien, 9/28 = 32.1% Blue Kimmun, 6/19 = 31.6% Flower Head Mien, 3/11 = 27.3% Top Board Mien, 3/11 = 27.3% Thin Board Mien, 11/47 = 23.4% Western Mien, 6/33 = 18.2% Northern Mien, 5/31 = 16.1% Lowland Yao, 5/35 = 14.3% Yao from Liannan, Guangdong, 5/37 = 13.5% Zaomin, 5/41 = 12.2% Lowland Kimmun, 3/41 = 7.3% Native Mien, 2/31 = 6.5% Southern Mien, 2/32 = 6.3% Mountain Kimmun, but 0/35 Yao from Bama, Guangxi), She (6/34 = 17.6% She, 4/56 = 7.1% Northern She), and Hmongic peoples (9/100 = 9.0% Miao from Hunan, 4/51 = 7.8% Hmong Daw from northern Laos, 3/49 = 6.1% Miao from Yunnan, 1/49 = 2.0% Miao from Guizhou, but 0/36 Bunu from Guangxi) (Cai et al. 2011 and Xue et al. 2006).

In Meghalaya, a predominantly tribal state of Northeast India, O-M133 has been found in 19.7% (14/71) of a sample of the Tibeto-Burman-speaking Garos, but in only 6.2% (22/353, ranging from 0/32 Bhoi to 6/44 = 13.6% Pnar) of a pool of eight samples of the neighboring Khasian-speaking tribes (Reddy et al. 2007).

== Origin ==
The earliest attested genealogical split within haplogroup O-M117, that between O-M133 and O-M117(xM133), is estimated to have occurred approximately 12,600 [95% CI 11,300 <-> 14,000] ybp. However, members of O-M117(xM133) are quite rare among extant humans. O-M117(xM133) has been observed in 2.2% (1/46) of the CHB (Han Chinese in Beijing, China) sample of the 1000 Genomes Project. In commercial testing, O-MF1380 or O-CTS4960, which belongs to O-M117(xM133), has been found in China (Beijing, Henan, Shandong, Jiangsu, Anhui, Chongqing, Guangdong), Singapore, Indonesia, Saudi Arabia, and Japan. O-M117(xM133) also has been found in 1.5% (2/133) of a sample collected in Daejeon, South Korea and in 1.0% (6/573) of a sample collected in Seoul, South Korea. According to 23mofang, members of O-M117(xM133) comprise a subclade called O-CTS4960 (TMRCA 8,570 ybp), which is relatively concentrated in central, eastern, and northeastern areas of China and currently accounts for approximately 0.51% of the total population of males in China.

The most recent common ancestor of all extant members of the O-M133 subclade, which predominates among extant members of O-M117, is estimated to have lived in a significantly less ancient era: 7,600 [95% CI 6,400 <-> 8,900] ybp according to YFull, 7,455 [95% CI 6,514 <-> 8,500] years ago according to Karmin et al. 2015, or 7,500 or 6,400 years ago (depending on which estimate of the mutation rate is used) according to Poznik et al. 2016.

== Distribution ==
=== China ===
Haplogroup O-M117 or O-M133 has been found often in samples of Han Chinese from various parts of China: 10/34 = 29.4% O-M133 Hakka in Taiwan, 57/258 = 22.1% O-M133 miscellaneous Han volunteers in Taiwan, 4/19 = 21.1% Fujian (CHS), 12/60 = 20.0% O-M133 Minnan in Taiwan, 29/167 = 17.4% East China, 21/129 = 16.3% North China, 7/46 = 15.2% Beijing (CHB), 5/34 = 14.7% Chengdu, 5/35 = 14.3% Harbin, 9/65 = 13.8% South China, 7/55 = 12.7% O-M133 Fujian, 4/35 = 11.4% Meixian, 75/689 = 10.9% Pudong, 3/30 = 10.0% Lanzhou, 50/530 = 9.4% Chongming Island, 2/32 = 6.3% Yili, 1/37 = 2.7% Hunan (CHS).

Members of haplogroup O-M117 also have been found among various ethnic minorities in China, such as Tibetans (13/35 = 37.1%, 45/156 = 28.8%), Dai (13/52 = 25.0% CDX, or Chinese Dai in Xishuangbanna), She people (6/34 = 17.6%), Koreans (4/25 = 16.0% Koreans in the PRC), Hezhe (7/45 = 15.6%), Evenks (4/26 = 15.4%), Manchu (5/35 = 14.3%), Yao in Liannan, Guangdong (5/35 = 14.3%), Mongols (5/45 = 11.1% Inner Mongolian), Qiang (3/33 = 9.1%), Daurs (3/39 = 7.7% Daur), Hani (2/34 = 5.9%), Xibe (2/41 = 4.9%), Uyghurs (3/70 = 4.3%), Oroqen (1/31 = 3.2%), Buyi (1/35 = 2.9%), and Hui (1/35 = 2.9%).

Yan et al. (2014) have estimated that 16% of the present Han Chinese should be patrilineal descendants of a certain ancestor belonging to haplogroup O-M117 who has initiated a star-like population expansion dated to the Late Neolithic (5,400 [95% CI 4,100 <-> 6,700] years before present), which the authors have dubbed "Oα."

According to 23mofang, haplogroup O-M117 (TMRCA 13,750 years) accounts for about 16.27% of the total male population of China, with most members of O-M117 belonging to its O-F8 subclade (TMRCA 7,280 years), this latter subclade accounting for the Y-DNA of about 15.71% of all present-day Chinese males.

=== India ===
In a study of the DNA of Adivasi populations in the state of Meghalaya, Reddy et al. (2007) found O-M133 in 19.7% (14/71) Garo, 13.6% (6/44) Pnar, 11.1% (2/18) Nongtrai, 8.3% (5/60) Lyngngam, 6.9% (2/29) War-Khasi, 6.3% (4/64) Maram, 5.3% (1/19) War-Jaintia, 2.3% (2/87) Khynriam, and 0% (0/32) Bhoi. The Garo natively speak the Garo language, whereas all the other studied populations natively speak Khasic languages.

In another study that included populations in Meghalaya, Kumar et al. (2007) found O-M133 in 9.8% (9/92) Khasi and 9.1% (3/33) Garo.

A study of populations of northern West Bengal and Sikkim published in 2011 found O-M117 in 57.7% (15/26) Rabha, 47.4% (9/19) Mech, 43.1% (22/51) Rajbanshi, 41.7% (15/36) Dhimal, and 7.4% (4/54) Bengali from the northern panhandle of West Bengal and in 9.1% (1/11) of a sample of Lachungpa from Sikkim. O-M117 was not found in this study's samples of Kol (0/62), Santhal (0/51), Kharia (0/34), or Oraon (0/31) from the northern panhandle of West Bengal.

=== Japan ===
A study published in the year 2000 found O-M117 in 4.3% (1/23) of a sample representing Japan. In a study published by Chinese researchers in the year 2006, O-M117 was found with high frequency (8/47 = 17.0%) in a sample of Japanese that should be from Kagawa Prefecture according to the geographical coordinates (134.0°E, 34.2°N) that have been provided (Xue et al. 2006). However, in a study published by Japanese researchers in the year 2007, the same haplogroup was found with much lower frequency (11/263 = 4.2%) in a larger sample of Japanese from various regions of Japan (Nonaka et al. 2007). (More precisely, Nonaka et al. have found O-M117 in 1/12 = 8.3% of a sample from Shizuoka, 4/52 = 7.7% of a sample from Tokyo, 2/44 = 4.5% of a sample from Chiba, 1/2 of a sample from Gifu, 1/2 of a sample from Yamanashi, 1/3 of a sample from Hiroshima, and 1/6 of a sample from Aichi.) O-M117 has been found in 8.8% (5/57) of the JPT (Japanese in Tokyo, Japan) sample of the 1000 Genomes Project.

=== Korea ===
Between 11% and 15% of males in samples collected in South Korea have been found to belong to haplogroup O-M117 or O-M133 (20/133 = 15.0% Koreans in Daejeon, 70/573 = 12.2% Koreans in Seoul, 5/43 = 11.6% Koreans in South Korea, 33/300 = 11.0% O-M133 Koreans).

=== Mongolia ===
Haplogroup O-M117 has been found in about 5% of samples of Mongols in Mongolia: 4/20 = 20.0% NE Mongolia, 1/18 = 5.6% central Mongolia, 3/65 = 4.6% Outer Mongolian, 1/23 = 4.3% SE Mongolia, 3/97 = 3.1% NW Mongolia.

=== Nepal ===
Haplogroup O-M117 has been found in 84.4% (38/45) of a sample of Tamang, 33.3% of sample of Tharu of Chitwan and Morang, 21.2% (14/66) of a sample of Newar, and 16.9% (13/77) of a sample of the general population of Kathmandu.

=== Laos ===
In a study published in 2011, haplogroup O-M117 has been found in 7.8% (4/51) of a sample of Hmong Daw in Laos and in 5.1% (37/728) of a set of ethnic minorities who speak various Austroasiatic languages: 32.1% (9/28) Bit, 16.2% (6/37) Kataang, 14.0% (7/50) Mal, 13.7% (7/51) Khmu, 6.9% (2/29) Xinhmul, 3.3% (1/30) Alak, 2.94% (1/34) Inh, 2.86% (1/35) Talieng, 2.0% (1/50) Laven, 2.0% (1/50) Oy, 2.0% (1/50) So, 0% (0/28) Bo, 0% (0/32) Brau, 0% (0/32) Jeh, 0% (0/35) Lamet, 0% (0/35) Ngeq, 0% (0/38) Aheu, 0% (0/39) Suy, and 0% (0/45) Katu.

Kutanan et al. 2019 found O-F8/F42, which is currently considered to be phylogenetically equivalent to O-M133, in 25.0% (5/20) of a sample of Laotians from Luang Prabang and 5.0% (1/20) of a sample of Laotians from Vientiane.

=== Thailand ===
In a study published in 2014, haplogroup O-M133 has been found in 13.3% (10/75) of a sample of the general population of Bangkok and in 3.7% (1/27) of a sample of Akka from Chiang Mai.

Brunelli et al. (2017) have found O-M117 in 35.0% (7/20) of Shan, 22.4% (46/205) of Khon Mueang, 22.2% (4/18) of Mon, 20.0% (5/25) of Western Lawa, 17.6% (16/91) of Tai Lue, 16.7% (4/24) of Tai Khuen, 13.6% (9/66) of Tai Yuan, and 11.5% (3/26) of Tai Yong in Northern Thailand and in 31.6% (6/19) of Tai Yuan in Central Thailand. However, in the same study, haplogroup O-M117 was not observed in a sample of 25 Eastern Lawa in Northern Thailand.

Kutanan et al. (2019) have found O-F8/F42 (equivalent to O-M133) in 14.75% (131/888) of a pool of samples from Thailand, including 50.0% (9/18) Palaung in Northern Thailand, 38.9% (7/18) Shan in Northern Thailand, 33.3% (20/60) Khon Mueang in Northern Thailand, 31.0% (13/42) Karen in Northern Thailand, 28.6% (6/21) Nyahkur in Northeast Thailand, 23.5% (4/17) Kaleun, 17.1% (22/129) Thai (Siamese), 16.7% (5/30) Tai Lue in Northern Thailand, 16.7% (3/18) Nyaw in Northeast Thailand, 16.7% (3/18) Blang in Northern Thailand, 15.4% (4/26) Tai Yuan, 14.3% (15/105) Mon, 14.3% (5/35) Phuan, 11.8% (2/17) Soa, 11.8% (2/17) Tai Khün, 9.4% (3/32) Western Lawa, 8.3% (3/36) Black Tai, 6.5% (4/62) Lao Isan, and 5.6% (1/18) Khmu.

=== Vietnam ===
Haplogroup O-M133 has been found in 4/46 = 8.7% of the KHV (Kinh in Ho Chi Minh City, Vietnam) sample of the 1000 Genomes Project. Haplogroup O-M133 has been found in 1/24 = 4.17% of a sample of people in Hanoi, Vietnam. A study published in 2011 found haplogroup O-M117 in 1/15 = 6.67% Kinh and 1/12 = 8.33% Muong.

Macholdt et al. 2020 have found O-F8, which is currently considered to be phylogenetically equivalent to O-M1706 or O-M133, in 36.4% (12/33) of a sample of Hanhi from Mường Tè District, 22.2% (8/36) of a sample of Lachi from Hoàng Su Phì District, 14.9% (7/47) of a sample of Tay, 14.3% (3/21) of a sample of Phula from Xín Mần District, 12.9% (4/31) of a sample of Lahu from Mường Tè District, 8.3% (2/24) of a sample of Thai, 4.8% (2/42) of a sample of Kinh from Hanoi, 3.7% (1/27) of a sample of Giarai, 2.8% (1/36) of a sample of Pathen, and 2.7% (1/37) of a sample of Nung from Vietnam. All members of O-F8 among the Hanhi and Lahu of Mường Tè District belonged to the O-F2137 subclade. One Tay individual from Mường Khương District belonged to the O-F155 subclade and one Tay individual from Tràng Định District belonged to the O-F317 subclade. All other members of O-F8 belonged to the O-F8(xF155, F2137, F317) paragroup. Only one individual in this study (a Tay from Đức Trọng District) has been assigned to O-P164(xF8, F46, F4110) and therefore potentially might belong to O-M117(xF8/M133).

== Subclades ==
According to the ISOGG experiental tree, the subclades of O2ab1a1-M117 are shown below (Owen Lu et al. 2016):

- O2a2b1a1 (M117/Page23)
  - O2a2b1a1a (M133)
    - O2a2b1a1a1 (F438)
      - O2a2b1a1a1a (Y17728)
        - O2a2b1a1a1a1 (F155)
        - O2a2b1a1a1a2 (F1754)
          - O2a2b1a1a1a2a (F2137)
        - O2a2b1a1a1a3 (Z25907)
        - O2a2b1a1a2 (FGC23469)
          - O2a2b1a1a2a (F310)
            - O2a2b1a1a2a1 (F402)
              - O2a2b1a1a2a1a (F1531)
    - O2a2b1a1a3 (CTS7634)
      - O2a2b1a1a3a (F317)
        - O2a2b1a1a3a1 (F3039)
      - O2a2b1a1a3b (CTS5488)
    - O2a2b1a1a4 (Z25853)
      - O2a2b1a1a4a (CTS5492)
        - O2a2b1a1a4a1 (CTS6987)
    - O2a2b1a1a5 (CTS10738/M1707)
      - O2a2b1a1a5a (CTS9678)
        - O2a2b1a1a5a1 (Z39663)
      - O2a2b1a1a5b (A9457)
    - O2a2b1a1a6 (CTS4658)
      - O2a2b1a1a6a (CTS5308)
      - O2a2b1a1a6b (Z25928)
        - O2a2b1a1a6b1 (SK1730)
          - O2a2b1a1a6b1a (Z26030)
          - O2a2b1a1a6b1b (Z26010)
        - O2a2b1a1a6b2 (A9462)
        - O2a2b1a1a6b3 (B456)
  - O2a2b1a1b (CTS4960)

== Ancient DNA and Prominent Member ==
According to ancient DNA of various Erlitou/Xia era archaeological sites(Shimao, wangchenggang), highest rulers belong to same O-F402 clade. Some scholar further speculate that this branch originated 4,300 years ago and was part of the expansion of Oα in the late Neolithic period, possible Yu himself or one of archetypal figure of his story.reflecting the expansion of the Sino-Tibetan to Shandong and the Hubei in the late Neolithic period.
