= Haplogroup O-M268 =

Y-chromosome DNA Haplogroup O1b (formerly O2)

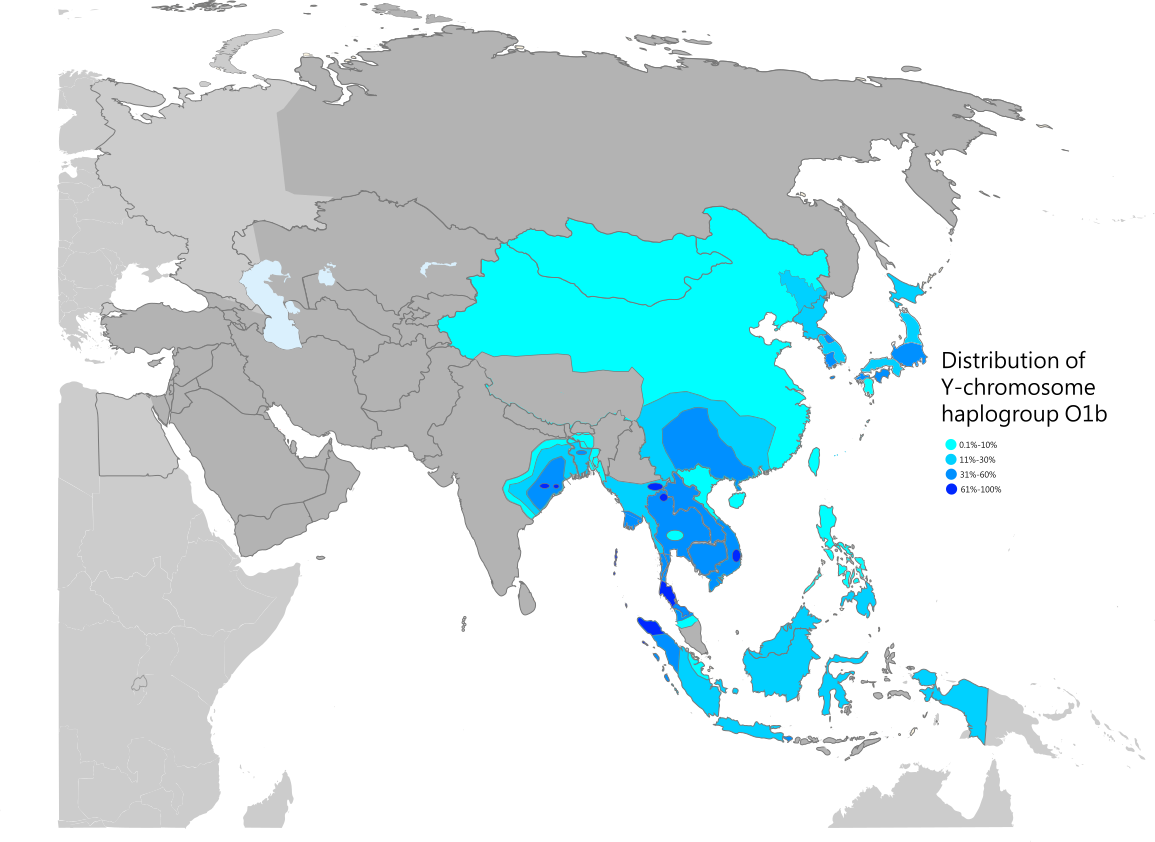
- Possible time of origin: 34,100 or 29,200 ybp 33,181 [95% CI 36,879 <-> 24,461] ybp 30,100 [95% CI 27,800 <-> 32,400] ybp
- Coalescence age: 31,108 [95% CI 34,893 <-> 22,844] ybp
- Possible place of origin: Southeast Asia or East Asia
- Ancestor: O1 (O-F265)
- Descendants: O1b1 (K18), O1b2 (P49)
- Defining mutations: P31, M268, L690/F167, F256/M1341, Y9038/FGC19644, L463/F330, M1461, F138, Y9317, FGC55566, F292/M1363, CTS4164, CTS6713/M1396, CTS5785/M1377, F435/M1417, F516, M1455
- Highest frequencies: Austroasiatic-speaking peoples, Tai peoples, Hlai, Balinese, Javanese, Japanese, Ryukyuans, Koreans, Malagasy

Haplogroup O-M268 (former name) is a Y-DNA that descends from O1 (O-F265), however, it is now referred to as O1b.

== Origin ==
The authors of a study published in 2011 have suggested China as being the early birthplace of O1b.

== Phylogenetics ==
=== Phylogenetic History ===
Prior to 2002, there were in academic literature at least seven naming systems for the Y-Chromosome Phylogenetic tree. This led to considerable confusion. In 2002, the major research groups came together and formed the Y-Chromosome Consortium (YCC). They published a joint paper that created a single new tree that all agreed to use. Later, a group of citizen scientists with an interest in population genetics and genetic genealogy formed a working group to create an amateur tree aiming at being above all timely. The table below brings together all of these works at the point of the landmark 2002 YCC Tree. This allows a researcher reviewing older published literature to quickly move between nomenclatures.

YCC 2002/2008 (Shorthand)	(α)	(β)	(γ)	(δ)	(ε)	(ζ)	(η)	YCC 2002 (Longhand)	YCC 2005 (Longhand)	YCC 2008 (Longhand)	YCC 2010r (Longhand)	ISOGG 2006	ISOGG 2007	ISOGG 2008	ISOGG 2009	ISOGG 2010	ISOGG 2011	ISOGG 2012
O-M175	26	VII	1U	28	Eu16	H9	I	O*	O	O	O	O	O	O	O	O	O	O
O-M119	26	VII	1U	32	Eu16	H9	H	O1*	O1a	O1a	O1a	O1a	O1a	O1a	O1a	O1a	O1a	O1a
O-M101	26	VII	1U	32	Eu16	H9	H	O1a	O1a1	O1a1a	O1a1a	O1a1	O1a1	O1a1a	O1a1a	O1a1a	O1a1a	O1a1a
O-M50	26	VII	1U	32	Eu16	H10	H	O1b	O1a2	O1a2	O1a2	O1a2	O1a2	O1a2	O1a2	O1a2	O1a2	O1a2
O-P31	26	VII	1U	33	Eu16	H5	I	O2*	O2	O2	O2	O2	O2	O2	O2	O2	O2	O2
O-M95	26	VII	1U	34	Eu16	H11	G	O2a*	O2a	O2a	O2a	O2a	O2a	O2a	O2a	O2a	O2a1	O2a1
O-M88	26	VII	1U	34	Eu16	H12	G	O2a1	O2a1	O2a1	O2a1	O2a1	O2a1	O2a1	O2a1	O2a1	O2a1a	O2a1a
O-SRY465	20	VII	1U	35	Eu16	H5	I	O2b*	O2b	O2b	O2b	O2b	O2b	O2b	O2b	O2b	O2b	O2b
O-47z	5	VII	1U	26	Eu16	H5	I	O2b1	O2b1a	O2b1	O2b1	O2b1a	O2b1a	O2b1	O2b1	O2b1	O2b1	O2b1
O-M122	26	VII	1U	29	Eu16	H6	L	O3*	O3	O3	O3	O3	O3	O3	O3	O3	O3	O3
O-M121	26	VII	1U	29	Eu16	H6	L	O3a	O3a	O3a1	O3a1	O3a1	O3a1	O3a1	O3a1	O3a1	O3a1a	O3a1a
O-M164	26	VII	1U	29	Eu16	H6	L	O3b	O3b	O3a2	O3a2	O3a2	O3a2	O3a2	O3a2	O3a2	O3a1b	O3a1b
O-M159	13	VII	1U	31	Eu16	H6	L	O3c	O3c	O3a3a	O3a3a	O3a3	O3a3	O3a3a	O3a3a	O3a3a	O3a3a	O3a3a
O-M7	26	VII	1U	29	Eu16	H7	L	O3d*	O3c	O3a3b	O3a3b	O3a4	O3a4	O3a3b	O3a3b	O3a3b	O3a2b	O3a2b
O-M113	26	VII	1U	29	Eu16	H7	L	O3d1	O3c1	O3a3b1	O3a3b1	-	O3a4a	O3a3b1	O3a3b1	O3a3b1	O3a2b1	O3a2b1
O-M134	26	VII	1U	30	Eu16	H8	L	O3e*	O3d	O3a3c	O3a3c	O3a5	O3a5	O3a3c	O3a3c	O3a3c	O3a2c1	O3a2c1
O-M117	26	VII	1U	30	Eu16	H8	L	O3e1*	O3d1	O3a3c1	O3a3c1	O3a5a	O3a5a	O3a3c1	O3a3c1	O3a3c1	O3a2c1a	O3a2c1a
O-M162	26	VII	1U	30	Eu16	H8	L	O3e1a	O3d1a	O3a3c1a	O3a3c1a	O3a5a1	O3a5a1	O3a3c1a	O3a3c1a	O3a3c1a	O3a2c1a1	O3a2c1a1

==== Original Research Publications ====
The following research teams per their publications were represented in the creation of the YCC Tree.

- α Jobling and Tyler-Smith 2000 and Kaladjieva 2001
- β Underhill 2000
- γ Hammer 2001
- δ Karafet 2001
- ε Semino 2000
- ζ Su 1999
- η Capelli 2001

=== Phylogenetic Trees ===
This phylogenetic tree of haplogroup O subclades is based on the YCC 2008 tree (Karafet 2008) and subsequent published research.

- O-P31 (P31, M268)
  - O-K18
    - O-CTS4040 Mainly found in Han Chinese and occasionally found in Chinese (Dai), Manchu, Thailand (Phuan, Tai Yuan, Thai), Vietnam, the Philippines, West Kalimantan, Qatar, Hazara, Japan, Korea; accounts for approximately 3.20% of all Y-DNA in present-day China
      - O-MF56251 Found in Thailand (Central Thai, Tai Yuan, Phuan), Vietnam (Nùng, Tày), and southern China (Yao, Zhuang, and Han in Guangxi, Guangdong, Hong Kong, Sichuan, and Jiangsu)
      - O-Page59 Found in approximately 3.10% of all males in present-day China, with some presence also in Japan, Korea, Vietnam, and other countries
        - O-CTS9996 Found in approximately 0.37% of all males in present-day China
        - O-Z24309
          - O-F417
            - O-CTS1451 Found in approximately 0.15% of all males in present-day China
            - O-F840 Found in approximately 0.40% of all males in present-day China
          - O-F4070 Found in approximately 2.20% of all males in present-day China
            - O-MF106398
            - O-F993
              - O-MF107014
              - O-MF61620
              - O-F1759
                - O-MF106881
                - O-CTS4936
                  - O-F3346
                    - O-MF17816
                    - O-F2064
                      - O-F3314
                        - O-Z24380
                          - O-F3323 Found in approximately 2.00% of all males in present-day China, with especially dense distribution in Taiwan, Shandong, Liaoning, Heilongjiang, Jilin, and Jiangsu
    - O-PK4
      - O-F838 Found in Han Chinese and in a specimen from medieval South Kazakhstan ascribed to the Turks; probably also present in Thailand (Kaleun, Phuan, Thai), Hanoi, Ambon, Ayeyarwady Region, and Xinlong County
      - O-M95 (M95)
        - O-CTS350
          - O-CTS350* Found in Japan
          - O-CTS10007 Found in Han Chinese in Hunan
        - O-M1310
          - O-F1252
            - O-SK1630/F5504 China (Shaanxi), Russia (Ryazan Oblast)
              - O-SK1636
            - O-F2924
              - O-CTS5854 Found in China (Han, Dai), Laos, Thailand, Japan, and the Philippines
              - O-M88 (M88, M111) Found in Vietnam, Laos, Thailand, Cambodia, Myanmar, China (Dai, Buyi, Zhuang, Li, Shui, She, Miao, Yao, De'ang, Bulang, Qiang, Tujia, Lisu, Achang, Nu, Lahu, Jinuo, Hani, Yi, Bai, Han), Taiwan (Han, Bunun, Yami), Java, Borneo, Malaysia, the Philippines
          - O-F789/M1283 Found in China, Vietnam, Cambodia, Singapore (Malay), Indonesia, Laos, Thailand, Myanmar, Bhutan, Bangladesh, and India
  - O-P49 (M176, SRY465, P49, 022454) Japan, South Korea, China, Mongolia, Vietnam, Micronesia
    - O-P49*(xPage92) Japan, South Korea
    - O-Page92
      - O-Page90 Japan (Hiroshima), Jilin
      - O-CTS9259
        - O-CTS562 Beijing (Han), South Korea, Japan (Fukushima)
        - O-K10/F1204
          - O-K10* Japan (Tokyo)
          - O-CTS10687 Japan, Mongolia
          - O-K7/CTS11723/47z Found in approximately 24% of Japanese males and with lower frequency in Korea and China
            - O-BY130355 Sichuan
            - O-K2/CTS713
              - O-K2* Japan (Tokyo, Aomori), South Korea
              - O-CTS203 Japan (Tokyo, Miyagi), Henan
              - O-K14
                - O-K14* Shanxi
                - O-M776 Japan (Tokyo)
                - O-Z24594
                  - O-Z24594* South Korea
                  - O-CTS56 Japan (Tokyo, Kumamoto)
              - O-Y178266 Japan (Tokyo), Beijing
              - O-Z24599
                - O-Z24599* Japan (Tokyo, Yamaguchi)
                - O-K473 Japan (Tokyo)
                - O-Y181118 South Korea (Busan), Hebei
          - O-K4
            - O-K3/F940 Hunan (Han), Jiangxi, Henan (Han)
              - O-F940* Hunan, Jiangxi
              - O-K481 Hunan (Han)
            - O-L682 Found in approximately 19% of South Korean males and with lower frequency in Japan and China
              - O-L682* Shanxi
              - O-K485
                - O-K485* Japan (Tokyo)
                - O-CTS723
                  - O-CTS723* South Korea
                  - O-A23652
                    - O-A23652* Japanese
                    - O-A23653
                      - O-A23653* Japanese, South Korea
                      - O-A23658
                        - O-A23658* South Korea
                        - O-Y165475 South Korea
                  - O-Y24057
                    - O-Y24057* Shandong
                    - O-A12448
                      - O-A12448* South Korea (incl. Daegu)
                      - O-PH40 Beijing (Han), Shandong, South Korea, Japan
                    - O-MF14220 South Korea
                    - O-Y26376/CTS7620 Japan, South Korea
                      - O-MF14346 South Korea
                      - O-Y26377
                        - O-Y26377* Japan (Okayama), Hezhen
                        - O-CTS1175 Japan (Kochi, Tokyo)

== See also ==
=== Genetics ===
- Genetic genealogy
- Haplogroup
- Haplotype
- Human Y-chromosome DNA haplogroup
- Molecular phylogenetics
- Paragroup
- Subclade
- Y-chromosome haplogroups in populations of the world
- Y-DNA haplogroups by ethnic group
- Y-DNA haplogroups in populations of East and Southeast Asia

=== Y-DNA O Subclades ===
- O-47z
- O-M101
- O-M113
- O-M117
- O-M119
- O-M121
- O-M122
- O-M134
- O-M159
- O-M162
- O-M164
- O-M175
- O-M176
- O-M50
- O-M7
- O-M88
- O-M95
- O-MSY2.2
- O-P31
