= Nyah Kur =

Nyah Kur may refer to:

- Nyah Kur language, a Mon-Khmer language spoken in Thailand
- Nyah Kur people, an indigenous ethnic group in Thailand related to the Mon
