= Pà Thẻn people =

Pà Thẻn
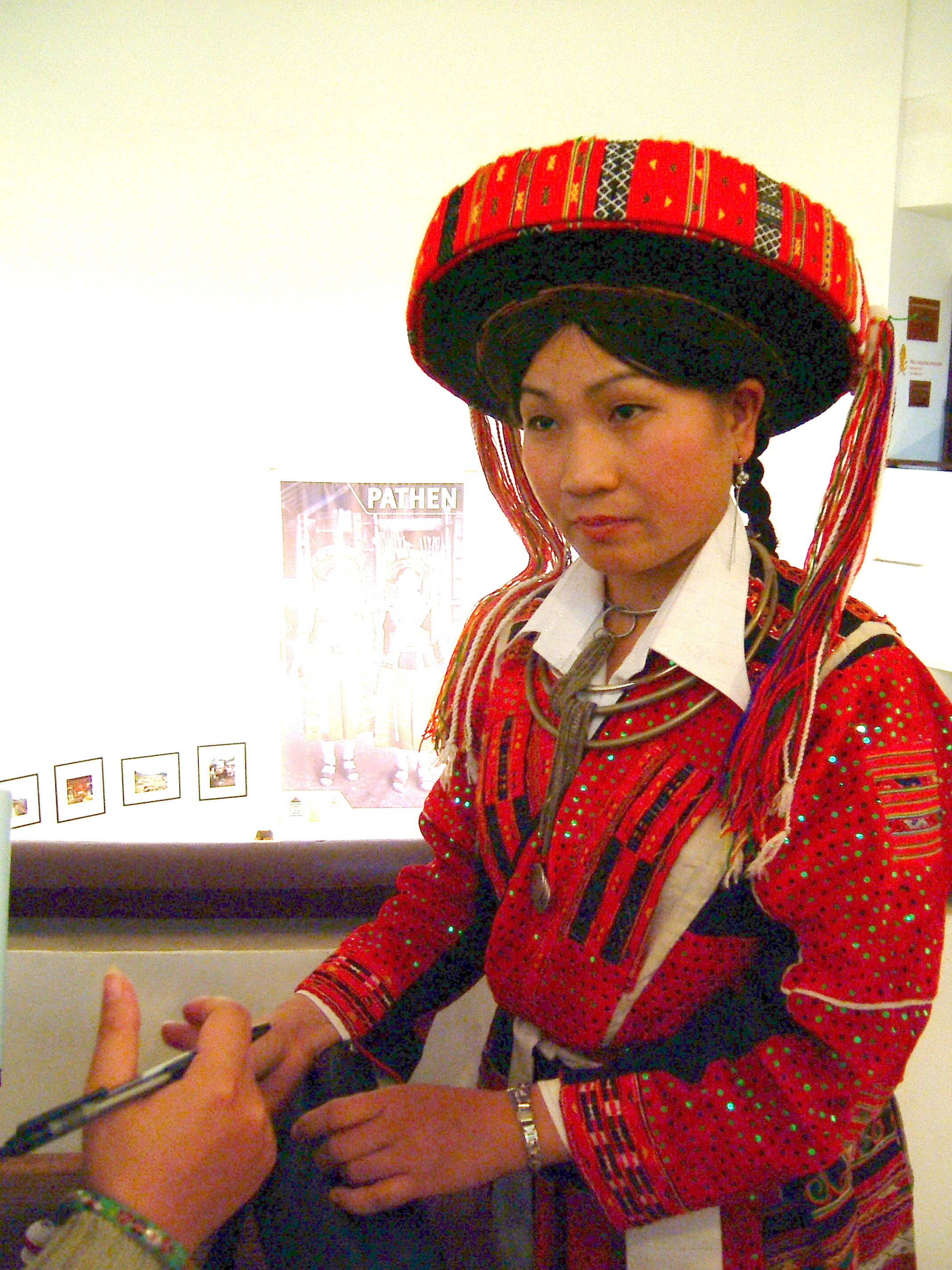
- A Pà Thẻn lady in her national costume

Total population
- Vietnam 8,248 (2019)

Regions with significant populations
- Vietnam : Hà Giang, Tuyên Quang

Languages
- Vietnamese • Pa-Hng

Religion
- Traditional religion • Mahayana Buddhism • Taoism

The Pà Thẻn (or Pá Hưng; Vietnamese: người Pà Thẻn) are Pa-Hng-speaking people classified as an ethnic group of Vietnam. Most Pà Thẻn live in Hà Giang and Tuyên Quang provinces, located in Vietnam's Northeast region. Their Pa-Hng language belongs to the Hmong–Mien language family.

In 2019, there are 8,248 Pà Thẻn living in Vietnam.

== Subsistence ==
Before 1970, the Pà Thẻn practiced slash-and-burn (swidden) cultivation (Vu 2013:70-71). The Pà Thẻn began to switch to wet-rice cultivation starting in 1970, and from 1993 onwards, most Pà Thẻn had given up slash-and-burn cultivation. Currently the Pà Thẻn grow various kinds of rice, including large-grained glutinous rice, long-grained glutinous rice, red glutinous rice, and non-glutinous rice varieties.

Traditionally, the Pà Thẻn grew rice, maize, cassava, sesame, cassava, taro, lettuce, calabash, luffa, colocynth, sweet gourd, beans, and Chinese peas as food crops. The Pà Thẻn also planted various spices such as basil, shallot, spring onion, garlic, ginger, crocus, red pepper, lesser galangal, citronella, eryngium, perilla, and marjoram. Sugarcane was also planted as well as fruit trees such as tangerine, guava, banana, grapefruit, lychee, longan, jackfruit, orange, and papaya.

In traditional Pà Thẻn slash-and-burn cultivation, crops that are to be harvested earlier are planted on the outside of the field, while later crops are planted in the middle. Seeds are sowed in the second lunar month, and harvests take place in the seventh lunar month or the late tenth lunar month. When rice ripens, pincers are used to cut each ear of rice.

The Pà Thẻn raise various animals such as water buffaloes, pigs, cattle, chickens, ducks, goats, and dogs (Vu 2013:86).

== Religion ==
=== Cosmology ===
The Pà Thẻn believe that the universe was created by the god Quơ Vo and the goddess Me Quơ O (Vu 2013:122-127). Pà Thẻn cosmology divides the universe into four parts.

1. The sky, where the sun, moon, stars, ancestors, God of Thunder, God of Lightning, Great Buddha, and others gods and spirits reside. The sky is ruled by the god Quơ Vo.
2. The earth, where human beings, plants, animals, ancestors, and various ghosts and spirits (soil, forest, stone, plants, etc.) reside. The earth is ruled by the goddess Me Quơ O.
3. The water, where there are various naiads, dragons, and gods of rivers and springs. The water is ruled by the goddess Me Quơ O.
4. The underworld, where Me Quơ Lê and various spirits live. The underworld is ruled by the devil goddess Me Quơ Lê.

Benevolent spirits include the ancestral ghosts, the stove god, the room god, the door god, the soil god, Quơ Vo, and Me Quơ O. However, these spirits can also cause disease and crop failures when upset. Malevolent spirits include ghosts of people who die sudden deaths, the Forest spirit, the Cliff spirit, and plant spirits.

Each god is worshiped using different rituals (Vu 2013:122-127).

- The stove god: Worshiping the Stove god takes an entire day, starting from 9 AM until 11 AM of the next day. Pigs, chicken, sticky rice, and cakes are offered.
- The room god: After a child is born for 3–4 days, or if the Pà Thẻn believe that the Room god needs to be fed, chicken, liquor, joss sticks, and joss paper are arranged in a tray and put in the bed of the mother. The priest then burns joss paper and attempts to placate the Room god.
- The kitchen god: A pig head, liquor, rice, joss paper, and joss sticks are offered at the main door.
- The village god: Many Pà Thẻn villages build shrines in the forest for their gods. Families bring meat, liquor, cakes, joss sticks, and joss paper to the priests who carry out the rituals, and the food is then eaten at the shrine. Strangers and women are allowed to join in the ceremony.

=== Ancestral worship ===
Most Pà Thẻn families have two altars dedicated to ancestral worship, namely a primary altar and a minor (subordinate) altar. Ancestral worship is carried out on the following occasions (Vu 2013:122-127).

- The 15th day of the 1st lunar month
- The 3rd day of the 3rd lunar month
- The 14th day of the 5th lunar month
- The 27th day of the 9th lunar month
- Name-giving ceremonies
- Entering a new house
- Funerals

== Fire Dancing Festival ==
The Pà Thẻn for celebrate the Fire Dancing (or Fire Jumping) Festival from the late 10th lunar month to the mid-1st lunar month (Vu 2013:130-131). A priest (sorcerer) plays the tầy nhậy, a wooden plank about 30 centimeters (1 ft) wide and 1 meter (3 ft) long that is played using a small bamboo stick and balanced by an iron ring (Vu 2013:169). Five to seven dancers usually participate. The priest calls out the following gods to induce the dancers into trances.

- Hông Lơ Cho
- Vù Lơ Chí
- Psi Lơ Chí
- Me Lơ Chí
- Pa Lơ Chí
- Ơ Lơ Chí
- Pu Lơ Chí
- Pọ Lơ Chí
- Xí Ca Dình
- Co Tả Chồng Di (Fire God)
