= Hoàng Su Phì district =

Coordinates: 23.667°N 104.667°E

Hoàng Su Phì district Huyện Hoàng Su Phì
- Rural District
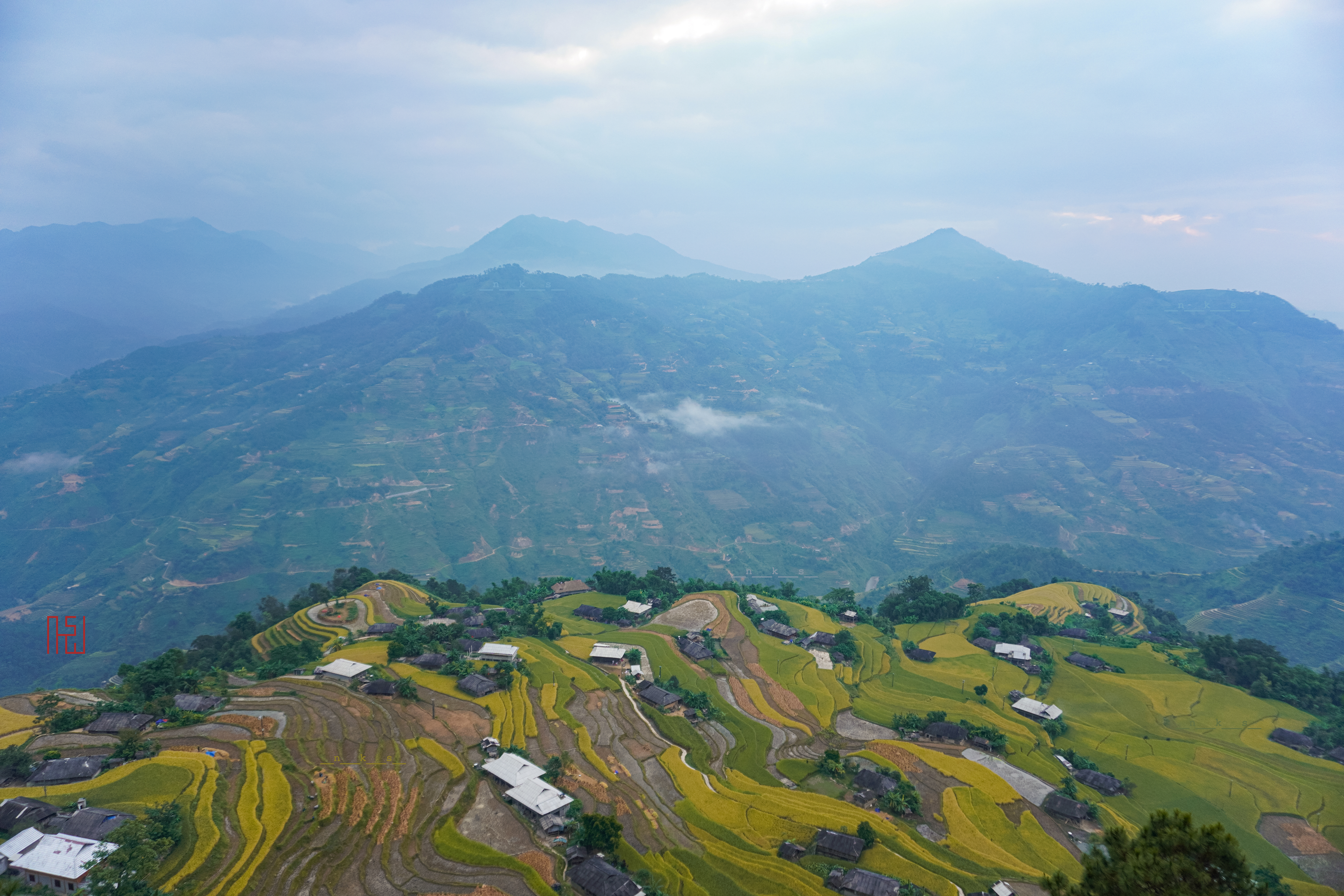
- Rice terraces in Phùng village.

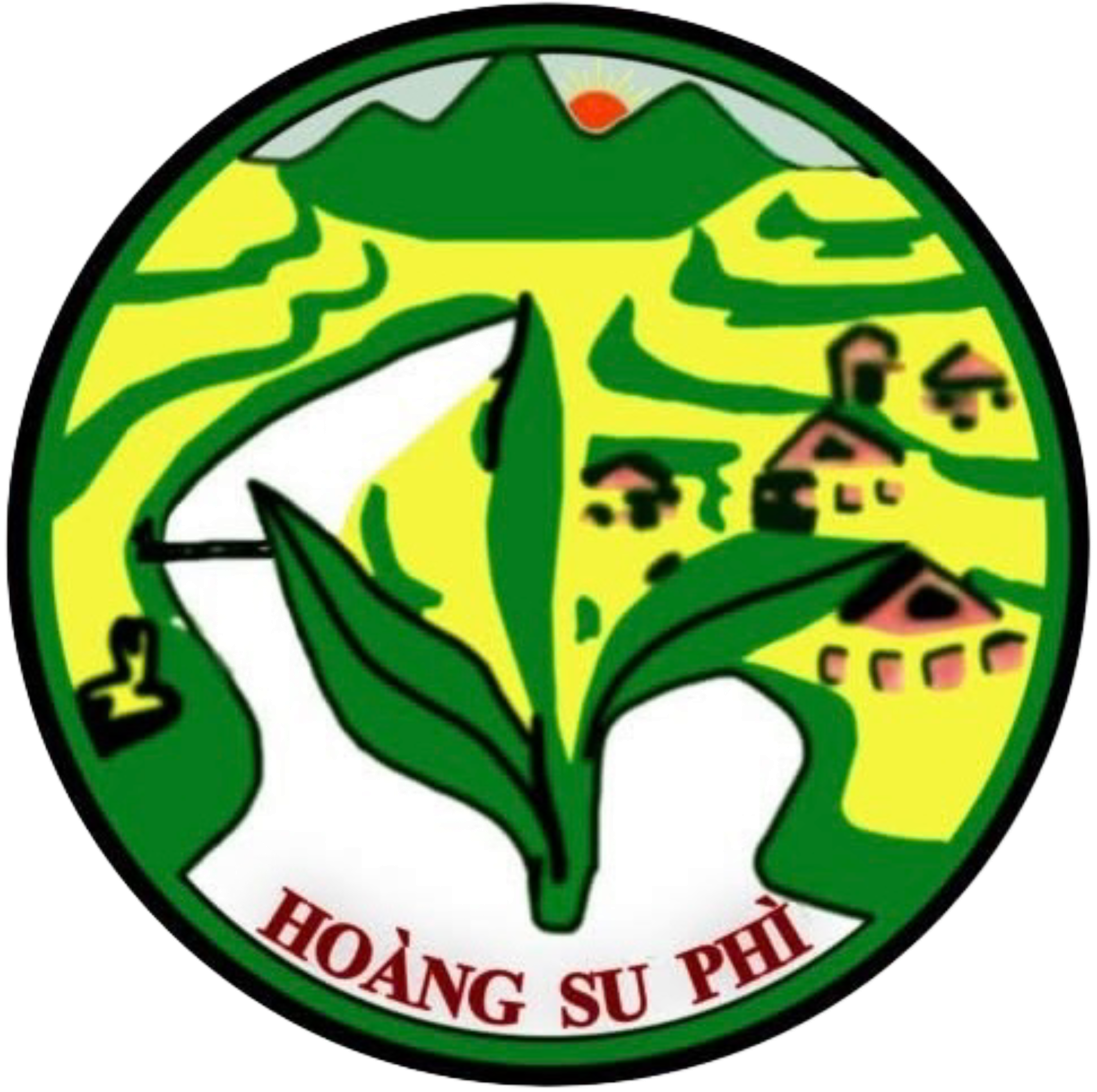
- Seal
- Interactive map of Hoàng Su Phì district
- Country: Vietnam
- Region: Northeast
- Province: Hà Giang
- Existence: 18th century to August 30, 2025
- Central hall: Vinh Quang township

Government
  - Type: Rural district

Area
  - Total: 629 km^{2} (243 sq mi)

Population (2019)
  - Total: 66,683
  - Density: 106/km^{2} (275/sq mi)
- Time zone: UTC+7 (Indochina Time)
- ZIP code: 20600

Hoàng Su Phì is a former rural district of Hà Giang province in the Northeast region of Vietnam.

== History ==
Its name Hoàng Su Phì or Hoàng Thụ Bì means "the yellow barkes" from Hmong language. It indicates the woods of weeping cypress, which is a local specialty.

According to many folk legends and historical records, this mountainous area has no name in the past and was the dispute location of many powerful families in the Sino-Vietnamese border.

After becoming officially a part of Annam from the 18th century under the consent of the Qing Dynasty, this land almost existed as the property of Vàng family.

After the Vietminh government took over Hoàng Su Phì in 1955, the population was still very low density. The situation of child marriage and incest has caused the erosion of the quality of the population.

Since the 1980s, a migration movement has been launched in the Red River Delta to resolve the economic downturn in urban and also help restore the population in the border area. An afforestation program by UNICEF and Vietnamese government's sponsor has soon turned Hoàng Su Phì into the most valuable wooden material address in the Northern Vietnam.

Until the early 2020s, most residents in this area were descendants of agricultural and forestry engineers, that is, those who left poor villages from Hanoi or Nam Định to reclaim in the 1980-90s.

== Geography ==
As of 2019 the district had a population of 66,683. The district covers an area of 629 km^{2} (243 sq mi). The district capital lies at Vinh Quang. Hoàng Su Phì is famous for its rice field terraces, especially on the road between Hoàng Su Phì and Xín Mần, where those terraces are classified as a National Heritage by the Vietnamese Government.

=== Administration ===
Hoàng Su Phì District consists of the district capital, Vinh Quang, and 24 communes : Bản Luốc, Bản Máy, Bản Nhùng, Bản Péo, Bản Phùng, Chiến Phố, Đản Ván, Hồ Thầu, Nam Sơn, Nàng Đôn, Nậm Dịch, Nậm Khòa, Nậm Ty, Ngàm Đăng Vài, Pố Lồ, Pờ Ly Ngài, Sán Xả Hồ, Tả Sử Choóng, Tân Tiến, Thàng Tín, Thèn Chu Phìn, Thông Nguyên, Tụ Nhân and Túng Sán.

=== Climate ===
Climate data for Hoàng Su Phì, elevation 553 m (1,814 ft)
Month	Jan	Feb	Mar	Apr	May	Jun	Jul	Aug	Sep	Oct	Nov	Dec	Year
Record high °C (°F)	30.9 (87.6)	35.4 (95.7)	38.0 (100.4)	38.2 (100.8)	39.9 (103.8)	38.5 (101.3)	36.9 (98.4)	37.3 (99.1)	37.0 (98.6)	34.0 (93.2)	33.1 (91.6)	30.3 (86.5)	39.9 (103.8)
Mean daily maximum °C (°F)	19.2 (66.6)	21.2 (70.2)	24.9 (76.8)	28.5 (83.3)	30.8 (87.4)	31.3 (88.3)	31.2 (88.2)	31.3 (88.3)	30.3 (86.5)	27.4 (81.3)	24.3 (75.7)	20.9 (69.6)	26.8 (80.2)
Daily mean °C (°F)	14.5 (58.1)	16.3 (61.3)	19.4 (66.9)	23.1 (73.6)	25.4 (77.7)	26.4 (79.5)	26.2 (79.2)	25.9 (78.6)	24.6 (76.3)	22.1 (71.8)	18.7 (65.7)	15.3 (59.5)	21.5 (70.7)
Mean daily minimum °C (°F)	11.6 (52.9)	13.1 (55.6)	16.1 (61.0)	19.4 (66.9)	21.7 (71.1)	23.0 (73.4)	23.1 (73.6)	22.6 (72.7)	21.3 (70.3)	19.0 (66.2)	15.4 (59.7)	12.1 (53.8)	18.2 (64.8)
Record low °C (°F)	0.2 (32.4)	2.9 (37.2)	3.7 (38.7)	9.4 (48.9)	13.7 (56.7)	15.7 (60.3)	17.7 (63.9)	17.8 (64.0)	13.2 (55.8)	7.9 (46.2)	4.4 (39.9)	−0.1 (31.8)	−0.1 (31.8)
Average precipitation mm (inches)	21.4 (0.84)	19.2 (0.76)	47.7 (1.88)	93.6 (3.69)	186.2 (7.33)	276.4 (10.88)	356.3 (14.03)	322.5 (12.70)	163.7 (6.44)	103.3 (4.07)	50.6 (1.99)	22.0 (0.87)	1,668.8 (65.70)
Average rainy days	6.1	5.6	6.6	10.8	15.5	19.2	22.5	21.3	14.8	12.1	8.0	5.0	147.9
Average relative humidity (%)	81.1	79.4	77.6	77.0	77.3	81.1	83.4	83.9	82.9	82.4	81.3	80.9	80.7
Mean monthly sunshine hours	89.8	89.4	132.4	165.2	175.0	145.1	152.4	164.0	150.7	122.6	121.4	112.3	1,622.6
Source: Vietnam Institute for Building Science and Technology
