= Thái people (Vietnam) =

Collective term for various Tai ethnic groups in Vietnam

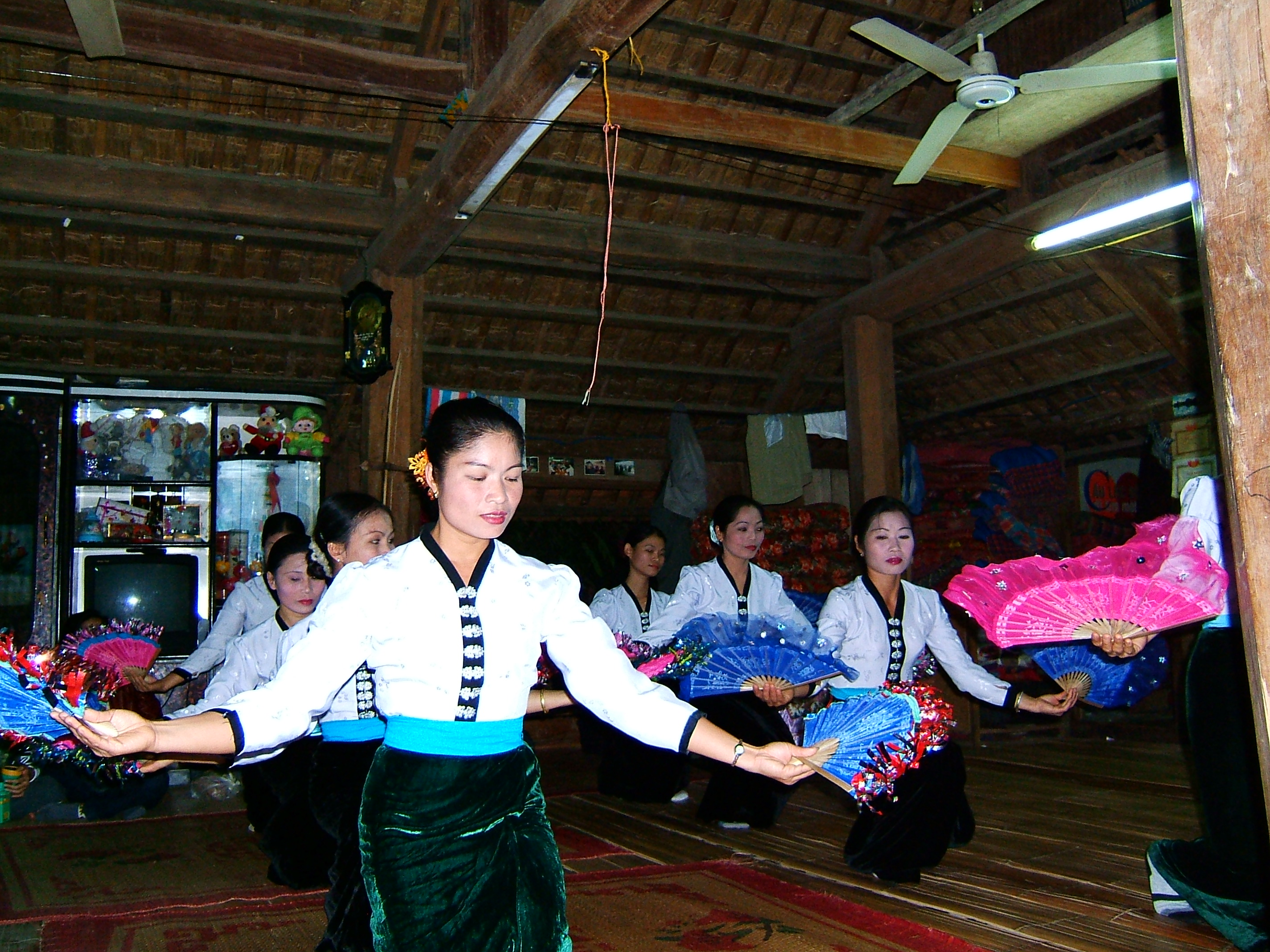
Thai people in Lac village, Hòa Bình province.

Thái people (Vietnamese: người Thái), also known as Táy people, or Thảy people, are recognized by the Vietnamese government as one of Vietnam's 54 ethnic groups. They are Tai ethnic groups that speak various Tai languages and use the Tai Viet script. They mostly live in the Northwest Region of Vietnam and are culturally and linguistically distinguished from other Tai peoples of Vietnam such as the Tày people and Nùng people, who are natives in the Northeast Region. In Vietnam, the Thái nomenclature is composed of several Tai groups, of which the main groups are the Black Tai (Tai Dam, Thái Đen), White Tai (Tai Don, Thái Trắng) and the Red Tai (Tai Daeng, Thái Đỏ). The Tai Lue people are officially classified as a separated group, called Lự. They mostly speak languages in the Chiang Saen branch of the Southwestern Tai languages. Thái people in Vietnam all originate from Yunnan. However, they (Tái minorities in Vietnam) are also different from the Thai people of Thailand although they are both related and speak Kra–Dai languages.

== History ==
The Tai peoples migrated south gradually from Yunnan to the region and also to Vietnam, Laos and Thailand during a period between the 7th and 13th century. They centered in the valley of Muang Thaeng (today's Điện Biên Phủ), a place strongly connected to the legend of Khun Borom. By the 11th century, the Vietnamese chronicle Đại Việt sử lược recorded the Black Thai had formed a polity in Sơn La called Ngưu Hống (Chinese: Heishui). The kingdom was conquered by the Lê dynasty and incorporated into Dai Viet's territory in the 15th century.

Like in other Tai societies, the core social units of the Thái in Vietnam were the village (ban) and the chiefdom (mueang, Vietnamese: mường), each consisting of several villages and ruled by a Chao lord. The Thái mainly settled in valleys alongside the course of rivers and cultivate rice. A number of these mueang in the region grouped together and formed a long-term alliance, called Sip Song Chau Tai (Twelve Lands of Thai). This federation of Sip Song Chau Tai maintained political autonomy and had tributary relationship with the regional powers, such as China, Lan Xang, Siam and the dynasties of Vietnam.

In 1841, the Nguyễn dynasty established the town of Điện Biên Phủ in the Muang Then Valley as an administrative office (Phủ). This was done for more direct control of the region and to stop bandits who were involved in opium trade.

In 1888, Sip Song Chau Tai was incorporated into the French protectorate of Tonkin and became part of French Indochina. This was arranged by the French explorer and colonial representative Auguste Pavie who signed a treaty with Đèo Văn Trị, the White Thai lord of Muang Lay (Lai Châu) on 7 April 1889.

The White Thai fought alongside the French in the First Indochina War, against both the communist Viet Minh and the nationalist Việt Nam Quốc Dân Đảng (VNQDD), In 1948, the French colonial administration declared the Tai Federation (French: Fédération Thaï, Tai: Phen Din Tai, Vietnamese: Khu tự trị Thái) to be an autonomous region. The Federation was disbanded after the Battle of Dien Bien Phu and the Thái lord Đèo Văn Long went into exile in France.

== Distribution ==
The Tai Dam and the Tai Don mostly live in the provinces of the Northwestern Plateau: Điện Biên, Lai Châu, Sơn La and Hoà Bình. The Tai Daeng are found in western part of Nghệ An and Thanh Hóa province where they are a major ethnic group.

According to the 1999 General Survey, there were 1,328,725 Thái people in Vietnam. In Sơn La, they form a majority in the province (54.8%). They are the largest ethnic group in Điện Biên (38%) and Lai Châu (32.3%).

Other groups include the Phu Thai in Hà Tĩnh and Nghệ An (population: 200,000), the Tay Thanh (Tay Nhai), the Thai Yo and the Tày Đà Bắc in Hòa Bình province.
