= Nyah Kur people =

Indigenous ethnic group in Thailand related to the Mon

Nyah Kur
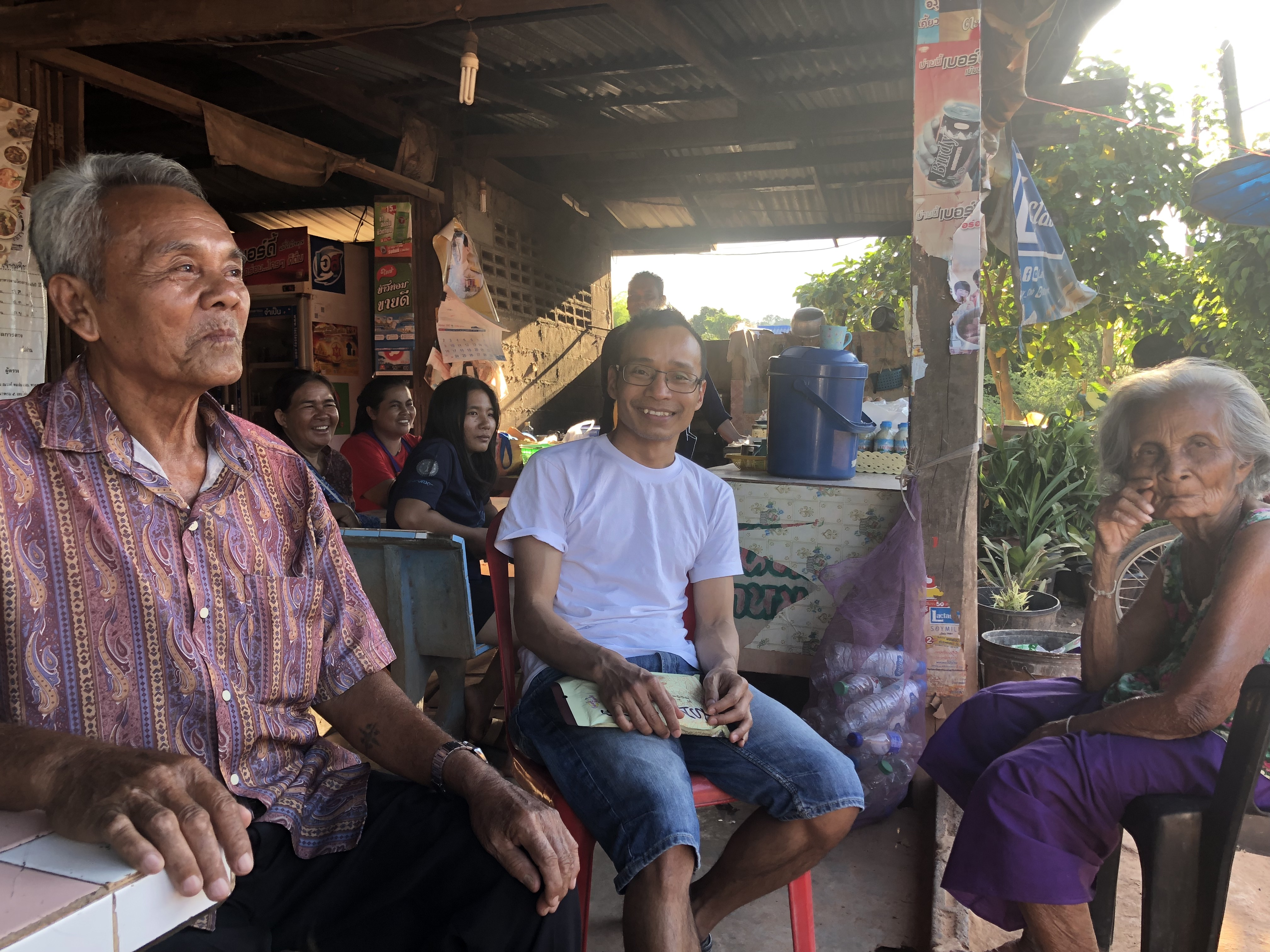

Total population
- 2000–6000

Regions with significant populations
- Thailand

Languages
- Nyah Kur, Thai, Isan

Religion
- Predominantly Theravada Buddhism, traditional Animism

Related ethnic groups
- Mon, Khmer, Kuy and other Austroasiatic people of Southeast Asia.

The Nyah Kur (ญัฮกุร; known in Thai as ชาวบน, Chao Bon or ชาวดง, Chao Dong ; Mon : ဂကူညးဂူ )are an ethnic group native to Thailand in Southeast Asia. Closely related to the Mon people, the Nyah Kur are the descendants of the Mon of Dvaravati who did not flee westward or assimilate when their empire fell under the influence of the Khmer when Suryavarman I gained the throne in the early 11th century.

== History ==
The Mon were believed to be one of the earliest people of continental Southeast Asia where they founded some of the earliest recorded civilizations in the region including the Dvaravati in Central Thailand, Sri Gotapura in Central Laos, Hariphunchai in Northern Thailand and the Thaton Kingdom. Dvaravati was among the first to receive Theravada missionaries from Sri Lanka in contrast to Hindu contemporaries, the Khmers and Chams. The Mon adapted the Pallava script to their language and the oldest Mon script was found in a cave in modern Saraburi dating around 550 AD. At the turn of the first millennium, the Mon came under constant pressure due to the Tai migrations from the north and Khmer invasions from the east. When Suryavarman I, the Khmer heir to the throne of the Lavo Kingdom, also became ruler of the Khmer Empire, the vast majority of the Mon of Dvaravati fled west to other Mon lands, were taken as slaves or assimilated to the new culture.

However a small remnant remained in the remote jungles of the Khorat Plateau. Little is known of their history. When they were discovered by western scholars in the early 20th century, it was variously assumed that they were part of the Lawa or Kuy ethnic groups. It was not until 1970 that their language was determined to be directly descended from Old Mon, and in fact, more similar to Old Mon than the modern Mon of their brethren in present-day Burma and Western Thailand. Although Nyah Kur and modern Mon are not mutually intelligible and the endonym Mon is unknown to the Nyah Kur, having remained isolated in the mountains between Central and Northeastern Thailand allowed the Nyah Kur to maintain their own ethnic identity which developed independently from the Mon during the last thousand years yet in some respects shows remarkable similarity to modern Mon culture.

Today, the Nyah Kur live in small villages distributed in a north-south strip that crosses Phetchabun, Nakhon Ratchasima and Chaiyaphum provinces, the majority living in Chaiyaphum. The Thai refer to them as ชาวบน meaning "upper people" or "sky people". Their self-designation is Nyah Kur, which in the Nyah Kur language means "mountain folk" and in modern Mon translates to "hill plantation people".

== Language ==
The Nyah Kur language, as a direct descendant of Old Mon, is a sister language to the Mon language of Burma, the two of which constitute the only languages of the Monic branch of the Austroasiatic language family. A 2006 estimate places the number of speakers at approximately 1500 people with no monolinguals. The dialects spoken in Phetchabun and Nakhon Ratchasima have limited intelligibility with that of Chaiyaphum and are nearly extinct. Even in Chaiyaphum the language is spoken mostly among older Nyah Kur, while others prefer to identify as Thai and speak either the local Isan language or the national Thai standard. Nyah Kur no longer has its own script and when written, the Thai alphabet is used. In 1984, a Nyah Kur-Thai-English dictionary was published.

== Culture ==
The Nyah Kur people possess extensive traditional knowledge related to forests, wildlife, native plants, and herbal medicine. Their way of life has historically been closely tied to the natural environment, with local knowledge systems playing an important role in subsistence and cultural practices.

A distinctive element of Nyah Kur culture is their traditional vocal performance known as "Pah Re Re," a form of sung poetry characterized by melodic ornamentation. The songs, performed in the Nyah Kur language, typically describe the beauty of nature, courtship between men and women, separation, and nostalgia for the past. This tradition is now critically endangered, with fewer than five individuals reportedly still able to perform it.

In recent decades, the Nyah Kur have faced increasing cultural and linguistic decline due to external influences and community dispersal. However, since 2005, there have been efforts to revitalize their cultural heritage, including the development of a writing system, the production of local literature, and the introduction of Nyah Kur language teaching in schools.

== Genetics ==
Genetic studies indicate that the Nyah Kur and modern Mon populations exhibit distinct maternal genetic structures, reflecting different population histories. Evidence suggests that present-day Mon groups in Thailand are genetically related to Mon populations in Myanmar, consistent with historical migrations during the early modern period.

Additional genetic evidence places the Nyah Kur within Austroasiatic populations and distinguishes them from neighboring Tai–Kadai-speaking groups, supporting their long-term presence in mainland Southeast Asia.
