= Kaleun people =

Ethnic group in Thailand and Laos

Kaleun
กะเลิง

Total population
- 15,700

Regions with significant populations
- Laos, Thailand

Languages
- Lao, Thai

Religion
- Theravada Buddhism

The Kaleun people (also called Laoeng) are an ethnic group of Thailand and Laos.

== Other names ==
=== Prefixes ===
- Tai Kaleun
- Lao Kaleun

=== Variations ===
- Kaleung
- Kalung
- Kalerng
- Kelung
- Khalong

== Ethnicity ==
The Kaleun are a Tai ethnic group. However, they may have been descended from Bru people who shifted to a Southwestern Tai language resembling Phuthai and Yoy, as the Vietnamese also refer to the Bru as Ka Leung. Chamberlain (2016) conjectures that the Kaleun may have originally been Vietic speakers.

== Geographic distribution ==
- Mukdahan Province of Thailand
- Nakhon Phanom Province of Thailand
- Sakhon Nakhon Province of Thailand
- Borikhamxai Province of Laos

== Religions ==
- Theravada Buddhism

== Language ==
The Kaleun typically speak Northeastern Thai as their primary language.
