= Haplogroup O-M119 =

Descendant branch of haplogroup O1a (formerly O1)

- Possible time of origin: 33,181 (95% CI 24,461–36,879) YBP; 34,100 or 29,200 YBP; 31,590 YBP; 30,000 (95% CI 27,900–32,200) YBP
- Coalescence age: 19,680 YBP; 17,500 (95% CI 19,400–15,500) YBP
- Possible place of origin: Southeast Asia or East Asia
- Ancestor: O-F265
- Defining mutations: M119
- Highest frequencies: Southern China, Thailand, Laos, Taiwan, Malay Archipelago, Pacific islands, Madagascar

In human genetics, Haplogroup O-M119 is a Y-chromosome DNA haplogroup. Haplogroup O-M119 is a descendant branch of haplogroup O-F265 also known as O1a, one of two extant primary subclades of Haplogroup O-M175. The same clade previously has been labeled as O-MSY2.2.

It is a pan-East Asian haplogroup, being found in eastern China (especially the Yangtse River Delta), mainland Southeast Asia, the Philippines, Indonesia, and even Siberia.

== Origins ==
The Haplogroup O-M119 branch is believed to have evolved during the Late Pleistocene (Upper Paleolithic) in Southeast Asia or East Asia.

=== Paleolithic migrations ===
Karafet et al. (2010) suggest haplogroup O-M119 was part of a four-phase colonization model in which Paleolithic migrations of hunter-gatherers shaped the primary structure of current Y-Chromosome diversity of Maritime Southeast Asia. Approximately 5000 BCE, Haplogroup O-M119 coalesced at Sundaland and migrated northwards to as far as Taiwan, where O-M50 constitutes some 90% of the Aboriginal Y-DNA, being the main haplogroup that can be directly linked to the Austronesian expansion in phase 3.

The Liangdao man, an 8,000 year old skeleton found on Liang Island in the Republic of China off the coast of Fujian, is believed to belong to Haplogroup O-M119, specifically under branch O-CTS5726.

=== Taiwan homeland ===
Li et al. (2008) concluded that in contrast to the Taiwan homeland hypothesis, Island Southeast Asians do not have a Taiwan origin based on their paternal lineages. According to their results, lineages within Maritime Southeast Asia did not originate from Taiwanese aborigines as linguistic studies suggest. Taiwan aborigines and Indonesians were likely to have been derived from the Tai–Kadai-speaking populations based on their paternal lineages, and thereafter evolved independently of each other.

The strongest positive correlation between Haplogroup O-M119 and ethno-linguistic affiliation is that which is observed between this haplogroup and the Austronesians. The peak frequency of Haplogroup O-M119 is found among the aborigines of Taiwan, precisely the region from which linguists have hypothesized that the Austronesian language family originated. A slightly weaker correlation is observed between Haplogroup O-M119 and the Han Chinese populations of southern China, as well as between this haplogroup and the Tai–Kadai-speaking populations of southern China and Southeast Asia. The distribution of Tai–Kadai languages in Thailand and other parts of Southeast Asia outside of China has long been believed, for reasons of traditional linguistic geography, to reflect a recent invasion of Southeast Asia by Tai–Kadai-speaking populations originating from southeastern China, and the somewhat elevated frequency of Haplogroup O-M119 among the Tai–Kadai populations, coupled with a high frequency of Haplogroup O-M95, which is a genetic characteristic of the Austroasiatic-speaking peoples of Southeast Asia, suggests that the genetic signature of the Tai–Kadai peoples' affinity with populations of southeastern China has been weakened due to extensive assimilation of the earlier Austroasiatic residents of the lands which the Tai–Kadai peoples invaded.

== Distribution ==
Haplogroup O-M119 lineages are found primarily in Southeast Asian populations of Malaysia, Vietnam, Indonesia, the Philippines, southern China and Taiwan (ISOGG 2010). High frequencies of this haplogroup have been found in populations spread in an arc through southeastern China, Taiwan, the Philippines, and Indonesia. It has been found with generally lower frequency in samples from Oceania, mainland Southeast Asia, Southwest China, Northwest China, North China, Northeast China, Korea, Japan, North Asia, and Central Asia.

A 2008 study by Li suggested that the admixture analyses of Tai–Kadai-speaking populations showed a significant genetic influence in a large proportion of Indonesians. Most of the population samples contained a high frequency of haplogroup O-M119.

The frequencies of Haplogroup O-M119 among various East Asian and Austronesian populations suggest a complex genetic history of the modern Han populations of southern China. Although Haplogroup O-M119 occurs only at an average frequency of approximately 4% among Han populations of northern China and peoples of southwestern China and Southeast Asia who speak Tibeto-Burman languages, the frequency of this haplogroup among the Han populations of southern China nearly quadruples to about 15-23%. The frequency of Haplogroup O-M119 among the Southern Han has been found to be slightly greater than the arithmetic mean of the frequencies of Haplogroup O-M119 among the Northern Han and a pooled sample of Austronesian populations. This suggests that modern Southern Han populations may possess a non-trivial number of male ancestors who were originally affiliated with some Austronesian-related culture, or who at least shared some genetic affinity with many of the ancestors of modern Austronesian peoples.

Some branches of O-M119 such as O1a1a1a1a1a1-F492 and its subclades are exclusive to Han Chinese populations and groups with whom they closely interacted. F492 underwent a major demographic expansion beginning in East China, where its incidence reaches 25-30% and spreading throughout the entire country. Specifically, O1a-M119 reaches 25.98% in Zhejiang, 23.47% in Jiangxi and 20.42% in Fujian in sampled Han populations.

=== Subclade distribution ===
==== O-M119 ====
This lineage is found frequently in Austronesians, eastern and southern Han Chinese, and Kra-Dai peoples.

This lineage is presumed to be a marker of the prehistoric Austronesian expansion, with possible origins encompassing the regions along the southeastern coast of China and neighboring Taiwan, and is found among modern populations of Maritime Southeast Asia and Oceania (Karafet 2005).

Haplogroup O-M119 Y-chromosomes also have been found to occur at low frequency among various populations of Siberia, such as the Nivkhs (one of 17 sampled Y-chromosomes), Ulchi/Nanai (2/53), Yenisey Evenks (1/31), and especially the Buryats living in the Sayan-Baikal uplands of Irkutsk Oblast (6/13) (Lell 2002).

==== O-P203 ====
O-P203 was found in 86.7% (52/60) of a sample from Nias, 70.8% (34/48) of Taiwanese Aboriginals, 28.4% (21/74) of Mentawai, 11.4% (73/641) of Balinese, 9.8% (6/61) of a sample from Java, 9.1% (36/394) of a sample from Flores, 9.1% (15/165) of Han Chinese, 8.3% (1/12) of a sample from Western Samoa, 8.2% (4/49) of Tujia from Hunan, 6.9% (4/58) of Miao from China, 5.7% (4/70) of Vietnamese, 3.3% (1/30) of a sample from the Moluccas, 3.1% (1/32) of Malaysians, 3.0% (1/33) of a sample from highland Papua New Guinea, 2.6% (1/38) of a sample from Sumatra, 2.3% (2/86) of a sample from Borneo, 2.1% (1/48) of Filipinos, 2.0% (1/51) of She, 1.7% (1/60) of Yao from Guangxi, 1.1% (1/92) of a sample from Lembata, and 0.9% (3/350) of a sample from Sumba.

In a study published in 2011, O-P203 was observed in 22.2% (37/167) of Han Chinese male volunteers at Fudan University in Shanghai whose origin may be traced back to East China (Jiangsu, Zhejiang, Shanghai, or Anhui), 12.3% (8/65) of Han Chinese male volunteers whose origin may be traced back to South China, and 1.6% (2/129) of Han Chinese male volunteers whose origin may be traced back to North China.

==== O-M101 ====
This lineage was observed in one individual from China (Underhill 2000) and another from Kota Kinabalu (Hurles 2005).

According to the website of Chinese genetic testing company 23mofang, O-M101 is a subclade of O-M307/P203 (O-M307 > O-F446 > O-F5498 > O-Z23406 > O-M101). Its TMRCA is estimated to be 4,850 years before present, and it is estimated to account for the Y-DNA of approximately 0.21% of all males in present-day China, with its distribution being relatively dense in Hunan, Hubei, Hainan, and Jiangxi. The O-M101 > O-A5863 > O-SK1573 subclade (TMRCA 3,400 ybp) has been estimated to account for the Y-DNA of approximately 0.08% of all males in present-day China, being relatively concentrated in South Central China and Southwest China at present. The O-M101 > O-A5863 > O-Y163909 subclade (TMRCA 4,080 ybp) has been observed in 16.7% (3/18) of a sample of Phuan males from Central Thailand.

==== O-M50 ====
This lineage occurs among Austronesian peoples of Taiwan, the Philippines, Indonesia, Melanesia, Micronesia, and Madagascar as well as among some populations of continental Southeast Asia and among Bantu peoples of the Comoros. It also has been found in a Hawaiian.

A study published in 2005 found O-M50 in 33.3% (13/39) of a sample of aboriginals in Taiwan, 18.2% (2/11) of a sample of people in Majuro, 17.1% (6/35) of a sample of Malagasy, 9.2% (6/65) of a sample of people in Kota Kinabalu, 9.1% (2/22) of a sample of people in Banjarmasin, 3.6% (1/28) of a sample of people in the Philippines, and 1.9% (1/52) of a sample of people in Vanuatu.

Kayser et al. 2008 found O-M110 in 34.1% (14/41) of a sample of Taiwan Aborigines, 17.7% (26/147) of a sample from the Admiralty Islands, 17.3% (9/52) of a sample from the Trobriand Islands, 13.5% (5/37) of a sample from the Philippines, 9.7% (3/31) of a sample from the Nusa Tenggara Islands, 3.8% (2/53) of a sample from Java, 3.0% (1/33) of a sample from the Moluccas, 2.5% (1/40) of a sample from Borneo, 1.0% (1/100) of a sample from Tuvalu, and 0.95% (1/105) of a sample from Fiji.

A study published in 2010 found O-M110 in 18.8% (9/48) Taiwanese Aboriginals, 13.3% (8/60) Nias, 8.3% (4/48) Philippines, 7.4% (4/54) Sulawesi, 6.3% (22/350) Sumba, 5.8% (5/86) Borneo, 3.3% (1/30) Moluccas, 2.3% (1/44) Maewo, Vanuatu, 1.6% (1/61) Java, 1.4% (1/74) Mentawai, and 0.8% (5/641) Bali.

A study published in 2012 found O-M110 in 4.6% (33/712) of males from the Solomon Islands.

== Phylogenetics ==
=== Phylogenetic history ===
Prior to 2002, there were in academic literature at least seven naming systems for the Y-Chromosome Phylogenetic tree. This led to considerable confusion. In 2002, the major research groups came together and formed the Y-Chromosome Consortium (YCC). They published a joint paper that created a single new tree that all agreed to use. Later, a group of citizen scientists with an interest in population genetics and genetic genealogy formed a working group to create an amateur tree aiming at being above all timely. The table below brings together all of these works at the point of the landmark 2002 YCC Tree. This allows a researcher reviewing older published literature to quickly move between nomenclatures.

YCC 2002/2008 (Shorthand)	(α)	(β)	(γ)	(δ)	(ε)	(ζ)	(η)	YCC 2002 (Longhand)	YCC 2005 (Longhand)	YCC 2008 (Longhand)	YCC 2010r (Longhand)	ISOGG 2006	ISOGG 2007	ISOGG 2008	ISOGG 2009	ISOGG 2010	ISOGG 2011	ISOGG 2012
O-M175	26	VII	1U	28	Eu16	H9	I	O*	O	O	O	O	O	O	O	O	O	O
O-M119	26	VII	1U	32	Eu16	H9	H	O1*	O1a	O1a	O1a	O1a	O1a	O1a	O1a	O1a	O1a	O1a
O-M101	26	VII	1U	32	Eu16	H9	H	O1a	O1a1	O1a1a	O1a1a	O1a1	O1a1	O1a1a	O1a1a	O1a1a	O1a1a	O1a1a
O-M50	26	VII	1U	32	Eu16	H10	H	O1b	O1a2	O1a2	O1a2	O1a2	O1a2	O1a2	O1a2	O1a2	O1a2	O1a2
O-P31	26	VII	1U	33	Eu16	H5	I	O2*	O2	O2	O2	O2	O2	O2	O2	O2	O2	O2
O-M95	26	VII	1U	34	Eu16	H11	G	O2a*	O2a	O2a	O2a	O2a	O2a	O2a	O2a	O2a	O2a1	O2a1
O-M88	26	VII	1U	34	Eu16	H12	G	O2a1	O2a1	O2a1	O2a1	O2a1	O2a1	O2a1	O2a1	O2a1	O2a1a	O2a1a
O-SRY465	20	VII	1U	35	Eu16	H5	I	O2b*	O2b	O2b	O2b	O2b	O2b	O2b	O2b	O2b	O2b	O2b
O-47z	5	VII	1U	26	Eu16	H5	I	O2b1	O2b1a	O2b1	O2b1	O2b1a	O2b1a	O2b1	O2b1	O2b1	O2b1	O2b1
O-M122	26	VII	1U	29	Eu16	H6	L	O3*	O3	O3	O3	O3	O3	O3	O3	O3	O3	O3
O-M121	26	VII	1U	29	Eu16	H6	L	O3a	O3a	O3a1	O3a1	O3a1	O3a1	O3a1	O3a1	O3a1	O3a1a	O3a1a
O-M164	26	VII	1U	29	Eu16	H6	L	O3b	O3b	O3a2	O3a2	O3a2	O3a2	O3a2	O3a2	O3a2	O3a1b	O3a1b
O-M159	13	VII	1U	31	Eu16	H6	L	O3c	O3c	O3a3a	O3a3a	O3a3	O3a3	O3a3a	O3a3a	O3a3a	O3a3a	O3a3a
O-M7	26	VII	1U	29	Eu16	H7	L	O3d*	O3c	O3a3b	O3a3b	O3a4	O3a4	O3a3b	O3a3b	O3a3b	O3a2b	O3a2b
O-M113	26	VII	1U	29	Eu16	H7	L	O3d1	O3c1	O3a3b1	O3a3b1	-	O3a4a	O3a3b1	O3a3b1	O3a3b1	O3a2b1	O3a2b1
O-M134	26	VII	1U	30	Eu16	H8	L	O3e*	O3d	O3a3c	O3a3c	O3a5	O3a5	O3a3c	O3a3c	O3a3c	O3a2c1	O3a2c1
O-M117	26	VII	1U	30	Eu16	H8	L	O3e1*	O3d1	O3a3c1	O3a3c1	O3a5a	O3a5a	O3a3c1	O3a3c1	O3a3c1	O3a2c1a	O3a2c1a
O-M162	26	VII	1U	30	Eu16	H8	L	O3e1a	O3d1a	O3a3c1a	O3a3c1a	O3a5a1	O3a5a1	O3a3c1a	O3a3c1a	O3a3c1a	O3a2c1a1	O3a2c1a1

==== Research publications ====
The following research teams per their publications were represented in the creation of the YCC tree.

- α Jobling and Tyler-Smith 2000 and Kaladjieva 2001
- β Underhill 2000
- γ Hammer 2001
- δ Karafet 2001
- ε Semino 2000
- ζ Su 1999
- η Capelli 2001

=== Phylogenetic trees ===
This phylogenetic tree of haplogroup O subclades is based on the YCC 2008 tree (Karafet 2008) and subsequent published research.

- O-M119
  - O-M119* China (Sichuan, Guizhou, Hubei, Shanghai, Zhejiang, Guangdong, Henan, Hebei, Liaoning, etc.)
  - O-Y14027
    - O1a3-Y144065/F1036 China (esp. Zhejiang, Fujian, Jiangsu, and Guangdong)
      - O-Y87942/MF38142 China (Zhejiang, Jiangsu, Sichuan, Chongqing, Hubei, etc.)
      - O-F1009 China (Shandong, Jiangsu, Hebei, Zhejiang, Beijing, Liaoning, Henan, Shanghai, Guangdong, Anhui, Shanxi, Jilin, Sichuan, Heilongjiang, Tianjin, Hubei, Shaanxi, Hunan, Gansu, etc.), North Korea (Pyeongyang), South Korea
    - O1a2-M50/M103/M110/F3288 Austronesia, China (Beijing, Macau), Thailand (Tai Lue, Yong, Tai Dam from Loei Province, Iu Mien, Isan, Mon, Siamese, Khon Muang), Laos (Lao from Luang Prabang)
      - O1a2a (F3288)
        - O1a2a1 (B392, Z38606, Z38607, Z38608, Z38609, Z38610, Z38611)
          - O1a2a1a (B393, Z38612)
    - O1a1-B384/Z23193
      - O1a1a (M307.1/P203.1, CTS3422, CTS4351, CTS5059, CTS6864, CTS7015, CTS8229, CTS8875, CTS8934, CTS9321, CTS11688, F31, F54, F89, F303, F333, L83)
        - O1a1a1 (F446, CTS4588, F560, FGC15381/K620/Z23389, K613/Z23387, K619/Z23388)
          - O1a1a1a (F140, CTS611, CTS3089, CTS3265, CTS3269, CTS11270, F157, F343, F424, F518, F571, FGC15382/Z23466, FGC15391/Y14275/Z23470, FGC15383/K625/Z23474, V68.2, Z23457)
            - O1a1a1a* Indonesia
            - O1a1a1a1 (F78, CTS4478) China (esp. Shanghai, Jiangsu, Zhejiang)
              - O-F23879 Philippines (Igorot from Mountain Province, Negros Occidental)
              - O-MF14277 China (Hunan, Sichuan, Guizhou, Jiangxi, Guangdong, Hubei, etc.)
                - O-MF14175 China (esp. Hunan, Sichuan, and Chongqing)
                - O-Y158653/ACT6252 China (Hebei, Jiangxi, Ma'anshan)
              - O1a1a1a1a (F81, CTS4910, CTS5709, FGC15392/Y14265/Z23469) China, Philippines, Vietnam (Pathen from Quang Bình District, Tày from Mường Khương District and Cư Jút District, Dao from Hoàng Su Phì District), Thailand (Pray, Isan, Mon, Central Thai, Northern Thai)
                - O1a1a1a1a* Guangdong
                - O1a1a1a1a1 (CTS2458)
                  - O1a1a1a1a1a (F533)
                    - O1a1a1a1a1a1 (F492, CTS2498, CTS2594, CTS4206, CTS5075, CTS11784, F619, K629/Z23478)
                      - O1a1a1a1a1a1a (F656, Z23481) Hubei, Jiangsu, Hong Kong, Beijing, Xishuangbanna
                        - O1a1a1a1a1a1a1 (A12440) Jiangsu, Anhui
                          - O1a1a1a1a1a1a1a (A12439)
                        - O1a1a1a1a1a1a2 (A14788, A14789)
                        - O1a1a1a1a1a1a3 (F65, F285, F469)
                        - O1a1a1a1a1a1a4 (MF1068, MF1069, MF1070)
                        - O1a1a1a1a1a1a5 (Z23482, Z23484, Z23485, Z23486, Z23487, Z23488, Z23489)
                      - O1a1a1a1a1a1b (FGC66168, Z23496, Z23505) Guangdong, Guangxi, Jiangsu
                        - O1a1a1a1a1a1b1 (CTS11553, Z23494, Z23496, Z23503)
                        - O1a1a1a1a1a1b2 (CTS409, CTS2613, CTS5922) Fujian
                        - O1a1a1a1a1a1b3 (Y146786, Y146790, Y146817) Hubei, Jiangxi
                      - O1a1a1a1a1a1c (Y31266, Y31267)
                        - O1a1a1a1a1a1c* Jiangxi, Fujian
                        - O1a1a1a1a1a1c1 (Y31261, Y31262, Y31263, Y31264, Y31265, Y31643) Sichuan, Cambodia
                      - O1a1a1a1a1a1d (A12441, A12442, A12443, Y69066) Henan, Anhui
                      - O1a1a1a1a1a1e (MF1071, MF1072, MF1073) Jiangsu, Anhui
                        - O1a1a1a1a1a1e1 (MF1074)
                    - O1a1a1a1a1a2 (CTS4585, CTS7624, FGC15395/Y14269, FGC15397/Y14272, FGC15398/Y13987, FGC15399/Y13986, FGC15400/Y13989, FGC15401/Y13988, FGC15402/Y13984, FGC15409/Y13985, FGC47328, FGC47336, Y14273) Jiangsu, Beijing
                - O1a1a1a1a2 (MF1075, MF1076, MF1077, MF1078, MF1079, MF1080, MF1081, MF1082) Jiangsu, Shanghai
            - O1a1a1a2 (YP4610/Z39229)
              - O1a1a1a2a (AM00330/AMM480/B386, SK1533, Z39230/YP4600, Z39231/YP4601, Z39232/YP4603, Z39233/YP4605, Z39234/YP4607, Z39235/YP4609, Z39236/YP4611, Z39237/YP4612, Z39238/YP4613, Z39239/YP4614, Z39240/YP4615, Z39241/YP4616, Z39242/YP4617, Z39243/YP4618, Z39244/YP4619, Z39245/YP4620, Z39246/YP4621)
                - O1a1a1a2a1 (AM00333/AMM483/B387, Z39247/YP4602) Philippines, Singapore (Malay)
                  - O1a1a1a2a1a (B388, Z39248/YP4604, Z39249/YP4608) Philippines, Singapore (Malay)
              - O1a1a1a2b (SK1555)
          - O1a1a1b (SK1568/Z23420, CTS8920, Z23430)
            - O1a1a1b1 (M101) China (Guizhou), Thailand (Phuan from Central Thailand), Kota Kinabalu
            - O1a1a1b2 (Z23392, Z23404, Z23440/SK1572) Vietnam (Colao from Hoàng Su Phì District), Thailand (Phutai from Sakon Nakhon Province, Siamese from Western Thailand and Eastern Thailand, Mon from Northern Thailand)
              - O1a1a1b2* Ho Chi Minh City
              - O1a1a1b2a (Z23442, F26575) Xishuangbanna, Hong Kong, Ho Chi Minh City
                - O1a1a1b2a1 (SK1571, Z39268)
        - O1a1a2 (CTS8423, CTS2915, F4084) China (Jiangsu, Shanghai, Zhejiang, Hubei, Sichuan, etc.)
          - O1a1a2a (CTS52, CTS11785, CTS5880) Japan
            - O1a1a2a1 (CTS701, K583, CTS4115, CTS6217) Vietnam (Lachi and Dao from Hoàng Su Phì District, Hanhi and Sila from Mường Tè District, Hmong from Điện Biên Phủ, Tay from Bình Liêu District), Thailand (Tai Lue from Northern Thailand, Shan, Suay from Northeast Thailand, Skaw Karen from Mae Hong Son Province, Isan, Phuan from Central Thailand, Black Tai from Loei Province, Mon, Northern Thai), Laos (Lao from Vientiane)
              - O1a1a2a1a (K644/Z23266, Z23269)
                - O1a1a2a1a1 (CTS10805, MF2376, CTS4829)
                  - O-CTS10805* Hunan
                  - O-Y148878 Guangdong, Sichuan
                  - O-MF2375
                    - O-MF2375* Hunan, Beijing
                    - O-MF6454 Singapore, Indonesia (Greater Jakarta)
                - O1a1a2a1a2 (Z23274, Z23275, F24990, F25139)
                  - O-Z23274* Shandong
                  - O-YP345 (Z7773, Z23304/Z23304.2) Xishuangbanna Dai
                  - O-Z23338/Y18196 Xishuangbanna Dai
                - O1a1a2a1a3 (CTS9421, CTS3144, CTS9476) China (Fujian Han), Taiwan (Yilan), Singapore, Japan
                - O1a1a2a1a4 (Y168496, MF167165/Y192368, Y168556, Y168502) China (Jiangsu)
              - O1a1a2a1b (Y157651)
                - O-Y156772 Shandong
                - O-CTS2118
                  - O-CTS2118* Singapore
                  - O-F16334 (CTS11040, CTS1992) Beijing, Guangdong, Liaoning
            - O1a1a2a2 (Y89818, MF16617)
              - O1a1a2a2a (MF14481, MF17536, MF16199) Zhejiang, Shandong
              - O1a1a2a2b (FGC66100, FGC66137, FGC66127) Hubei, Jiangxi, Zhejiang, Hebei, North Korea
          - O1a1a2b (F2444, F4243, Y137046) China (Guangdong, Jiangsu, Sichuan, Hubei, Zhejiang, Shandong, Jiangxi, etc.)
            - O1a1a2b1-Y137055 China (Found sporadically in Shandong, Hebei, Hong Kong, Hubei, Zhejiang, etc.)
              - O-Y137185 China (Guangdong, Sichuan, Jiangsu, Hubei, Shanghai, etc.), Hungary (Győr-Moson-Sopron)
            - O1a1a2b2-MF6180 China (Found sporadically in Shaanxi, Henan, Liaoning, Jilin, Heilongjiang, Shanxi), South Korea
              - O-F1056 China (Jiangsu, Shanghai, Zhejiang, Shandong, Anhui, etc.)
                - O-MF6458 China (esp. Jiangsu, Shanghai, Zhejiang)
                - O-MF6284 China (Found sporadically in Jiangsu, Shanghai, Henan, Sichuan)
          - O1a1a2c-SK1522 China (Jiangsu, Zhejiang, Shanghai, etc.)
      - O1a1b (CTS5726, CTS3085, CTS3400) China (Beijing, Fujian), Thailand (Siamese from Western Thailand), the Philippines (Manila, Agta), Singapore (Malay). Also found in "Liangdao Man", an 8,000 year old skeleton found on Liang Island in the Republic of China.

== See also ==
- Austro-Tai languages

=== Genetics ===
- Genetic genealogy
- Haplogroup
- Haplotype
- Human Y-chromosome DNA haplogroup
- Molecular phylogenetics
- Paragroup
- Subclade
- Y-chromosome haplogroups in populations of the world
- Y-DNA haplogroups by ethnic group
- Y-DNA haplogroups in populations of East and Southeast Asia

=== Y-DNA O subclades ===
- O-47z
- O-M101
- O-M113
- O-M117
- O-M119
- O-M121
- O-M122
- O-M134
- O-M159
- O-M162
- O-M164
- O-M175
- O-M176
- O-M50
- O-M7
- O-M88
- O-M95
- O-MSY2.2
- O-P31

=== Proportion of O-M119 in various samples ===
Population	Percentage	Count	Source	SNPs
Nias	100.0%	60	Karafet 2010	P203=52; M110=8
Nias	99.8%	407	van Oven 2011	M119
Taiwanese aborigines	89.6%	48	Karafet 2010	P203=34; M110=9
Mentawai	86.5%	74	Karafet 2010	M119(xP203, M110)=42; P203=21; M110=1
Aboriginal Taiwanese	83.4%	223	Tajima 2004	M119
Taiwan (aborigines)	78.0%	41	Kayser 2008	M119(xM110)=18; M110=14
Taiwan (aborigines)	71.8%	39	Hurles 2005	M119(xM50, M101)=15; M50=13
Taiwan (aborigines)	68.9%	74	Underhill 2000	M119(xM101)
Atayal	62.5%	24	Su 1999	M119(xM50, M110, M103)=13; M50/M110/M103=2
Utsat (Sanya, Hainan)	61.1%	72	Li 2013	M119=44
Gelao	60.0%	30		M119(xM110)=18
Gelong (Hainan)	57.7%	78		M119(xM110)=45
Tagalog (Philippine subgroup)	46.0%	50	Tajima 2004	M119
Kota Kinabalu	42.1%	19		M119(xM50, M110, M103)=6; M50/M110/M103=2
Philippines	41.0%	39	Kayser 2006; Kayser 2008	M119(xM110)=11; M110=5
Mulam (Luocheng)	40.5%	42		P203=13; M110=4
Hlai (Jiamao)	40.0%	50	Li et al. 2008	M119=20
Philippines	35.7%	28	Hurles 2005	M119(xM50, M101)=9; M50=1
Dong	35%	20	Xie 2004	M119(xM110, M50, M103)=5; M110/M50/M103=2
Hlai (Zwn)	32.0%	75	Li et al. 2008	M119=24
Sui	31.5%	92		M119(xM110)=29
Malaysian	30.8%	13	Su 1999	M110=3; M119(xM110)=1
Dong	30%	10	Su 1999	M119(xM50, M110, M103)=2; M50/M110/M103=1
Kota Kinabalu	29.2%	65	Hurles 2005	M119(xM50, M101)=12; M50=6; M101=1
Hlai (Moifau)	28.8%	66	Li et al. 2008	M119=19
Trobriand Islands	28.3%	53	Kayser 2006	M119=15
Hlai	27.3%	11		M119(xM110)=3
Trobriand Islands	26.9%	52	Kayser 2008	M110=9; M119(xM110)=5
Li (Hlai)	26.5%	34	Xue 2006	M119
Malay (near Kuala Lumpur)	25.0%	12	Tajima 2004	M119
Han (East China)	24.0%	167	Yan 2011	M119
Han Chinese (Taiwan)	23.1%	26	Kayser 2006	M119=6
Hlai (Ha)	23.0%	74	Li et al. 2008	M119=17
Banjarmasin	22.7%	22	Hurles 2005	M119(xM50, M101)=3; M50=2
Java	22.6%	53	Kayser 2008	M119(xM110)=10; M110=2
Nusa Tenggara	22.6%	31	Kayser 2008	M119(xM110)=4; M110=3
Batak (Sumatra)	22.2%	18	Su 1999	M119(xM50, M110, M103)=4
China	22.2%	36	Kayser 2008	M119(xM110)=8
Balinese	21.1%	641	Karafet 2010	P203=73; M119(xP203, M110)=57; M110=5
Mandar (Sulawesi)	20.4%	54	Karafet 2010	M119(xP203, M110)=7; M110=4
Tujia	20%	-	Su 1999	-
Han (Meixian)	20.0%	35	Xue 2006	M119
Buka	20.0%	10	Scheinfeldt 2006	M119
CDX (Dai in Xishuangbanna)	19.2%	52	Poznik 2016	K644/Z23266=7; F656=2; Z23442=1
Zhuang (Napo County, Guangxi)	19.0%	63		M119=12
Malay	18.5%	27		M50/M110/M103=4; M119(xM50, M110, M103)=1
Thin Board Mien	18.2%	11	Cai 2011	M119(xM110)
Majuro (Marshall Islands)	18.2%	11	Hurles 2005	M50=2
Balinese	18.1%	551	Karafet 2005	M119=100
Sui	18.0%	50	Xie 2004	M119(xM110, M50, M103)=9
Zhuang (Guangxi)	17.9%	28	Su 1999	M119(xM50, M110, M103)=5
Admiralty Islands	17.7%	147	Kayser 2008	M110=26
Malaysia	17.6%	17	Kayser 2008	M119(xM110)=3
Sumatra	17.5%	57	Kayser 2006; Kayser 2008	M119(xM110)=10
Malagasy	17.1%	35	Hurles 2005	M50
Han (South China)	16.9%	65	Yan 2011	M119
Qiang	15.2%	33	Xue 2006	M119
Borneo	15.0%	40	Kayser 2008	M119(xM110)=5; M110=1
Han Chinese	15%	-	Tajima 2004	-
Dai (Dehong, Yunnan)	15.0%	20	Yang 2005	M119=3
Java	14.8%	61	Karafet 2010	P203=6; M119(xP203, M110)=2; M110=1
She	14.7%	34	Xue 2006	M119
Han (Chengdu)	14.7%	34	Xue 2006	M119
Manus	14.3%	7	Scheinfeldt 2006	M119
Palyu	13.3%	30	Cai 2011	M119
Batak Toba	13.2%	38	Karafet 2010	M119(xP203, M110)=4; P203=1
Sumba	12.6%	350	Karafet 2010	M110=22; M119(xP203, M110)=19; P203=3
Micronesia	12.5%	16	Karafet 2010	M119(xP203, M110)=2
Guizhou Miao	12.2%	49	Cai 2011	M119(xM110)
Lowland Kimmun	12.2%	41	Cai 2011	M119(xM110)
Thai (Northern Thailand)	11.8%	17	He 2012	P203(xM101)
Tai Yong (Northern Thailand)	11.5%	26	Brunelli 2017	P203=2; M50=1
Bunu	11.1%	36	Cai 2011	M119(xM110)
Malaysia	11.1%	18	Kayser 2006	M119=2
Filipinos	10.4%	48	Karafet 2010	M110=4; P203=1
Zhuang	10%	-	Hammer 2006	-
Mountain Straggler Mien	10.0%	20	Cai 2011	M119(xM110)
Northeast Thai	10.0%	20	Su 1999	M119(xM50, M110, M103)=1; M50/M110/M103=1
Vietnam	10%	10	Kayser 2006	M119=1
Tai Lue (Northern Thailand)	9.9%	91	Brunelli 2017	P203=6; M50=3
Han (China & Taiwan)	9.7%	165	Karafet 2010	P203=15; M119(xP203, M110)=1
Flores	9.6%	394	Karafet 2010	P203=36; M119(xP203, M110)=2
Zhuang (Guangxi)	9.6%	166	Chen 2006	-
Han (Taiwan)	9.5%	21	Tajima 2004	M119
Han (Yili)	9.4%	32	Xue 2006	M119
Borneo (Indonesia)	9.3%	86	Karafet 2010	M110=5; P203=2; M119(xP203, M110)=1
Bougainville	9.2%	65	Scheinfeldt 2006	M119
Top Board Mien	9.1%	11	Cai 2011	M119(xM110)
Northern Mien	9.1%	33	Cai 2011	M119(xM110)
Northern She	8.9%	56	Cai 2011	M119(xM110)
Thai (Chiang Mai & Khon Kaen)	8.8%	34	Tajima 2004	M119
Hui	8.6%	35	Xue 2006	M119
Mosuo (Ninglang, Yunnan)	8.5%	47	Wen 2004	M119(xM110)
Miao (Wenshan, Yunnan)	8.3%	48	Yang 2005	M119=4
Tonga	8.3%	12	Karafet 2010	M119(xP203, M110)=1
Tujia (Jishou, Hunan)	8.2%	49	Karafet 2010	P203=4
Hlai (Gei)	8.1%	62	Li et al. 2008	M119=5
Hlai/Cun	8%	-	Li et al. 2008	-
Cambodian	7.7%	26	Su 1999	M119(xM50, M110, M103)=1; M50/M110/M103=1
Ewenki (China)	7.7%	26	Xue 2006	M119
Xibe	7.3%	41	Xue 2006	M119
Dai (Shuangjiang, Yunnan)	7.1%	28	Yang 2005	M119=2
Hunan Miao	7.0%	100	Cai 2011	M119(xM110)
Tujia	7%	-	Xie 2004	-
Miao (China)	6.9%	58	Karafet 2010	P203=4
Bai (Dali, Yunnan)	6.7%	30	Yang 2005	M119=2
Katu	6.7%	45	Cai 2011	M119(xM110)
Moluccas	6.7%	30	Karafet 2010	P203=1; M110=1
Han (Lanzhou)	6.7%	30	Xue 2006	M119
Kinh	6.7%	15	Cai 2011	M119(xM110)
Kinh (Hanoi, Vietnam)	6.6%	76	He 2012	P203(xM101)
Southern Mien	6.5%	31	Cai 2011	M119(xM110)
Yao (Malipo, Yunnan)	6.4%	47	Yang 2005	M119=3
Malaysia	6.3%	32	Karafet 2010	M119(xP203, M110)=1; P203=1
Dai (Xinping, Yunnan)	6.1%	49	Yang 2005	M119=3
Lisu (Nujiang, Yunnan)	6.1%	49	Yang 2005	M119=3
Yunnan Miao	6.1%	49	Cai 2011	M119(xM110)
Northern Han	6.1%	49	Tajima 2004	M119
Comorians	6.0%	381	Msaidie 2010	M50=22; MSY2.2(xM50)=1
Bai (Dali, Yunnan)	6.0%	50	Wen 2004	M119(xM110)
Bai (Eryuan, Yunnan)	6.0%	50	Yang 2005	M119=3
Moluccas	5.9%	34	Kayser 2006; Kayser 2008	M119(xM110)=1; M110=1
Kyrgyz (Kyrgyzstan)	5.8%	52	Wells 2001	M119
Vietnam	5.7%	70	Karafet 2010	P203=4
Yao (Liannan, Guangdong)	5.7%	35	Xue 2006	M119
Fiji	5.6%	107	Kayser 2006	M119=6
Mon (Northern Thailand)	5.6%	18	Brunelli 2017	P203=1
Samoa	5.6%	18	Karafet 2010	P203=1
Thailand	5.3%	75	Trejaut 2014	P203=2; M119(xP203, M50)=2
Daur	5.1%	39	Xue 2006	M119
Cham (Binh Thuan, Vietnam)	5.1%	59	He 2012	M119(xM50)
Dungan (Kyrgyzstan)	5.0%	40	Wells 2001	M119
Shan (Northern Thailand)	5.0%	20	Brunelli 2017	P203=1
Manchu (Baoshan, Yunnan)	4.9%	41	Yang 2005	M119=2
Han (NE China)	4.8%	42	Katoh 2005	M119
Maewo (Vanuatu)	4.5%	44	Karafet 2010	M119(xP203, M110)=1; M110=1
Bouyei	4.4%	45	Xie 2004	M119(xM110, M50, M103)=2
Jino (Xishuangbanna, Yunnan)	4.4%	45	Yang 2005	M119=2
Korean	4.4%	45	Wells 2001	M119
KHV (Kinh in Ho Chi Minh City)	4.3%	46	Poznik 2016	Z23392(xZ23442)=1; Z23442=1
Han (Yuxi, Yunnan)	4.3%	47	Yang 2005	M119=2
Western Mien	4.3%	47	Cai 2011	M119(xM110)
Pumi (Ninglang, Yunnan)	4.3%	47	Wen 2004	M119(xM110)
Zhuang (Wenshan, Yunnan)	4.3%	47	Yang 2005	M119=2
Buyi (Luoping, Yunnan)	4.2%	48	Yang 2005	M119=2
Mongolian	4.2%	24	Wells 2001	M119
Tai Khün (Northern Thailand)	4.2%	24	Brunelli 2017	P203=1
Korea	4.0%	25	Kayser 2006	M119=1
Western Samoa	4.0%	25	Hurles 2005	M119(xM101, M50)=1
Khon Mueang (Northern Thailand)	3.9%	205	Brunelli 2017	P203=6; M50=2
Manchu	3.8%	52	Hammer 2006	M119
Koreans (Daejeon)	3.8%	133	Park 2012	P203=3; M119(xP203, M110)=2
New Ireland	3.7%	109	Scheinfeldt 2006	M119
Bo	3.6%	28	Cai 2011	M119(xM110)
Tai Yuan (Thailand)	3.5%	85	Brunelli 2017	P203=3
Japanese	3.4%	263	Nonaka 2007	M119(xM101, M50)
Lembata	3.3%	92	Karafet 2010	M119(xP203, M110)=2; P203=1
Korean	3.2%	216	Kim 2007	M119
Samoa	3.2%	62	Kayser 2006; Kayser 2008	M119(xM110)=2
Han (North China)	3.1%	129	Yan 2011	M119(xM110)
Papua New Guinea (Highlands)	3.0%	33	Karafet 2010	P203=1
Manchu (NE China)	3.0%	101	Katoh 2005	M119
Koreans (Seoul)	3.0%	573	Park 2012	P203=16; M119(xP203, M110)=1
Dai (Xishuangbanna, Yunnan)	2.9%	35	Yang 2005	M119=1
Manchu	2.9%	35	Xue 2006	M119
Han (Harbin)	2.9%	35	Xue 2006	M119
Buyi	2.9%	35	Xue 2006	M119
Yao (Bama, Guangxi)	2.9%	35	Xue 2006	M119
West New Britain	2.8%	249	Scheinfeldt 2006	M119
Koreans	2.7%	300	Park 2012	M119
Koreans	2.7%	75	Hammer 2006	M119
Japanese (Kantō)	2.6%	117	Katoh 2005	M119
Koreans (Seoul)	2.4%	85	Katoh 2005	M119
Lavongai	2.3%	43	Scheinfeldt 2006	M119
Koreans (South Korea)	2.2%	506	Kim 2011	M119
Laven	2.0%	50	Cai 2011	M119(xM110)
Yi (Shuangbai, Yunnan)	2.0%	50	Wen 2004	M119(xM110)
Hmong Daw (Laos)	2.0%	51	Cai 2011	M119(xM110)
She	2.0%	51	Karafet 2010	P203=1
Japanese (Kyushu)	1.9%	104	Tajima 2004	M119
Vanuatu	1.9%	52	Hurles 2005	M50=1
Yao (Guangxi)	1.7%	60	Karafet 2010	P203=1
Uygur	1.4%	70	Xue 2006	M119
East New Britain	1.4%	145	Scheinfeldt 2006	M119
Japanese	1.2%	2390	Sato 2014	M119
Tuvalu	1.0%	100	Kayser 2008	M110=1
Mongolia (mostly Khalkh)	0.7%	149	Hammer 2006	M119
Mongols (Mongolia)	0.6%	160	Di Cristofaro 2013	M119
Lawa (Northern Thailand)	0.0%	50	Brunelli 2017	M119=0
