= Haplogroup O-M122 =

Y-chromosome DNA Haplogroup O2 (formerly O3)

- Possible time of origin: 33,943 (95% CI 25,124–37,631) YBP; 35,000 YBP (with slower average mutation rate) or 30,000 YBP (with faster average mutation rate)
- Coalescence age: 30,365 (95% CI 22,492–33,956) YBP
- Possible place of origin: Southeast Asia or East Asia
- Ancestor: O-M175
- Defining mutations: M122
- Highest frequencies: Nyishi 94%, Adi 89%, Tamang 87%, Kachari (Boro) 85%, Apatani 82%, Rabha 76.5%, Naga 76%, Bhutanese 74%, Naiman Kazakhs 68%, Han Chinese 56%, Toba 55%, Tibetan 48%, She People 48% (78.6% Northern, 62.7%), Manchus 47%, Hmong/Miao 46% (69.0% China, 64.3% Thailand, 44.0% Hunan, 41.2% Laos, 36.7% Yunnan, 30.6% Guizhou, 14.6% Điện Biên Phủ), Vietnamese 44%, Korean 43%, Karen 37%, Filipinos 33%, Southwestern Tai approx. 30.4% (Shan 40%, Siamese 39.5%, Northern Thai 37.2%, Yong 37%, Tai Lue 29%, Saek 29%, Phuan 29%, Thái in Vietnam 29%, Lao 27.5%, Kaleun 24%, Nyaw 22%, Isan 21%, Tai Khün 21%, Phutai 17%, Tai Dam 14%)

Haplogroup O-M122 (also known as Haplogroup O2 (formerly Haplogroup O3)) is an Eastern Eurasian Y-chromosome haplogroup. The lineage ranges across Southeast Asia and East Asia, where it dominates the paternal lineages with extremely high frequencies. Certain subclades also have a significant presence in Central Asia, South Asia (e.g. Nepal, Northeast India), and Oceania.

This lineage is a descendant haplogroup of haplogroup O-M175.

== Origins ==
Researchers believe that O-M122 first appeared in Southeast Asia approximately 25,000-30,000 years ago, or roughly between 30,000 and 35,000 years ago according to more recent studies. In a systematic sampling and genetic screening of an East Asian–specific Y-chromosome haplogroup (O-M122) in 2,332 individuals from diverse East Asian populations, results indicate that the O-M122 lineage is dominant in East Asian populations, with an average frequency of 44.3%. Microsatellite data show that the O-M122 haplotypes are more diverse in Southeast Asia than those in northern East Asia. This suggests a southern origin of the O-M122 mutation to be likely.

It was part of the settlement of East Asia. However, the prehistoric peopling of East Asia by modern humans remains controversial with respect to early population migrations and the place of the O-M122 lineage in these migrations is ambivalent.

== Distribution ==
=== East Asia ===
Haplogroup O-M122 is found in approximately 53.35% of all modern Chinese males (with frequency ranging from 30/101=29.7% among Pinghua-speaking Hans in Guangxi to 110/148=74.3% among Hans in Changting, Fujian), about 40% of Manchu, Chinese Mongolian, Korean, and about 33.3% of Filipino males, Vietnamese males, about 10.5% to 55.6% of Malaysian males, about 10% (4/39 Guide County, Qinghai) to 45% (22/49 Zhongdian County, Yunnan) of Tibetan males, about 20% (10/50 Shuangbai, northern Yunnan) to 44% (8/18 Xishuangbanna, southern Yunnan) of Yi males, about 25% of Zhuang and Indonesian males, and about 16% to 20% of Japanese males. The distribution of Haplogroup O-M122 stretches far into Asia (approx. 40% of Dungans, 30% of Salars, 28% of Bonan, 24% of Dongxiang, 18% to 22.8% of Mongolian citizens in Ulaanbaatar, 11%-15.4% of Khalkha Mongolians, but also as high as 31.1%, 12% of Uyghurs, 9% of Kazakhs, but in the Naiman of Kazakhs 65.81%, 6.8% of Kalmyks (17.1% of Khoshuud, 6.1% of Dörwöd, 3.3% of Torguud, 0% of Buzawa), 6.2% of Altaians, 5.3% of Kyrgyz, about 5.2% of Uzbeks (2.4% of Uzbeks in Afghanistan, 4.1% of Uzbeks in Uzbekistan, 4.3% of Uzbeks in Xinjiang, 5.1% of Uzbeks in Xorazm Region of Uzbekistan, 5.8% of Uzbeks in the Tashkent area of Uzbekistan, 11.9% of Uzbeks in Fergana Region of Uzbekistan, 20% of Uzbeks in Turkistan Region of Kazakhstan) and 4.0% of Buryats.

Modern northern Han Chinese Y haplogroups and mtdna match those of ancient northern Han Chinese ancestors 3,000 years ago from the Hengbei archeological site. 89 ancient samples were taken. Y haplogroups O3a, O3a3, M, O2a, Q1a1, and O* were all found in Hengbei samples. Three men who lived in the Neolithic era are the ancestors of 40% of Han Chinese, with their Y haplogroups being subclades of O3a-M324 and they are estimated to have lived 6,800 years ago, 6,500 years ago and 5,400 years ago.

The East Asian O3-M122 Y chromosome Haplogroup is found in large quantities in other Muslims close to the Hui people like Dongxiang, Bo'an and Salar. The majority of Tibeto-Burmans, Han Chinese, and Ningxia and Liaoning Hui share paternal Y chromosomes of East Asian origin which are unrelated to Middle Easterners and Europeans. In contrast to distant Middle Eastern and Europeans whom the Muslims of China are not related to, East Asians, Han Chinese, and most of the Hui and Dongxiang of Linxia share more genes with each other. This indicates that native East Asian populations converted to Islam and were culturally assimilated to these ethnicities and that Chinese Muslim populations are mostly not descendants of foreigners as claimed by some accounts while only a small minority of them are.

=== South Asia ===
Haplogroup O2-M122 is primarily found among the males of Tibeto-Burmese ancestry in the Himalayas and Northeast India. In Arunachal Pradesh, it is found at 89% among Adi, 82% among Apatani, and 94% among Nishi, while the Naga people show it at 100%. In Meghalaya, 59.2% (42/71) of a sample of Garos and 31.7% (112/353) of a sample of Khasis have been found to belong to O-M122. In Nepal, Tamang people present a very high frequency of O-M122 (39/45 = 86.7%), while much lower percentages of Newar (14/66 = 21.2%) and the general population of Kathmandu (16/77 = 20.8%) belong to this haplogroup. A study published in 2009 found O-M122 in 52.6% (30/57, including 28 members of O-M117 and two members of O-M134(xM117)) of a sample of Tharus from a village in Chitwan District of south-central Nepal, 28.6% (22/77, all O-M117) of a sample of Tharus from another village in Chitwan District, and 18.9% (7/37, all O-M117) of a sample of Tharus from a village in Morang District of southeastern Nepal. In contrast, the same study found O-M122 in only one individual in a sample of non-Tharu Hindus collected in Chitwan District (1/26 = 3.8% O-M134(xM117)), one tribal individual from Andhra Pradesh, India (1/29 = 3.4% O-M117), and one individual in a sample of Hindus from New Delhi, India (1/49 = 2.0% O-M122(xM134)).

=== Southeast Asia ===
Among all the populations of East and Southeast Asia, Haplogroup O-M122 is most closely associated with those that speak a Sinitic, Tibeto-Burman, or Hmong–Mien language. Haplogroup O-M122 comprises about 50% or more of the total Y-chromosome variation among the populations of each of these language families. The Sinitic and Tibeto-Burman language families are generally believed to be derived from a common Sino-Tibetan protolanguage, and most linguists place the homeland of the Sino-Tibetan language family somewhere in northern China. The Hmong–Mien languages and cultures, for various archaeological and ethnohistorical reasons, are also generally believed to have derived from a source somewhere north of their current distribution, perhaps in northern or central China. The Tibetans, however, despite the fact that they speak a language of the Tibeto-Burman language family, have high percentages of the otherwise rare haplogroups D-M15 and D3, which are also found at much lower frequencies among the members of some other ethnic groups in East Asia and Central Asia.

Haplogroup O-M122 has been implicated as a diagnostic genetic marker of the Austronesian expansion when it is found in populations of insular Southeast Asia and Oceania. It appears at moderately high frequencies in the Philippines, Malaysia, and Indonesia. Its distribution in Oceania is mostly limited to the traditionally Austronesian culture zones, chiefly Polynesia (approx. 25% to 32.5%). O-M122 is found at generally lower frequencies in coastal and island Melanesia, Micronesia, and Taiwanese aboriginal tribes (18% to 27.4% of Micronesians), and 5% of Melanesians, albeit with reduced frequencies of most subclades.

Haplogroup O-M122* Y-chromosomes, which are not defined by any identified downstream markers, are actually more common among certain non-Han Chinese populations than among Han Chinese ones, and the presence of these O-M122* Y-chromosomes among various populations of Central Asia, East Asia, and Oceania is more likely to reflect a very ancient shared ancestry of these populations rather than the result of any historical events. It remains to be seen whether Haplogroup O-M122* Y-chromosomes can be parsed into distinct subclades that display significant geographical or ethnic correlations.

=== Subclade Distribution ===
==== Paragroup O-M122* ====
Paragroup O2*-M122(xO2a-P197) Y-DNA is quite rare, having been detected only in 2/165 = 1.2% of a sample of Han Chinese in a pool of samples from mainland China, Taiwan, the Philippines, Vietnam, and Malaysia (n=581), 8/641 = 1.2% of a sample of Balinese in a pool of samples from western Indonesia (n=960), and 7/350 = 2.0% of a sample of males from Sumba in a pool of samples from eastern Indonesia (n=957). In the same study, O2*-M122(xO2a-P197) Y-DNA was not observed in a pool of samples from Oceania (n=182).

In 2005, Chinese researchers published a paper reporting the detection of O2*-M122(xO2a-M324) Y-DNA in 1.6% (8/488) of a pool of seven samples of Han Chinese (3/64 = 4.7% Sichuan, 2/98 = 2.0% Zibo, Shandong, 1/60 = 1.7% Inner Mongolia, 1/81 = 1.2% Yunnan, 1/86 = 1.2% Laizhou, Shandong, 0/39 Guangxi, 0/60 Gansu). O2*-M122(xO2a-M324) Y-DNA also was detected in the following samples of ethnic minorities in China: 5.9% (1/17) Jingpo from Yunnan, 4.3% (2/47) Zhuang from Yunnan, 4.1% (2/49) Lisu from Yunnan, 3.2% (1/31) Wa from Yunnan, 2.6% (1/39) Zhuang from Guangxi, 2.5% (2/80) Bai from Yunnan, 2.4% (1/41) Hani from Yunnan, 2.3% (2/88) Lahu from Yunnan, 2.1% (1/47) Yi from Yunnan, 2.1% (1/48) Miao from Yunnan, 1.5% (2/132) Dai from Yunnan, 1.0% (1/105) Miao from Hunan, and 0.9% (2/225) Yao from Guangxi.

O2*-M122(xO2a-M324) Y-DNA has been found as a singleton (1/156 = 0.6%) in a sample from Tibet. It also has been found as a singleton in a sample of nineteen members of the Chin people in Chin State, Myanmar.

In a paper published in 2011, Korean researchers have reported finding O2*-M122(xO2a-M324) Y-DNA in the following samples: 5.9% (3/51) Beijing Han, 3.1% (2/64) Filipino, 2.1% (1/48) Vietnamese, 1.7% (1/60) Yunnan Han, 0.4% (2/506) Korean, including 1/87 from Jeju and 1/110 from Seoul-Gyeonggi. In another study published in 2012, Korean researchers have found O-M122(xM324) Y-DNA in 0.35% (2/573) of a sample from Seoul; however, no individual belonging to O-M122(xM324) was observed in a sample of 133 individuals from Daejeon.

In 2011, Chinese researchers published a paper reporting their finding of O2*-M122(xO2a-M324) Y-DNA in 3.0% (5/167) of a sample of Han Chinese with origins in East China (defined as consisting of Jiangsu, Zhejiang, Shanghai, and Anhui) and in 1.5% (1/65) of a sample of Han Chinese with origins in Southern China. O2* Y-DNA was not detected in their sample of Han Chinese with origins in Northern China (n=129).

In a paper published in 2012, O2*-M122(xO2a-P200) Y-DNA was found in 12% (3/25) of a sample of Lao males from Luang Prabang, Laos. O2* Y-DNA was not detected in this study's samples of Cham from Binh Thuan, Vietnam (n=59), Kinh from Hanoi, Vietnam (n=76), or Thai from northern Thailand (n=17).

Trejaut et al. (2014) found O2-M122(xO2a-M324) in 6/40 (15.0%) Siraya in Kaohsiung, 1/17 (5.9%) Sulawesi, 1/25 (4.0%) Paiwan, 2/55 (3.6%) Fujian Han, 1/30 (3.3%) Ketagalan, 2/60 (3.3%) Hoklo Taiwanese, 1/34 (2.9%) Taiwan Hakka, 1/38 (2.6%) Siraya in Hwalien, 5/258 (1.9%) miscellaneous Han volunteers in Taiwan, and 1/75 (1.3%) in a sample of the general population of Thailand.

Brunelli et al. (2017) found O2-M122(xO2a-M324) in 5/66 (7.6%) Tai Yuan, 1/91 (1.1%) Tai Lue, and 1/205 (0.5%) Khon Mueang in samples of the people of Northern Thailand.

==== O-M324 ====
===== O-M121 =====
O2a1a1a1a1-M121 is a subclade of O2a1-L127.1, parallel to O2a1b-M164 and O2a1c-JST002611.

In an early survey of Y-DNA variation in present-day human populations of the world, O-M121 was detected only in 5.6% (1/18) of a sample from Cambodia and Laos and in 5.0% (1/20) of a sample from China.

In a large study of 2,332 unrelated male samples collected from 40 populations in East Asia (and especially Southwest China), O-M121/DYS257 Y-DNA was detected only in 7.1% (1/14) of a sample of Cambodians and in 1.0% (1/98) of a sample of Han Chinese from Zibo, Shandong.

In a study published in 2011, O-M121 Y-DNA was found in 1.2% (2/167) of a sample of Han Chinese with origins in East China, defined as consisting of Jiangsu, Anhui, Zhejiang, and Shanghai, and in 0.8% (1/129) of a sample of Han Chinese with origins in Northern China. O-M121 was not detected in this study's sample of Han Chinese with origins in Southern China (n=65).

O-L599 (considered to be phylogenetically equivalent to O-M121) also has been found in one individual in the 1000 Genomes Project sample of Han Chinese from Hunan, China (n=37), one individual in the 1000 Genomes Project sample of Kinh from Ho Chi Minh City, Vietnam, one individual in the Human Genome Diversity Project sample of Tujia, an individual from Singapore, and an individual from the Jakarta metropolitan area. According to Chinese consumer genetics company 23mofang, O-L599 currently accounts for about 0.78% of the male population in China and is concentrated in Fujian, Taiwan, Jiangxi, Anhui, Hubei, Zhejiang and other provinces and cities; it appears to have undergone explosive population growth between about 2600 and 2300 years ago.

===== O-M164 =====
O2a1b-M164 is a subclade of O2a1-L127.1, parallel to O2a1a1a1a1-M121 and O2a1c-JST002611.

In an early survey of Y-DNA variation in present-day human populations of the world, O-M164 was detected only in 5.6% (1/18) of a sample from Cambodia and Laos.

In a large study of 2,332 unrelated male samples collected from 40 populations in East Asia (and especially Southwest China), O2a1b-M164 Y-DNA was detected only in 7.1% (1/14) of a sample of Cambodians.

According to 23魔方, O-M164 is a recent branch (TMRCA 2120 years) downstream of O2a1c-JST002611 rather than parallel to it. Out of fourteen members total, six are from Guangdong, five are from Fujian, one is from Nantong, one is from Wenzhou, and one is from Taiwan.

===== O-JST002611 =====
Haplogroup O2a1c-JST002611 is derived from O2-M122 via O2a-M324/P93/P197/P199/P200 and O2a1-L127.1/L465/L467. O2a1c-JST002611 is the most commonly observed type of O2a1 Y-DNA, and, more generally, represents the majority of extant O2-M122 Y-DNA that does not belong to the expansive subclade O2a2-P201.

Haplogroup O2a1c-JST002611 was first identified in 3.8% (10/263) of a sample of Japanese. It also has been found in 3.5% (2/57) of the JPT (Japanese in Tokyo, Japan) sample of the 1000 Genomes Project, including one member of the rare and deeply divergent paragroup O2a1c1-F18*(xO2a1c1a1-F117, O2a1c1a2-F449). Subsequently, this haplogroup has been found with higher frequency in some samples taken in and around China, including 12/58 = 20.7% Miao (China), 10/70 = 14.3% Vietnam, 18/165 = 10.9% Han (China & Taiwan), 4/49 = 8.2% Tujia (China). O-002611 also has been found in a singleton from the Philippines (1/48 = 2.1%), but it has not been detected in samples from Malaysia (0/32), Taiwanese Aboriginals (0/48), She from China (0/51), Yao from China (0/60), Oceania (0/182), eastern Indonesia (0/957), or western Indonesia (0/960). Haplogroup O2a1c‐JST002611 is prevalent in different ethnic groups in China and Southeast Asia, including Vietnam (14.29%), Sichuan of southwestern China (Han, 14.60%; Tibetan in Xinlong County, 15.22%), Jilin of northeastern China (Korean, 9.36%), Inner Mongolia (Mongolian, 6.58%), and Gansu of northwestern China (Baima, 7.35%; Han, 11.30%). Y-DNA belonging to haplogroup O-JST002611 has been observed in 10.6% (61/573) of a sample collected in Seoul and 8.3% (11/133) of a sample collected in Daejeon, South Korea.

According to 23魔方, haplogroup O-IMS-JST002611 currently accounts for approximately 14.72% of the entire male population of China, and its TMRCA is estimated to be 13,590 years. Yan et al. (2011) have found O-IMS-JST002611 in 16.9% (61/361) of a pool of samples of Han Chinese from East China (n=167), North China (n=129), and South China (n=65). According to Table S4 of He Guanglin et al. 2023, haplogroup O2a1b-IMS-JST002611 has been found in 17.50% (366/2091) of a pool of samples of Han Chinese from various provinces and cities of China. Haplogroup O2a1b-IMS-JST002611 is the second most common Y-DNA haplogroup among Han Chinese (and among Chinese in general) after haplogroup O2a2b1a1-M117.

==== O-P201 ====
O2a2-JST021354/P201 has been divided into primary subclades O2a2a-M188 (TMRCA 18,830 ybp, accounts for approximately 4.74% of all males in present-day China) and O2a2b-P164 (TMRCA 20,410 ybp, accounts for approximately 30.4% of all males in present-day China). Among the various branches of O2a2a-M188, O-M7 (TMRCA 14,510 ybp, accounts for approximately 2.15% of all males in present-day China) is notable for its relatively high frequency over a wide swath of Southeast Asia and southern China, especially among certain populations that currently speak Hmong-Mien, Austroasiatic, or Austronesian languages. Other branches of O2a2a-M188, such as O-CTS201 (TMRCA 16,070 ybp, accounts for approximately 1.76% of all males in present-day China), O-MF39662 i.e. O-F2588(xCTS445), and O-MF109044 i.e. O-M188(xF2588) (TMRCA 9,690 ybp, accounts for approximately 0.4% of all males in present-day China) have been found with generally low frequency in China; however, the O-CTS201 > O-FGC50590 > O-MF114497 subclade is fairly common among males in Korea and Japan. O2a2b-P164 has been divided cleanly into O2a2b1-M134 (TMRCA 17,450 ybp, accounts for approximately 27.58% of all males in present-day China), which has been found with high frequency throughout East Asia and especially among speakers of Sino-Tibetan languages, and O2a2b2-AM01822 (TMRCA 16,000 ybp, accounts for approximately 2.80% of all males in present-day China), which has been found with relatively low frequency but high diversity throughout East Asia and with high frequency in Austronesia.

O2a2-P201(xO2a2a1a2-M7, O2a2b1-M134) Y-DNA has been detected with high frequency in many samples of Austronesian-speaking populations, in particular some samples of Batak Toba from Sumatra (21/38 = 55.3%), Tongans (5/12 = 41.7%), and Filipinos (12/48 = 25.0%). Outside of Austronesia, O2a2-P201(xO2a2a1a2-M7, O2a2b1-M134) Y-DNA has been observed in samples of Tujia (7/49 = 14.3%), Han Chinese (14/165 = 8.5%), Japanese (11/263 = 4.2%), Miao (1/58 = 1.7%), and Vietnam (1/70 = 1.4%).

==== O-M159 ====
O2a2a1a1a-M159 is a subclade of O2a2-P201 and O2a2a1a1-CTS201. In an early survey of Y-DNA variation in present-day human populations of the world, O-M159 was detected only in 5.0% (1/20) of a sample from China.

According to 23mofang, the TMRCA of haplogroup O-M159 is estimated to be 8,740 years. It is currently distributed mainly in southern China, and it is estimated to account for about 0.79% of the total male population of China. It is notable that a majority of members of O-M159 in 23mofang's database (accounting for an estimated 0.64% of all Y-DNA in present-day China) belong to a subclade, O-Z25518, whose TMRCA is estimated to be only 2,730 years and whose distribution is highly concentrated in the Guangdong, Fujian, and Jiangxi provinces of southeastern China.

Unlike its phylogenetic siblings, O-M7 and O-M134, O-M159 is very rare, having been found only in 2.9% (1/35) of a sample of Han males from Meixian, Guangdong in a study of 988 males from East Asia.

In a study published in 2011, O-M159 was detected in 1.5% (1/65) of a sample of Han Chinese with origins in Southern China. O-M159 was not detected in the same study's samples of Han Chinese with origins in East China (n=167) or Northern China (n=129).

Trejaut et al. (2014) found O-M159 in 5.0% (3/60) Minnan in Taiwan, 4.2% (1/24) Hanoi, Vietnam, 3.88% (10/258) miscellaneous Han volunteers in Taiwan, 3.6% (2/55) Han in Fujian, 3.24% (12/370) Plains Aborigines in Taiwan (mostly assimilated to Han Chinese), 1.04% (2/192) Western Indonesia (1/25 Kalimantan, 1/26 Sumatra), and 0.68% (1/146) Philippines (1/55 South Luzon).

Kutanan et al. (2019) found O-M159 in 1.6% (2/129) of their samples of Thai people from Central Thailand.

==== O-M7 ====
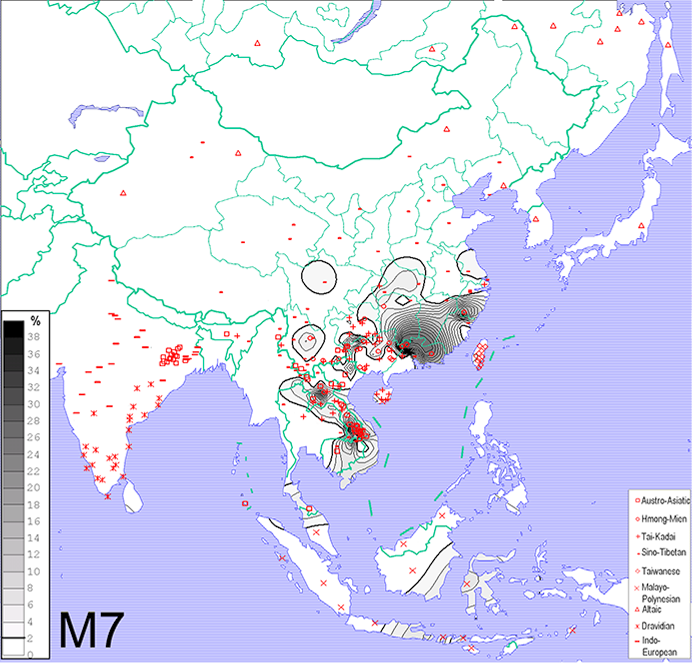
Projected spatial frequency distribution for haplogroup O3-M7.

Haplogroup O2a2a1a2-M7 Y-DNA has been detected with high frequency in some samples of populations who speak Hmong-Mien languages, Katuic languages, or Bahnaric languages, scattered through some mostly mountainous areas of southern China, Laos, and Vietnam.

O-M7 has been noted for having a widespread but uneven distribution among populations that speak Hmong-Mien languages, such as She (29/51 = 56.9% She, 10/34 = 29.4% She, 14/56 = 25.0% Northern She from Zhejiang), Miao (21/58 = 36.2% Miao from China, 17/51 = 33.3% Hmong Daw from northern Laos, 6/49 = 12.2% Yunnan Miao, 2/49 = 4.1% Guizhou Miao, 4/100 = 4.0% Hunan Miao), and Yao (18/35 = 51.4% Yao from Liannan, Guangdong, 29/60 = 48.3% Yao from Guangxi, 12/35 = 34.3% Yao from Bama, Guangxi, 12/37 = 32.4% Zaomin from Guangdong, 5/36 = 13.9% Bunu from Guangxi, 1/11 = 9.1% Top-Board Mien, 3/41 = 7.3% Native Mien, 2/31 = 6.5% Southern Mien from Guangxi, 1/19 = 5.3% Flowery-Headed Mien from Guangxi, 1/20 = 5.0% Mountain Straggler Mien from Hunan, 1/28 = 3.6% Blue Kimmun from Guangxi, 1/31 = 3.2% Pahng from Guangxi, 1/47 = 2.1% Western Mien from Yunnan, 0/11 Thin Board Mien, 0/31 Lowland Yao from Guangxi, 0/32 Mountain Kimmun from Yunnan, 0/33 Northern Mien, and 0/41 Lowland Kimmun from Guangxi).

Cai et al. (2011) have reported finding high frequencies of O-M7 in their samples of Katuic (17/35 = 48.6% Ngeq, 10/45 = 22.2% Katu, 6/37 = 16.2% Kataang, 3/34 = 8.8% Inh (Ir), 4/50 = 8.0% So, 1/39 = 2.6% Suy) and Bahnaric (15/32 = 46.9% Jeh, 17/50 = 34.0% Oy, 8/32 = 25.0% Brau, 8/35 = 22.9% Talieng, 4/30 = 13.3% Alak, 6/50 = 12.0% Laven) peoples from southern Laos. However, O-M7 has been found only with low frequency in samples of linguistically related Khmuic populations from northern Laos (1/50 = 2.0% Mal, 1/51 = 2.0% Khmu, 0/28 Bit, 0/29 Xinhmul), Vietic peoples from Vietnam and central Laos (8/76 = 10.5% Kinh from Hanoi, Vietnam, 4/50 = 8.0% Kinh from northern Vietnam, 2/28 = 7.1% Bo, 4/70 = 5.7% Vietnamese, 0/12 Muong, 0/15 Kinh, 0/38 Aheu), Palaungic peoples from northwestern Laos and southwestern Yunnan (2/35 = 5.7% Lamet, 0/29 Ava, 0/52 Blang), and Pakanic peoples from southeastern Yunnan and northwestern Guangxi (0/30 Palyu, 0/32 Bugan).

Haplogroup O-M7 has been found with notable frequency in some samples of Austronesian populations from the central part of the Malay Archipelago (17/86 = 19.8% Indonesians from Borneo, 4/32 = 12.5% Malaysia, 7/61 = 11.5% Java (mostly sampled in Dieng), 6/56 = 10.7% Sumatra, 4/53 = 7.5% Java, 1/17 = 5.9% Malaysia), but the frequency of this haplogroup appears to drop off very quickly toward the east (1/48 = 2.1% Philippines, 5/641 = 0.8% Balinese, 0/9 Timor, 0/28 Alor, 0/30 Moluccas, 0/31 Nusa Tenggaras, 0/33 Moluccas, 0/37 Philippines, 0/40 Borneo, 0/48 Taiwanese Aboriginals, 0/54 Mandar from Sulawesi, 0/92 Lembata, 0/350 Sumba, 0/394 Flores) and toward the west (0/38 Batak Toba from Sumatra, 0/60 Nias, 0/74 Mentawai). O-M7 has been found in 14.8% (4/27) of a sample of Giarai from southern Vietnam, 8.3% (2/24) of a sample of Ede from southern Vietnam, and 5.1% (3/59) of a sample of Cham from Binh Thuan, Vietnam. These Chamic-speaking peoples inhabit southern Vietnam and eastern Cambodia, but their languages are related to those of the Acehnese and Malays. O-M7 also has been found in 21.1% (8/38) of a small set of samples of highlanders of northern Luzon (including 1/1 Ifugao, 1/2 Ibaloi, 4/12 Kalangoya, and 2/6 Kankanaey).

In the northern fringes of its distribution, O-M7 has been found in samples of Oroqen (2/31 = 6.5%), Tujia from Hunan (3/49 = 6.1%), Qiang (2/33 = 6.1%), Han Chinese (2/32 = 6.3% Han from Yili, Xinjiang, 4/66 = 6.1% Han from Huize, Yunnan, 2/35 = 5.7% Han from Meixian, Guangdong, 1/18 = 5.6% Han from Wuhan, Hubei, 6/148 = 4.1% Han from Changting, Fujian, 20/530 = 3.8% Han Chinese from Chongming Island, 2/63 = 3.2% Han from Weicheng, Sichuan, 18/689 = 2.6% Han Chinese from Pudong, 2/100 = 2.0% Han from Nanjing, Jiangsu, 3/165 = 1.8% Han Chinese, 1/55 = 1.8% Han from Shanghai), Manchus (1/50 = 2.0% Manchu from Liaoning), and Koreans (2/133 = 1.5% Daejeon, 1/300 = 0.3% unrelated Korean males obtained from the National Biobank of Korea, 1/573 = 0.2% Seoul).

According to 23魔方, O-M7 has a TMRCA of approximately 14,530 years and is currently relatively common among many ethnic groups in Sichuan and Yunnan, as well as among the Zhuang, Austroasiatic, and Austronesian groups. O-M7 now accounts for about 2.15% of the total male population in China. The O-N5 subclade (TMRCA 4,230 ybp) by itself accounts for about 0.40% of the total male population in China at present, with its proportion among Hmong-Mien-speaking populations in Southwest China being rather high; in regard to geography, it is found mainly in Guizhou (3.52% of the total provincial population), Hunan (1.63%), Chongqing (1.05%), Sichuan (0.83%), Guangxi (0.76%), Fujian (0.44%), Yunnan (0.35%), Guangdong (0.28%), Jiangxi (0.26%), Hubei (0.26%), Shaanxi (0.20%), and Ningxia (0.18%).

==== O-M134 ====
===== O-M134* =====
O-M134 is the most common branch of O-M122, it is divided into two subclade, M117 and F114. M134 is related to the Yangshao culture and Shimao culture and Sino-tibetan Expansion.

Paragroup O-M134(xM117) has been found with very high frequency in some samples of Kim Mun people, a subgroup of the Yao people of southern China (16/32 = 50.0% Mountain Kimmun from southern Yunnan, 11/28 = 39.3% Blue Kimmun from western Guangxi). However, this paragroup has been detected in only 3/41 = 7.3% of a sample of Lowland Kimmun from eastern Guangxi. This paragroup also has been found with high frequency in some Kazakh samples, especially the Naiman tribe (102/155 = 65.81%). Dulik hypothesizes that O-M134 in Kazakhs was due to a later expansion due to its much more recent TMRCA time.

The general outline of the distribution of O-M134(xM117) among modern populations is different as that of the related clade O-M117. In particular, O-M134(xM117) occurs with only low frequency or is nonexistent among most Tibeto-Burman-speaking populations of Southwest China, Northeast India, and Nepal, who exhibit extremely high frequencies of O-M117. This paragroup also occurs with very low frequency or is non-existent among most Mon-Khmer population of Laos, who exhibit much higher frequencies of O-M117. In Han Chinese, the paragroup is found in approximately the same percentage as O-M117, but has a higher distribution in northern Han Chinese than Southern Han Chinese.

According to 23魔方, the TMRCA of O-M134 is estimated to be 17,450 years, and O-M134(xM117) can be divided into two subsets: O-F122 (TMRCA 17,420 years), which is subsumed alongside O-M117 in an O-F450 clade (TMRCA 17,430 years), and O-MF59333 (TMRCA 13,900 years, currently distributed mainly in southern China and accounting for the Y-DNA of approximately 0.03% of the total male population of China), which is derived from O-M134 but basal to O-F450. O-F122 in turn is divided into O-MF38 (TMRCA 4,680 years, currently distributed mainly in northern China and accounting for the Y-DNA of approximately 0.02% of the total male population of China) and O-F114 (TMRCA 15,320 years, accounts for the Y-DNA of approximately 11.29% of the total male population of China). The O-F46 (TMRCA 10,050 years) subclade of O-F114 by itself accounts for the Y-DNA of approximately 10.07% of the total male population of present-day China.

In a study of Koreans from Seoul (n=573) and Daejeon (n=133), haplogroup O-M134(xM117), all members of which have been found to belong to O-F444 (phylogenetically equivalent to O-F114), has been found in 9.42% of the sample from Seoul and 10.53% of the sample from Daejeon.

In a study of Japanese (n=263), haplogroup O-M134(xM117) has been observed in nine individuals, or 3.4% of the entire sample set. The Japanese members of O-M134(xM117) in this study have originated from Shizuoka (3/12 = 25%), Tokyo (2/52 = 3.8%), Toyama (1/3), Ishikawa (1/4), Tochigi (1/5), and Ibaraki (1/5), respectively.

===== O-M117 =====
Haplogroup O2a2b1a1-M117 (also defined by the phylogenetically equivalent mutation Page23) is a subclade of O2a2b1-M134 that occurs frequently in China and in neighboring countries, especially among Tibeto-Burman-speaking peoples. Haplogroup O2a2b1a1-M117 is the most common Y-DNA haplogroup among present-day Chinese (16.27% China, 59/361 = 16.3% Han Chinese, 397/2091 = 18.99% Han Chinese), followed closely by haplogroup O2a1b-IMS-JST002611.

O-M117 has been detected in samples of Tamang (38/45 = 84.4%)，Tibetans (45/156 = 28.8% or 13/35 = 37.1%), Tharus (57/171 = 33.3%), Han Taiwanese (40/183 = 21.9%), Newars (14/66 = 21.2%), the general population of Kathmandu, Nepal (13/77 = 16.9%), Han Chinese (5/34 = 14.7% Chengdu, 5/35 = 14.3% Harbin, 4/35 = 11.4% Meixian, 3/30 = 10.0% Lanzhou, 2/32 = 6.3% Yili), Tungusic peoples from the PRC (7/45 = 15.6% Hezhe, 4/26 = 15.4% Ewenki, 5/35 = 14.3% Manchu, 2/41 = 4.9% Xibe, 1/31 = 3.2% Oroqen), Koreans (4/25 = 16.0% Koreans from the PRC, 20/133 = 15.0% Koreans from Daejeon, 70/573 = 12.2% Koreans from Seoul, 5/43 = 11.6% Koreans from South Korea, 14/123 = 11.4% Y-DNA from cigarette butts presumed to have been smoked by North Korean males), Mongols (5/45 = 11.1% Inner Mongolian, 3/39 = 7.7% Daur, 3/65 = 4.6% Outer Mongolian), and Uyghurs (2/39 = 5.1% Yili, 1/31 = 3.2% Urumqi).

O-M117 has frequently been found in samples from Thailand, but in widely varying proportions, tending to be more common toward the north and west and less common toward the south and east: 23/57 = 40.4% Karen, 15/38 = 39.5% Shan, 6/21 = 28.6% Nyah Kur, 24/86 = 27.9% Northern Thai, 61/290 = 21.0% Northern Thai, 16/91 = 17.6% Tai Lue, 22/129 = 17.1% Central Thai, 5/30 = 16.7% Tai Lue, 5/33 = 15.2% Lahu, 15/105 = 14.3% Mon, 5/42 = 11.9% Phutai, 7/78 = 9.0% Lao Isan, 1/20 = 5.0% Southern Thai, 0/29 = 0% Khmer.

Like O-M7, O-M117 has been found with greatly varying frequency in many samples of Hmong-Mien-speaking peoples, such as Mienic peoples (7/20 = 35.0% Mountain Straggler Mien, 9/28 = 32.1% Blue Kimmun, 6/19 = 31.6% Flower Head Mien, 3/11 = 27.3% Top Board Mien, 3/11 = 27.3% Thin Board Mien, 11/47 = 23.4% Western Mien, 6/33 = 18.2% Northern Mien, 5/31 = 16.1% Lowland Yao, 5/35 = 14.3% Yao from Liannan, Guangdong, 5/37 = 13.5% Zaomin, 5/41 = 12.2% Lowland Kimmun, 3/41 = 7.3% Native Mien, 2/31 = 6.5% Southern Mien, 2/32 = 6.3% Mountain Kimmun, but 0/35 Yao from Bama, Guangxi), She (6/34 = 17.6% She, 4/56 = 7.1% Northern She), and Hmongic peoples (9/100 = 9.0% Miao from Hunan, 4/51 = 7.8% Hmong Daw from northern Laos, 3/49 = 6.1% Miao from Yunnan, 1/49 = 2.0% Miao from Guizhou, but 0/36 Bunu from Guangxi).

In a study published by Chinese researchers in the year 2006, O-M117 has been found with high frequency (8/47 = 17.0%) in a sample of Japanese that should be from Kagawa Prefecture according to the geographical coordinates (134.0°E, 34.2°N) that have been provided. However, in a study published by Japanese researchers in the year 2007, the same haplogroup has been found with much lower frequency (11/263 = 4.2%) in a larger sample of Japanese from various regions of Japan. More precisely, the Japanese members of O-M117 in this study's sample set have originated from Tokyo (4/52), Chiba (2/44), Gifu (1/2), Yamanashi (1/2), Hiroshima (1/3), Aichi (1/6), and Shizuoka (1/12).

In Meghalaya, a predominantly tribal state of Northeast India, O-M133 has been found in 19.7% (14/71) of a sample of the Tibeto-Burman-speaking Garos, but in only 6.2% (22/353, ranging from 0/32 Bhoi to 6/44 = 13.6% Pnar) of a pool of eight samples of the neighboring Khasian-speaking tribes.

==== O-M333 ====
Population	Frequency	n	Source	SNPs
Derung	1		Shi et al. 2009	
Naga (Sagaing, Myanmar)	1.000	15		Page23=15
Nishi	0.94		Cordaux et al. 2004	
Adi	0.89		Cordaux et al. 2004	
Tamang	0.867	45	Gayden et al. 2007	M134
Nu	0.86		Wen et al. 2004a	
Yao (Liannan)	0.829	35	Xue et al. 2006	M7=18; M117=5; M122(xM159, M7, M134)=4; M134(xM117)=2
Achang	0.825		Shi et al. 2009	
Apatani	0.82		Cordaux et al. 2004	
Bai	0.82		Shi et al. 2009	
CHS (Han in Hunan & Fujian)	0.788	52	Poznik et al. 2016	M122=41
Naga (NE India)	0.765	34	Cordaux et al. 2004	M134=26
Ava (Yunnan)	0.759	29	Cai et al. 2011	M122
Han Chinese	0.74		Wen et al. 2004a	
She	0.735	34	Xue et al. 2006	M7=10; M122(xM159, M7, M134)=7; M117=6; M134(xM117)=2
Nu	0.7		Shi et al. 2009	
Miao	0.7		Karafet et al. 2001	
Shui	0.7		Shi et al. 2009	
Han (Harbin)	0.657	35	Xue et al. 2006	M122(xM159, M7, M134)=10; M134(xM117)=8; M117=5
Lisu	0.65		Wen et al. 2004a	
Zaomin (Guangdong)	0.649	37	Cai et al. 2011	M122
She	0.63		Karafet et al. 2001	
Filipinos	0.62		Jin, Tyler-Smith & Kim 2009	
Taiwan Han	0.619	21	Tajima et al. 2004	M122
Philippines	0.607	28	Hurles et al. 2005	M122
Han (East China)	0.593	167	Yan et al. 2011	M122
Garo	0.59		Reddy et al. 2007	
Kinh (Hanoi, Vietnam)	0.58	48		M122=28
Chin (Chin State, Myanmar)	0.579	19		Page23=10; M122(xM324)=1
Han (North China)	0.566	129	Yan et al. 2011	M122
Toba (Sumatra)	0.553	38	Karafet et al. 2010	P201(xM7, M134)
Northern Han	0.551	49	Tajima et al. 2004	M122
Garo	0.55		Kumar et al. 2007	
Tujia	0.54		Shi et al. 2009	
Tujia	0.53		Karafet et al. 2001	
Han (Chengdu)	0.529	34	Xue et al. 2006	M122(xM159, M7, M134)=8; M134(xM117)=5; M117=5
Han (NE China)	0.524	42	Katoh et al. 2005	M122=22
Han (Meixian)	0.514	35	Xue et al. 2006	M122(xM159, M7, M134)=10; M117=4; M7=2; M159=1; M134(xM117)=1
CHB (Han Chinese in Beijing)	0.500	46	Poznik et al. 2016	F444=8; M117=7; JST002611=5; KL2(xJST002611)=2; M188(xM7)=1
Han (South China)	0.492	65	Yan et al. 2011	M122
Va	0.48		Shi et al. 2009	
Bai	0.48		Shi et al. 2009; Wen et al. 2004a	
KHV (Kinh in Ho Chi Minh City)	0.478	46	Poznik et al. 2016	M7=6; M133=4; F444=4; JST002611=4; KL2(xJST002611)=2; N6>F4124=1; CTS1754=1
Koreans	0.472	216	Kim et al. 2007	
Lisu	0.47		Shi et al. 2009	
Hani	0.47		Wen et al. 2004a	
Han (Yili)	0.469	32	Xue et al. 2006	M122(xM159, M7, M134)=10; M7=2; M117=2; M134(xM117)=1
Bai (Dali, Yunnan)	0.46	50	Wen et al. 2004a	M122
Mongols (Baotou)	0.455	33		F273=2; F4249=2; FGC23868=1; Z26109=1; F133=1; F12=1; Y26383=1; CTS201=1; F8=1; Y20928=1; F748=1; SK1783=1; SK1775=1
Hezhe (China)	0.444	45	Xue et al. 2006	M122(xM159, M7, M134)=11; M134(xM117)=2; M117=7
Koreans	0.443	506	Kim et al. 2011	P201=146; M324(xP201)=76; M122(xM324)=2
Tibetans (Zhongdian, Yunnan)	0.440	50	Wen et al. 2004a	M122
Miao	0.44		Shi et al. 2009	
Yi	0.44		Wen et al. 2004a	
Lahu	0.43		Shi et al. 2009	
Bit (Laos)	0.429	28	Cai et al. 2011	M122
Manchu (NE China)	0.426	101	Katoh et al. 2005	M122=43
Koreans (Seoul)	0.422	573	Park et al. 2012	M122
Koreans (Daejeon)	0.414	133	Park et al. 2012	M122
Hmong Daw (Laos)	0.412	51	Cai et al. 2011	M122
Vietnamese	0.41		Karafet et al. 2001	
Dai	0.4		Yang et al. 2005	
Dungan (Kyrgyzstan)	0.40	40	Wells et al. 2001	M122
Tibetans	0.400	35	Xue et al. 2006	M117=13; M134(xM117)=1
Koreans (China)	0.400	25	Xue et al. 2006	M122(xM159, M7, M134)=6; M117=4
Shan (Northern Thailand)	0.400	20	Brunelli et al. 2017	M117=7; M7=1
Thai (Central Thailand)	0.395	129	Kutanan et al. 2019	F8/F42*=17; M7=11; JST002611=10; F474/F317=4; F323/F46=4; M159=2; F2055/CTS445=1; F2137=1; F837=1
Koreans (South Korea)	0.395	43	Xue et al. 2006	M122(xM159, M7, M134)=7; M134(xM117)=5; M117=5
Vietnamese	0.39		Jin, Tyler-Smith & Kim 2009	
Khon Mueang (Northern Thailand)	0.390	205	Brunelli et al. 2017	O-M117=46; O-M7=17; O-M324(xM7, M134)=16; O-M122(xM324)=1
Mon (Northern Thailand)	0.389	18	Brunelli et al. 2017	M117=4; M324(xM7, M134)=3
Blang (Yunnan)	0.385	52	Cai et al. 2011	M122
Northern Thai people (Khon Mueang & Tai Yuan)	0.384	86	Kutanan et al. 2019	F8/F42=24; M7=7; JST002611=1; F999/F717=1
Manchu	0.38		Karafet et al. 2001	
Philippine (Tagalog language group)	0.380	50	Tajima et al. 2004	M122
Hanoi, Vietnam	0.375	24	Trejaut et al. 2014	M7=3; M134(xM133)=3; M133=1; JST002611=1; M159=1
Manchu	0.371	35	Xue et al. 2006	M122(xM159, M7, M134)=6; M117=5; M134(xM117)=2
Han (Lanzhou)	0.367	30	Xue et al. 2006	M122(xM159, M7, M134)=6; M117=3; M134(xM117)=2
Lahu	0.36		Wen et al. 2004a	
Qiang	0.364	33	Xue et al. 2006	M134(xM117)=4; M117=3; M122(xM159, M7, M134)=3; M7=2
Bamar (Myanmar)	0.361	72		Page23=26
Borneo, Indonesia	0.360	86	Karafet et al. 2010	M122
Korean	0.356	45	Wells et al. 2001	M122
Pahng (Guangxi)	0.355	31	Cai et al. 2011	M122
Philippines	0.354	48	Karafet et al. 2010	M122
Western Yugur	0.35		Zhou et al. 2008	
Thai (Chiang Mai & Khon Kaen)	0.353	34	Shi et al. 2009; Tajima et al. 2004	M122
Tai Yong (Northern Thailand)	0.346	26	Brunelli et al. 2017	M324(xM7, M134)=4; M117=3; M7=2
Tharu	0.345	171	Fornarino et al. 2009	M134
Kinh (Hanoi, Vietnam)	0.342	76	He et al. 2012	M122
Koreans (Seoul)	0.341	85	Katoh et al. 2005	M122=29
Tibet	0.340	156	Gayden et al. 2007	M122
Yao (Bama)	0.343	35	Xue et al. 2006	M7=12
Kazakhs (SE Altai)	0.337	89	Dulik, Osipova & Schurr 2011	M134(xM117, P101)
Tai Yuan (Thailand)	0.329	85	Brunelli et al. 2017	M117=15; M7=5; M122(xM324)=5; M134(xM117)=3
Dai (Xishuangbanna, Yunnan)	0.327	52	Poznik et al. 2016	O-M133=13; O-M7=2; O-F444=1; O-JST002611=1
Polynesians	0.325		Su et al. 2000	
Tibetans	0.32		Wen et al. 2004a	
Khasi	0.32		Reddy et al. 2007	
Lao (Luang Prabang, Laos)	0.32	25	He et al. 2012	M122
Eastern Yugur	0.31		Zhou et al. 2008	
Malays	0.31		Karafet et al. 2001	
Buyei	0.314	35	Xue et al. 2006	M7=6; M134(xM117)=3; M117=1; M122(xM159, M7, M134)=1
Mongolian (Khalkh)	0.311		Kim et al. 2011	
Filipinos	0.308	146	Trejaut et al. 2014	P164(xM134)=26; JST002611=7; M7=3; M133=3; M134(xM133)=2; P201(xM159, M7, P164)=2; M159=1; M324(xKL1, P201)=1
Han (Pinghua speakers)	0.3		Gan et al. 2008	
Salar	0.302	43	Wang et al. 2003	M122
Dong	0.300	20	Xie et al. 2004	M134=3; M122(xM7, M134)=3
Thailand	0.293	75	Trejaut et al. 2014	M133(xM162)=10; M7=5; M134(xM133)=3; JST002611=2; P164(xM134)=1; M122(xM324)=1
Koreans (NE China)	0.291	79	Katoh et al. 2005	M122=23
Khasi	0.29		Kumar et al. 2007	
Zhuang	0.29		Su et al. 2000	
Inner Mongolian	0.289	45	Xue et al. 2006	M122(xM159, M7, M134)=5; M117=5; M134(xM117)=3
Tai Lue (Northern Thailand)	0.286	91	Brunelli et al. 2017	O-M117=16; O-M7=6; O-M324(xM7, M134)=3; O-M122(xM324)=1
Zhuang	0.286	28	Xie et al. 2004	M134=7; M122(xM7, M134)=1
Laotian (Vientiane & Luang Prabang)	0.275	40	Kutanan et al. 2019	F8/F42=6; M7=2; M188(xM7)=2; P164_{(xF8,F46,F4110,F706,F717)}=1
Bonan	0.273	44	Wang et al. 2003	M122
Sibe	0.268	41	Xue et al. 2006	M134(xM117)=5; M122(xM159, M7, M134)=4; M117=2
Micronesia	0.27		Su et al. 2000	
Mon (Thailand)	0.267	105	Kutanan et al. 2019	F8/F42=15; M7=4; F323/F46=4; JST002611=3; F2859=1; M122_{(x002611,M188,P164,F837)}=1
Daur	0.256	39	Xue et al. 2006	M122(xM159, M7, M134)=7; M117=3
Polynesians	0.25		Hammer et al. 2005; Kayser et al. 2006	
Bunu (Guangxi)	0.25	36	Cai et al. 2011	M122
Malay (near Kuala Lumpur)	0.25	12	Tajima et al. 2004	M122
Zhuang (Guangxi)	0.247	166	Jing et al. 2006	M122(xM121, M134)=23; M117=9; M134(xM117)=7; M121=2
Japanese (Kyūshū)	0.240	104	Tajima et al. 2004	M122
Dongxiang	0.24		Wang et al. 2003	
Manchurian Evenks	0.24		Karafet et al. 2001	
Thai (Northern Thailand)	0.235	17	He et al. 2012	M122
Japanese (Kagawa)	0.234	47	Xue et al. 2006	M117=8; M134(xM117)=2; M122(xM159, M7, M134)=1
Mosuo (Ninglang, Yunnan)	0.234	47	Wen et al. 2004a	M122
Evenks (China)	0.231	26	Xue et al. 2006	M117=4; M134(xM117)=1; M122(xM159, M7, M134)=1
Mongolia (mainly Khalkhs)	0.228	149	Hammer et al. 2005	M134=24; M122(xM134)=10
Zhuang (Napo County, Guangxi)	0.222	63		M117=5; M122(xM188, M134)=4; M188=3; M134(xM117)=2
Lawa (Northern Thailand)	0.220	50	Brunelli et al. 2017	M324(xM7, M134)=6; M117=5
Mal (Laos)	0.220	50	Cai et al. 2011	M122
Cambodian (Siem Reap)	0.216	125	Black et al. 2006	M122
Japanese (Tokushima)	0.214	70	Hammer et al. 2005	M134=11; M122(xM134, LINE)=2; LINE=2
Newar	0.212	66	Gayden et al. 2007	M117
Lao Isan	0.210	62	Kutanan et al. 2019	M7=6; F8=4; JST002611=3
Blang	0.21		Shi et al. 2009	
Okinawans	0.21		Nonaka, Minaguchi & Takezaki 2007	
Tai Khün (Northern Thailand)	0.208	24	Brunelli et al. 2017	M117=4; M134(xM117)=1
Kathmandu, Nepal	0.208	77	Gayden et al. 2007	M324
Sui	0.200	50	Xie et al. 2004	M134=10
Yi (Shuangbai, Yunnan)	0.20	50	Wen et al. 2004a	M122(xM7)
Japanese (Shizuoka)	0.197	61	Hammer et al. 2005	M122(xM134, LINE)=7; M134=5
Khmu (Laos)	0.196	51	Cai et al. 2011	M122
Dongxiang	0.196	46	Wang et al. 2003	M122
Oroqen	0.194	31	Xue et al. 2006	M122(xM159, M7, M134)=2; M7=2; M134(xM117)=1; M117=1
Khalkh (Mongolia)	0.188	85	Katoh et al. 2005	M122=16
Japanese (Miyazaki)	0.183	1285	Nohara et al. 2021	M134=118; M122(xM134)=117
Japanese (Tokyo)	0.179	56	Poznik et al. 2016	M117=5; M134(xM117)=3; JST002611=2
Hani	0.176	34	Xue et al. 2006	M134(xM117)=3; M117=2; M122(xM159, M7, M134)=1
Micronesia	0.176	17	Hammer et al. 2005	M122(xM134, LINE)=3
Hui	0.171	35	Xue et al. 2006	M122(xM159, M7, M134)=4; M134(xM117)=1; M117=1
Kalmyk (Khoshuud)	0.171	82	Malyarchuk et al. 2013	M122=14
Japanese	0.167	263	Nonaka, Minaguchi & Takezaki 2007	M122
Mandar (Sulawesi)	0.167	54	Karafet et al. 2010	M122
Mulam (Luocheng)	0.167	42	Wang et al. 2003	JST002611=3; M134(xM117)=3; M117=1
Japanese (Kantō)	0.162	117	Katoh et al. 2005	M122=19
Thai	0.16		Jin, Tyler-Smith & Kim 2009	
Zhuang	0.16		Karafet et al. 2001	
Aheu (Laos)	0.158	38	Cai et al. 2011	M122
Bugan (Yunnan)	0.156	32	Cai et al. 2011	M122
Okinawans	0.156	45	Hammer et al. 2005	M122(xM134, LINE)=3; LINE=3; M134=1
Uygur (Yili)	0.154	39	Xue et al. 2006	M122(xM159, M7, M134)=2; M134(xM117)=2; M117=2
Japanese (Aomori)	0.154	26	Hammer et al. 2005	M134=3; M122(xM134, LINE)=1
Cambodia	0.14		Shi et al. 2009	
Cham (Binh Thuan, Vietnam)	0.136	59	He et al. 2012	M122
Java (mainly sampled in Dieng)	0.131	61	Karafet et al. 2010	M122
Aboriginal Taiwanese	0.126	223	Tajima et al. 2004	M122
Uighur (Kazakhstan)	0.122	41	Wells et al. 2001	M122
Uzbek (Bukhara)	0.121	58	Wells et al. 2001	M122
Ulchi	0.115	52		O-M122(xP201)=6
Karakalpak (Uzbekistan)	0.114	44	Wells et al. 2001	M122
Utsat (Sanya, Hainan)	0.111	72	Li et al. 2013	M117=3; M122(xM159, M117)=3; M159=2
Outer Mongolian	0.108	65	Xue et al. 2006	M122(xM159, M7, M134)=3; M117=3; M134(xM117)=1
Bo (Laos)	0.107	28	Cai et al. 2011	M122
Tibetans	0.1		Zhou et al. 2008	
Maluku Islands	0.1	30	Karafet et al. 2010	M122
Kazakh (Kazakhstan)	0.093	54	Wells et al. 2001	M122
Bouyei	0.089	45	Xie et al. 2004	M122(xM7, M134)=2; M7=1; M134=1
Pumi (Ninglang, Yunnan)	0.085	47	Wen et al. 2004a	M122(xM7)
Zakhchin (Mongolia)	0.083	60	Katoh et al. 2005	M122=5
Mongols	0.083	24	Wells et al. 2001	M122
Balinese (Bali)	0.073	641	Karafet et al. 2010	M122
Japanese	0.068	59	Ochiai et al. 2016	P198
Uriankhai (Mongolia)	0.067	60	Katoh et al. 2005	M122=4
Sinte (Uzbekistan)	0.067	15	Wells et al. 2001	M122
Uygur (Urumqi)	0.065	31	Xue et al. 2006	M134(xM117)=1; M117=1
Iranian (Esfahan)	0.063	16	Wells et al. 2001	M122
Kalmyk (Dörwöd)	0.061	165	Malyarchuk et al. 2013	M122=10
Flores	0.046	394	Karafet et al. 2010	M122
Buryat	0.040	298	Kharkov et al. 2014	M324(xM134)=5; M134(xM117)=4; M117=3
Buyei	0.04		Yang et al. 2005	
Kalmyk (Torguud)	0.033	150	Malyarchuk et al. 2013	M122=5
Kazakhs (SW Altai)	0.033	30	Dulik, Osipova & Schurr 2011	M134(xM117, P101)
Munda (Jharkhand)	0.032	94		M134=3
Burusho	0.031	97	Firasat et al. 2007	M122
Li	0.029	34	Xue et al. 2006	M134(xM117)=1
Sumba	0.029	350	Karafet et al. 2010	M122
Khoton (Mongolia)	0.025	40	Katoh et al. 2005	M122=1
Naxi (Lijiang, Yunnan)	0.025	40	Wen et al. 2004a	M134
Rajbanshi (West Bengal)	0.022	45		M134=1
Pathan	0.010	96	Firasat et al. 2007	M122
Pakistan	0.005	638	Firasat et al. 2007	M122

== Phylogenetics ==
=== Phylogenetic History ===
Prior to 2002, there were in academic literature at least seven naming systems for the Y-Chromosome Phylogenetic tree. This led to considerable confusion. In 2002, the major research groups came together and formed the Y-Chromosome Consortium (YCC). They published a joint paper that created a single new tree that all agreed to use. Later, a group of citizen scientists with an interest in population genetics and genetic genealogy formed a working group to create an amateur tree aiming at being above all timely. The table below brings together all of these works at the point of the landmark 2002 YCC Tree. This allows a researcher reviewing older published literature to quickly move between nomenclatures.

YCC 2002/2008 (Shorthand)	(α)	(β)	(γ)	(δ)	(ε)	(ζ)	(η)	YCC 2002 (Longhand)	YCC 2005 (Longhand)	YCC 2008 (Longhand)	YCC 2010r (Longhand)	ISOGG 2006	ISOGG 2007	ISOGG 2008	ISOGG 2009	ISOGG 2010	ISOGG 2011	ISOGG 2012
O-M175	26	VII	1U	28	Eu16	H9	I	O*	O	O	O	O	O	O	O	O	O	O
O-M119	26	VII	1U	32	Eu16	H9	H	O1*	O1a	O1a	O1a	O1a	O1a	O1a	O1a	O1a	O1a	O1a
O-M101	26	VII	1U	32	Eu16	H9	H	O1a	O1a1	O1a1a	O1a1a	O1a1	O1a1	O1a1a	O1a1a	O1a1a	O1a1a	O1a1a
O-M50	26	VII	1U	32	Eu16	H10	H	O1b	O1a2	O1a2	O1a2	O1a2	O1a2	O1a2	O1a2	O1a2	O1a2	O1a2
O-P31	26	VII	1U	33	Eu16	H5	I	O2*	O2	O2	O2	O2	O2	O2	O2	O2	O2	O2
O-M95	26	VII	1U	34	Eu16	H11	G	O2a*	O2a	O2a	O2a	O2a	O2a	O2a	O2a	O2a	O2a1	O2a1
O-M88	26	VII	1U	34	Eu16	H12	G	O2a1	O2a1	O2a1	O2a1	O2a1	O2a1	O2a1	O2a1	O2a1	O2a1a	O2a1a
O-SRY465	20	VII	1U	35	Eu16	H5	I	O2b*	O2b	O2b	O2b	O2b	O2b	O2b	O2b	O2b	O2b	O2b
O-47z	5	VII	1U	26	Eu16	H5	I	O2b1	O2b1a	O2b1	O2b1	O2b1a	O2b1a	O2b1	O2b1	O2b1	O2b1	O2b1
O-M122	26	VII	1U	29	Eu16	H6	L	O3*	O3	O3	O3	O3	O3	O3	O3	O3	O3	O3
O-M121	26	VII	1U	29	Eu16	H6	L	O3a	O3a	O3a1	O3a1	O3a1	O3a1	O3a1	O3a1	O3a1	O3a1a	O3a1a
O-M164	26	VII	1U	29	Eu16	H6	L	O3b	O3b	O3a2	O3a2	O3a2	O3a2	O3a2	O3a2	O3a2	O3a1b	O3a1b
O-M159	13	VII	1U	31	Eu16	H6	L	O3c	O3c	O3a3a	O3a3a	O3a3	O3a3	O3a3a	O3a3a	O3a3a	O3a3a	O3a3a
O-M7	26	VII	1U	29	Eu16	H7	L	O3d*	O3c	O3a3b	O3a3b	O3a4	O3a4	O3a3b	O3a3b	O3a3b	O3a2b	O3a2b
O-M113	26	VII	1U	29	Eu16	H7	L	O3d1	O3c1	O3a3b1	O3a3b1	-	O3a4a	O3a3b1	O3a3b1	O3a3b1	O3a2b1	O3a2b1
O-M134	26	VII	1U	30	Eu16	H8	L	O3e*	O3d	O3a3c	O3a3c	O3a5	O3a5	O3a3c	O3a3c	O3a3c	O3a2c1	O3a2c1
O-M117	26	VII	1U	30	Eu16	H8	L	O3e1*	O3d1	O3a3c1	O3a3c1	O3a5a	O3a5a	O3a3c1	O3a3c1	O3a3c1	O3a2c1a	O3a2c1a
O-M162	26	VII	1U	30	Eu16	H8	L	O3e1a	O3d1a	O3a3c1a	O3a3c1a	O3a5a1	O3a5a1	O3a3c1a	O3a3c1a	O3a3c1a	O3a2c1a1	O3a2c1a1

==== Original Research Publications ====
The following research teams per their publications were represented in the creation of the YCC Tree.

- α Jobling & Tyler-Smith 2000 and Kaladjieva et al. 2001
- β Underhill et al. 2000
- γ Hammer et al. 2001
- δ Karafet et al. 2001
- ε Semino et al. 2000
- ζ Su et al. 1999
- η Capelli et al. 2001

=== Phylogenetic Trees ===
This phylogenetic tree of haplogroup O subclades is based on the YCC 2008 tree. and subsequent published research.

- O-M122 (M122, P198)
  - O-P93 (M324, P93, P197, P198, P199, P200)
    - O-M121 (M121, P27.2)
    - O-M164 (M164)
    - O-P201 (P201/021354)
    - O-002611 (002611)
    - O-M300 (M300)
    - O-M333 (M333)

== See also ==
=== Genetics ===
- Genetic genealogy
- Haplogroup
- Haplotype
- Human Y-chromosome DNA haplogroup
- Molecular phylogeny
- Paragroup
- Subclade
- Y-chromosome haplogroups in populations of the world
- Y-DNA haplogroups by ethnic group
- Y-DNA haplogroups in populations of East and Southeast Asia

=== Y-DNA O Subclades ===
- O-47z
- O-M101
- O-M113
- O-M117
- O-M119
- O-M121
- O-M122
- O-M134
- O-M159
- O-M162
- O-M164
- O-M175
- O-M176
- O-M50
- O-M7
- O-M88
- O-M95
- O-MSY2.2
- O-P31
