= Cư Jút =

Cư Jút Xã Cư Jút
- Commune
- Cư Jút commune
- Location within Vietnam
- Coordinates: 12°35′12″N 107°53′37″E
- Country: Vietnam
- Region: Central Highlands
- Province: Lâm Đồng
- Time zone: UTC+7 (UTC + 7)

Cư Jút is a commune (xã) of Lâm Đồng Province, Vietnam. It is one of the 124 new wards, communes and special zones of the province following the reorganization in 2025.

Cư Jút Commune was established on June 16, 2025, pursuant to Resolution No. 1656/NQ-UBTVQH15 of the Standing Committee of the National Assembly, on the basis of the merger of the entire natural area and population of Ea T’ling township and the communes of Trúc Sơn, Tâm Thắng, and Cư K’nia (Cư Jút district).

== Etymology ==
Its name Cư M'jut means "the mountain of bamboo" in Rhade language.

The name of its largest settlement, Ea T'ling, means "the river of kunai grasses" in Rhade language.
