= Cư Jút district =

Coordinates: 12.667°N 107.750°E

Cư Jút district Huyện Cư Jút
- Rural District
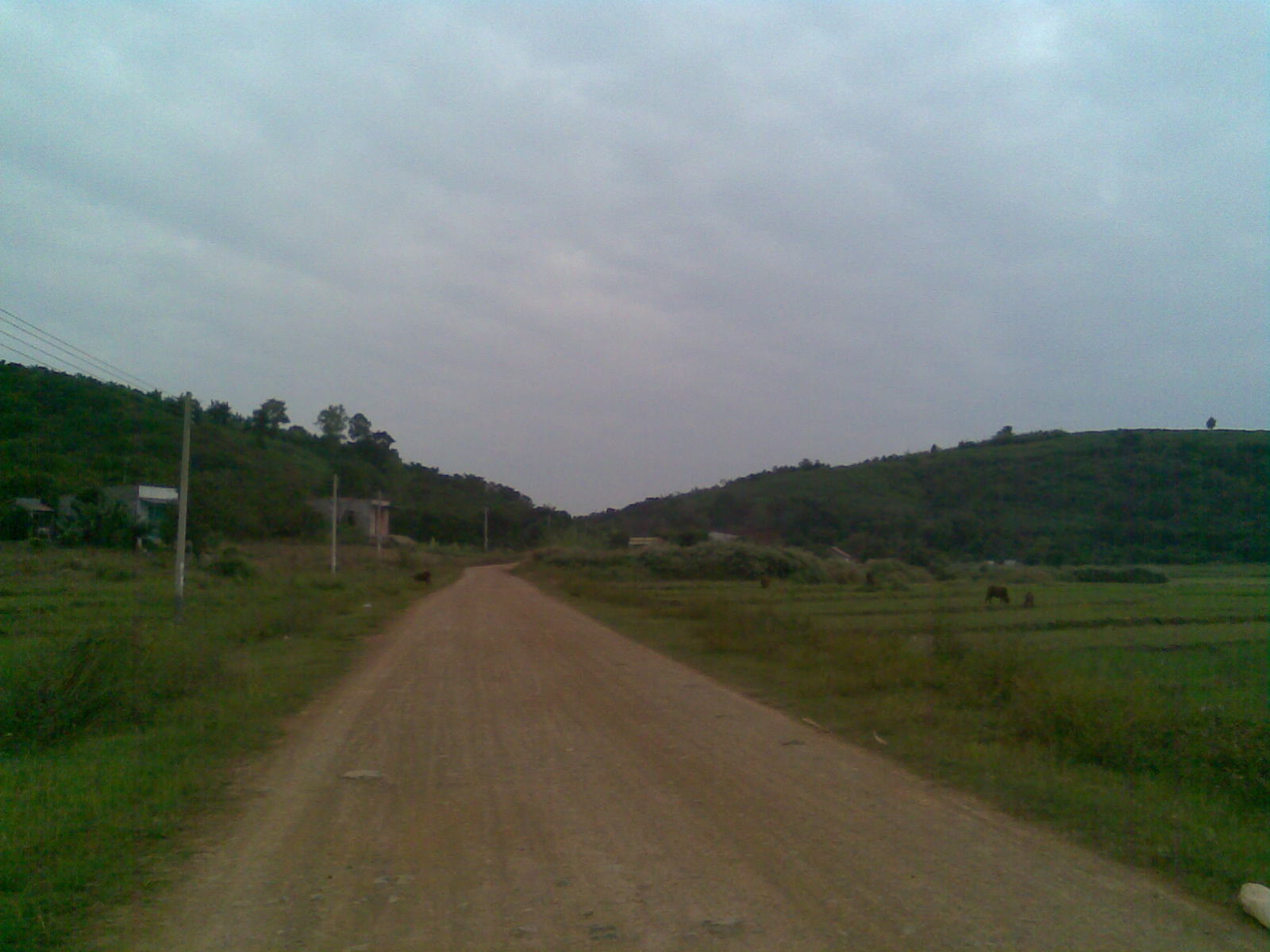
- The path leading to Nam Dong.

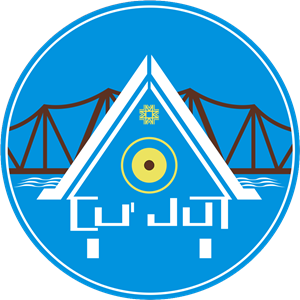
- Seal
- Interactive map of Cư Jút district
- Country: Vietnam
- Region: Central Highlands
- Province: Đắk Nông province
- Capital: Ea T'ling

Area
  - Total: 72,326 km^{2} (27,925 sq mi)

Population (2020)
  - Total: 92.464
- Time zone: UTC+7 (Indochina Time)
- ZIP code: 65400

Cư Jút was a former rural district of Đắk Nông province in the Central Highlands of Vietnam. It is now a commune-level subdivision of Đắk Lắk province.

== Etymology ==
Its name Cư M'jut means "the mountain of bamboo" in Rhade language.

== Demographics and geography ==
As of 2020, the district had a population of 92.464. The district covers an area of 723,26 km². The district capital lies at Ea T'ling.
