= Yong language =

Southwestern Tai language of Thailand

Yong
- Nyong
- Native to: Thailand
- Native speakers: (13,000 cited 2000)
- Language family: Kra–Dai: Tai; Southwestern (Thai); ?; Yong

Language codes
- ISO 639-3: yno
- Glottolog: yong1277
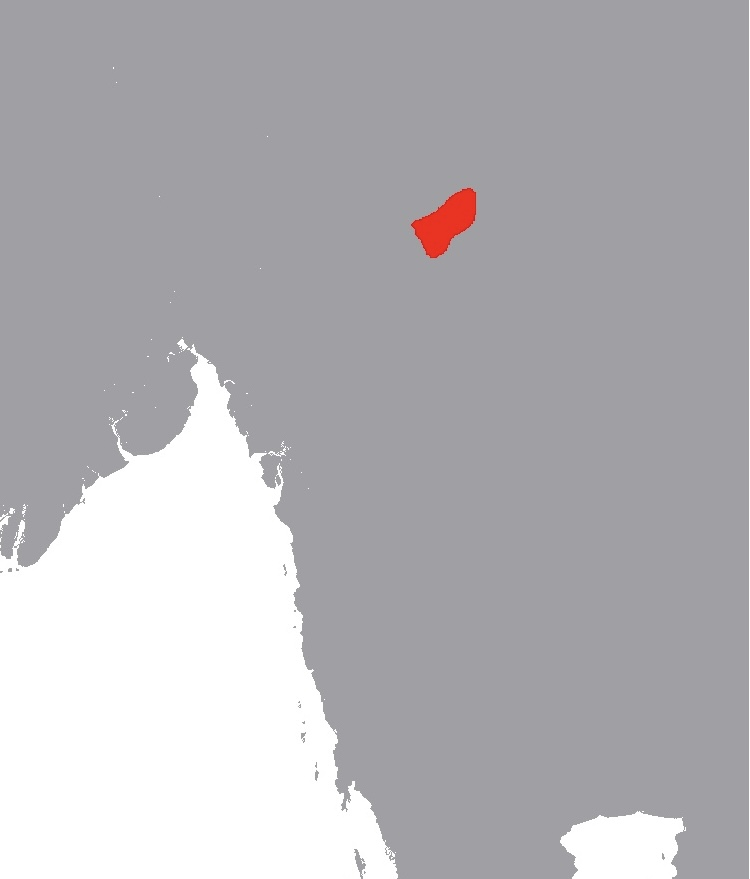

Yong (Nyong) is a Southwestern Tai language of Thailand. It is used by Tai Yong people, who are descended from Tai Lue people from Xishuangbanna, China and Kengtung, Myanmar. Ethnologue reports that Yong is phonologically similar to the Tai Lue language. Most Yong speakers are multilingual and speak Northern Thai and Standard Thai. There were 12,600 speakers as of 2000.

== Distribution ==
Yong is spoken in San Kamphaeng District, Chiang Mai Province, and Pa Sang District, Mae Tha District, and Mueang Lamphun District, Lamphun Province (Ethnologue).

== Phonology ==
Consonants of Yong
	Bilabial	Labio-dental	Alveolar	Palatal	Velar	Labial–velar	Glottal
Plosive	p pʰ b		t tʰ d		k kʰ		ʔ
Nasal	m		n	ɲ	ŋ		
Sibilant fricative			s				
Non-sibilant fricative		f					h
Approximant				j		w	
Lateral approximant			l				

Yong has six tones: mid-rising, mid, low, high, mid-falling and high-falling. As of 2019, there appears to be a generational change occurring where the high tone is merged with the high- and mid-falling tones due to language contact with Northern Thai and Standard Thai.
