= Tai Lue people =

Ethnic group

Tai Lue
ᦺᦑᦟᦹᧉ
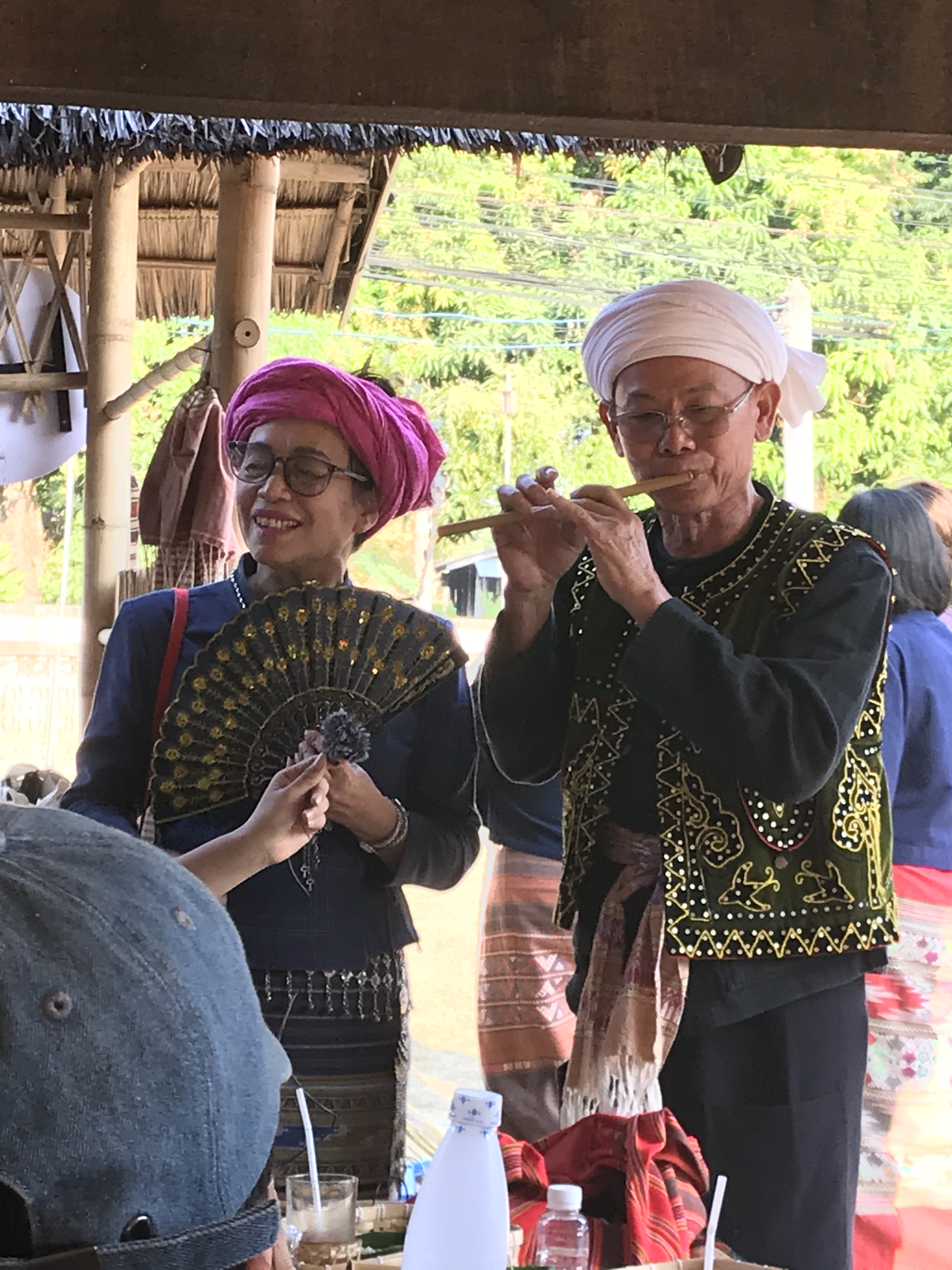
- Tai Lue people in traditional costumes

Total population
- 556,000+

Regions with significant populations
- China (Xishuangbanna), Burma (Myanmar), Laos, Thailand (Northern Thailand) and Vietnam (Lai Châu Province)
- China: 280,000 (2000) classified as Dai
- Laos: 126,229 (2015) classified as Lue
- Thailand: 1,000,000 (2001) classified as Thai Lue
- Burma: 60,000 (2013) classified as Shan
- Vietnam: 6,757 (2019) classified as Lự
- United States: 4,000 (1998)

Languages
- Tai Lü • Chinese • Burmese • Laotian • Thai • Northern Thai • Vietnamese

Religion
- Theravada Buddhism • Tai folk religion

Related ethnic groups
- Tai peoples • Shan people • Tai Nuea

The Tai Lue or Tai Lü (Tai Lue: ᦺᦑᦟᦹᧉ, Chinese: 傣仂, Dǎi lè, Lao: ລື້, Lư̄, Thai: ไทลื้อ, RTGS: Thai Lue, Vietnamese: Người Lự) are an ethnic group of China, Laos, Thailand, Burma and Vietnam. They speak a Southwestern Tai language.

== Etymology ==
The word Lü (ລື້) is similar to the Lao people in the Tai Lü language. Tai Lü can be written as Tai Lue, Dai Le and Dai Lue. They are also known as Xishuangbanna Dai, Sipsongpanna Tailurian and Tai Sipsongpanna. The word Lue (Thai: ลื้อ Tai Lue: ᦟᦹᧉ) in the Tai languages means "north", thus their ethnonym means Northern Tai which they share with Tai Nua people.

== Distribution ==
In Vietnam, most Lu live in Lai Châu Province and their population was 5,601 in 2009. In China, they are officially recognized as part of the Dai ethnic group. The 2000 census counted about 280,000 Dai people speaking Lü language. The population in Thailand, where they are called Thai Lue (Thai: ไทลื้อ), was in 2001 estimated to be approximately 83,000. Most Thai Lue in Thailand live in Nan, Chiang Rai, Phayao and Chiang Mai Province. They sing khap lue (Thai: ไทลื้อขับ, Thai pronunciation: [tʰaj˧ lɯː˦˥ kʰap̚˨˩]) and play pi mae (Thai: ปี่แม่) - free reed wind bamboo instrument.

In Vietnam, Lu are the indigenous people in Mường Thanh ("Land of the God of Tai people", Tai Lü: muong theng). They had built Tam Vạn wall in Mường Thanh and managed there for 19 generations before Hoàng Công Chất, a Thái leader, came. Nowadays, nearly all Vietnamese Lu live in Lai Châu Province. The Lu take their father's last name and have the middle name Bạ (for males) and Ý (for females). Their religion is Theravada Buddhism.

== Gallery ==
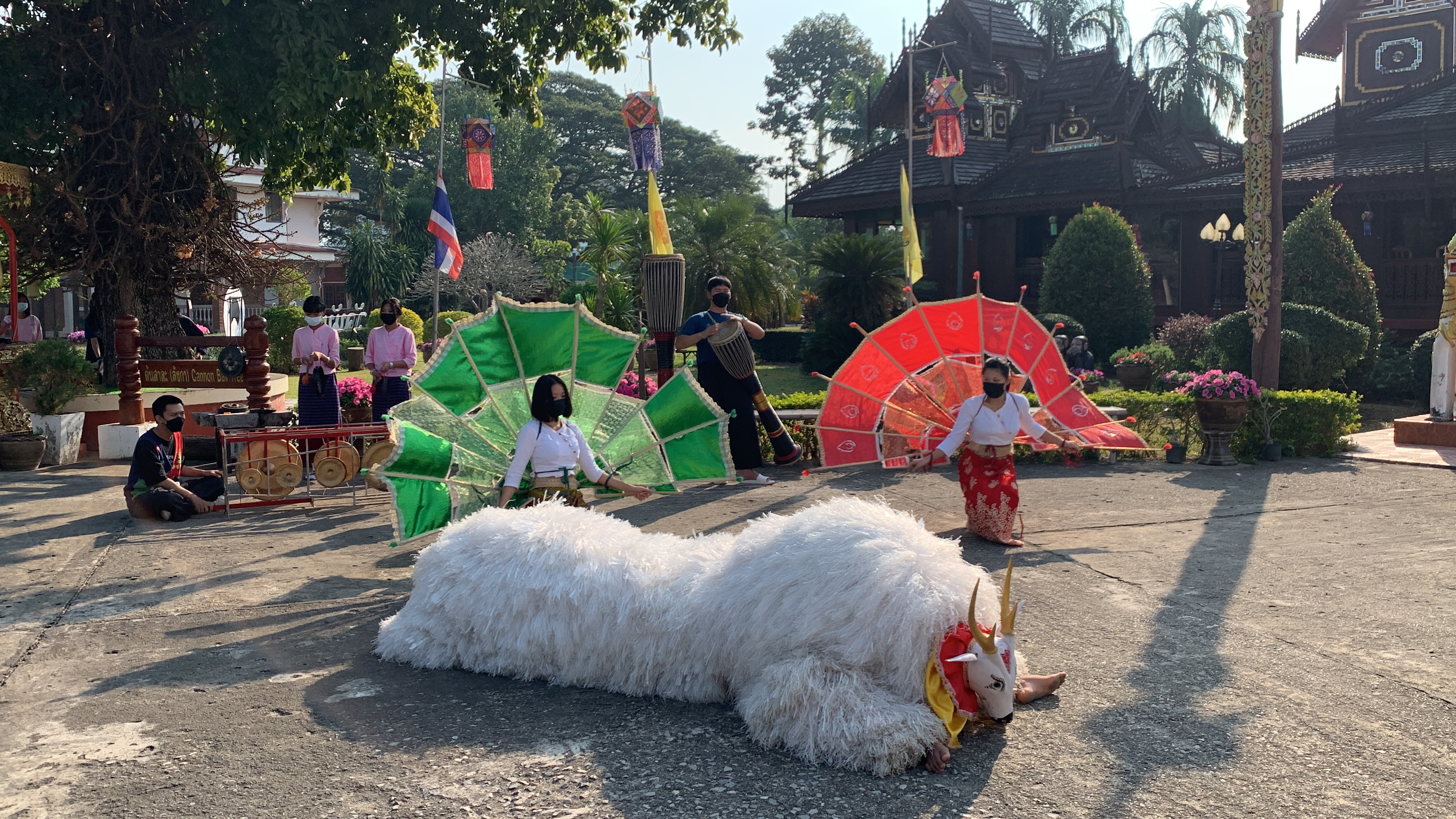
Lu traditional performance at Wat Nantaram, Chiang Kham District, Thailand

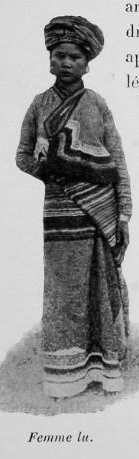
Lu Woman in Laos, c. 1900.

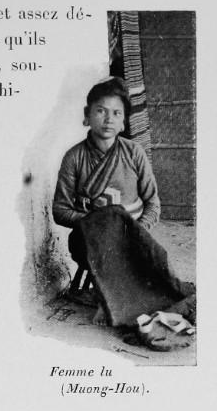
Lu Woman in Laos, c. 1900.

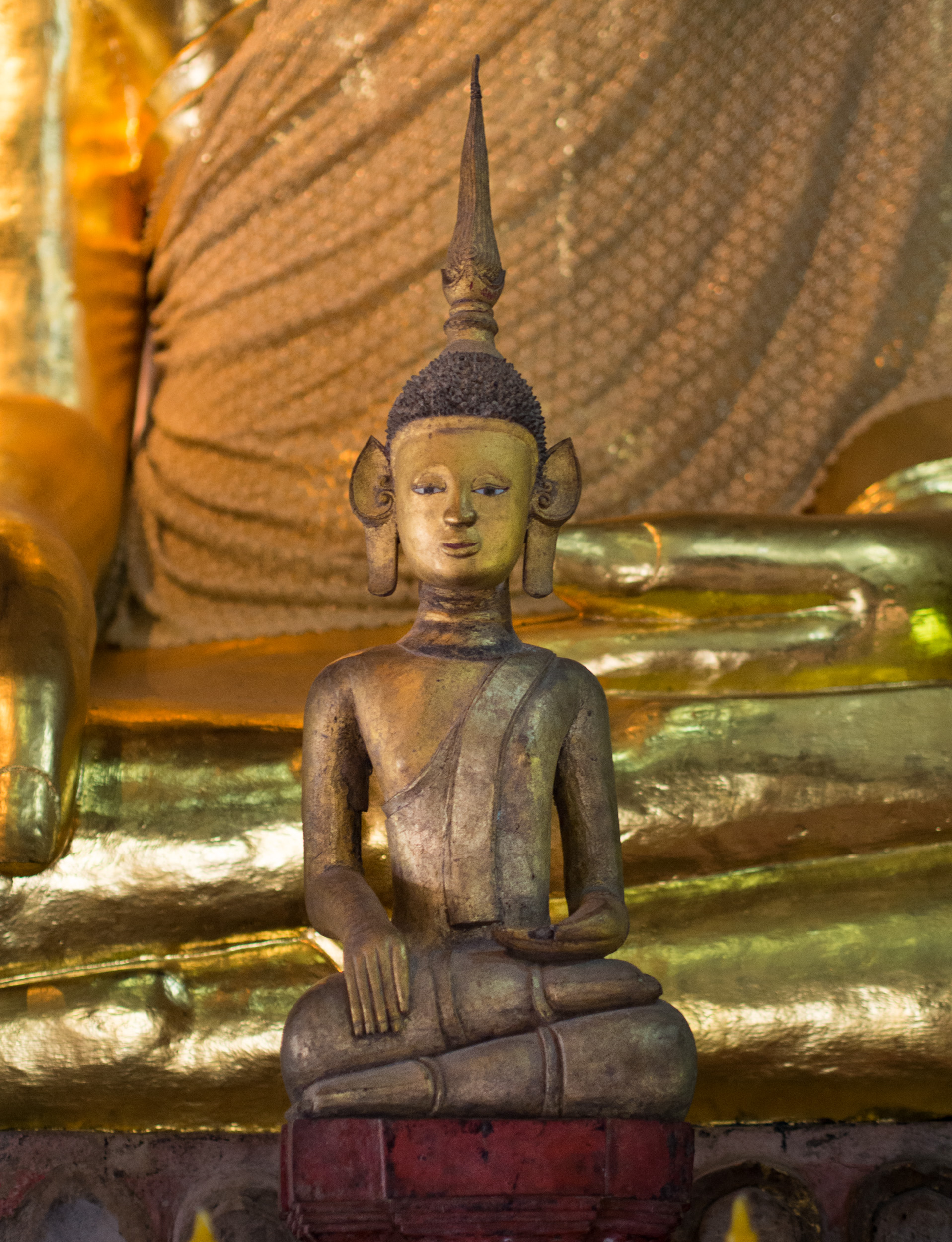
A Tai Lue Buddha statue in Wat Non Bua, Tha Wang Pha District, Thailand

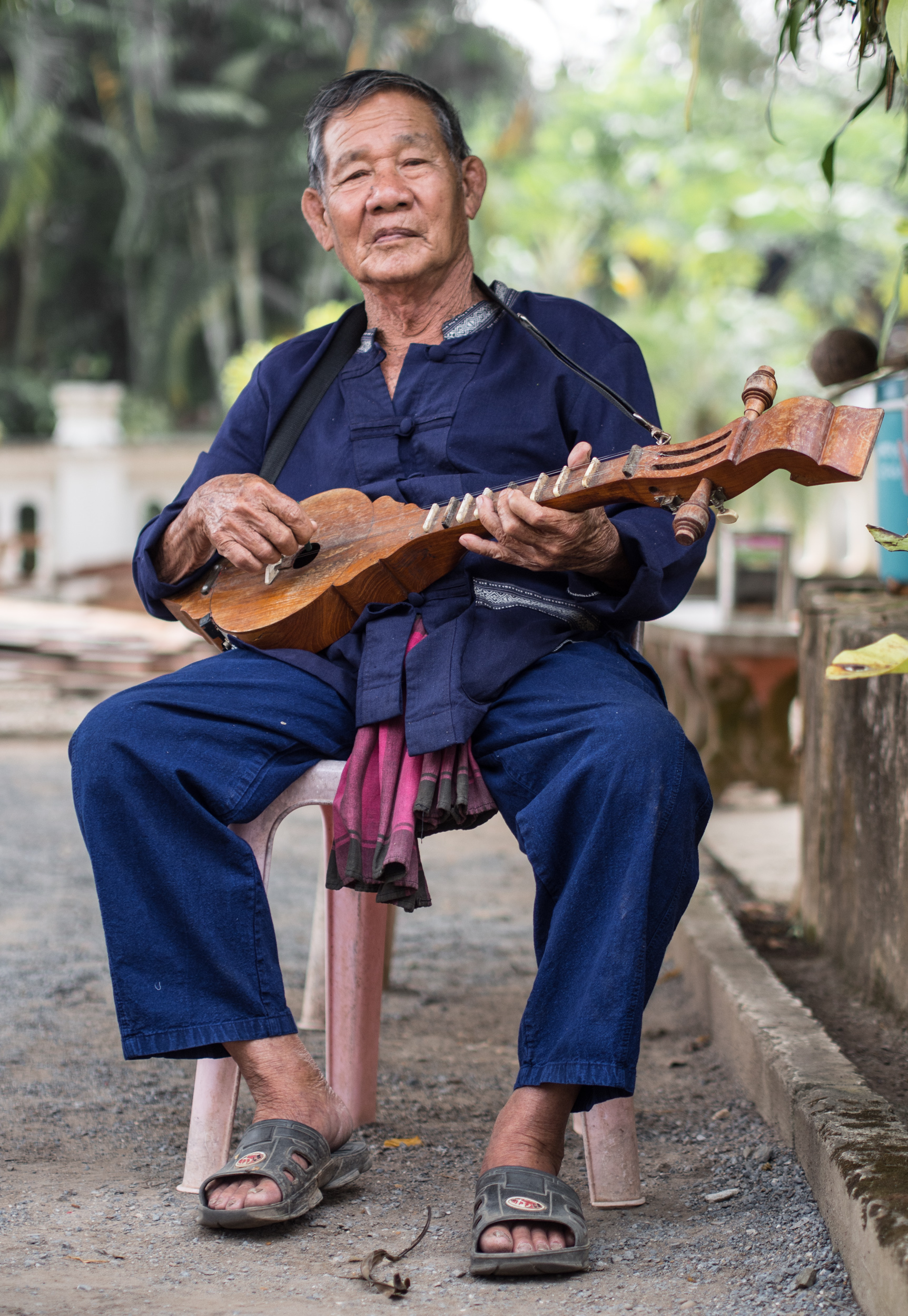
A Tai Lue musician plays in the garden of Wat Nong Bua, Tha Wang Pha District, Thailand.

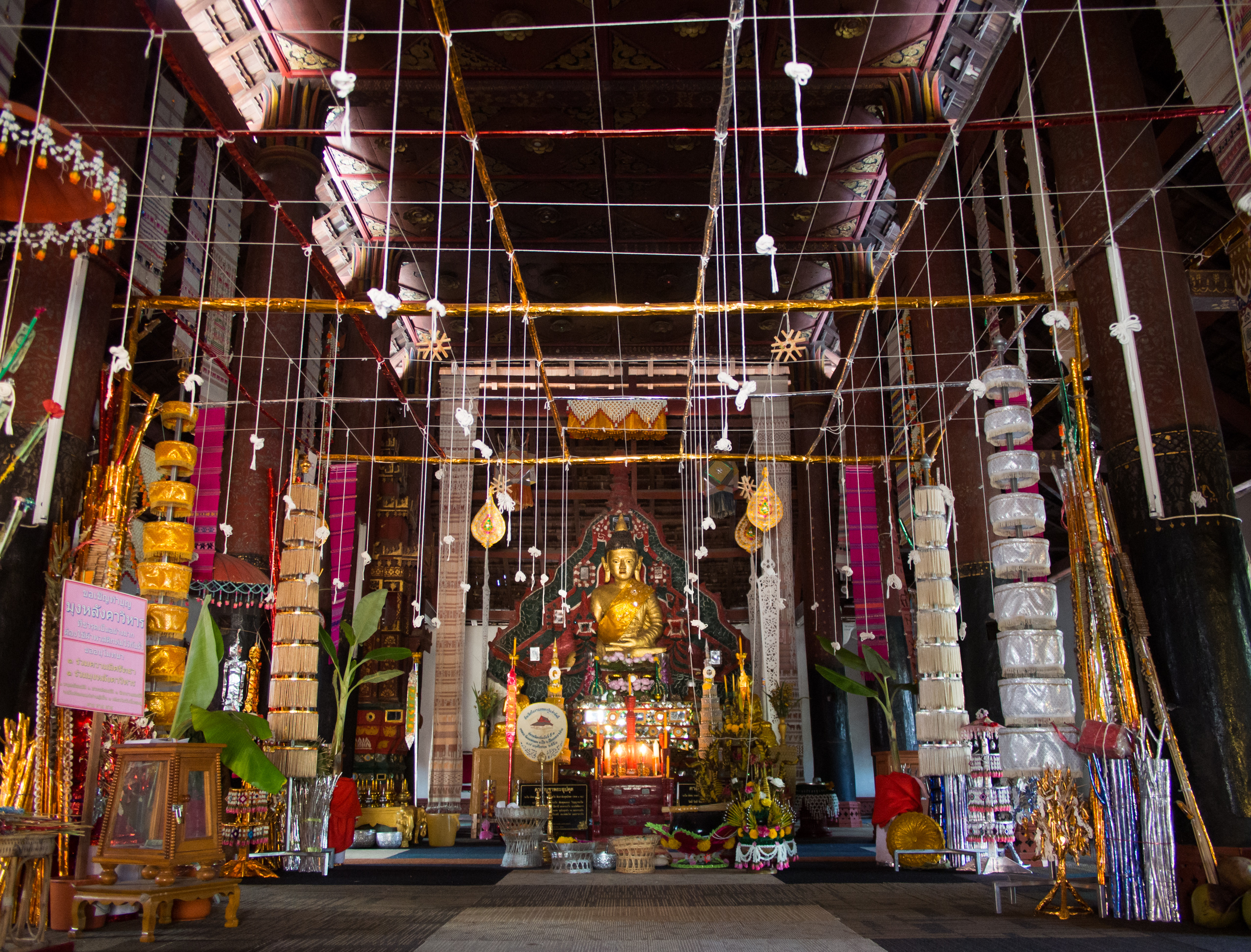
The interior of the wihan of Wat Nong Daeng, Chiang Klang District, Thailand

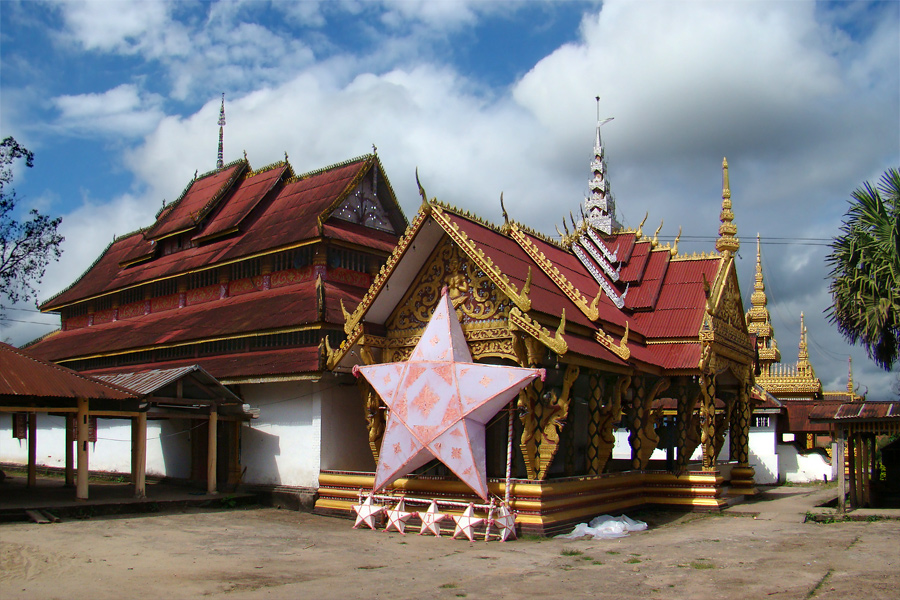
Vat Nam Keo Luang in Muang Sing, Laos

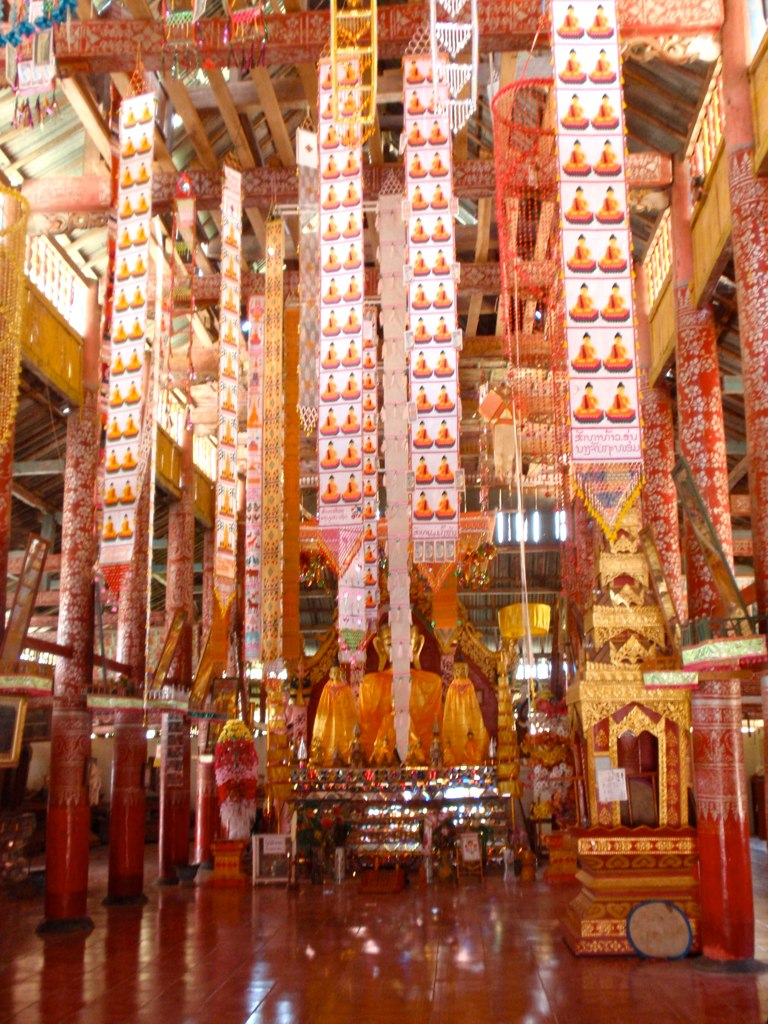
The interior of Vat Xieng Chai, Muang Sing, Laos

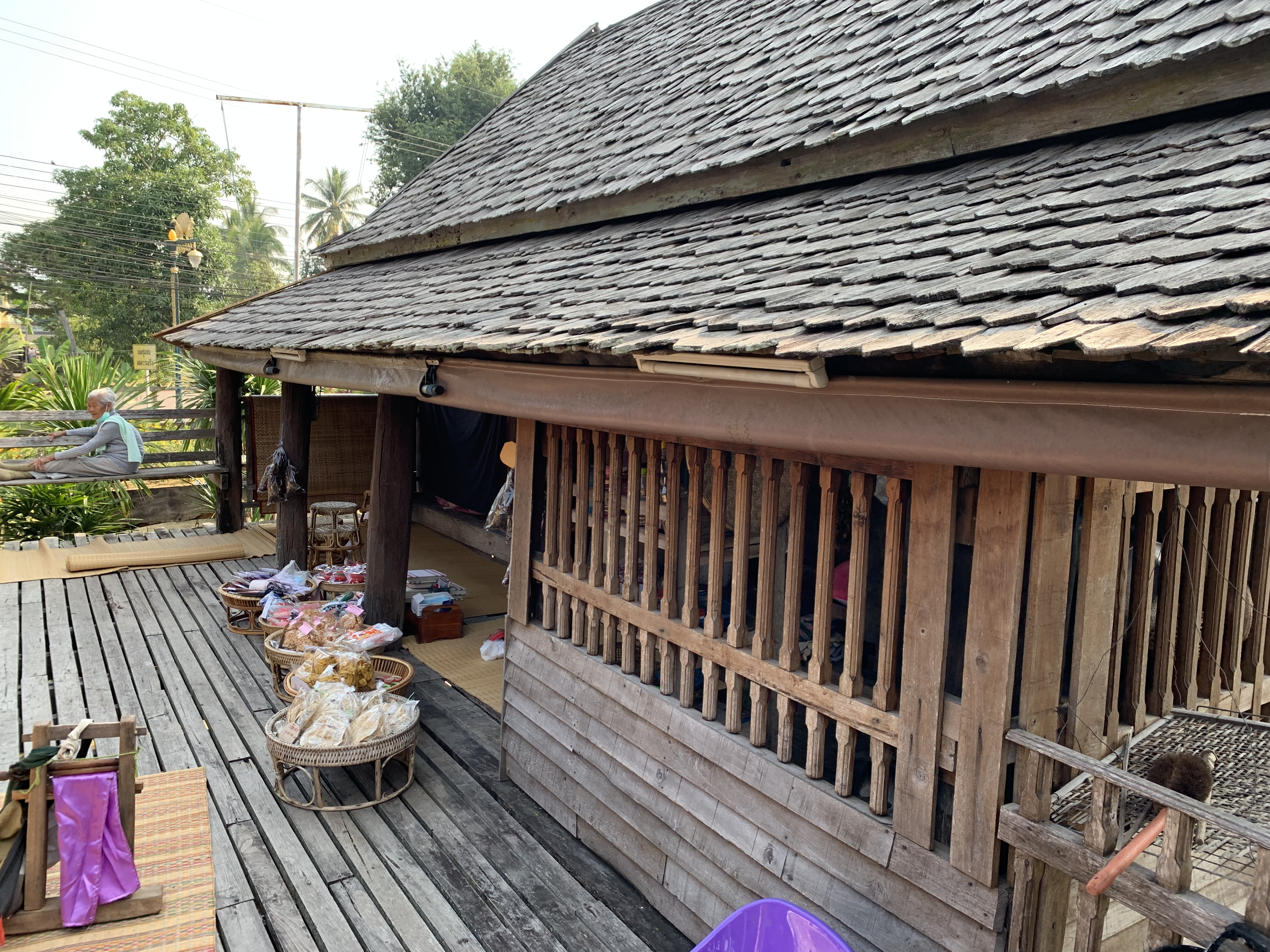
A Tai Lue house in Chiang Kham District, Thailand
